= Jamar Loza =

Jamaican footballer (born 1994)

Personal information
- Full name: Jamar Kasheef Loza
- Date of birth: 10 May 1994 (age 32)
- Place of birth: Kingston, Jamaica
- Height: 5 ft 10 in (1.78 m)
- Position: Forward

Youth career
- 2009–2013: Norwich City

Senior career*
Years	Team	Apps	(Gls)
2013–2016	Norwich City	3	(1)
2013	→ Coventry City (loan)	1	(0)
2014	→ Leyton Orient (loan)	3	(0)
2014	→ Southend United (loan)	7	(1)
2015	→ Yeovil Town (loan)	5	(0)
2015	→ Stevenage (loan)	1	(0)
2016	→ Southend United (loan)	10	(0)
2016–2019	Maidstone United	63	(10)
2018–2019	→ Woking (loan)	9	(7)
2019	Billericay Town	13	(1)
2019–2020	Chelmsford City	9	(0)
2019–2020	→ Woking (loan)	24	(2)
2020	King's Lynn Town	9	(4)
2020–2022	Woking	42	(5)
2022–2023	Barnet	0	(0)
2023	→ Dartford (loan)	2	(0)
2023	→ Cheshunt (loan)	4	(0)
2023–2025	Leiston	72	(35)
2025	Kettering Town	6	(3)

International career
2015	Jamaica U23	1	(1)
2014	Jamaica	4	(0)
- * Club domestic league appearances and goals as of 13:28, 28 March 2025 (UTC)

Jamar Kasheef Loza (born 10 May 1994) is a Jamaican professional footballer who plays as a forward.

He began his career at Norwich City, and made his league debut on loan at Coventry City in November 2013. He also had further loan spells at Leyton Orient and Southend United, before making his Premier League debut for Norwich on the last day of the 2013–14 season. He was loaned out to Yeovil Town in January 2015, Stevenage in October 2015, and Southend United in January 2016, before he was released by Norwich in June 2016. He made four appearances for the Jamaica national team in 2014.

== Club career ==
=== Norwich City and loans ===
Jamar Kasheef Loza was born in Arnett Gardens in Kingston, Jamaica on 10 May 1994, and moved to the United Kingdom as a child. He began his career at Norwich City after coming through the youth team to win a professional contract. On 25 October 2013, he joined League One side Coventry City on a 28-day youth loan; "Sky Blues" manager Steven Pressley said that "Jamar is very quick but he's also very direct and very strong and he's the kind of player that would fit well into our system". He made his debut in the Football League on 2 November, in a 3–0 win over Notts County at Sixfields Stadium, coming on as an 81st-minute substitute for Callum Wilson. The Coventry Telegraph reported that Pressley planned to speak to Norwich manager Chris Hughton about extending the loan deal, though Loza ended up returning to his parent club at the end of the original 28 days. On 6 January 2014, he returned to League One on a 28-day loan at Leyton Orient. He made his debut for the "O's" the following day, and provided an assist for Moses Odubajo to score Orient's first goal in a 2–0 victory win over Shrewsbury Town at the New Meadow. Manager Russell Slade opted to extend the loan into a second month.

On 21 March 2014, Loza joined League Two side Southend United on a one-month loan. He made his debut against Oxford United on 24 March, in which he set up the first goal, won a penalty for the second, and then scored what manager Phil Brown described as a "great goal" to complete a 3–0 victory. He made his first team debut for Norwich as a 58th-minute substitute for Alexander Tettey in a 2–0 defeat to Arsenal at Carrow Road on 11 May; the defeat confirmed Norwich's relegation from the Premier League. In total he played 12 games in the 2013–14 season, appearing seven times for Southend, three times for Leyton Orient, and once each for Coventry and Norwich.

He signed a two-year extension to his contract, with the option of a further year, in June 2014. On 14 January 2015, Loza joined League One side Yeovil Town on a one-month loan. He featured in five games for Gary Johnson's "Glovers". He came off the bench for Norwich in the Championship on 17 March against Huddersfield Town at the Galpharm Stadium, and scored his first goal for the club eight minutes into injury time to secure a 2–2 draw. He played ten games in the 2014–15 season, five each for Norwich and Yeovil.

Loza joined Teddy Sheringham's League Two Stevenage on a one-month emergency loan on 1 October 2015. He returned to Norwich after two games for the "Boro", and scored five goals for the under-21s against Southampton under-21s, but manager Alex Neil admitted that the club's promotion to the Premier League reduced the chances for young players to earn first team opportunities. He returned to Southend United, now in League One, on loan for the rest of the 2015–16 season on 29 January 2016. He was released by Norwich upon the expiry of his contract in June 2016.

=== Non-League ===
Loza had a trial at League One club Port Vale in July 2016, but did not sign for the club. On 20 October 2016, Maidstone United announced they had signed Loza, and on the evening of 25 October 2016 he scored his first goal for the club in a 2–2 draw against Sutton United, in the National League.

On 5 October 2018, Loza joined National League South side Woking on a three-month loan.

On 19 June 2019, after a spell with rivals Billericay Town, Loza signed for Chelmsford City. On 20 September 2019, Loza returned to Woking on loan until January 2020. Once this spell ended, it was then extended until the end of the season. On 13 May 2020, Chelmsford announced the departure of Loza.

On 2 July 2020, Loza signed for King's Lynn Town. However, his time was relatively short-lived at the club as four months later he returned to one of his previous clubs, Woking, for an undisclosed fee on an 18-month contract. On 19 December 2020, Loza made his return to a Woking shirt, during their 2–1 home victory over Dover Athletic in their FA Trophy third round tie, replacing Dave Tarpey in the 56th minute. Two months later, he went onto score his first goal for the club upon his return, netting in the 28th minute during their 2–0 away victory over Barnet. Just a week later, Loza scored the all-important goal to propel the Cards into the semi-finals of the FA Trophy, latching onto team-mate, Charlie Cooper's header before driving a well-worked solo effort past Torquay United goalkeeper, Marcin Brzozowski in the 37th minute. He went onto feature 46 times, scoring six goals before leaving the club at the end of his contract in July 2022. On 1 July 2022, Loza joined Barnet.

On 20 January 2023, Loza joined Dartford on an initial one-month loan. In March 2023 he joined Cheshunt on loan until the end of the season. He was released at the end of the 2022–23 season having only made one appearance for Barnet.

On 23 July 2023, following his release from Barnet, Loza joined Leiston.

On 27 March 2025, Loza joined Kettering Town.

== International career ==
Loza made his debut for Jamaica in a 2–2 draw with Egypt in a friendly at Brisbane Road on 4 June 2014; he entered the game as a substitute, replacing Simon Dawkins in the 84th minute. He was named by head coach Winfried Schäfer in the Jamaica squad for the 2014 Caribbean Cup; Jamaica hosted and won the tournament by beating Trinidad and Tobago on penalties in the final, Loza played in the Group Match against Martinique. He was called up to the under-23 side, and scored on his debut, a 6–1 win over Saint Lucia at the Estadio Olímpico Félix Sánchez on 24 June 2015 in a qualification game for the 2015 CONCACAF Men's Olympic Qualifying Championship. He was named in the provisional squad list for the 2015 CONCACAF Gold Cup, but did not make it onto the final squad.

== Style of play ==
Speaking in June 2014, Norwich City manager Neil Adams described Loza as "a direct player who is lightning quick and can run with the ball, and he causes defenders a lot of problems". In an interview in January 2015, Loza stated that "I like to run in behind. I love scoring goals, but also I let the ball come to feet as well and link up with play".

== Career statistics ==
=== Club ===
As of match played 22 March 2025

Appearances and goals by club, season and competition
Club	Season	League			FA Cup		League Cup		Other		Total	
Club	Season	Division	Apps	Goals	Apps	Goals	Apps	Goals	Apps	Goals	Apps	Goals
Norwich City	2013–14	Premier League	1	0	0	0	0	0	—		1	0
Norwich City	2014–15	Championship	2	1	1	0	2	0	—		5	1
Norwich City	2015–16	Premier League	0	0	0	0	0	0	—		0	0
Norwich City	Total		3	1	1	0	2	0	—		6	1
Coventry City (loan)	2013–14	League One	1	0	0	0	—		—		1	0
Leyton Orient (loan)	2013–14	League One	3	0	—		—		—		3	0
Southend United (loan)	2013–14	League Two	7	1	—		—		—		7	1
Yeovil Town (loan)	2014–15	League One	5	0	—		—		—		5	0
Stevenage (loan)	2015–16	League Two	1	0	0	0	—		1 (Note: Appearance in Football League Trophy)	0	2	0
Southend United (loan)	2015–16	League One	10	0	—		—		—		10	0
Maidstone United	2016–17	National League	24	9	2	0	—		2 (Note: Appearances in FA Trophy)	1	28	10
Maidstone United	2017–18	National League	28	1	4	0	—		4	2	36	3
Maidstone United	2018–19	National League	11	0	—		—		0	0	11	0
Maidstone United	Total		63	10	6	0	—		7	3	75	13
Woking (loan)	2018–19	National League South	9	7	5	0	—		0	0	14	7
Billericay Town	2018–19	National League South	13	1	—		—		—		13	1
Chelmsford City	2010–20	National League South	9	0	—		—		—		9	0
Woking (loan)	2019–20	National League	24	2	2	0	—		1	0	27	2
King's Lynn Town	2020–21	National League	9	4	2	0	—		—		11	4
Woking	2020–21	National League	12	2	—		—		4	1	16	3
Woking	2021–22	National League	30	3	0	0	—		0	0	30	3
Woking	Total		42	5	0	0	—		4	1	46	6
Barnet	2022–23	National League	0	0	0	0	—		1	0	1	0
Dartford (loan)	2022–23	National League South	2	0	—		—		2 (Note: One appearance in the London Senior Cup) (Note: One appearance in the Kent Senior Cup)	0	4	0
Cheshunt (loan)	2022–23	National League South	4	0	—		—		—		4	0
Leiston	2023–24	Southern League Premier Division Central	36	16	1	0	—		1	0	38	16
Leiston	2024–25	Southern League Premier Division Central	36	19	6	5	—		1	0	43	24
Leiston	Total		72	35	7	5	0	0	2	0	81	40
Career total			276	66	23	5	2	0	18	4	319	75

=== International ===
Appearances and goals by national team and year
National team	Year	Apps	Goals
Jamaica	2014	4	0
Total		4	0

== Honours ==
Jamaica

- Caribbean Cup: 2014

== Personal life ==
In October 2025, Loza was jailed for 28 months after being found guilty of the possession of a psychoactive substance with intent to supply.
