= 2017–18 Derby County F.C. season =

Derby County
2017–18 season
- Chairman: Mel Morris
- Manager: Gary Rowett
- Stadium: Pride Park Stadium
- Championship: 6th
- FA Cup: Third round
- EFL Cup: Second round
- Top goalscorer: League: Matej Vydra (21); All: Matej Vydra (22)
- Average home league attendance: 27,175
| Home colours | Away colours | Third colours |

The 2017–18 season was Derby County's tenth consecutive season in the Championship in their 134th year in existence. Along with competing in the Championship, the club also participated in the FA Cup and EFL Cup.

The season covered the period from 1 July 2017 to 30 June 2018.

== Players ==
=== Current squad ===
As of 3 February 2018

Note: Flags indicate national team as defined under FIFA eligibility rules; some limited exceptions apply. Players may hold more than one non-FIFA nationality.

| No. | Pos. | Nation | Player |
|---|---|---|---|
| 1 | GK | ENG | Scott Carson |
| 3 | DF | SCO | Craig Forsyth |
| 6 | DF | IRL | Richard Keogh (Note: Keogh was born in Harlow, England, but also qualifies to represent the Republic of Ireland internationally and represented them at U-19 and U-21 level before making his international debut for the Republic of Ireland in February 2013.) (captain) |
| 7 | MF | ENG | Kasey Palmer (on loan from Chelsea) |
| 8 | MF | SCO | Ikechi Anya |
| 10 | MF | WAL | Tom Lawrence |
| 12 | DF | NIR | Chris Baird |
| 14 | DF | ENG | Andre Wisdom |
| 15 | MF | ENG | Bradley Johnson |
| 16 | DF | IRL | Alex Pearce (Note: Pearce was born in Wallingford, England, but also qualifies to represent Scotland internationally through his parents and the Republic of Ireland through playing for them at schoolboy level and represented Scotland at U-19 and U-21 level before making his international debut for the Republic of Ireland in September 2012.) |
| 17 | FW | ENG | Sam Winnall (on loan from Sheffield Wednesday) |
| 19 | FW | AUT | Andreas Weimann |

| No. | Pos. | Nation | Player |
|---|---|---|---|
| 21 | GK | NED | Kelle Roos |
| 23 | FW | CZE | Matěj Vydra |
| 26 | DF | ENG | Jamie Hanson |
| 28 | FW | ENG | David Nugent |
| 29 | DF | SWE | Marcus Olsson |
| 33 | DF | ENG | Curtis Davies |
| 34 | MF | ENG | George Thorne |
| 35 | GK | ENG | Jonathan Mitchell |
| 36 | MF | WAL | Joe Ledley |
| 44 | MF | ENG | Tom Huddlestone |
| 45 | MF | ENG | Luke Thomas |
| 47 | DF | ENG | Jayden Bogle |

=== Out on loan ===
Note: Flags indicate national team as defined under FIFA eligibility rules; some limited exceptions apply. Players may hold more than one non-FIFA nationality.

| No. | Pos. | Nation | Player |
|---|---|---|---|
| 4 | MF | SCO | Craig Bryson (on loan at Cardiff City) |
| 5 | DF | ENG | Jason Shackell (on loan at Millwall) |
| 9 | FW | SCO | Chris Martin (Note: Martin was born in Beccles, England, and represented them at U-19 level, but also qualifies to represent Scotland internationally through his father and made his international debut for Scotland in May 2014.) (on loan at Reading) |
| 11 | FW | ENG | Darren Bent (on loan at Burton Albion) |
| 18 | MF | ENG | Jacob Butterfield (on loan at Sheffield Wednesday) |
| 20 | FW | ENG | Mason Bennett (on loan at Notts County) |
| 22 | FW | ENG | Nick Blackman (on loan at Maccabi Tel Aviv) |
| 25 | DF | ENG | Max Lowe (on loan at Shrewsbury Town) |

== Transfers ==
=== Transfers in ===
| Date | Nationality | Position | Name | From | Fee | Reference |
|---|---|---|---|---|---|---|
| 7 June 2017 | ENG | CB | Curtis Davies | Hull City | Undisclosed | |
| 3 July 2017 | ENG | RB | Andre Wisdom | Liverpool | Undisclosed | |
| 15 July 2017 | ENG | CM | Tom Huddlestone | Hull City | Undisclosed | |
| 15 August 2017 | WAL | MF | Tom Lawrence | Leicester City | Undisclosed | |
| 20 September 2017 | WAL | MF | Joe Ledley | Unattached | Free Transfer | |
| 16 January 2018 | ENG | FW | Cameron Jerome | Norwich City | Undisclosed | |

=== Transfers out ===
| Date | Nationality | Position | Name | To | Fee | Reference |
|---|---|---|---|---|---|---|
| 23 June 2017 | GUI | FW | Abdoul Camara | Guingamp | Free Transfer | |
| 24 June 2017 | ENG | MF | Will Hughes | Watford | Undisclosed | |
| 1 July 2017 | BRA | MF | Alefe Santos | Free Agency | Released | |
| 1 July 2017 | ENG | FW | Tom Mellors | Free Agency | Released | |
| 1 July 2017 | ENG | MF | Giann Magno | Loyola Ramblers (USA) | Undisclosed | |
| 1 July 2017 | ENG | MF | Micah Edwards | Free Agency | Released | |
| 1 July 2017 | ENG | FW | Jahvan Davidson-Miller | Free Agency | Released | |
| 1 July 2017 | ENG | RB | Harry Goode | Free Agency | Released | |
| 5 July 2017 | ENG | FW | Tom Ince | Huddersfield Town | Undsiclosed | |
| 10 July 2017 | ENG | RB | Cyrus Christie | Middlesbrough | Undisclosed | |
| 31 January 2018 | SCO | FW | Johnny Russell | Sporting Kansas City (USA) | Undisclosed | |

=== Loans In ===
| Date | Nationality | Position | Name | From | Length | Reference |
|---|---|---|---|---|---|---|
| 31 August 2017 | ENG | FW | Sam Winnall | Sheffield Wednesday | Full Season | |
| 31 January 2018 | ENG | MF | Kasey Palmer | Chelsea | Until end of season | |

=== Loans Out ===
| Date | Nationality | Position | Name | To | Length | Reference |
|---|---|---|---|---|---|---|
| 18 August 2017 | ENG | FW | Nick Blackman | Maccabi Tel Aviv | Full Season | |
| 31 August 2017 | ENG | MF | Jacob Butterfield | Sheffield Wednesday | Full Season | |
| 31 August 2017 | SCO | MF | Craig Bryson | Cardiff City | Full Season | |
| 31 August 2017 | ENG | MF | Kellan Gordon | Swindon Town | Full Season | |
| 31 August 2017 | SVN | MF | Timi Elšnik | Swindon Town | Full Season | |
| 5 January 2018 | ENG | LB | Max Lowe | Shrewsbury Town | Until end of season | |
| 25 January 2018 | ENG | CB | Jason Shackell | Millwall | Until end of season | |
| 26 January 2018 | ENG | FW | Darren Bent | Burton Albion | Until end of season | |
| 31 January 2018 | ENG | FW | Mason Bennett | Notts County | Until end of season | |
| 31 January 2018 | SCO | FW | Chris Martin | Reading | Until end of season | |

== Pre-season ==
=== Friendlies ===
On 9 May 2017, Derby County announced they will face two German sides as part of their pre-season preparations. Three days later The Rams confirmed their pre-season schedule ahead of the new campaign.

| 11 July 2017 | Kidderminster Harriers | 0–4 | Derby County | Kidderminster |
| 19:45 BST | | Report | Nugent 8'; Bryson 17'; Martin 31'; Bent 72' | Stadium: Aggborough Stadium; Attendance: 1,078 |

| 15 July 2017 | Macclesfield Town | 0–2 | Derby County | Macclesfield |
| 15:00 BST | | Report | Johnson 71'; Bennett 81' | Stadium: Moss Rose; Attendance: 1,501 |

| 18 July 2017 | Port Vale | 0–1 | Derby County | Burslem |
| 19:45 BST | | Report | Bent 51' (pen.) | Stadium: Vale Park; Attendance: 1,657 |

| 18 July 2017 | Doncaster Rovers | 1–1 | Derby County | Doncaster |
| 19:45 BST | Rowe 59' | Report | Keogh 14' | Stadium: Keepmoat Stadium; Attendance: 2,618 |

| 22 July 2017 | Kaiserslautern | 0–2 | Derby County | Kaiserslautern, Germany |
| 16:00 CEST | | Report | Martin 24'; Johnson 45' | Stadium: Fritz-Walter-Stadion |

| 25 July 2017 | Northampton Town | 1–0 | Derby County | Northampton |
| 19:45 BST | Richards 18' | Report | | Stadium: Sixfields Stadium; Attendance: 2,855 |

| 29 July 2017 | Derby County | 1–2 | 1899 Hoffenheim | Derby |
| 15:00 BST | Vydra 80' | Report | Rupp 60'; Wagner 82' | Stadium: Pride Park Stadium; Attendance: 11,406 |

== Competitions ==
=== Championship ===
Derby County became the first team to score a goal in the Championship 2017–18 season when Bradley Johnson netted after 11 minutes of their opening match against Sunderland.

==== League table ====
| Pos | Team | Pld | W | D | L | GF | GA | GD | Pts | Promotion, qualification or relegation |
|---|---|---|---|---|---|---|---|---|---|---|
| 4 | Aston Villa | 46 | 24 | 11 | 11 | 72 | 42 | +30 | 83 | Qualification for Championship play-offs (Note: Four teams play for one spot and promotion to the Premier League.) |
| 5 | Middlesbrough | 46 | 22 | 10 | 14 | 67 | 45 | +22 | 76 | Qualification for Championship play-offs |
| 6 | Derby County | 46 | 20 | 15 | 11 | 70 | 48 | +22 | 75 | Qualification for Championship play-offs |
| 7 | Preston North End | 46 | 19 | 16 | 11 | 57 | 46 | +11 | 73 | |
| 8 | Millwall | 46 | 19 | 15 | 12 | 56 | 45 | +11 | 72 | |

Source: English Football League
Rules for classification: 1) Points; 2) Goal difference; 3) Number of goals scored

==== Result summary ====
| Overall | | | | | | | | Home | | | | | | Away | | | | | |
| Pld | W | D | L | GF | GA | GD | Pts | W | D | L | GF | GA | GD | W | D | L | GF | GA | GD |
|---|---|---|---|---|---|---|---|---|---|---|---|---|---|---|---|---|---|---|---|
| 46 | 20 | 15 | 11 | 70 | 48 | +22 | 75 | 12 | 5 | 6 | 41 | 22 | +19 | 8 | 10 | 5 | 29 | 26 | +3 |

Last updated: 23 May 2018.

==== Results by matchday ====
| Matchday | 1 | 2 | 3 | 4 | 5 | 6 | 7 | 8 | 9 | 10 | 11 | 12 | 13 | 14 | 15 | 16 | 17 | 18 | 19 | 20 | 21 | 22 | 23 | 24 | 25 | 26 | 27 | 28 | 29 | 30 | 31 | 32 | 33 | 34 | 35 | 36 | 37 | 38 | 39 | 40 | 41 | 42 | 43 | 44 | 45 | 46 |
|---|---|---|---|---|---|---|---|---|---|---|---|---|---|---|---|---|---|---|---|---|---|---|---|---|---|---|---|---|---|---|---|---|---|---|---|---|---|---|---|---|---|---|---|---|---|---|
| Ground | A | H | H | A | A | H | A | H | A | A | H | H | A | A | H | A | H | A | H | H | A | H | H | A | A | H | A | H | A | H | H | A | H | A | H | A | A | H | A | H | H | A | H | H | A | H |
| Result | D | L | W | W | L | W | L | D | D | D | W | W | W | W | L | D | W | W | L | W | W | W | W | D | W | D | W | D | D | W | D | L | D | D | L | D | D | L | W | W | L | L | L | W | D | W |
| Position | 11 | 19 | 14 | 8 | 12 | 7 | 15 | 15 | 15 | 14 | 13 | 8 | 7 | 5 | 6 | 8 | 6 | 6 | 6 | 6 | 4 | 4 | 3 | 4 | 2 | 2 | 2 | 2 | 2 | 2 | 3 | 3 | 4 | 4 | 5 | 5 | 5 | 5 | 5 | 5 | 5 | 7 | 7 | 6 | 6 | 6 |

Updated to match(es) played on 8 April 2018. Source: Statto.com
A = Away; H = Home; W = Win; D = Draw; L = Loss

==== Matches ====
On 21 June 2017, the league fixtures were announced.

| 4 August 2017 1 | Sunderland | 1–1 | Derby County | Sunderland |
| 19:45 BST | Grabban 42' (pen.); Vaughan (yellow card) 89' | Report | Johnson 11' | Stadium: Stadium of Light; Attendance: 29,578; Referee: Oliver Langford |

| 12 August 2017 2 | Derby County | 0–2 | Wolverhampton Wanderers | Derby |
| 15:00 BST | | Report | Douglas 32'; Cavaleiro 76' | Stadium: Pride Park Stadium; Attendance: 27,757; Referee: Lee Probert |

| 15 August 2017 3 | Derby County | 1–0 | Preston North End | Derby |
| 19:45 BST | Johnson (yellow card) 45'; Vydra 58' (pen.); Weimann (yellow card) 90+2' | Report | Robinson (yellow card) 36'; Huntington (yellow card) 57'; Browne (yellow card) 74' | Stadium: Pride Park Stadium; Attendance: 24,371; Referee: Geoff Eltringham |

| 19 August 2017 4 | Bolton Wanderers | 1–2 | Derby County | Horwich |
| 15:00 BST | Karacan (yellow card) 35'; Beevers (yellow card) 57'; Madine 90+1' | Report | Nugent 8', 21'; Wisdom (yellow card) 79' | Stadium: Macron Stadium; Attendance: 15,175; Referee: Steve Martin |

| 26 August 2017 5 | Sheffield United | 3–1 | Derby County | Sheffield |
| 15:00 BST | Sharp 4', 90+7' (yellow card) 89'; O'Connell (yellow card) 32'; Russell 39' (o.g.); Blackman (yellow card) 90+6' | Report | Lawrence (yellow card) 59'; Johnson (yellow card) 71'; Keogh (yellow card) 89'; Bryson 90+1' | Stadium: Bramall Lane; Attendance: 26,202; Referee: Andy Madley |

| 8 September 2017 6 | Derby County | 5–0 | Hull City | Derby |
| 19:45 BST | Vydra 15', 34'; Davies 38'; Johnson 45', 58' | Report | Larsson (penalty missed) 27' | Stadium: Pride Park Stadium; Attendance: 25,107; Referee: Darren Bond |

| 12 September 2017 P | Derby County | P–P | Ipswich Town | Derby |
| 19:45 BST | | | | Stadium: Pride Park Stadium |
Note: Match postponed on 31 August due to second round EFL Cup match against Barnsley being moved to the same date.

| 16 September 2017 7 | Bristol City | 4–1 | Derby County | Ashton Gate |
| 15:00 BST | Woodrow 50'; Reid 55' (pen.); Pack (yellow card) 66'; Paterson 83'; Diedhiou 90+1' | Report | Johnson (yellow card) 4'; Vydra 27' (pen.); Davies (yellow card) 82' | Stadium: Ashton Gate Stadium; Attendance: 19,473; Referee: Martin Atkinsom |

| 23 September 2017 8 | Derby County | 1–1 | Birmingham City | Derby |
| 15:00 BST | Winnall 67' | Report | Jutkiewicz 64' | Stadium: Pride Park Stadium; Attendance: 27,392; Referee: Roger East |

| 26 September 2017 9 | Brentford | 1–1 | Derby County | Brentford |
| 19:45 BST | Woods (yellow card) 30'; Dalsgaard (yellow card) 36'; Watkins (yellow card) 45+5' (goal) 86' | Report | Ledley 15'; Forsyth (yellow card) 25'; Wisdom (yellow card) 30'; Johnson (yellow card) 30'; Winnall (yellow card) 37'; Keogh (yellow card) 76' | Stadium: Griffin Park; Attendance: 8,679; Referee: Andy Davies |

| 30 September 2017 10 | Cardiff City | 0–0 | Derby County | Cardiff |
| 15:00 BST | Damour (yellow card) 66'; Bennett (yellow card) 79' | Report | Johnson (yellow card) 87' | Stadium: Cardiff City Stadium; Attendance: 18,840; Referee: James Linington |

| 15 October 2017 11 | Derby County | 2–0 | Nottingham Forest | Derby |
| 13:15 BST | Vydra 1'; Nugent 50' | Report | Fox (yellow card) 66' | Stadium: Pride Park Stadium; Attendance: 31,196; Referee: Andy Madley |

| 21 October 2017 12 | Derby County | 2–0 | Sheffield Wednesday | Derby |
| 15:00 BST | Vydra 5' (pen.); Nugent (yellow card) 45+1'; Russell (yellow card) 48'; Johnson 86' | Report | Loovens (red card) 4'; Lee (yellow card) 21'; Reach (yellow card) 64' | Stadium: Pride Park Stadium; Attendance: 27,426; Referee: Scott Duncan |

| 28 October 2017 13 | Norwich City | 1–2 | Derby County | Norwich |
| 15:00 BST | Klose (yellow card) 60' (goal) 71' | Report | Nugent 45+1' (yellow card) 74'; Johnson (yellow card) 66'; Forsyth (yellow card) 69'; Winnall 83' | Stadium: Carrow Road; Attendance: 26,048; Referee: Peter Bankes |

| 31 October 2017 14 | Leeds United | 1–2 | Derby County | Leeds |
| 19:45 GMT | Lasogga 7'; Sáiz (yellow card) 82'; Jansson (yellow card) 83' | Report | Keogh (yellow card) 45'; Winnall 72', 80' (pen.); Huddlestone (yellow card) 87' | Stadium: Elland Road; Attendance: 28,565; Referee: Simon Hooper |

| 4 November 2017 15 | Derby County | 2–4 | Reading | Derby |
| 15:00 GMT (UTC) | Winnall (yellow card) 23'; Nugent (yellow card) 60'; Russell 71'; Johnson (yellow card) 81'; Martin (yellow card) 84' (goal) 90+1' | Report | Moore 9'; Aluko 13'; Gunter (yellow card) 32'; Beerens 54'; Barrow (yellow card) 67' (goal) 75'; Mannone (yellow card) 84' | Stadium: Pride Park Stadium; Attendance: 25,938; Referee: Keith Stroud |

| 18 November 2017 16 | Fulham | 1–1 | Derby County | Fulham |
| 15:00 GMT | Norwood 30'; Odoi (yellow card) 53' | Report | Vydra 50' | Stadium: Craven Cottage; Attendance: 18,192; Referee: Darren Bond |

| 21 November 2017 17 | Derby County | 2–0 | Queens Park Rangers | Derby |
| 19:45 GMT | Huddlestone (yellow card) 26'; Forsyth (yellow card) 37'; Vydra 45+3'; Lawrence 53' | Report | Baptiste (yellow card) 23'; Freeman (yellow card) 59'; Bidwell (yellow card) 64' | Stadium: Pride Park Stadium; Attendance: 23,296; Referee: Paul Tierney |

| 25 November 2017 18 | Middlesbrough | 0–3 | Derby County | Middlesbrough |
| 15:00 GMT | Ayala (yellow card) 15' (yellow-red card) 60'; Fábio (yellow card) 53' | Report | Vydra 13', 47' (pen.), 63'; Huddlestone (yellow card) 53'; Ledley (yellow card) 77' | Stadium: Riverside Stadium; Attendance: 24,607; Referee: Simon Hooper |

| 28 November 2017 19 | Derby County | 0–1 | Ipswich Town | Derby |
| 19:45 GMT | Lawrence (yellow card) 33'; Russell (yellow card) 90'; Baird (yellow card) 90+5' | Report | Connolly 5'; Chambers (yellow card) 58'; Webster (yellow card) 64'; Downes (yellow card) 82' | Stadium: Pride Park Stadium; Attendance: 24,475; Referee: Scott Duncan |

| 2 December 2017 20 | Derby County | 1–0 | Burton Albion | Derby |
| 15:00 GMT | Russell 81' | Report | Naylor (yellow card) 14'; Flanagan (yellow card) 65' | Stadium: Pride Park Stadium; Attendance: 26,761; Referee: David Coote |

| 9 December 2017 21 | Barnsley | 0–3 | Derby County | Barnsley |
| 15:00 GMT | | Report | Lawrence 39'; Vydra 44'; Weimann (yellow card) 63' (goal) 78' | Stadium: Oakwell; Attendance: 13,973; Referee: Tim Robinson |

| 16 December 2017 22 | Derby County | 2–0 | Aston Villa | Derby |
| 15:00 GMT | Weimann 24'; Russell 90+1' | Report | | Stadium: Pride Park Stadium; Attendance: 28,118; Referee: Lee Probert |

| 23 December 2017 23 | Derby County | 3–0 | Millwall | Derby |
| 15:00 GMT | Nugent 23', 28'; Vydra 25' | Report | Cooper (yellow card) 54' | Stadium: Pride Park Stadium; Attendance: 25,813; Referee: Darren England |

| 26 December 2017 24 | Hull City | 0–0 | Derby County | Kingston-upon-Hull |
| 15:00 GMT | Hector (yellow card) 28'; Larsson (yellow card) 35' | Report | Johnson (yellow card) 11'; Ledley (yellow card) 72'; Baird (yellow card) 90' | Stadium: KCOM Stadium; Attendance: 18,026; Referee: Tony Harrington |

| 30 December 2017 25 | Ipswich Town | 1–2 | Derby County | Ipswich |
| 15:00 GMT | Garner 66' | Report | Winnall 13', 49' | Stadium: Portman Road; Attendance: 17,267; Referee: Oliver Langford |

| 1 January 2018 26 | Derby County | 1–1 | Sheffield United | Derby |
| 15:00 GMT | Vydra 24' (pen.) | Report | Clarke 57' | Stadium: Pride Park Stadium; Attendance: 30,003; Referee: Darren Bond |

| 13 January 2018 27 | Birmingham City | 0–3 | Derby County | Bordesley |
| 15:00 GMT | | Report | Russell 19'; Vydra 56'; Weimann 89' | Stadium: St Andrew's; Attendance: 22,121; Referee: Lee Probert |

| 19 January 2018 28 | Derby County | 0–0 | Bristol City | Derby |
| 19:45 GMT | Jerome (yellow card) 87' | Report | Bryan (yellow card) 29' | Stadium: Pride Park Stadium; Attendance: 26,525; Referee: Darren England |

| 30 January 2018 29 | Millwall | 0–0 | Derby County | Bermondsey |
| 19:45 GMT | Elliott (yellow card) 71'; McLaughlin (yellow card) 90' | Report | Wisdom (yellow card) 85' | Stadium: The Den; Attendance: 10,931; Referee: Oliver Langford |

| 3 February 2018 30 | Derby County | 3–0 | Brentford | Derby |
| 15:00 GMT | Huddlestone 30'; Jerome 34' (yellow card) 63'; Vydra 90' (pen.); Olsson (yellow card) 90' | Report | Canós (red card) 21'; Woods (yellow card) 37'; Bjelland (yellow card) 71' | Stadium: Pride Park Stadium; Attendance: 25,938; Referee: Peter Bankes |

| 10 February 2018 31 | Derby County | 1–1 | Norwich City | Derby |
| 15:00 GMT | Vydra 12'; Carson (yellow card) 39'; Weimann (yellow card) 90' | Report | Tettey (yellow card) 30'; Reed (yellow card) 53'; Maddison 72' (pen.); Srbeny (yellow card) 90+1' | Stadium: Pride Park Stadium; Attendance: 27,171; Referee: Jeremy Simpson |

| 13 February 2018 32 | Sheffield Wednesday | 2–0 | Derby County | Owlerton, Sheffield |
| 19:45 GMT | João 18', 47'; Hunt (yellow card) 25'; Loovens (yellow card) 81'; Pudil (yellow card) 90' | Report | Ledley (yellow card) 58'; Vydra (yellow card) 68'; Forsyth (yellow card) 90+4' | Stadium: Hillsborough Stadium; Attendance: 24,180; Referee: David Coote |

| 21 February 2018 33 | Derby County | 2–2 | Leeds United | Derby |
| 19:45 GMT | Weimann 45+2'; Palmer 90+2' | Report | Lasogga 34'; Vieira (yellow card) 39'; Alioski 79' | Stadium: Pride Park Stadium; Attendance: 27,934; Referee: Keith Stroud |

| 24 February 2018 34 | Reading | 3–3 | Derby County | Reading |
| 15:00 GMT (UTC) | Kelly 16'; Barrow 32'; Richards (yellow card) 49'; Böðvarsson 80'; Moore (yellow card) 83' | Report | Palmer 6' (yellow card) 50'; Olsson (yellow card) 20'; Keogh 35' (yellow card) 83'; Lawrence 46'; Weimann (yellow card) 83'; Baird (red card) 85'; Carson (yellow card) 86' | Stadium: Madejski Stadium; Attendance: 17,647; Referee: Tony Harrington |

| 3 March 2018 35 | Derby County | 1–2 | Fulham | Derby |
| 15:00 GMT | Lawrence (yellow card) 36'; Palmer (yellow card) 60'; Huddlestone 68'; Weimann (yellow card) 70' | Report | Mitrovic 10', (yellow card) 74'; R Sessegnon 22'; Johansen (yellow card) 60' | Stadium: Pride Park Stadium; Attendance: 27,138; Referee: Lee Mason |

| 6 March 2018 36 | Queens Park Rangers | 1–1 | Derby County | Shepherd's Bush, London |
| 19:45 GMT | Luongo 87'; Scowen (yellow card) 90+3' | Report | Forsyth (yellow card) 16'; Weimann 38', (yellow card) 82'; Lawrence (yellow card) 87' | Stadium: Loftus Road; Attendance: 11,488; Referee: Simon Hooper |

| 11 March 2018 37 | Nottingham Forest | 0–0 | Derby County | Nottingham |
| 14:30 GMT | Colback (yellow card) 33'; Watson (yellow card) 75'; Figueiredo (yellow card) 80'; Darikwa (yellow card) 90+3' | Report | Lawrence (yellow card) 28'; Huddlestone (yellow card) 78' (yellow-red card) 81' | Stadium: City Ground; Attendance: 29,106; Referee: Jeremy Simpson |

| 18 March 2018 P | Derby County | P–P | Cardiff City | Derby |
| 12:00 GMT | | | | Stadium: Pride Park Stadium |
Note: Match postponed due to a frozen pitch and heavy snow.

| 30 March 2018 38 | Derby County | 1–4 | Sunderland | Derby |
| 12:00 BST | Vydra 42', (yellow card) 84'; Johnson (yellow card) 90' | Report | Honeyman 10'; Fletcher 36'; McGeady 50' (pen.); Koné (yellow card) 59'; Love (yellow card) 63'; Cattermole (yellow card) 67'; O'Shea (yellow card) 72', (goal) 76' | Stadium: Pride Park Stadium; Attendance: 27,890; Referee: James Linington |

| 2 April 2018 39 | Preston North End | 0–1 | Derby County | Preston |
| 19:45 BST | Pearson (yellow card) 43'; Fisher (yellow card) 88' | Report | Lawrence 52'; Nugent (yellow card) 68' | Stadium: Deepdale; Attendance: 13,520; Referee: Tony Harrington |

| 7 April 2018 40 | Derby County | 3–0 | Bolton Wanderers | Derby |
| 15:00 BST | Pearce 6'; Vydra 33'; Lawrence 54'; Baird (yellow card) 80' | Report | le Fondre (yellow card) 78' | Stadium: Pride Park; Attendance: 25,723; Referee: Darren England |

| 11 April 2018 41 | Wolverhampton Wanderers | 2–0 | Derby County | Wolverhampton |
| 19:45 BST | Jota 6'; Neves 51'; Bennett (yellow card) 61' | Report | | Stadium: Molineux; Attendance: 28,503; Referee: Tim Robinson |

| 14 April 2018 42 | Burton Albion | 3–1 | Derby County | Burton upon Trent |
| 15:00 BST | Boyce 24'; Buxton (yellow card) 39'; Murphy 44'; Brayford (yellow card) 63'; Akins 68'; Akpan (yellow card) 77' | Report | Nugent 29'; Huddlestone (yellow card) 49' | Stadium: Pirelli Stadium; Attendance: 5,563; Referee: James Linington |

| 21 April 2018 43 | Derby County | 1–2 | Middlesbrough | Derby |
| 15:00 BST | Huddlestone (yellow card) 36'; Hanson (yellow card) 84'; Nugent 90+2' (pen.) | Report | Clayton (yellow card) 1'; Bešić 20'; Traoré (yellow card) 32'; Assombalonga 70' | Stadium: Pride Park; Attendance: 28,096; Referee: Lee Probert |

| 24 April 2018 44 | Derby County | 3–1 | Cardiff City | Derby |
| 19:45 BST | Jerome 69', 90'; Vydra 82' | Report | Paterson (yellow card) 11', (goal) 28'; Manga (yellow card) 53'; Bennett (yellow card) 66'; Ralls (yellow card) 70' | Stadium: Pride Park Stadium; Attendance: 30,294; Referee: Andrew Madley (Huddersfield) |
Note: Live on Sky TV

| 28 April 2018 45 | Aston Villa | 1–1 | Derby County | Birmingham |
| 15:00 BST | Chester 84' | Report | Jerome 14', (yellow card) 87' | Stadium: Villa Park; Attendance: 41,745; Referee: Scott Duncan |

| 6 May 2018 46 | Derby County | 4–1 | Barnsley | Derby |
| 12:30 BST | Jerome 14', Vydra 55', Nugent 68', Lawrence 71' | Report | Moncur 80' | Stadium: Pride Park Stadium; Attendance: 30,682; Referee: Simon Hooper |

==== Football League play-offs ====
| 11 May 2018 Semi final (1st leg) | Derby County | 1–0 | Fulham | Derby |
| 19:45 BST | Jerome 34'; Weimann (yellow card) 78'; Johnson (yellow card) 86' | Report | Johansen (yellow card) 85' | Stadium: Pride Park Stadium; Attendance: 27,163; Referee: Roger East |

| 14 May 2018 Semi final (2nd leg) | Fulham | 2–0 (2–1 agg.) | Derby County | Fulham |
| 19:45 BST | R Sessegnon 47'; Johansen (yellow card) 62'; Odoi 66'; Kamara (yellow card) 74'; McDonald (yellow card) 78'; Bettinelli (yellow card) 90' | Report | Huddlestone (yellow card) 77'; Palmer (yellow card) 78' | Stadium: Craven Cottage; Attendance: 23,529; Referee: Christopher Kavanagh |

=== FA Cup ===
In the FA Cup, Derby County entered the competition in the third round and were drawn away to Manchester United.

| 5 January 2018 Third round | Manchester United | 2–0 | Derby County | Manchester |
| 20:00 GMT | Lingard 84'; Lukaku 90' | Report | | Stadium: Old Trafford; Attendance: 73,899; Referee: Kevin Friend |

=== EFL Cup ===
On 16 June 2017, the first round draw took place with a trip to Grimsby Town announced. Following the abandonment off the first round tie, the fixture was rescheduled for 22 August 2017. Victory against Grimsby Town in the rescheduled match set up a second round tie against Barnsley.

| 8 August 2017 First round | Grimsby Town | A–A | Derby County | Cleethorpes |
| 19:45 BST | | | | Stadium: Blundell Park |

| 22 August 2017 First round | Grimsby Town | 0–1 | Derby County | Cleethorpes |
| 19:45 BST | Berrett (yellow card) 28'; Davies (yellow card) 55' (yellow-red card) 63' | Report | Lawrence (yellow card) 38'; Pearce (yellow card) 47'; Vydra 53' (pen.); Bryson (yellow card) 69' | Stadium: Blundell Park; Attendance: 3,033; Referee: Trevor Kettle |

| 12 September 2017 Second round | Barnsley | 3–2 | Derby County | Barnsley |
| 19:45 BST | Jackson 18'; Bradshaw 73'; McCarthy (yellow card) 76'; Hammill 89' | Report | Russell 7'; Bennett 39' (yellow card) 79' | Stadium: Oakwell; Referee: Eddie Ilderton |

== Statistics ==
=== Appearances and goals ===
| No. | Pos | Nat | Player | Total | | Championship | | League Cup | | FA Cup | | Play-offs | |
| No. | Pos | Nat | Player | Apps | Goals | Apps | Goals | Apps | Goals | Apps | Goals | Apps | Goals |
Goalkeepers
| 1 | GK | (England) ENG | Scott Carson | 49 | 0 | 46 | 0 | 0 | 0 | 1 | 0 | 2 | 0 |
| 35 | GK | (England) ENG | Jonathan Mitchell | 2 | 0 | 0 | 0 | 2 | 0 | 0 | 0 | 0 | 0 |
Defenders
| 3 | DF | (Scotland) SCO | Craig Forsyth | 35 | 0 | 31 | 0 | 2 | 0 | 0 | 0 | 2 | 0 |
| 6 | DF | (Republic of Ireland) IRL | Richard Keogh | 45 | 1 | 42 | 1 | 0 | 0 | 1 | 0 | 2 | 0 |
| 12 | DF | (Northern Ireland) NIR | Chris Baird | 23 | 0 | 21+1 | 0 | 1 | 0 | 0 | 0 | 0 | 0 |
| 14 | DF | (England) ENG | Andre Wisdom | 34 | 0 | 29+1 | 0 | 1 | 0 | 1 | 0 | 2 | 0 |
| 16 | DF | (Republic of Ireland) IRL | Alex Pearce | 10 | 1 | 5+2 | 1 | 2 | 0 | 1 | 0 | 0 | 0 |
| 29 | DF | (Sweden) SWE | Marcus Olsson | 16 | 0 | 14+1 | 0 | 0 | 0 | 1 | 0 | 0 | 0 |
| 33 | DF | (England) ENG | Curtis Davies | 48 | 1 | 46 | 1 | 0 | 0 | 0 | 0 | 2 | 0 |
Midfielders
| 7 | MF | (England) ENG | Kasey Palmer | 16 | 2 | 2+13 | 2 | 0 | 0 | 0 | 0 | 0+1 | 0 |
| 8 | MF | (Scotland) SCO | Ikechi Anya | 11 | 0 | 3+4 | 0 | 1+1 | 0 | 0 | 0 | 1+1 | 0 |
| 15 | MF | (England) ENG | Bradley Johnson | 35 | 4 | 25+8 | 4 | 0 | 0 | 0 | 0 | 2 | 0 |
| 26 | MF | (England) ENG | Jamie Hanson | 8 | 0 | 0+6 | 0 | 0 | 0 | 0+1 | 0 | 0+1 | 0 |
| 34 | MF | (England) ENG | George Thorne | 22 | 0 | 9+11 | 0 | 1 | 0 | 1 | 0 | 0 | 0 |
| 36 | MF | (Wales) WAL | Joe Ledley | 26 | 1 | 23+3 | 1 | 0 | 0 | 0 | 0 | 0 | 0 |
| 39 | MF | (England) ENG | Callum Guy | 1 | 0 | 0 | 0 | 0+1 | 0 | 0 | 0 | 0 | 0 |
| 40 | MF | (England) ENG | Max Bird | 1 | 0 | 0 | 0 | 1 | 0 | 0 | 0 | 0 | 0 |
| 44 | MF | (England) ENG | Tom Huddlestone | 47 | 2 | 44 | 2 | 0 | 0 | 1 | 0 | 2 | 0 |
| 45 | MF | (England) ENG | Luke Thomas | 2 | 0 | 0+2 | 0 | 0 | 0 | 0 | 0 | 0 | 0 |
Forwards
| 10 | FW | (Wales) WAL | Tom Lawrence | 44 | 6 | 36+3 | 6 | 1+1 | 0 | 1 | 0 | 2 | 0 |
| 17 | FW | (England) ENG | Sam Winnall | 18 | 6 | 6+11 | 6 | 0 | 0 | 1 | 0 | 0 | 0 |
| 19 | FW | (Austria) AUT | Andreas Weimann | 43 | 5 | 32+8 | 5 | 0 | 0 | 1 | 0 | 2 | 0 |
| 23 | FW | (Czech Republic) CZE | Matěj Vydra | 44 | 22 | 34+6 | 21 | 1 | 1 | 0+1 | 0 | 1+1 | 0 |
| 28 | FW | (England) ENG | David Nugent | 39 | 9 | 29+8 | 9 | 0 | 0 | 0 | 0 | 0+2 | 0 |
| 32 | FW | (England) ENG | Cameron Jerome | 20 | 6 | 8+10 | 5 | 0 | 0 | 0 | 0 | 2 | 1 |
Players transferred or loaned out during the season
| 4 | MF | (Scotland) SCO | Craig Bryson | 5 | 1 | 0+4 | 1 | 1 | 0 | 0 | 0 | 0 | 0 |
| 5 | DF | (England) ENG | Jason Shackell | 2 | 0 | 0 | 0 | 2 | 0 | 0 | 0 | 0 | 0 |
| 7 | FW | (Scotland) SCO | Johnny Russell | 25 | 5 | 13+10 | 4 | 1 | 1 | 1 | 0 | 0 | 0 |
| 9 | FW | (Scotland) SCO | Chris Martin | 25 | 1 | 5+18 | 1 | 2 | 0 | 0 | 0 | 0 | 0 |
| 11 | FW | (England) ENG | Darren Bent | 0 | 0 | 0 | 0 | 0 | 0 | 0 | 0 | 0 | 0 |
| 18 | MF | (England) ENG | Jacob Butterfield | 4 | 0 | 2+1 | 0 | 1 | 0 | 0 | 0 | 0 | 0 |
| 20 | FW | (England) ENG | Mason Bennett | 6 | 1 | 1+2 | 0 | 2 | 1 | 0+1 | 0 | 0 | 0 |
| 25 | DF | (England) ENG | Max Lowe | 0 | 0 | 0 | 0 | 0 | 0 | 0 | 0 | 0 | 0 |
| 41 | MF | (England) ENG | Kellan Gordon | 1 | 0 | 0 | 0 | 0+1 | 0 | 0 | 0 | 0 | 0 |

Last updated: 14 May 2018
