= Bradley Johnson =

English footballer

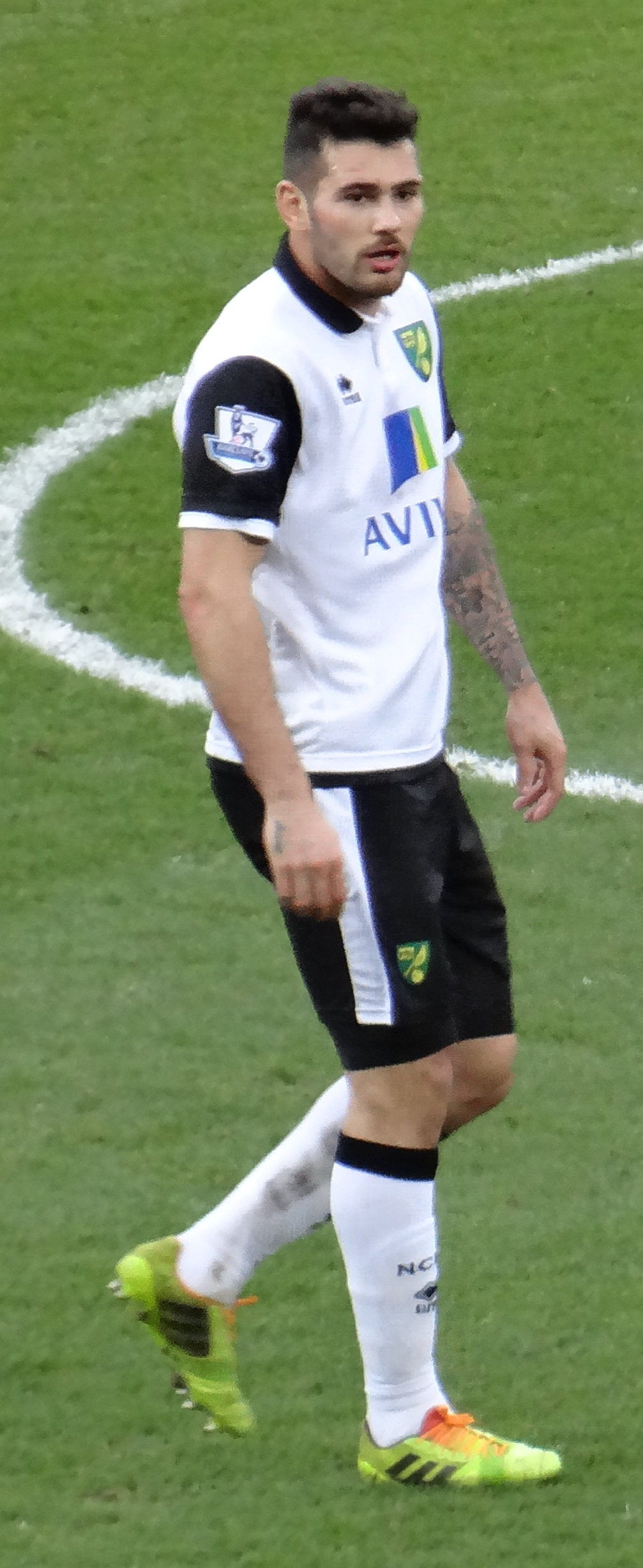
- Johnson playing for Norwich City in 2014

Personal information
- Full name: Bradley Paul Johnson
- Date of birth: 28 April 1987 (age 39)
- Place of birth: Hackney, London, England
- Height: 5 ft 10 in (1.78 m)
- Position: Midfielder

Youth career
- 1997–2002: Arsenal
- 2003–2004: Cambridge United

Senior career*
Years	Team	Apps	(Gls)
2003–2004	Waltham Forest	6	(0)
2004–2005	Cambridge United	1	(0)
2005–2008	Northampton Town	53	(8)
2005–2006	→ Gravesend & Northfleet (loan)	24	(5)
2006	→ Stevenage Borough (loan)	4	(0)
2008–2011	Leeds United	117	(16)
2008–2009	→ Brighton & Hove Albion (loan)	10	(5)
2011–2015	Norwich City	142	(21)
2015–2019	Derby County	125	(14)
2019–2022	Blackburn Rovers	82	(6)
2022–2023	Milton Keynes Dons	41	(5)
2023–2024	Derby County	0	(0)
Total		605	(80)
- * Club domestic league appearances and goals

Bradley Paul Johnson (born 28 April 1987) is an English former professional footballer who played as a central midfielder, he now works as a football coach.

Johnson in a 20-year senior career played for Waltham Forest, Cambridge United, Northampton Town, Gravesend & Northfleet, Stevenage Borough, Leeds United, Norwich City, Derby County, Blackburn Rovers and Milton Keynes Dons. He ended his career as player-coach for Derby County's under-21 team.

Since retirement as a player, Johnson has worked in variety of roles as a coach at Derby County in both the academy and first-team.

== Early life ==
Born in Hackney, Greater London, Johnson was a keen motorcyclist as a child. Johnson's grandfather was originally from the United States. He started his career at his boyhood team Arsenal but was released by the club when he was 15 years old.

== Club career ==
=== Early career ===
After leaving Arsenal, he made six appearances for Waltham Forest F.C., in the Ryman Division 1 North. He then joined the youth ranks at Cambridge United and after breaking into the first team he then moved to league club Northampton Town, where he signed on 16 May 2005. During his time at the club he was sent out on loan twice, playing for Gravesend & Northfleet and Stevenage Borough. Following the appointment of Stuart Gray as Northampton manager, Johnson featured in practically every single starting eleven that he named and he signed a new two-year contract extension.

Johnson began to attract attention from a host of Championship sides, including Coventry City, Colchester United and Queens Park Rangers, but was in talks to sign for Leicester City, after discussing terms at the Walkers Stadium on 2 January 2008. However, the player returned to the Sixfields Stadium, having failed to reach an agreement with the club.

=== Leeds United ===
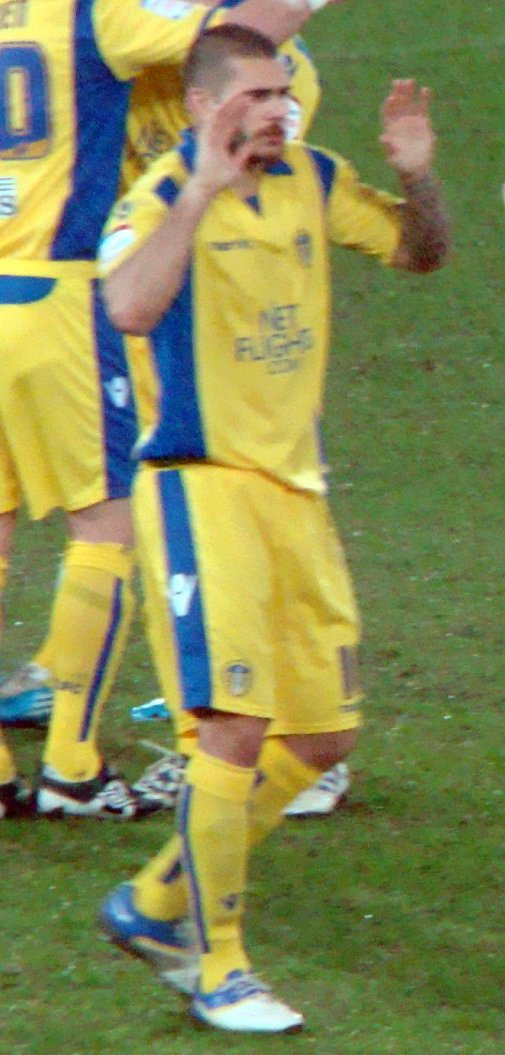
Johnson playing for Leeds United in 2011

Two days later, Leeds United confirmed reports that they had been given permission from Northampton to speak to Johnson, regarding a contract. He went on to sign a three-and-a-half-year deal for £250,000 after undergoing a medical at the club's Thorp Arch training ground on 8 January 2008.

Johnson made his first appearance for Leeds on 14 January 2008 in their league fixture against Crewe Alexandra at the Alexandra Stadium. He scored his first goal for the club at Elland Road in a fixture against AFC Bournemouth on 8 March. Johnson played for Leeds in the League 1 playoff final against Doncaster Rovers at Wembley, but was on the losing side as Leeds lost 1–0.

After struggling to get a first team place under manager Gary McAllister due to the emergence of Fabian Delph, Johnson joined League One rivals Brighton & Hove Albion on loan until 3 January 2009. Johnson scored twice on his debut during the 3–2 victory over Leicester City. Johnson scored four goals in 10 matches on loan at Brighton before returning to his parent club Leeds United, now with a new manager, Simon Grayson. Johnson found himself back in the first team picture as Leeds reached the playoff semi-finals against Millwall.

In November 2010, Johnson turned down the offer of a new three-year deal at Leeds United. Manager Simon Grayson initially confirmed Johnson had rejected a new contract but said that contract negotiations with Johnson would still be ongoing despite his refusal of the first contract offer. On 18 November, Johnson was transfer listed by Leeds after rejecting a final contract offer. Johnson was linked with Premiership clubs Bolton Wanderers and Stoke City.

On 13 January 2011, despite Johnson being on the transfer list, manager Simon Grayson said that he would not be able to sell Johnson unless a replacement had been brought in beforehand. On 18 January, Johnson scored his sixth goal of the season in an FA Cup third round replay against Arsenal at Elland Road, a goal which later won Leeds' goal of the season award.

=== Norwich City ===
Despite ongoing negotiations with Leeds, Johnson was unable to agree a new contract and on 1 July 2011 signed a three-year deal with Norwich City. He was handed squad number 4, which was vacated by Matthew Gill when he was released by the club. Johnson made his Norwich debut in the club's first home match of the Premier League season. Johnson scored his first Norwich goal against Bolton Wanderers on 17 September 2011 at the Reebok Stadium with a "classy header".

Johnson's second season with Norwich was successful as he managed to play regularly for the club. Johnson caught the headlines against Everton for his repeated tangles with midfielder Marouane Fellaini, most notably for cutting Fellaini's leg open with a kick. Norwich finished the season in 11th place, and Johnson's performances in guaranteeing both survival and a mid-table finish led to him being picked 3rd for the Player of the Season, voted by the fans.

During the 2013–14 season, Johnson had a widely praised performance against Tottenham on 23 February, where he was awarded Barclays Man of the Match. He assisted the only goal of the match with a cutting ball to Robert Snodgrass, and almost scored when his free-kick thundered against the crossbar and onto the line.

He scored his first goal of the 2014–15 Championship season on 16 August against Watford at home. It was to be one of his most successful seasons with the club: He was made vice-captain behind Russell Martin and appeared in 44 of the 46 league matches (including one appearance as a substitute). He scored fifteen goals, making him the second highest scorer behind Cameron Jerome, and was voted the fans' Player of the Year. His last two goals for Norwich came in the final match of the regular Championship season as Norwich beat Fulham 4–2 to set-up a play-off semi-final with local rivals Ipswich Town. Johnson also played in the team which beat Middlesbrough 2–0 to win the play-off final and earn promotion to the Premier League.

With Norwich now in the Premier League, Johnson played in the opening match of the 2015–16 season, a 3–1 defeat to Crystal Palace, but failed to start the next three league matches. However, he did captain the side to a 2–1 win over Rotherham United in the League Cup. His last match for the club was an appearance as a 70th-minute substitute in a 3–0 defeat to Southampton on 30 August.

=== Derby County ===
Johnson signed for Derby County for a club record £6 million on transfer deadline day on 1 September 2015. On 26 September 2015, he scored his first goal for the club in a 3–1 win over Milton Keynes Dons. On 26 November 2016, Johnson scored against his former club Norwich City – Derby won the match 1–0.

=== Blackburn Rovers ===
Johnson signed for Blackburn Rovers on a free transfer on 5 July 2019 after being released by Derby County. On 26 September 2020 he scored two goals against his former club in a 0–4 win at Pride Park. Johnson was announced to be leaving the club at the end of the 2021–22 season upon the expiry of his contract.

=== Milton Keynes Dons ===
On 15 July 2022, Johnson joined League One club Milton Keynes Dons on a free transfer. He made his debut on 30 July 2022 as a 37th-minute substitute in a 1–0 defeat away to Cambridge United. On 16 August 2022, Johnson scored his first goals for the club with a brace in a 2–1 home win over Port Vale, setting a new record as the club's oldest ever goalscorer at 35 years and 111 days old. After scoring away at Portsmouth, he broke his own record at 35 years and 227 days old. On 20 December, interim manager Dean Lewington underwent surgery for a hamstring injury, and although Lewington selected the starting line-up, Johnson was in charge on the touchline for the 3–0 League Cup defeat to Leicester City.

Following the conclusion of the 2022–23 season, Johnson was one of nine players released by Milton Keynes Dons following their relegation to League Two.

=== Return to Derby County ===
On 18 July 2023, Johnson returned to Derby County as a player-coach for Derby County's under-21 team. Johnson featured in six Premier League 2 fixtures during the 2023–24 season.

=== Retirement ===
Johnson announced his retirement from professional football on 26 April 2024, ending as 20-year career in which he made over 600 career appearances.

== International career ==
Johnson is eligible to play for the United States through his grandfather who is from there.

== Coaching career ==
Johnson post retirement retained his role working as a coach in the Derby County academy. In February 2025, Johnson worked as an assistant head coach to first-team caretaker manager Matt Hamshaw. In June 2025, Johnson was appointed as lead under-18 coach at Derby County.

== Personal life ==
Johnson has American heritage. He has two younger brothers who, as of 2015, are footballers registered with the Norwich City academy.

== Career statistics ==
As of 7 May 2023

Appearances and goals by club, season and competition
Club	Season	League			FA Cup		League Cup		Other		Total	
Club	Season	Division	Apps	Goals	Apps	Goals	Apps	Goals	Apps	Goals	Apps	Goals
Cambridge United	2004–05	League Two	1	0	0	0	0	0	0	0	1	0
Northampton Town	2005–06	League Two	3	0	0	0	0	0	1 (Note: Appearance(s) in Football League Trophy)	0	4	0
Northampton Town	2006–07	League One	27	5	0	0	1	0	0	0	28	5
Northampton Town	2007–08	League One	23	3	3	1	2	1	1	0	29	5
Northampton Town	Total		53	8	3	1	3	1	2	0	61	10
Gravesend & Northfleet (loan)	2005–06	Conference Premier	24	5	0	0	—		—		24	5
Stevenage Borough (loan)	2006–07	Conference Premier	4	0	0	0	—		—		4	0
Leeds United	2007–08	League One	21	3	0	0	0	0	3 (Note: Appearance(s) in League One play-offs)	0	24	3
Leeds United	2008–09	League One	15	1	0	0	2	0	3 (Note: 1 appearance in Football League Trophy, 2 appearances in League One play-offs)	0	20	1
Leeds United	2009–10	League One	36	7	4	0	3	0	4	0	47	7
Leeds United	2010–11	Championship	45	5	2	1	2	0	—		49	6
Leeds United	Total		117	16	6	1	7	0	10	0	140	17
Brighton & Hove Albion (loan)	2008–09	League One	10	5	0	0	0	0	0	0	10	5
Norwich City	2011–12	Premier League	28	2	1	0	0	0	—		29	2
Norwich City	2012–13	Premier League	37	1	1	0	1	0	—		39	1
Norwich City	2013–14	Premier League	32	3	1	0	3	0	—		36	3
Norwich City	2014–15	Championship	41	15	1	0	0	0	3 (Note: Appearance(s) in Championship play-offs)	0	45	15
Norwich City	2015–16	Premier League	4	0	0	0	1	0	—		5	0
Norwich City	Total		142	21	4	0	5	0	3	0	154	21
Derby County	2015–16	Championship	31	5	1	0	0	0	1	0	33	5
Derby County	2016–17	Championship	33	3	3	0	2	0	—		38	3
Derby County	2017–18	Championship	33	4	0	0	0	0	2	0	35	4
Derby County	2018–19	Championship	28	2	0	0	3	0	3	0	34	2
Derby County	Total		125	14	4	0	5	0	6	0	140	14
Blackburn Rovers	2019–20	Championship	34	3	1	0	0	0	—		35	3
Blackburn Rovers	2020–21	Championship	30	3	1	0	1	0	—		32	3
Blackburn Rovers	2021–22	Championship	18	0	1	0	0	0	—		19	0
Blackburn Rovers	Total		82	6	3	0	1	0	0	0	86	6
Milton Keynes Dons	2022–23	League One	41	5	1	0	1	0	2	0	45	5
Career total			599	80	21	2	22	1	23	0	664	83

== Honours ==
Norwich City

- Football League Championship play-offs: 2015

Individual

- Leeds United Player of the Year: 2010–11
- Leeds United Goal of the Season: 2010–11
- Norwich City Player of the Year: 2014–15
