= 2014–15 Norwich City F.C. season =

Norwich City
2014–15 season
- Chairman: Alan Bowkett
- Manager: Neil Adams (until 5 January); Alex Neil (from 9 January)
- Stadium: Carrow Road
- Football League Championship: 3rd (promoted via play-offs)
- FA Cup: Third round (knocked out by Preston)
- League Cup: Third round (knocked out by Shrewsbury Town)
- Top goalscorer: League: Cameron Jerome (20); All: Cameron Jerome (21)
- Highest home attendance: 27,005 vs Ipswich Town, Championship, 1 March 2015
- Lowest home attendance: 14,414 vs Crawley Town, League Cup, 26 August 2014; 25,595 (Huddersfield Town, 13 December 2014) (League)
- Average home league attendance: 26,367 (Average League Attendance)
Home colours	Away colours

The 2014–15 season was Norwich City Football Club's 113th season as a professional club. It was their first season back in the Football League Championship after their relegation from the Premier League in the 2013–14 season. Neil Adams began the season as manager, to embark on a first full season in charge, however this was not to be as he was replaced by Alex Neil in January 2015. Norwich started the League Cup in the second round and exited in the third round following a defeat at League Two side Shrewsbury Town, and were also eliminated in the FA Cup third round, following a defeat by Preston North End. Norwich finished third in the regular Championship season, qualifying for the play-offs. They were promoted back to the Premier League after a single season's absence by defeating Middlesbrough 2–0 in the play-off final.

== Build up to the season ==
Finishing eighteenth in the Premier League the previous season resulted in relegation to the Championship. The Norwich City board announced shortly after relegation was confirmed on 11 May 2014 that a new manager would be announced within the week. On 22 May 2014 Neil Adams was named as the permanent manager despite the relegation from this season and four defeats in five matches as caretaker manager. The upheaval at the club was not limited to change in the management team with a number of first team players being linked to moves away from Carrow Road including Robert Snodgrass, Gary Hooper and John Ruddy. Chairman Alan Bowkett responded to the reports by stating that the club would be under no pressure to sell players during the transfer window.

On 2 June 2014 Norwich named under-21 coach Mark Robson and former player Gary Holt first team coaches. They also named former player and Ipswich Town manager Joe Royle as football consultant who left the club before the season started.

Norwich went into the season as one of the favourites for promotion with odds of 3/1 for promotion and 10/1 for winning the championship title.

== Transfers ==
=== Transfers in ===
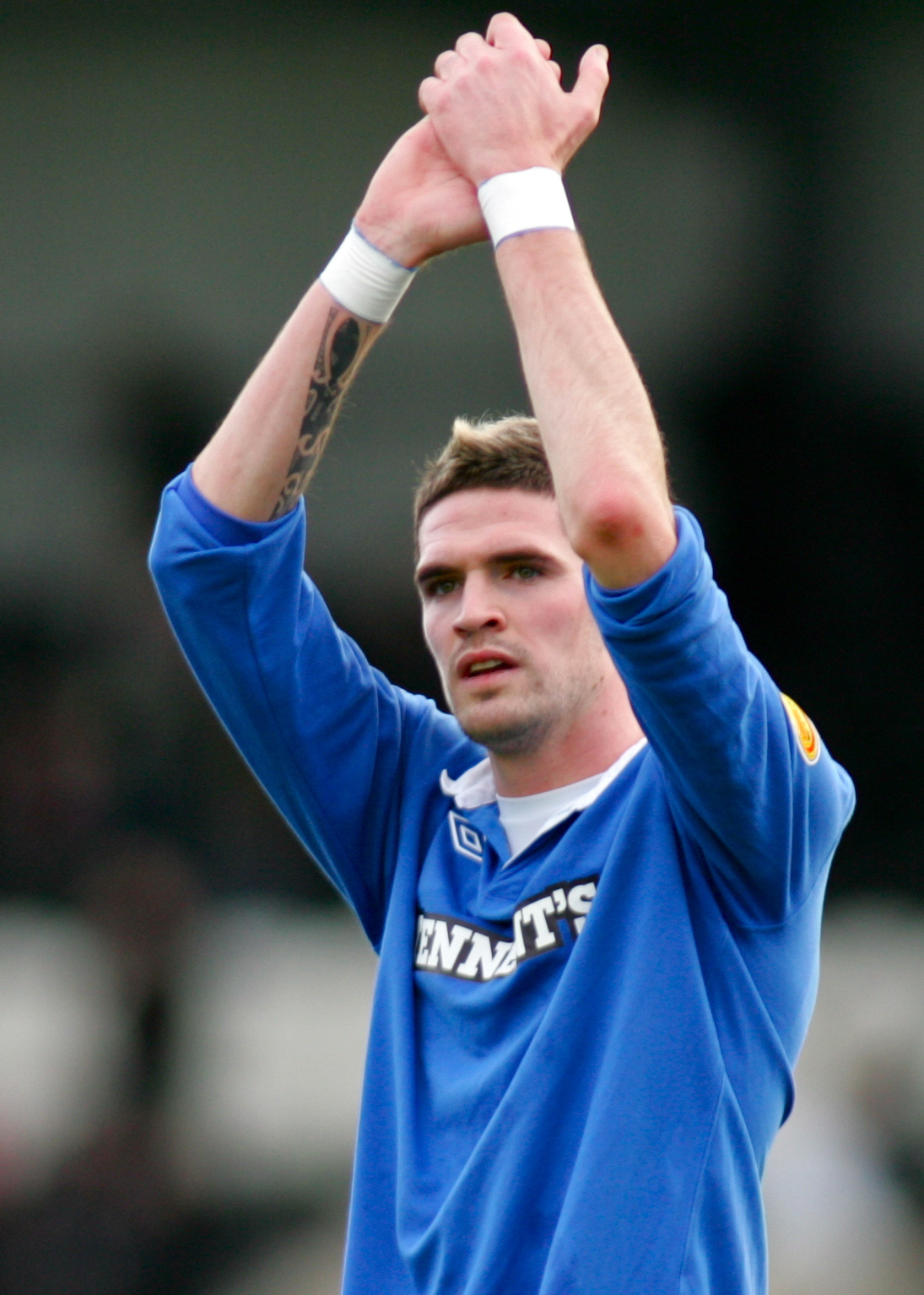
Kyle Lafferty signed for Norwich during the summer transfer window

Norwich started their summer transfer window dealings by signing striker Lewis Grabban from AFC Bournemouth on 5 June. They continued their revamp of their attacking options by signing Kyle Lafferty from 2013–14 Serie B champions Palermo on 27 June with the deal being effective from 1 July. On 5 August Norwich announced the signing of former QPR midfielder Gary O'Neil following his release at the end of the previous season. On 20 August it was announced that Carlos Cuellar had signed a one-year deal following his release from Sunderland at the end of the previous season and that Cameron Jerome had signed from Stoke City on a three-year deal for an undisclosed fee. On 27 August Norwich continued their summer transfer spending by signing 17-year-old Falkirk midfielder Conor McGrandles for a fee reported to be worth a total of £1,000,000 after add-ons. On 29 August Norwich signed Club Brugge midfielder Vadis Odjidja-Ofoe for an undisclosed fee. On transfer deadline day Norwich signed Arsenal's Spanish defender Ignasi Miquel and Swindon Town defender Louis Thompson for both an undisclosed fee on a three-year deal.

Date	No.	Player	Pos	Moving from	Fee	Contract
5 June 2014	7	(England) Lewis Grabban	FW	(England) AFC Bournemouth	Undisclosed	Three-year contract
1 July 2014	9	(Northern Ireland) Kyle Lafferty	FW	(Italy) Palermo	Undisclosed	Three-year contract
5 August 2014	28	(England) Gary O'Neil	MF	(England) Queens Park Rangers	Free	Two-year contract
20 August 2014	3	(Spain) Carlos Cuéllar	DF	(England) Sunderland	Free	One-year contract
20 August 2014	10	(England) Cameron Jerome	FW	(England) Stoke City	Undisclosed	Three-year contract
27 August 2014	38	(Scotland) Conor McGrandles	MF	(Scotland) Falkirk	£1,000,000	Three-year contract
29 August 2014	39	(Belgium) Vadis Odjidja-Ofoe	MF	(Belgium) Club Brugge	Undisclosed	Three-year contract
1 September 2014	15	(Spain) Ignasi Miquel	DF	(England) Arsenal	Undisclosed	Three-year contract
1 September 2014	—	(Wales) Louis Thompson	MF	(England) Swindon	Undisclosed	Three-year contract
3 February 2015	12	(France) Tony Andreu	MF	(Scotland) Hamilton Academical	Undisclosed	Three-and-a-half-year contract

=== Transfers out ===
Players David Fox and Carlo Nash were allowed to leave following the end of their contracts while Johan Elmander, Joseph Yobo and Jonás Gutiérrez all returned to their parent clubs following the end of their loan periods. The first major departure following Norwich's relegation was the sale of Scotland international Robert Snodgrass to Hull for a fee reported to be in the region of £7,000,000 on 30 June 2014. Anthony Pilkington was the next to leave, joining promotion rivals Cardiff City for a reported fee of £1,000,000 on 15 August. Newly promoted Queens Park Rangers completed the transfer of Leroy Fer for a reported fee of £8,000,000 on 20 August. Transfer deadline day saw midfielder Andrew Surman return to Bournemouth for an undisclosed fee.

Date	No.	Player	Pos	Apps	Goals	Moving to	Fee
23 May 2014	20	(England) Carlo Nash	GK	0	0		Released
23 May 2014	25	(England) David Fox	MF	61	1	(England) Colchester United	Released
30 June 2014	7	(Scotland) Robert Snodgrass	MF	61	12	(England) Hull City	£7,000,000
15 August 2014	12	(Republic of Ireland) Anthony Pilkington	MF	75	14	(Wales) Cardiff City	£1,000,000
20 August 2014	10	(Netherlands) Leroy Fer	MF	30	3	(England) Queens Park Rangers	£8,000,000
1 September 2014	29	(England) Andrew Surman	MF	51	7	(England) AFC Bournemouth	Undisclosed

=== Loaned In ===
On transfer deadline day Norwich signed Jos Hooiveld on a season long loan from Southampton.

Date	Player	Pos	Loaned from	Expires	Notes
1 September 2014	(Netherlands) Jos Hooiveld	DF	(England) Southampton	25 January 2015 (Note: This loan deal was supposed to be until 1 July 2015, but on 25 January, the deal was mutually terminated, and Hooiveld joined Millwall on loan.)	
17 February 2015	(Scotland) Graham Dorrans	MF	(England) West Bromwich Albion	25 May 2015	

=== Loaned out ===
Oxford United signed 2013 FA Youth Cup winner Carlton Morris on a half-season loan deal on 4 August 2014. On 5 August club record signing Ricky van Wolfswinkel was allowed to leave on a season long loan to French sign AS Saint-Étienne. On transfer deadline day Luciano Becchio was loaned to Rotherham until January.

Date	Player	Pos	Loaned to	Expires	Notes
4 August 2014	(England) Carlton Morris	FW	(England) Oxford United	23 October 2014	
5 August 2014	(Netherlands) Ricky van Wolfswinkel	FW	(France) Saint-Étienne	30 June 2015	
1 September 2014	(Wales) Louis Thompson	MF	(England) Swindon Town	30 June 2015	
1 September 2014	(Argentina) Luciano Becchio	ST	(England) Rotherham United	1 January 2015	
8 October 2014	(Cameroon) Sébastien Bassong	DF	(England) Watford	9 January 2015	
20 October 2014	(England) Harry Toffolo	DF	(England) Swindon Town	30 June 2015	
1 November 2014	(England) Elliott Bennett	MF	(England) Brighton & Hove Albion	29 December 2014	
3 November 2014	(England) Jacob Murphy	FW	(England) Blackpool	31 December 2014	
27 November 2014	(England) Remi Matthews	GK	(England) Burton Albion	28 December 2014	
27 November 2014	(England) Carlton Morris	FW	(England) York City	4 January 2015	
8 January 2015	(England) Jacob Murphy	FW	(England) Scunthorpe United	7 February 2015	
13 January 2015	(Northern Ireland) Cameron McGeehan	MF	(England) Cambridge United	13 February 2015	
14 January 2015	(Jamaica) Jamar Loza	FW	(England) Yeovil Town	14 February 2015	
2 February 2015	(Northern Ireland) Kyle Lafferty	FW	(Turkey) Çaykur Rizespor	30 June 2015	
14 February 2015	(Northern Ireland) Cameron McGeehan	MF	(England) Luton Town	30 June 2015	
13 March 2015	(England) Michael Turner	DF	(England) Fulham	30 June 2015	
16 March 2015	(England) Josh Murphy	MF	(England) Wigan	15 April 2015	

=== Pre-season matches ===
Norwich started their pre-season on 12 July 2014 with a 1–0 away win at Isthmian League side Dereham Town with new signing Kyle Lafferty scoring the only goal of the game. They continued on 15 July 2014 with an emphatic 6–1 away win at Conference Premier side Braintree Town with goals from Andrew Surman, Kyle Lafferty, Nathan Redmond, Bradley Johnson and two from Ricky van Wolfswinkel. They then started their pre-season tour of Italy by beating an Aosta regional select side 0–13 on 20 July 2014. The match was initially credited as being against Serie D side S.C. Vallée d'Aoste but following a complaint from their opponents Norwich added a correction to their match report which blamed the error to the late nature to the arrangement of the fixture. The matches on 20 July 2014 was initially announced to be played against Novara before they pulled out of the fixtures. A game on 23 July 2014 was initially due to be played against Sampdoria and then Livorno before both teams pulled out of the fixtures. They finished their tour of Italy with a final game against SC Bastia on 25 July 2014 with Anthony Pilkington scoring late on to snatch a draw. Norwich returned to Norfolk to play their first home pre-season game at against OGC Nice on 28 July 2014 where goals from Nathan Redmond, Lewis Grabban, Bradley Johnson, Andrew Surman and Elliott Bennett saw them win 5–1. They concluded their pre-season with a game at Carrow Road against Celta Vigo on 1 August 2014.

12 July 2014	Dereham Town	0–1	Norwich City	Dereham, England
15:00 BST		url-status=deadReport	Lafferty 76'	Stadium: Aldiss Park; Attendance: 2,136

15 July 2014	Braintree Town	1–6	Norwich City	Braintree, England
19:45 BST	Marks 69'	Report	Surman 7'; Lafferty 24' van Wolfswinkel 46', 86'; Redmond 54'; Johnson 62'	Stadium: Amlin Stadium; Attendance: 833

20 July 2014	Novara (Italy)	Cancelled	Norwich City	Stadio Comunale Silvio Piola
TBA BST

20 July 2014	Aosta Valley Select XI (Italy)	0–13	Norwich City	Aosta, Saint-Vincent, Italy
17:00 BST		Report	Hooper 9'; Pilkington 15', 75'; Hoolahan 35'; Martin 36', 44'; Whittaker 38'; Redmond 51'; Loza 58', 71'; Jo. Murphy 61'; Ja. Murphy 76', 87'	Stadium: Piergiorgio Perucca Stadium

23 July 2014	Sampdoria (Italy)	Cancelled	Norwich City	Châtillon/Saint Vincent
TBA BST				Stadium: training venue

23 July 2014	Livorno (Italy)	Cancelled	Norwich City	Châtillon/Saint Vincent
TBA BST				Stadium: training venue

25 July 2014	SC Bastia (France)	1–1	Norwich City	Sallanches
17:00 BST	Kamano 65'	Report	Pilkington 85'	Stadium: Stade d'Honneur; Attendance: 500

28 July 2014	Norwich City	5–1	Nice (France)	Norwich, England
19:45 BST	Redmond 5'; Grabban 9'; Johnson 30'; Surman 44'; E Bennett 61'	url-status=deadReport	Cvitanich 25'	Stadium: Carrow Road; Attendance: 7,327; Referee: Darren Deadman

1 August 2014	Norwich City	2–2	Celta de Vigo (Spain)	Norwich, England
19:45 BST	Grabban 5', 11'	Report	Nolito 27'; Krohn-Delhi 43'	Stadium: Carrow Road; Attendance: 9,829

== Championship Season ==
=== August ===
Norwich started their first season back in the Championship with a defeat at newly promoted Wolverhampton Wanderers by a single goal from David Edwards. Martin Olsson was sent off for two yellow cards during the game and accepted a charge of misconduct for an apparent push on referee Simon Hooper. The first home game of the season was a home fixture against Watford. The away team had Joel Ekstrand sent off after three minutes and goals from Johnson, Grabban and Tettey saw Norwich finish the game with a convincing 3–0 win. Their second home game in four days saw Tom Cairney score for Blackburn after 49 seconds but two goals from Lewis Grabban and one from Bradley Johnson saw them end up 3–1 winners. They followed that up with a victory in their first East Anglian derby since their 5–1 win Portman Road in April 2011. Lewis Grabban scored the only goal in the game which was his fourth goal in three games. Grabban continued his run of scoring by scoring against his former club Bournemouth in the following match but Norwich had to settle for a draw following Callum Wilson's equaliser.

10 August 2014 1	Wolverhampton Wanderers	1–0	Norwich City	Wolverhampton
16:00 BST (UTC+01)	Edwards 64'	Report		Stadium: Molineux Stadium; Attendance: 22,053; Referee: Simon Hooper

16 August 2014 2	Norwich City	3–0	Watford	Norwich
15:00 BST (UTC+01)	Johnson 32'; Grabban 60'; Tettey 61'	url-status=deadReport		Stadium: Carrow Road; Attendance: 26,375; Referee: Paul Tierney

19 August 2014 3	Norwich City	3–1	Blackburn Rovers	Norwich
19:45 BST (UTC+01)	Grabban 23', 90'; Johnson 87'	Report	Cairney 1'	Stadium: Carrow Road; Attendance: 25,835; Referee: Graham Scott

23 August 2014 4	Ipswich Town	0–1	Norwich City	Ipswich
15:00 BST (UTC+01)		Report	Grabban 24'	Stadium: Portman Road; Attendance: 25,245; Referee: Keith Stroud

30 August 2014 5	Norwich City	1–1	Bournemouth	Norwich
15:00 BST (UTC+01)	Grabban 15'	Report	Wilson 45'	Stadium: Carrow Road; Attendance: 25,814; Referee: Stephen Martin

=== September ===
Following the break for the international matches Norwich resumed their league campaign in an away fixture at Cardiff City. First half goals from Joe Ralls and Aron Gunnarson saw Cardiff lead 2–0 at half time but second half goals from Olsson, Hoolahan, Turner and Jerome saw Norwich finish 2–4 winners. The result saw Norwich win the League Managers Association performance of the week award. The following Tuesday saw Norwich travel to a Brentford side who were sixth in the league. After a tight first half finished without a goal Norwich scored three goals in fifteen minutes to go top of the table. The following game at home to Birmingham City saw Norwich come back from a two-goal deficit for the second time within a week. Two goals from Cameron Jerome saw the game finish in a draw. Norwich's next game saw them travel to struggling Blackpool where they conceded the first goal shortly after half time but Norwich scored three second half goals to ensure they came from behind for the third time in four matches and also saw them return to the top of the table. Norwich returned to Carrow Road for the following fixture against Charlton Athletic. Despite dominating the game, with fifteen shots to Charlton's four, Charlton won the game with a late winner.

13 September 2014 6	Cardiff City	2–4	Norwich City	Cardiff
15:00 BST (UTC+01)	Ralls 4'; Gunnarsson 22'	Report	Olsson 54'; Hoolahan 58'; Turner 71'; Jerome 87'	Stadium: Cardiff City Stadium; Attendance: 21,746; Referee: Mark Haywood

16 September 2014 7	Brentford	0–3	Norwich City	Brentford, London
19:45 BST (UTC+01)		Report	Tettey 68'; Jerome 75', 83'	Stadium: Griffin Park; Attendance: 10,074; Referee: Tim Robinson

20 September 2014 8	Norwich City	2–2	Birmingham City	Norwich
15:00 BST (UTC+01)	Jerome 52', 55'	Report	Reilly 8'; Gray 41'	Stadium: Carrow Road; Attendance: 26,351; Referee: Darren Sheldrake

27 September 2014 9	Blackpool	1–3	Norwich City	Blackpool
15:00 BST (UTC+01)	Delfouneso 46'	Report	Daniels 54' (o.g.); Grabban 80'; Murphy 81'	Stadium: Bloomfield Road; Attendance: 11,232; Referee: Andre Marriner

30 September 2014 10	Norwich City	0–1	Charlton Athletic	Norwich
19:45 BST (UTC+01)		Report	Jackson 86'	Stadium: Carrow Road; Attendance: 25,983; Referee: Mick Russell

=== October ===
Norwich saw their run of home games without a win stretch to four when they drew to newly promoted Rotherham at Carrow Road. Rotherham took the lead when a late first half penalty was scored by Paul Green. Cameron Jerome equalised in the second half to earn a point for Norwich. Despite the draw results elsewhere meant that they went into the international break top of the league. Norwich went into the fixture against Fulham having not beaten them since 1986. In the end a single first half goal from Fulham was enough to settle the matter. The following midweek fixture at home to Leeds saw Norwich score the first goal of the game for the first time since the Brentford fixture. The lead lasted only four minutes though and the game finished in a draw. The following match at Sheffield Wednesday finished in a draw and took the poor run of form to five games. The scoreless first half meant that Norwich hadn't scored a first half goal since the end of August, a run of ten league and cup fixtures. That run of games without a first half goal came to an end in the twelfth minute of their victory at home to Bolton Wanderers.

4 October 2014 11	Norwich City	1–1	Rotherham United	Norwich
15:00 BST (UTC+01)	Jerome 77'	Report	Green 44' (pen.)	Stadium: Carrow Road; Attendance: 26,114; Referee: Phil Gibbs

18 October 2014 12	Fulham	1–0	Norwich City	Fulham
15:00 BST (UTC+01)	Kavanagh 22'	Report		Stadium: Craven Cottage; Attendance: 20,776; Referee: Graham Salisbury

21 October 2014 13	Norwich City	1–1	Leeds United	Norwich
19:45 BST (UTC+01)	Martin 59'	Report	Doukara 63'	Stadium: Carrow Road; Attendance: 26,565; Referee: Mark Clattenburg

25 October 2014 14	Sheffield Wednesday	0–0	Norwich City	Sheffield
15:00 BST (UTC+01)		Report		Stadium: Hillsborough Stadium; Attendance: 20,898; Referee: Stuart Attwell

31 October 2014 15	Norwich City	2–1	Bolton	Norwich
19:45 GMT (UTC)	Jerome 12', 61'	Report	Lee 86'	Stadium: Carrow Road; Attendance: 26,070; Referee: Graham Scott

=== November ===
Norwich travelled to Middlesbrough for a midweek fixture at the Riverside Stadium but came away from a match they were never really in contention in with nothing. Middlesbrough scored four goals, the first of which was after only five minutes. Their run of poor form continued when they travelled to Nottingham Forest and conceded two late goals to lose the match 2–1. It was Nottingham Forest's first victory in ten matches.

4 November 2014 16	Middlesbrough	4–0	Norwich City	Middlesbrough
15:00 BST (UTC+01)	Bamford 5'; Leadbitter 33' (pen.), 69'; Wildschut 85'	Report		Stadium: Riverside Stadium; Attendance: 16,468; Referee: Nigel Miller

8 November 2014 17	Nottingham Forest	2–1	Norwich City	Nottingham
15:00 BST (UTC+01)	Assombalonga 85'; Antonio 90+3'	Report	Howson 16'	Stadium: City Ground; Attendance: 24,783; Referee: Andy Madley

22 November 2014 18	Norwich City	3–3	Brighton & Hove Albion	Norwich
15:00 BST (UTC+01)	Howson 38'; Martin 49'; Johnson (yellow card) 56' (yellow-red card) 90+1'; Hooper 85'	Report	Bruno 33'; LuaLua 66'; Colunga 77' (pen.)	Stadium: Carrow Road; Attendance: 26,379; Referee: Geoff Eltringham

29 November 2014 19	Norwich City	1–2	Reading	Norwich
15:00 BST (UTC+01)	Hooper 10'	Report	Cooper 14', 45'	Stadium: Carrow Road; Attendance: 26,002; Referee: David Webb

=== December ===
6 December 2014 20	Wigan Athletic	0–1	Norwich City	Wigan
15:00 GMT		Report	Howson 5'	Stadium: DW Stadium; Attendance: 11,475; Referee: Oliver Langford

13 December 2014 21	Norwich City	5–0	Huddersfield Town	Norwich
15:00 GMT	Johnson 46', 51'; Redmond 48'; Jerome 69'; Grabban 77'	Report	Wallace (red card) 17'	Stadium: Carrow Road; Attendance: 25,595; Referee: Mark Brown

20 December 2014 22	Derby County	2–2	Norwich City	Derby
12:15 GMT	Russell 43'; Martin 55' (pen.)	Report	Jerome 51'; Whittaker 89'	Stadium: iPro Stadium; Attendance: 27,974; Referee: Paul Tierney

26 December 2014 23	Norwich City	6–1	Millwall	Norwich
15:00 GMT	Whittaker 13'; Jerome 18'; Johnson 54', 61'; Hooper 69', 90+1'	Report	Easter 86'	Stadium: Carrow Road; Attendance: 26,714; Referee: Andy D'Urso

28 December 2014 24	Reading	2–1	Norwich City	Reading
15:00 GMT	Robson-Kanu 25' (pen.); Cox 34'	Report	Johnson 71'	Stadium: Madejski Stadium; Attendance: 19,430; Referee: James Linington

=== January ===
10 January 2015 25	Bournemouth	1–2	Norwich City	Bournemouth
15:00 GMT	Ritchie 18' (yellow card) 62'; Arter (yellow card) 20'; Cook (yellow card) 89'	Report	Olsson (yellow card) 16'; Hooper 36'; Jerome (yellow card) 56' (goal) 80'; Howson (red card) 64'	Stadium: Dean Court; Attendance: 11,318; Referee: Chris Foy

17 January 2015 26	Norwich City	3–2	Cardiff City	Norwich
15:00 GMT	Hooper 15'; Lafferty 25'; Jerome 45'	Report	Revell 61'; Harris 64'	Stadium: Carrow Road; Attendance: 25,995; Referee: James Adcock

24 January 2015 27	Norwich City	1–2	Brentford	Norwich
15:00 GMT	Redmond 27'	Report	Jota 21'; Prtichard 71' (pen.)	Stadium: Carrow Road; Attendance: 26,148; Referee: Nigel Miller

31 January 2015 28	Birmingham City	0–0	Norwich City	Birmingham
15:00 GMT		Report		Stadium: St Andrew's; Attendance: 17,835; Referee: Darren Handley

=== February ===
7 February 2015 29	Norwich City	4–0	Blackpool	Norwich
15:00 GMT	Hooper 12', 24', 56' (pen.); Redmond 90'	Report		Stadium: Carrow Road; Attendance: 26,017; Referee: Simon Hooper

10 February 2015 30	Charlton Athletic	2–3	Norwich City	London
19:45 GMT	Watt 61'; Vetokele 68'	Report	Howson 14'; Grabban 43'; Jerome 83'	Stadium: The Valley; Attendance: 15,094; Referee: Andy Woolmer

14 February 2015 31	Norwich City	2–0	Wolverhampton Wanderers	Norwich
15:00 GMT	Johnson 28'; Grabban 67'	Report		Stadium: Carrow Road; Attendance: 26,322; Referee: Neil Swarbrick

21 February 2015 32	Watford	0–3	Norwich City	Watford
15:00 GMT		Report	Grabban 65', 85'; Jerome 70' (pen.)	Stadium: Vicarage Road; Attendance: 18,062; Referee: Carl Berry

24 February 2015 33	Blackburn Rovers	1–2	Norwich City	Blackburn
19:45 GMT	Baptiste 22'	Report	Jerome 65'; Johnson 84'	Stadium: Ewood Park; Attendance: 13,530; Referee: Scott Duncan

=== March ===
Norwich's win over rivals Ipswich Town saw a new all seater stadium record of 27,005 set for Carrow Road. Norwich went on to win the game two goals to nil after goals from Bradley Johnson and Lewis Grabban. It was their fourth East Anglian Derby win in succession.

1 March 2015 34	Norwich City	2–0	Ipswich Town	Norwich
14:05 GMT	Johnson 24'; Grabban 62'; Olsson (yellow card) 76'; Tettey (yellow card) 86'	Report	Skuse (yellow card) 16'; Mings (yellow card) 84'	Stadium: Carrow Road; Attendance: 27,005; Referee: Paul Tierney

4 March 2015 35	Norwich City	0–1	Wigan Athletic	Norwich
19:45 GMT	Howson (yellow card) 34'; Olsson (yellow card) 43'; Jerome (yellow card) 64'; Martin (yellow card) 90+1'	Report	Kim 8'; Pennant (yellow card) 45+2'; Pearce (yellow card) 67'; Waghorn (yellow card) 90+5'	Stadium: Carrow Road; Attendance: 26,208; Referee: Gavin Ward

7 March 2015 36	Millwall	1–4	Norwich City	Bermondsey, London
15:00 GMT	Tonge (yellow card) 62'; Gregory 82' (pen.)	Report	Cuéllar (yellow card) 22'; Howson 38', 60'; Hooper 45+1' (pen.); Hoolahan 57'	Stadium: The Den; Attendance: 11,116; Referee: Keith Stroud

14 March 2015 37	Norwich City	1–1	Derby County	Norwich
15:00 GMT	Jerome 31'; Tettey (yellow card) 41'; Martin (yellow card) 81'	Report	Shotton (yellow card) 34'; Ruddy 66' (o.g.); Albentosa (yellow card) 77'	Stadium: Carrow Road; Attendance: 26,766; Referee: Lee Probert

17 March 2015 38	Huddersfield Town	2–2	Norwich City	Huddersfield
19:45 GMT	Miller 55'; Lynch (yellow card) 75'; Vaughan (yellow card) 90+4' (yellow-red card) 90+6', (goal) 90+5'	Report	Johnson (yellow card) 7'; Hoolahan 67'; Martin (yellow card) 90+3'; Loza 90+8', (yellow card) 90+9'	Stadium: John Smith's Stadium; Attendance: 11,879; Referee: Nigel Miller

21 March 2015 39	Norwich City	3–1	Nottingham Forest	Norwich
15:00 GMT	Olsson (yellow card) 17'; Howson 45+1'; Jerome 56'; Hoolahan 59' (pen.)	Report	Mancienne (yellow card) 66'; Burke 76'	Stadium: Carrow Road; Attendance: 26,976; Referee: James Linington

=== April ===
3 April 2015 40	Brighton & Hove Albion	0–1	Norwich City	Falmer
15:00 BST	Greer (yellow card) 20'; Ince (yellow card) 90+1'	Report	Whittaker (yellow card) 28'; Johnson 62'; Hooper (yellow card) 90+4'	Stadium: Falmer Stadium; Attendance: 28,890; Referee: Andy Davies

6 April 2015 41	Norwich City	2–0	Sheffield Wednesday	Norwich
15:00 BST	Tettey (yellow card) 17'; Johnson 33', 45+1', (yellow card) 55'; Martin (yellow card) 52'	Report	Filipe Melo (yellow card) 6'; McGugan (yellow card) 22'	Stadium: Carrow Road; Attendance: 26,993; Referee: Carl Boyeson

11 April 2015 42	Bolton Wanderers	1–2	Norwich City	Horwich
15:00 BST	Le Fondre 18'; Walker (yellow card) 26'; Moxey (yellow card) 90'	Report	Dorrans 9'; R. Bennett (yellow card) 80'; Hooper 90+3'	Stadium: Macron Stadium; Attendance: 16,027; Referee: James Adcock

14 April 2015 43	Leeds United	0–2	Norwich City	Leeds
19:45 BST		Report	Olsson (yellow card) 25'; Tettey (yellow card) 37'; Howson 57'; Whittaker (yellow card) 63'; Dorrans 90+1', (yellow card) 90+2'	Stadium: Elland Road; Attendance: 21,471; Referee: Mike Jones

17 April 2015 44	Norwich City	0–1	Middlesbrough	Norwich
19:45 BST	Hoolahan (yellow card) 45+3'; Olsson (yellow card) 74'	Report	Tettey 8' (o.g.); Adomah (yellow card) 64'; Clayton (yellow card) 75'	Stadium: Carrow Road; Attendance: 26,933; Referee: Robert Madley

25 April 2015 45	Rotherham United	1–1	Norwich City	Rotherham
15:00 BST	Bowery 86'	Report	Grabban (red card) 26'; Ruddy (yellow card) 31'; Hooper 59'; Jerome (yellow card) 80'; Howson (yellow card) 83'; Johnson (yellow card) 90+4'	Stadium: New York Stadium; Attendance: 11,498; Referee: Mark Brown

=== May ===
2 May 2015 46	Norwich City	4–2	Fulham	Norwich
12:15 BST	Johnson (yellow card) 23', (goal) 36', 90+1'; Redmond 39'; Olsson (yellow card) 75'; Dorrans 81'	Report	Guthrie (yellow card) 90'; Smith 83'; Johnson 90+2' (o.g.)	Stadium: Carrow Road; Attendance: 26,662; Referee: David Coote

=== Play-Offs ===
9 May 2015 SF1	Ipswich Town	1–1	Norwich City	Ipswich
12:15 BST	Anderson 45+4', (yellow card) 84'	Report	Howson 41'; Dorrans (yellow card) 47'; Jerome (yellow card) 58'	Stadium: Portman Road; Attendance: 29,166; Referee: Anthony Taylor

16 May 2015 SF2	Norwich City	3–1	Ipswich Town	Norwich
12:15 BST	Johnson (yellow card) 30'; Hoolahan 50' (pen.); Redmond 64'; Jerome 76'	Report	Berra (red card) 49'; Smith 60'; Skuse (yellow card) 90+4'	Stadium: Carrow Road; Attendance: 26,994; Referee: Roger East

25 May 2015 Final	Middlesbrough	0–2	Norwich City	London
15:00 BST		Report	Jerome 12'; Redmond 15'	Stadium: Wembley Stadium; Attendance: 85,656; Referee: Mike Dean

=== League table ===
Pos	Team	Pld	W	D	L	GF	GA	GD	Pts	Promotion, qualification or relegation
1	Bournemouth (C, P)	46	26	12	8	98	45	+53	90	Promotion to the Premier League
2	Watford (P)	46	27	8	11	91	50	+41	89	Promotion to the Premier League
3	Norwich City (O, P)	46	25	11	10	88	48	+40	86	Qualification for Championship play-offs
4	Middlesbrough	46	25	10	11	68	37	+31	85	Qualification for Championship play-offs
5	Brentford	46	23	9	14	78	59	+19	78	Qualification for Championship play-offs

Updated to match(es) played on 2 May 2015. Source: Sky Sports
Rules for classification: 1) Points; 2) Goal difference; 3) Number of goals scored
(C) Champions; (O) Play-off winners; (P) Promoted

=== Results summary ===
Overall								Home						Away					
Pld	W	D	L	GF	GA	GD	Pts	W	D	L	GF	GA	GD	W	D	L	GF	GA	GD
46	25	11	10	88	48	+40	86	12	6	5	50	24	+26	13	5	5	38	24	+14

Last updated: 2 May 2015.

=== Results by matchday ===
Round	1	2	3	4	5	6	7	8	9	10	11	12	13	14	15	16	17	18	19	20	21	22	23	24	25	26	27	28	29	30	31	32	33	34	35	36	37	38	39	40	41	42	43	44	45	46
Ground	A	H	H	A	H	A	A	H	A	H	H	A	H	A	H	A	A	H	H	A	H	A	H	A	A	H	H	A	H	A	H	A	A	H	H	A	H	A	H	A	H	A	A	H	A	H
Result	L	W	W	W	D	W	W	D	W	L	D	L	D	D	W	L	L	D	L	W	W	D	W	L	W	W	L	D	W	W	W	W	W	W	L	W	D	D	W	W	W	W	W	L	D	W
Position	17	10	6	3	4	2	1	2	1	1	1	4	5	6	3	7	10	10	11	8	7	7	7	7	7	7	8	8	7	7	6	5	5	3	5	5	5	4	4	3	2	2	2	4	4	3

A = Away; H = Home; W = Win; D = Draw; L = Loss

== FA Cup ==
Norwich started their FA cup campaign in the third round of the competition, against Preston North End FC. This proved to be their only game in the competition, as Norwich lost 2–0 at Preston, failing to register a shot on target in the match.

3 January 2015 Third round	Preston North End	2–0	Norwich City	Preston
15:00 GMT (UTC+00)	Gallagher 71', 84'	Report		Stadium: Deepdale; Attendance: 9,807; Referee: Stuart Attwell

== League Cup ==
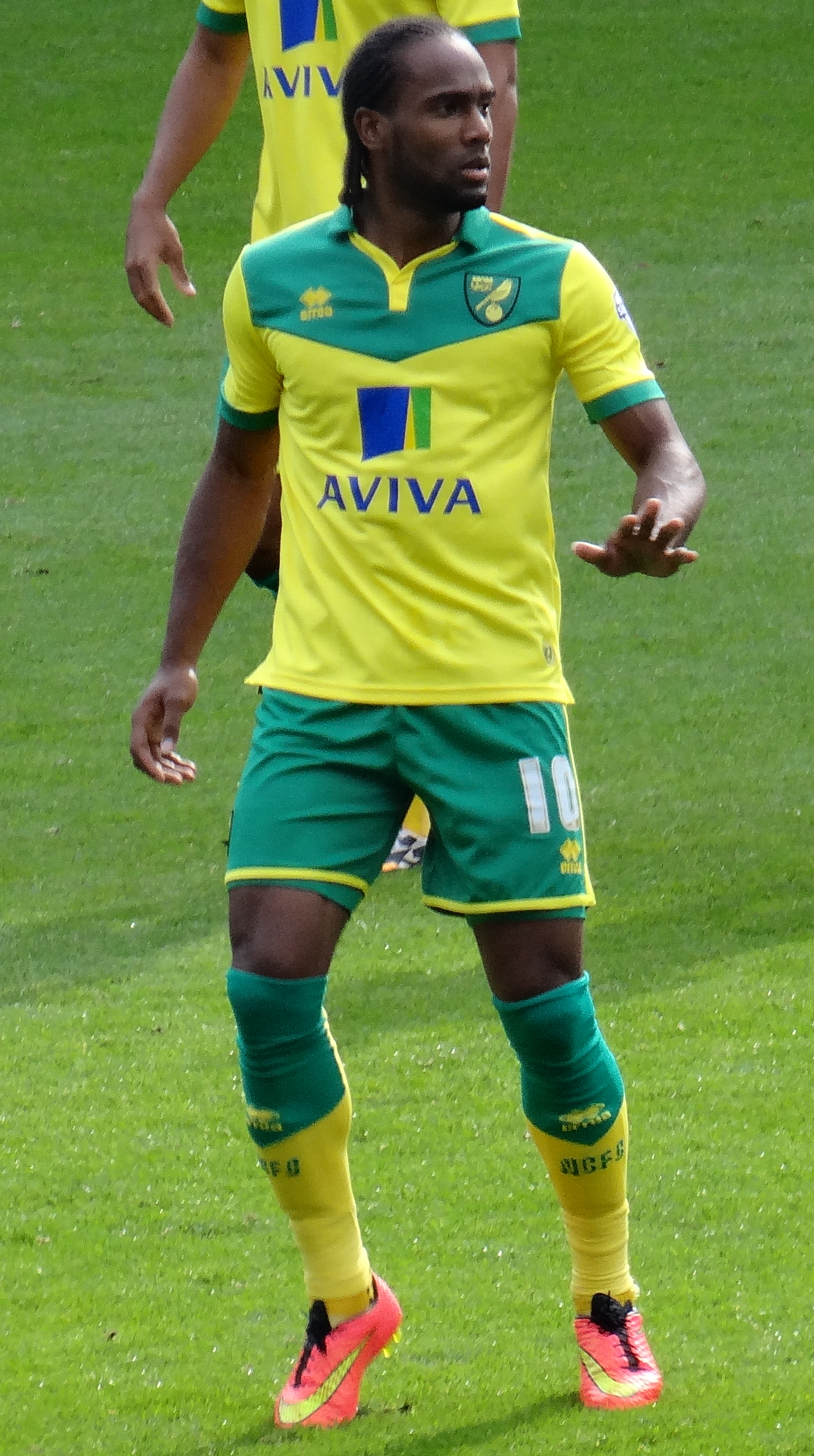
Cameron Jerome scored on his début in Norwich's league cup second round fixture

Norwich will start their league cup campaign in the second round of the competition at home against Crawley Town. In their first ever competitive meeting Norwich City won the match 3–1 with two goals from Josh Murphy and one from Cameron Jerome on his début. Norwich City academy products Kyle Callan-McFadden, who started the match, and Reece Hall-Johnson, who came on as a substitute, both made their professional débuts within the match. Norwich started their third-round match against Shrewsbury Town having made eleven changes from the side that played against Birmingham City the previous Saturday. They lost to a single goal from James Collins.

26 August 2014 Second round	Norwich City	3–1	Crawley Town	Norwich
19:45 BST (UTC+01)	Jerome 14'; Murphy 49', 90'	Report	Cuéllar 55' (o.g.)	Stadium: Carrow Road; Attendance: 14,414; Referee: Darren Deadman

23 September 2014 Third round	Shrewsbury Town	1–0	Norwich City	Shrewsbury
19:45 BST (UTC+01)	Collins 54'	url-status=deadReport		Stadium: Greenhous Meadow; Attendance: 6,187; Referee: Scott Mathieson

== Statistics ==
=== Overall competition record ===
Last updated: 26 May 2015

Competition	Started round	Current position/round	Final position/round	First match	Last match	Record							
Competition	Started round	Current position/round	Final position/round	First match	Last match	P	W	D	L	GF	GA	GD	Win %
2014–15 Championship	—	—	3 (promoted through play-offs)	10 August 2014	25 May 2015	49	27	12	10	94	50	+44	55.10
League Cup	Second round	—	Third round	26 August 2014	23 September 2014	2	1	0	1	3	2	+1	50.00
FA Cup	Third round	—	Third round	3 January 2015	3 January 2015	1	0	0	1	0	2	−2	0.00
Total						52	28	12	12	97	54	+43	53.85

=== Appearances, goals and cards ===
Last updated: 26 May 2015

No.	Pos	Player	Championship			FA Cup			League Cup			Total			Discipline	
No.	Pos	Player	Starts	Sub	Goals	Starts	Sub	Goals	Starts	Sub	Goals	Starts	Sub	Goals	Yellow card	Red card
1	GK	John Ruddy	49	0	0	1	0	0	–	–	–	50	0	0	2	0
2	RB	Steven Whittaker	39	0	2	1	0	0	2	0	0	43	0	2	3	0
3	CB	Carlos Cuéllar	8	0	0	–	–	–	2	0	0	10	0	0	3	0
4	CM	Bradley Johnson	43	1	15	1	0	0	–	–	–	44	1	15	13	1
5	RB	Russell Martin	48	0	2	–	–	–	1	0	0	49	0	2	8	0
7	ST	Lewis Grabban	23	13	12	–	–	–	–	–	–	23	14	12	2	1
8	CM	Jonny Howson	35	2	9	1	0	0	1	0	0	37	2	9	5	1
10	ST	Cameron Jerome	35	9	20	–	–	–	1	0	1	36	9	21	8	0
11	ST	Gary Hooper	16	16	12	1	0	0	1	0	0	18	16	12	2	0
12	MF	Anthony Andreu	0	6	0	–	–	–	–	–	–	0	6	0	0	0
13	GK	Mark Bunn	–	–	–	–	–	–	–	–	–	–	–	–	–	–
14	CAM	Wes Hoolahan	29	10	5	1	0	9	–	–	–	30	10	5	3	0
15	DF	Ignasi Miquel	–	–	–	1	0	0	1	0	0	2	0	0	0	0
16	ST	Jamar Loza	0	2	1	0	1	0	1	1	0	1	4	1	1	0
17	RM	Elliott Bennett	3	7	0	–	–	–	2	0	0	5	7	0	0	0
18	LB	Javier Garrido	3	4	0	–	–	–	1	0	0	4	4	0	1	0
19	ST	Luciano Becchio	–	–	–	–	–	–	0	1	0	0	1	0	0	0
22	RM	Nathan Redmond	31	7	6	1	–	–	–	–	–	32	7	6	1	0
23	LB	Martin Olsson	45	0	1	–	–	–	–	–	–	45	0	1	8	1
24	CB	Ryan Bennett	3	4	0	1	0	0	–	–	–	4	4	0	3	0
26	GK	Declan Rudd	–	–	–	–	–	–	2	0	0	2	0	0	0	0
27	CDM	Alexander Tettey	37	2	2	–	–	–	–	–	–	38	2	2	13	0
28	CM	Gary O'Neil	10	12	0	1	0	0	1	0	0	12	12	0	1	0
29	ST	Carlton Morris	0	1	0	–	–	–	–	–	–	0	1	0	–	–
30	CB	Sébastien Bassong	21	–	–	–	–	–	–	–	–	21	–	–	–	–
31	CB	Adel Gafaiti	–	–	–	–	–	–	–	–	–	–	–	–	–	–
32	GK	Remi Matthews	–	–	–	–	–	–	–	–	–	–	–	–	–	–
33	DF	Kyle Callan-McFadden	–	–	–	–	–	–	1	0	0	1	0	0	1	0
34	MF	Reece Hall-Johnson	–	–	–	–	–	–	0	1	0	0	1	0	0	0
36	MF	Cameron McGeehan	–	–	–	–	–	–	–	–	–	–	–	–	–	–
37	DF	Reiss Awuah	–	–	–	–	–	–	–	–	–	–	–	–	–	–
38	MF	Conor McGrandles	–	–	–	–	–	–	–	–	–	–	–	–	–	–
39	MF	Vadis Odjidja-Ofoe	1	4	0	–	–	–	1	0	0	2	4	0	0	0
40	MF	Cameron King	–	–	–	–	–	–	0	1	0	0	1	0	0	0
41	MF	Graham Dorrans	14	4	3	–	–	–	–	–	–	14	4	3	2	0
Players out on loan:
6	CB	Michael Turner	22	1	1	1	0	0	–	–	–	23	1	1	5	0
9	ST	Kyle Lafferty	11	7	1	0	1	0	1	0	0	12	8	1	7	0
20	ST	Ricky van Wolfswinkel	–	–	–	–	–	–	–	–	–	–	–	–	–	–
21	LM	Josh Murphy	1	12	1	0	1	0	1	0	2	2	13	3	1	0
25	RM	Jacob Murphy	–	–	–	–	–	–	1	0	0	1	0	0	0	0
35	DF	Harry Toffolo	–	–	–	–	–	–	–	–	–	–	–	–	–	–
36	MF	Cameron McGeehan	–	–	–	–	–	–	–	–	–	–	–	–	–	–
–	MF	Louis Thompson	–	–	–	–	–	–	–	–	–	–	–	–	–	–
Players no longer at the club:
10	CM	Leroy Fer	0	1	0	–	–	–	–	–	–	0	1	0	0	0
12	LM	Anthony Pilkington	–	–	–	–	–	–	–	–	–	–	–	–	–	–
12	DF	Jos Hooiveld	6	0	0	–	–	–	–	–	–	6	0	0	0	0
29	CM	Andrew Surman	1	0	0	–	–	–	1	0	0	2	0	0	0	0

=== Goalscorers ===
Rank	Pos.	Player	Champ	FAC	LC	Total
1	ST	Cameron Jerome	20	0	1	21
2	MF	Bradley Johnson	15	0	0	15
3	ST	Lewis Grabban	12	0	0	12
3	ST	Gary Hooper	12	0	0	12
4	MF	Jonny Howson	9	0	0	9
5	MF	Nathan Redmond	6	0	0	6
6	MF	Wes Hoolahan	5	0	0	5
7	MF	Graham Dorrans	3	0	0	3
7	MF	Josh Murphy	1	0	2	3
8	DF	Russell Martin	2	0	0	2
8	MF	Alexander Tettey	2	0	0	2
8	DF	Steven Whittaker	2	0	0	2
9	DF	Martin Olsson	1	0	0	1
9	DF	Michael Turner	1	0	0	1
9	ST	Jamar Loza	1	0	0	1
9	ST	Kyle Lafferty	1	0	0	1
9		Own goal	1	0	0	1
Totals			94	0	3	97
Last updated: 26 May 2015 Sources:

=== Awards ===
- The Norwich City F.C. Player of the Season was awarded to Bradley Johnson, with Wes Hoolahan and Cameron Jerome in 2nd and 3rd place respectively.
- LMA Performance of the week award – Awarded following the second half comeback away at Cardiff City on 13 September 2014.
- Alex Neil awarded Football League Championship Manager of the Month for February 2015.

== See also ==
List of Norwich City F.C. seasons
