= 2015–16 Norwich City F.C. season =

Norwich City
2015–16 season
- Chairman: Alan Bowkett (until 7 December); Ed Balls (from 27 December)
- Manager: Alex Neil
- Stadium: Carrow Road
- Premier League: 19th (relegated)
- FA Cup: Third round
- League Cup: Fourth round
- Top goalscorer: League: Dieumerci Mbokani (7); All: Dieumerci Mbokani (7)
- Highest home attendance: 27,137
- Lowest home attendance: 26,279
- Average home league attendance: 26,972
Home colours	Away colours	Third colours

The 2015–16 season was Norwich City's return to the Premier League after gaining promotion via the play-offs in the previous season, in their 113th year in existence. This season Norwich City participated in the Premier League, FA Cup and League Cup. The season covered the period from 1 July 2015 to 30 June 2016.

== Transfers ==
=== Transfers in ===
Date from	Position	Nationality	Name	From	Fee	Ref.
27 May 2015	CM	SCO	Graham Dorrans	West Bromwich Albion	£3,000,000	
1 July 2015	DM	COD	Youssouf Mulumbu	West Bromwich Albion	Free transfer	
29 July 2015	LW	IRE	Robbie Brady	Hull City	£7,000,000	
1 August 2015	GK	ENG	Jake Kean	Blackburn Rovers	Free transfer	
1 January 2016	LW	ENG	Matt Jarvis	West Ham United	£2,500,000	
8 January 2016	DF	POR	Ivo Pinto	GNK Dinamo Zagreb	Undisclosed	
15 January 2016	MF	ENG	Ben Godfrey	York City	Undisclosed	
18 January 2016	CB	SUI	Timm Klose	VfL Wolfsburg	Undisclosed	
19 January 2016	CF	SCO	Steven Naismith	Everton	£8,500,000	

Total spending: £21,000,000 ▼

=== Transfers out ===
Date from	Position	Nationality	Name	To	Fee	Ref.
1 July 2015	CF	ARG	Luciano Becchio	Belgrano (Note: Following Becchio's release on 27 May 2015, he joined Belgrano on 16 June 2015.)	Free transfer	
1 July 2015	GK	ENG	Mark Bunn	Aston Villa (Note: Following Bunn's release on 27 May 2015, he joined Aston Villa on 9 July 2015.)	Free transfer	
1 July 2015	CB	IRL	Kyle Callan-McFadden	Orlando City B	Free Transfer	
1 July 2015	CB	ESP	Carlos Cuéllar	UD Almería	Free Transfer	
1 July 2015	LB	ESP	Javier Garrido	Las Palmas (Note: Following Garrido's release on 27 May 2015, he joined Las Palmas on 7 August 2015.)	Free Transfer	
1 July 2015	LM	ENG	Sam Kelly	Port Vale FC	Free Transfer	
1 July 2015	CM	NIR	Cameron McGeehan	Luton Town	Undisclosed	
31 July 2015	CB	ESP	Ignasi Miquel	Ponferradina (Note: Following Miquel's release on 31 July 2015, he joined Ponferradina on 30 July 2015.)	Mutual Consent	
1 September 2015	CM	ENG	Bradley Johnson	Derby County	£7,000,000	
5 January 2016	RW	JAM	Elliott Bennett	Blackburn Rovers	Undisclosed	
11 January 2016	ST	JAM	Lewis Grabban	AFC Bournemouth	£8,000,000	
22 January 2016	ST	ENG	Gary Hooper	Sheffield Wednesday	Undisclosed	

Total spending: £15,000,000 ▲

=== Loans in ===
Date from	Position	Nationality	Name	From	Date until	Ref.
29 July 2015	RB	ENG	Andre Wisdom	Liverpool	End of season	
1 September 2015	LW	ENG	Matt Jarvis	West Ham United	End of season	
1 September 2015	CF	COD	Dieumerci Mbokani	Dynamo Kyiv	End of season	
30 January 2016	CF	ENG	Patrick Bamford	Chelsea	End of season	

=== Loans out ===
Date from	Position	Nationality	Name	To	Date until	Ref.
6 July 2015	GK	ENG	Remi Matthews	Burton Albion	2 January 2016	
15 July 2015	ST	ENG	Carlton Morris	Hamilton Academical	1 January 2016	
14 August 2015	ST	ENG	Jacob Murphy	Coventry City	End of season	
21 August 2015	LW	ENG	Josh Murphy	Milton Keynes Dons	End of season	
27 August 2015	CB	ENG	Michael Turner	Sheffield Wednesday	End of season	
31 August 2015	CF	NED	Ricky van Wolfswinkel	Real Betis	End of season	
1 September 2015	CM	FRA	Tony Andreu	Rotherham United	2 January 2016	
1 September 2015	CM	BEL	Vadis Odjidja-Ofoe	Rotherham United	29 September 2015	
11 September 2015	DM	WAL	Louis Thompson	Swindon Town	18 December 2015	
29 October 2015	RB	ENG	Cameron Norman	Woking	End of season	
21 January 2016	CB	ENG	Harry Toffolo	Peterborough United	End of season	
21 January 2016	GK	ENG	Remi Matthews	Doncaster Rovers	End of season	
24 March 2016	ST	NIR	Kyle Lafferty	Birmingham City	End of season	

== Competitions ==
=== Pre-season friendlies ===
On 6 June 2015, Norwich City announced they would host West Ham United to mark Carrow Road's 80th anniversary. This fixture was the first ever played at Carrow Road; Norwich won the game 4–3. Two days later, the Canaries announced their pre-season schedule. Norwich City announced on 6 July 2015, that they would be playing FC Augsburg and Maccabi Haifa in a pre-season training camp in Germany and Austria.

11 July 2015 Friendly	Gorleston	0–7	Norwich City	Gorleston
15:00 BST		Report	Jerome 4', 9', 31'; Andreu 26'; Odjidja-Ofoe 34'; Grabban 69'; Howson 72'	Stadium: Emerald Park; Referee: Mike George

14 July 2015 Friendly	Hitchin Town	0–10	Norwich City	Hitchin
19:45 BST		Report	Jerome 15', 27'; Andreu 51', 62', 74'; Hooper 54'; Hoolahan 57' (pen.); O'Neil 64', 85'; Whittaker 90'	Stadium: Top Field; Attendance: 1,777

17 July 2015 Friendly (120 mins)	Cambridge United	1–3	Norwich City	Cambridge
19:30 BST	Corr 34'	Report	Hooper 59' (pen.); Van Wolfswinkel 62'; Toffolo 90+5'	Stadium: Abbey Stadium; Attendance: 3,890

20 July 2015 Friendly	Maccabi Haifa	1–0	Norwich City	Kufstein, Austria
18:30 CEST	Turgeman 39'	Report		Stadium: Kufstein-Arena

25 July 2015 Friendly	FC Augsburg	1–2	Norwich City	Prien am Chiemsee
14:00 CEST (UTC+2)	Trochowski 51'	Report	Mulumbu 77'; Grabban 89'	Stadium: Am Sportplatz 2

28 July 2015 Friendly	Norwich City	0–1	West Ham United	Norwich
19:45 BST		Report	Toffolo 82' (o.g.)	Stadium: Carrow Road; Attendance: 20,130; Referee: Kevin Friend

29 July 2015 Friendly	Lincoln City	1–0	Norwich City XI	Lincoln
19:45 BST	Muldoon 58'	Report		Stadium: Sincil Bank

1 August 2015 Friendly	Norwich City	2–1	Brentford	Norwich
15:00 BST (UTC+1)	Hoolahan 17'; Jerome 66'	Report	Gray 18'	Stadium: Carrow Road; Attendance: 10,606

=== Premier League ===
==== League table ====
Pos	Team	Pld	W	D	L	GF	GA	GD	Pts	Qualification or relegation
16	Bournemouth	38	11	9	18	45	67	−22	42	
17	Sunderland	38	9	12	17	48	62	−14	39	
18	Newcastle United (R)	38	9	10	19	44	65	−21	37	Relegation to EFL Championship
19	Norwich City (R)	38	9	7	22	39	67	−28	34	Relegation to EFL Championship
20	Aston Villa (R)	38	3	8	27	27	76	−49	17	Relegation to EFL Championship

Source: Barclays Premier League
Rules for classification: 1) Points; 2) Goal difference; 3) Goals scored; 4) Play-offs (only if needed to decide champion, teams for relegation or teams for UEFA competitions).
(R) Relegated

==== Results by matchday ====
Matchday	1	2	3	4	5	6	7	8	9	10	11	12	13	14	15	16	17	18	19	20	21	22	23	24	25	26	27	28	29	30	31	32	33	34	35	36	37	38
Ground	H	A	H	A	H	A	A	H	A	H	A	H	A	H	A	H	A	A	H	H	A	A	H	H	A	H	A	H	A	H	A	H	A	H	A	H	H	A
Result	L	W	D	L	W	D	D	L	L	L	L	W	L	D	L	D	W	L	W	W	L	L	L	L	L	D	L	L	L	D	W	W	L	L	L	L	W	L
Position	20	9	8	14	8	11	13	13	16	16	16	15	16	16	16	17	16	17	15	14	15	16	17	17	18	17	17	18	18	18	17	17	17	18	18	19	19	19

Updated to match(es) played on 15 May 2016. Source: Statto
A = Away; H = Home; W = Win; D = Draw; L = Loss

=== Results summary ===
Overall								Home						Away					
Pld	W	D	L	GF	GA	GD	Pts	W	D	L	GF	GA	GD	W	D	L	GF	GA	GD
38	9	7	22	39	67	−28	34	6	5	8	26	30	−4	3	2	14	13	37	−24

Last updated: 15 May 2016.

==== Matches ====
The Premier League fixture list was released on 17 June 2015. Norwich's first game was at home to Crystal Palace.

8 August 2015 1	Norwich City	1–3	Crystal Palace	Norwich
15:00 BST	Tettey (yellow card) 23'; Redmond 69'	Report	Zaha 39'; Delaney 49'; Cabaye 90'	Stadium: Carrow Road; Attendance: 27,036; Referee: Simon Hooper

15 August 2015 2	Sunderland	1–3	Norwich City	Sunderland
15:00 BST	Lens (yellow card) 9'; Watmore 88'	Report	Bassong (yellow card) 7'; Martin 26'; Whittaker 37'; Tettey (yellow card) 48'; Redmond 57'	Stadium: Stadium of Light; Attendance: 41,379; Referee: Kevin Friend

22 August 2015 3	Norwich City	1–1	Stoke City	Norwich
15:00 BST	Martin 28', (yellow card) 45+1'; Bassong (yellow card) 47'; Tettey (yellow card) 62'; Whittaker (yellow card) 82'	Report	Diouf 11'; Pieters (yellow card) 85'	Stadium: Carrow Road; Attendance: 26,771; Referee: Mike Dean

30 August 2015 4	Southampton	3–0	Norwich City	Southampton
13:30 BST	Pellè 45'; Tadić 64', 67'	Report	Whittaker (yellow card) 27' (yellow-red card) 31'	Stadium: St. Mary's Stadium; Attendance: 29,573; Referee: Jonathan Moss

12 September 2015 5	Norwich City	3–1	Bournemouth	Norwich
15:00 BST	Tettey (yellow card) 20'; Hoolahan (yellow card) 30', (goal) 52'; Jerome 35'; Jarvis 67'	Report	Francis (yellow card) 23'; Smith (yellow card) 25'; Ritchie (yellow card) 60'; Cook 81'	Stadium: Carrow Road; Attendance: 27,018; Referee: Martin Atkinson

20 September 2015 6	Liverpool	1–1	Norwich City	Liverpool
16:00 BST	Milner (yellow card) 3'; Ings 48'	Report	Tettey (yellow card) 53'; Martin 61'; Dorrans (yellow card) 78'	Stadium: Anfield; Attendance: 44,072; Referee: Anthony Taylor

26 September 2015 7	West Ham United	2–2	Norwich City	Upton Park
15:00 BST	Sakho 33'; Kouyaté 90+3'	Report	Brady 9'; Redmond 83'	Stadium: Boleyn Ground; Attendance: 34,857; Referee: Mike Dean

3 October 2015 8	Norwich City	1–2	Leicester City	Norwich
15:00 BST	Mbokani 68'	Report	Vardy 28' (pen.); Schlupp 47'; Huth (yellow card) 63'	Stadium: Carrow Road; Attendance: 27,067; Referee: Mark Clattenburg

18 October 2015 9	Newcastle United	6–2	Norwich City	Newcastle
16:00 BST	Tioté (yellow card) 6'; Wijnaldum 14', 26', 66', 85'; Pérez 33'; Mitrović 64'	Report	Mbokani 20'; Redmond 34'; Dorrans (yellow card) 66'	Stadium: St James' Park; Attendance: 47,006; Referee: Anthony Taylor

24 October 2015 10	Norwich City	0–1	West Bromwich Albion	Norwich
15:00 BST	Howson (yellow card) 22'	Report	Rondón 46'; Brunt (yellow card) 72'; McClean (yellow card) 78'	Stadium: Carrow Road; Attendance: 26,983; Referee: Kevin Friend

31 October 2015 11	Manchester City	2–1	Norwich City	Manchester
15:00 GMT	De Bruyne (yellow card) 34'; Otamendi 67'; Touré 89' (pen.); Fernando (yellow card) 90+3'	Report	Jerome (yellow card) 76', (goal) 83'; Martin (red card) 88'; Tettey (yellow card) 90'	Stadium: City of Manchester Stadium; Attendance: 53,418; Referee: Robert Madley

7 November 2015 12	Norwich City	1–0	Swansea City	Norwich
15:00 GMT	Howson 70'; O'Neil (yellow card) 90+6'	Report		Stadium: Carrow Road; Attendance: 27,029; Referee: Mark Clattenburg

21 November 2015 13	Chelsea	1–0	Norwich City	London
15:00 GMT	Willian (yellow card) 35'; Costa 64'	Report	Mulumbu (yellow card) 31'; O'Neil (yellow card) 47'; Bassong (yellow card) 61'; Olsson (yellow card) 69'	Stadium: Stamford Bridge; Attendance: 41,582; Referee: Craig Pawson

29 November 2015 14	Norwich City	1–1	Arsenal	Norwich
16:15 GMT	Grabban 43'; O'Neil (yellow card) 57'	Report	Özil 30'; Cazorla (yellow card) 54'	Stadium: Carrow Road; Attendance: 27,091; Referee: Jonathan Moss

5 December 2015 15	Watford	2–0	Norwich City	Watford
15:00 GMT	Deeney 30' (pen.), (yellow card) 56'; Watson (yellow card) 60'; Ighalo 90+1', (yellow card) 90+2'	Report	Tettey (yellow card) 29'; Bennett (yellow card) 76'; Brady (yellow card) 87'	Stadium: Vicarage Road; Attendance: 20,422; Referee: Mike Dean

12 December 2015 16	Norwich City	1–1	Everton	Norwich
12:45 GMT	Hoolahan 47'; Martin (yellow card) 90+2'	Report	Lukaku 15'	Stadium: Carrow Road; Attendance: 27,027; Referee: Martin Atkinson

19 December 2015 17	Manchester United	1–2	Norwich City	Manchester
15:00 GMT	Martial 66'	Report	O'Neil (yellow card) 27'; Jerome 38'; Brady (yellow card) 52'; Tettey 54'	Stadium: Old Trafford; Attendance: 75,320; Referee: Michael Oliver

26 December 2015 18	Tottenham Hotspur	3–0	Norwich City	London
15:00 GMT	Kane 26' (pen.), 42'; Dier (yellow card) 74'; Carroll 80'	Report	Tettey (yellow card) 45+1'; Howson (yellow card) 77'	Stadium: White Hart Lane; Attendance: 35,198; Referee: Mike Jones

28 December 2015 19	Norwich City	2–0	Aston Villa	Norwich
15:00 GMT	Howson 24'; R. Bennett (yellow card) 61'; Mbokani 87'; Martin (yellow card) 90+3'	Report	Veretout (yellow card) 42'; Gueye (yellow card) 77'; Ayew (yellow card) 90'; Westwood (yellow card) 90+2'; Richards (yellow card) 90+3'	Stadium: Carrow Road; Attendance: 27,071; Referee: Graham Scott

2 January 2016 20	Norwich City	1–0	Southampton	Norwich
15:00 GMT	Tettey 76'; Rudd (yellow card) 88'	Report	Wanyama (yellow card) 35' (yellow-red card) 73'	Stadium: Carrow Road; Attendance: 27,022; Referee: Mark Clattenburg

13 January 2016 21	Stoke City	3–1	Norwich City	Stoke-on-Trent
19:45 GMT	Jonathan Walters 49'; Joselu 67'; Bennett 78' (o.g.)	Report	O'Neil (red card) 31'; Howson 55'; Tettey (yellow card) 77'	Stadium: Britannia Stadium; Attendance: 27,274; Referee: Neil Swarbrick

16 January 2016 22	Bournemouth	3–0	Norwich City	Bournemouth
15:00 GMT	Gosling 10'; Arter (yellow card) 48'; Daniels 54' (pen.); Afobe 75'	Report	Rudd (yellow card) 43'	Stadium: Vitality Stadium; Attendance: 11,065; Referee: Robert Madley

23 January 2016 23	Norwich City	4–5	Liverpool	Norwich
12:45 GMT	Mbokani 29'; Naismith 41'; Hoolahan 54' (pen.); Bassong 90+2'	Report	Firmino 18', 63'; Henderson 55'; Milner 75'; Lallana 90+5', (yellow card) 90+5'	Stadium: Carrow Road; Attendance: 27,108; Referee: Lee Mason

2 February 2016 24	Norwich City	0–3	Tottenham Hotspur	Norwich
19:45 GMT	Bassong (yellow card) 29'; Tettey (yellow card) 89'	Report	Alli 2'; Kane 30' (pen.), 90'; Alderweireld (yellow card) 58'; Rose (yellow card) 88'	Stadium: Carrow Road; Attendance: 27,067; Referee: Kevin Friend

6 February 2016 25	Aston Villa	2–0	Norwich City	Aston
15:00 GMT	Lescott 45'; Agbonlahor 51'	Report	Howson (yellow card) 12'; Klose (yellow card) 77'	Stadium: Villa Park; Attendance: 32,472; Referee: Martin Atkinson

13 February 2016 26	Norwich City	2–2	West Ham United	Norwich
15:00 GMT	Naismith (yellow card) 33'; Brady 54'; Hoolahan 65'; Howson (yellow card) 90+2'	Report	Collins (yellow card) 23'; Obiang (yellow card) 32'; Payet 74'; Noble 76'	Stadium: Carrow Road; Attendance: 27,101; Referee: Mike Jones

27 February 2016 27	Leicester City	1–0	Norwich City	Leicester
15:00 GMT	Ulloa 89'	Report	Naismith (yellow card) 48'; Bennett (yellow card) 51'	Stadium: King Power Stadium; Attendance: 32,114; Referee: Neil Swarbrick

1 March 2016 28	Norwich City	1–2	Chelsea	Norwich
19:45 GMT	Howson (yellow card) 13'; Bennett (yellow card) 39'; Redmond 68'; Klose (yellow card) 76'	Report	Kenedy 1'; Oscar (yellow card) 44'; Diego Costa 45+1'; Fàbregas (yellow card) 73'	Stadium: Carrow Road; Attendance: 27,091; Referee: Lee Mason

5 March 2016 29	Swansea City	1–0	Norwich City	Swansea
15:00 GMT	Taylor (yellow card) 34'; Sigurðsson 61'; Rangel (yellow card) 90+4'	Report	Jerome (yellow card) 13'; Brady (yellow card) 17'; Bennett (yellow card) 46'; Martin (yellow card) 50'; O'Neil (yellow card) 57'	Stadium: Liberty Stadium; Attendance: 20,929; Referee: Craig Pawson

12 March 2016 30	Norwich City	0–0	Manchester City	Norwich
12:45 GMT	Bennett (yellow card) 12'; O'Neil (yellow card) 50'; Howson (yellow card) 74'	Report	Otamendi (yellow card) 26'	Stadium: Carrow Road; Attendance: 26,323; Referee: Jon Moss

19 March 2016 31	West Bromwich Albion	0–1	Norwich City	West Bromwich
15:00 GMT	McAuley (yellow card) 90'	Report	Brady 50'; Odjidja-Ofoe (yellow card) 81'; Howson (yellow card) 90+5'	Stadium: The Hawthorns; Attendance: 25,039; Referee: Anthony Taylor

2 April 2016 32	Norwich City	3–2	Newcastle United	Norwich
15:00 BST	Klose 45+2'; Mbokani 74'; Olsson 90+3'	Report	Mitrović 71', 86' (pen.)	Stadium: Carrow Road; Attendance: 27,137; Referee: Mike Dean

9 April 2016 33	Crystal Palace	1–0	Norwich City	London
15:00 BST	Puncheon 68'			Stadium: Selhurst Park; Attendance: 24,960; Referee: Michael Oliver

16 April 2016 34	Norwich City	0–3	Sunderland	Norwich
12:45 BST		Report	Borini 41' (pen.); Defoe 53'; Watmore 90+1'	Stadium: Carrow Road; Attendance: 27,117; Referee: Andre Marriner

30 April 2016 35	Arsenal	1–0	Norwich City	London
17:30 BST	Welbeck 59'; Özil (yellow card) 85'	Report		Stadium: Emirates Stadium; Attendance: 59,989; Referee: Mike Jones

7 May 2016 36	Norwich City	0–1	Manchester United	Norwich
12:45 BST	O'Neil (yellow card) 90+2'	Report	Mata 72'	Stadium: Carrow Road; Attendance: 27,132; Referee: Craig Pawson

11 May 2016 37	Norwich City	4–2	Watford	Norwich
19:45 BST	Redmond 15'; Mbokani 18', 57'; Cathcart 37' (o.g.); Bennett (yellow card) 47'; Odjidja-Ofoe (yellow card) 84'	Report	Deeney 11'; Abdi (yellow card) 43'; Ighalo 51'; Watson (yellow card) 67'; Aké (yellow card) 83'	Stadium: Carrow Road; Attendance: 26,279; Referee: Roger East

15 May 2016 38	Everton	3–0	Norwich City	Liverpool
15:00 BST	McCarthy 19'; Baines 44' (pen.); Mirallas 48'	Report		Stadium: Goodison Park; Attendance: 36,691; Referee: Lee Mason

=== FA Cup ===
Norwich City entered the competition in the third round and were drawn at home to Manchester City.

9 January 2016 Third round	Norwich City	0–3	Manchester City	Norwich
15:00 GMT	Martin (yellow card) 48'; Dorrans (yellow card) 84'	Report	Agüero 16'; Iheanacho 31'; De Bruyne 78'	Stadium: Carrow Road; Attendance: 24,507; Referee: Mike Dean

=== League Cup ===
Norwich City entered the competition in the second round and were given an away trip to Rotherham United. The third round draw was made on 25 August 2015 live on Sky Sports by Charlie Nicholas and Phil Thompson. Norwich City drew West Bromwich Albion at home.

25 August 2015 Second round	Rotherham United	1–2	Norwich City	Rotherham
19:45 BST	Green 80'	Report	Howson 22'; Van Wolfswinkel 68'	Stadium: AESSEAL New York Stadium; Attendance: 5,648; Referee: Kevin Wright

23 September 2015 Third round	Norwich City	3–0	West Bromwich Albion	Norwich
19:45 BST	Jarvis 62'; Lafferty 85'; Pocognoli 90' (o.g.)	Report		Stadium: Carrow Road; Attendance: 19,015; Referee: Craig Pawson

27 October 2015 Fourth round	Everton	1–1 (a.e.t.) (4–3 p)	Norwich City	Liverpool
19:45 GMT	Osman 68'	Report	Bassong 51'	Stadium: Goodison Park; Attendance: 31,964; Referee: Roger East
	Penalties
	Deulofeu (penalty scored); Barkley (penalty scored); Lukaku (penalty scored); Gibson (penalty scored)		(penalty scored) Dorrans; (penalty scored) Whittaker; (penalty missed) Hoolahan; (penalty scored) Grabban; (penalty missed) Redmond

== Statistics ==
=== Appearances, goals and cards ===
Players with no appearances not included in the list.

No.	Pos	Player	Premier League			FA Cup			League Cup			Total			Discipline	
No.	Pos	Player	Starts	Sub	Goals	Starts	Sub	Goals	Starts	Sub	Goals	Starts	Sub	Goals	Booked	Sent off (straight red)
1	GK	John Ruddy	27	0	0	1	0	0	–	–	–	28	0	0	0	0
2	RB	Steven Whittaker	8	0	1	–	–	–	0	1	0	8	1	1	1	1
3	RB	Andre Wisdom	9	1	0	1	0	0	3	0	0	13	1	0	1	0
5	CB	Russell Martin	30	0	3	1	0	0	–	–	–	31	0	3	5	1
6	CB	Sébastien Bassong	30	2	1	1	0	0	3	0	1	34	2	2	5	0
7	CAM	Steven Naismith	11	2	1	–	–	–	–	–	–	11	2	1	2	0
8	CM	Jonny Howson	33	3	3	1	0	0	1	1	1	35	4	4	7	0
9	ST	Dieumerci Mbokani	15	13	7	–	–	–	1	0	0	16	13	7	0	0
10	ST	Cameron Jerome	19	15	3	1	0	0	–	–	–	20	15	3	2	0
11	ST	Patrick Bamford	2	5	0	–	–	–	–	–	–	2	5	0	0	0
12	MF	Robbie Brady	34	2	3	–	–	–	–	–	–	34	2	3	3	0
13	GK	Declan Rudd	11	0	0	–	–	–	3	0	0	13	0	0	2	0
14	CAM	Wes Hoolahan	25	5	4	–	–	–	1	1	0	26	6	4	1	0
16	LM	Matt Jarvis	11	7	1	–	–	–	1	1	1	12	8	2	0	0
17	CB	Timm Klose	10	0	1	–	–	–	–	–	–	10	0	1	3	0
18	MF	Graham Dorrans	14	7	0	1	0	0	1	2	0	16	9	0	3	0
20	MF	Anthony Andreu	–	–	–	–	–	–	0	1	0	0	1	0	0	0
21	MF	Youssouf Mulumbu	5	2	0	1	0	0	1	0	0	6	2	0	2	0
22	RM	Nathan Redmond	24	11	6	0	1	0	1	0	0	25	12	6	0	0
23	LB	Martin Olsson	20	4	1	1	0	0	1	0	0	22	4	1	2	0
24	CB	Ryan Bennett	20	2	0	1	0	0	2	0	0	23	2	0	7	0
25	RB	Ivo Pinto	9	1	0	–	–	–	–	–	–	9	1	0	0	0
27	CDM	Alexander Tettey	23	0	2	–	–	–	–	–	–	23	0	2	10	0
28	CM	Gary O'Neil	19	8	0	0	1	0	2	0	0	21	9	0	7	1
32	MF	Vadis Odjidja-Ofoe	3	7	0	1	0	0	2	0	0	5	8	0	2	0
Players out on loan:
19	ST	Kyle Lafferty	0	1	0	0	1	0	0	1	1	0	3	1	0	0
15	DF	Harry Toffolo	–	–	–	–	–	–	1	0	0	1	0	0	0	0
29	ST	Ricky van Wolfswinkel	–	–	–	–	–	–	1	0	1	1	0	1	0	0
Players now not at club:
4	CM	Bradley Johnson	1	3	0	–	–	–	1	0	0	2	3	0	1	0
7	ST	Lewis Grabban	3	3	1	–	–	–	2	0	0	5	3	1	0	0
11	ST	Gary Hooper	0	2	0	–	–	–	–	–	–	0	2	0	0	0
17	RM	Elliott Bennett	–	–	–	–	–	–	1	1	0	1	1	0	0	0

=== Goalscorers ===
Rank	Pos.	Player	Premier League	FA Cup	League Cup	Total
1	ST	Dieumerci Mbokani	7	0	0	7
2	MF	Nathan Redmond	6	0	0	6
3	CAM	Wes Hoolahan	4	0	0	4
3	MF	Jonny Howson	3	0	1	4
5	DF	Russell Martin	3	0	0	3
5	ST	Cameron Jerome	3	0	0	3
5	LM/LB	Robbie Brady	3	0	0	3
8	CM	Alexander Tettey	2	0	0	2
8	CB	Sébastien Bassong	1	0	1	2
8	LM	Matt Jarvis	1	0	1	2
11	RB	Steven Whittaker	1	0	0	1
11	ST	Lewis Grabban	1	0	0	1
11	CAM	Steven Naismith	1	0	0	1
11	CB	Timm Klose	1	0	0	1
11	LB	Martin Olsson	1	0	0	1
11	ST	Kyle Lafferty	0	0	1	1
11	ST	Ricky van Wolfswinkel	0	0	1	1
Own goals			1	0	1	2
Totals			39	0	6	45
