= Alexander Tettey =

Ghanaian-born Norwegian footballer (born 1986)

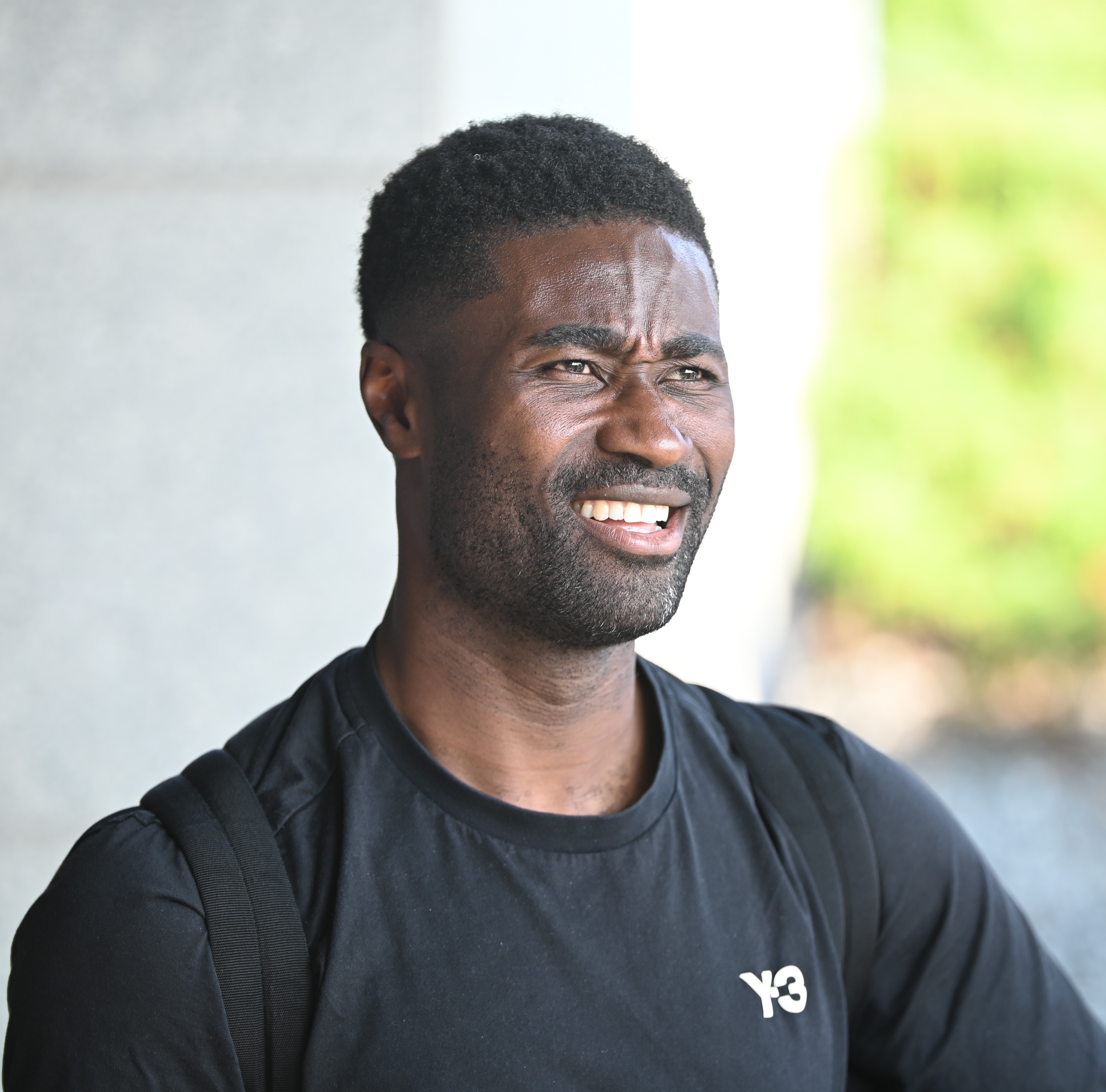
- Tettey in 2026

Personal information
- Full name: Alexander Banor Tettey
- Date of birth: 4 April 1986 (age 40)
- Place of birth: Accra, Ghana
- Position: Defensive midfielder

Youth career
- 1999–2002: Bodø/Glimt
- 2002–2003: Kolstad

Senior career*
Years	Team	Apps	(Gls)
2003–2009	Rosenborg	89	(12)
2005	→ Skeid (loan)	5	(2)
2009–2012	Rennes	60	(2)
2012–2021	Norwich City	244	(7)
2021	Rosenborg	6	(0)
Total		404	(23)

International career
2004	Norway U18	7	(0)
2005	Norway U19	8	(0)
2006–2008	Norway U21	14	(0)
2007–2016	Norway	34	(3)

Managerial career
- 2024–: Rosenborg (assistant)
- 2026: Rosenborg (interim)
- * Club domestic league appearances and goals

Alexander Banor Tettey (born 4 April 1986) is a former professional footballer who played as a defensive midfielder. Born in Ghana, he represented the Norway national team.

Having started his professional career with local Norwegian side Rosenborg in 2003, he went on to sign for French club Rennes, and later moved to English side Norwich City in 2012, where he went on to also become captain across nine years for the club.

== Early life ==
Tettey was born in Accra, Ghana, and moved to Bodø Municipality in Norway in 1999. He later moved to Trondheim Municipality, and started to play football for Kolstad. After joining Rosenborg's youth department, Tettey made his debut for the first team in a friendly match against GIF Sundsvall in January 2003, and in September 2003 he joined the first team squad and became the youngest player in Rosenborg's first team squad since Ola By Rise, Knut Torbjørn Eggen and Øivind Husby in 1977.

== Club career ==
=== Rosenborg ===
Tettey started his career in Rosenborg as a central midfielder, but under Knut Tørum in 2007 he was made a defensive midfielder. In the 2008 season he was appointed Rosenborg's vice-captain and with club legend Roar Strand in and out of the team Tettey was a frequent captain.

=== Rennes ===
During his stay in Rosenborg, Tettey was being closely followed by French club Rennes, as they looked to create a squad with the potential of winning the title. On 31 July 2009, he signed a four-year contract with the French club. Tettey got his debut for the club shortly thereafter, but got injured in his first match for the club . His stay in Rennes has thereafter been plagued with injuries, but Tettey has nonetheless managed to pick up 60 appearances for the club. On 9 January 2011, Tettey scored his first goal in the Round of 64 of the French Cup. He scored the first of Rennes' goals as well the fifth in their 7–0 win over Cannes.

=== Norwich City ===
On 25 August 2012, Tettey signed for Premier League club Norwich City on a two-year deal for an undisclosed fee. He scored on his debut, scoring the only goal of the game in a 1–0 win against Doncaster Rovers on 26 September in the League Cup. He was also named man of the match, and stated he hoped his performance had been enough to earn him a start in a Premier League game. He made his league debut three days later, replacing Steve Morison in the 79th minute of a 5–2 defeat against Liverpool at Carrow Road. He made his first league start on 6 October against European champions Chelsea, however he could not prevent Norwich falling to a 4–1 defeat after Grant Holt had given the Canaries an 11th-minute lead. He made his full home debut on 20 October, helping Norwich to a shock 1–0 win against Arsenal after another goal from Holt. He became a regular in the team until he suffered an injury in February 2013, which persisted and kept him out of action for a longer period than initially thought. After over a month out, he made his return to playing on 30 March, replacing Jonny Howson in the 85th minute of a 1–0 defeat away to relegation rivals Wigan Athletic. He played in the final game of the season on 19 May, as Norwich produced a shock result to beat Manchester City 3–2 at the City of Manchester Stadium, to inflict only their second home defeat in the last 48 games, and to give Norwich their highest Premier League finish of 11th since they finished third in the 1992–93 season.

On 1 November 2013, it was announced that Tettey would be ruled out for 'a couple of months' following ankle surgery, which was performed after a stoppage-time collision with Cardiff City player Fraizer Campbell had left the ankle "very sore". On 22 March 2014, he scored his first league goal for Norwich with a 30-yard volley against Sunderland in a 2–0 win. It was described as one of the goals of the season. In December 2018, Tettey made his 200th appearance for Norwich City. In the final game of the 2019–20 season Tettey made his 100th Premier League appearance in a 5–0 defeat to Manchester City at the City of Manchester Stadium.

On 4 May 2021, Norwich announced Tettey would leave the club at the end of the 2020–21 season; during his time at the club, Tettey captained the club across three seasons, and made a total of 263 appearances in all competitions for the club, scoring eight goals. In his last season at the club, Tettey helped mentor and coach BADU Sports, a London-based organisation for children and young adults.

=== Return to Rosenborg ===
After leaving Norwich, Tettey signed for his former club Rosenborg and was handed the number 6 shirt, a shirt number not worn by a player since Rosenborg legend and fellow Norwegian Roar Strand retired in 2010.

== International career ==
Tettey is a naturalized Norwegian and has been capped for the Norwegian under-18, under-19 and under-21 youth teams, as well as the senior team. Tettey made his debut for Norway on 22 August 2007, playing in a 2–1 friendly win against Argentina. Over the course of a nine-year international career, Tettey made 34 caps for Norway, scoring three times.

== Career statistics ==
=== Club ===
As of 17 October 2021

Appearances and goals by club, season and competition
Club	Season	League			National cup		League cup		Europe		Other		Total	
Club	Season	Division	Apps	Goals	Apps	Goals	Apps	Goals	Apps	Goals	Apps	Goals	Apps	Goals
Rosenborg	2003	Tippeligaen	0	0	0	0	—		0	0	—		0	0
Rosenborg	2004	Tippeligaen	1	0	0	0	—		0	0	—		1	0
Rosenborg	2005	Tippeligaen	2	0	0	0	—		4	0	—		6	0
Rosenborg	2006	Tippeligaen	22	1	4	1	—		0	0	—		26	2
Rosenborg	2007	Tippeligaen	23	4	4	1	—		11	0	—		38	5
Rosenborg	2008	Tippeligaen	24	2	2	1	—		8	0	—		34	3
Rosenborg	2009	Tippeligaen	17	5	3	0	—		4	0	—		24	5
Rosenborg	Total		89	12	13	3	—		27	0	—		129	15
Skeid (loan)	2005	Adeccoligaen	5	2	0	0	—		—		—		5	2
Rennes	2009–10	Ligue 1	24	0	2	0	2	0	0	0	—		28	0
Rennes	2010–11	Ligue 1	17	1	3	3	0	0	0	0	—		20	4
Rennes	2011–12	Ligue 1	19	1	3	0	1	0	10 (Note: Appearance(s) in the UEFA Europa League)	0	—		33	1
Rennes	Total		60	2	8	3	3	0	10	0	—		81	7
Norwich City	2012–13	Premier League	27	0	0	0	2	1	—		—		29	1
Norwich City	2013–14	Premier League	21	1	0	0	1	0	—		—		22	1
Norwich City	2014–15	Championship	36	2	0	0	0	0	—		3 (Note: Appearance(s) in the Championship play-offs)	0	39	2
Norwich City	2015–16	Premier League	23	2	0	0	0	0	—		—		23	2
Norwich City	2016–17	Championship	35	0	1	0	1	0	—		—		37	0
Norwich City	2017–18	Championship	23	0	2	0	2	0	—		—		27	0
Norwich City	2018–19	Championship	30	1	0	0	2	0	—		—		32	1
Norwich City	2019–20	Premier League	30	1	1	0	0	0	—		—		31	1
Norwich City	2020–21	Championship	19	0	2	0	1	0	—		—		22	0
Norwich City	Total		244	7	6	0	9	1	—		3	0	262	8
Rosenborg	2021	Eliteserien	6	0	0	0	—		6	0	—		12	0
Career total			404	23	27	6	12	1	43	0	3	0	489	30

=== International ===
Scores and results list Norway's goal tally first, score column indicates score after each Tettey goal.

List of international goals scored by Alexander Tettey
No.	Date	Venue	Opponent	Score	Result	Competition
1	28 March 2015	Stadion Maksimir, Zagreb, Croatia	Croatia	1–3	1–5	UEFA Euro 2016 qualifying
2	10 October 2015	Ullevaal Stadion, Oslo, Norway	Malta	1–0	2–0	UEFA Euro 2016 qualifying
3	13 October 2015	Stadio Olimpico, Rome, Italy	Italy	1–0	1–2	UEFA Euro 2016 qualifying

== Honours ==
Rosenborg

- Eliteserien: 2006, 2009

Norwich City

- EFL Championship: 2018–19, 2020–21
- Football League Championship play-offs: 2015
