= Wes Hoolahan =

Irish footballer (born 1982)

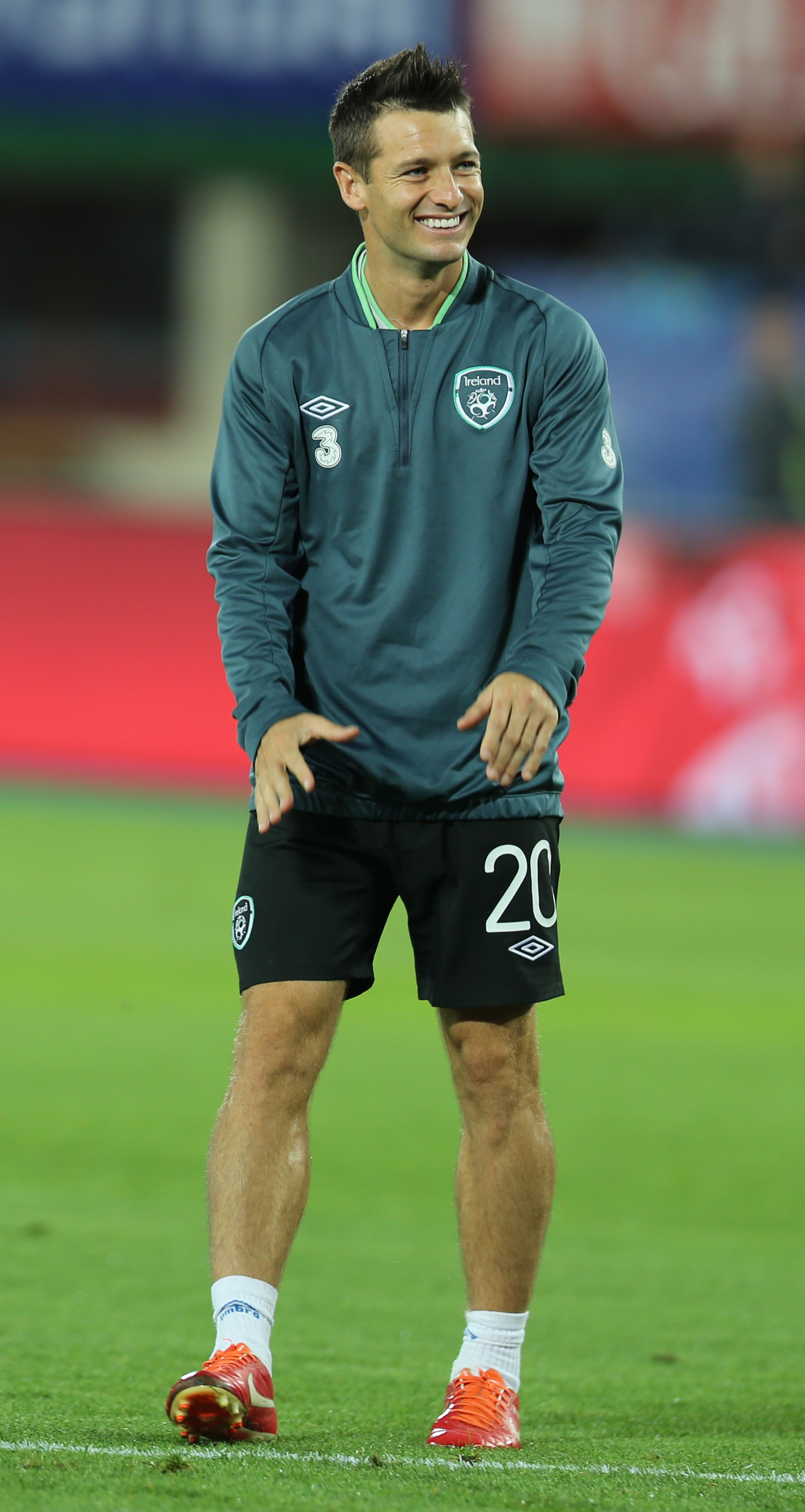
- Hoolahan with the Republic of Ireland in 2013

Personal information
- Full name: Wesley Patrick Hoolahan
- Date of birth: 20 May 1982 (age 44)
- Place of birth: Dublin, Ireland
- Height: 1.68 m (5 ft 6 in)
- Position: Attacking midfielder

Youth career
- Belvedere
- Shelbourne

Senior career*
Years	Team	Apps	(Gls)
2001–2005	Shelbourne	155	(12)
2005–2007	Livingston	16	(0)
2006–2007	→ Blackpool (loan)	42	(8)
2007–2008	Blackpool	45	(5)
2008–2018	Norwich City	323	(47)
2018–2019	West Bromwich Albion	6	(0)
2019–2020	Newcastle Jets	5	(0)
2020–2022	Cambridge United	58	(8)
2024	Doncaster City	1	(0)

International career
2002–2003	Republic of Ireland U21	9	(1)
2007	Republic of Ireland B	1	(0)
2008–2017	Republic of Ireland	43	(3)
- * Club domestic league appearances and goals as of 17 February 2024

Wesley Patrick Hoolahan (born 20 May 1982) is an Irish former professional footballer who played as an attacking midfielder.

Hoolahan began his playing career with Shelbourne and has previously played for Livingston, Blackpool, West Bromwich Albion, Newcastle Jets, and had a 10-year stay at Norwich City. He was the subject of a contested transfer between Livingston and Blackpool in 2007, eventually requiring mediation by FIFA before he was able to sign for Blackpool. Hoolahan played more than 350 games for Norwich, where he earned the nickname "the Irish Messi" or "Wessi".

Hoolahan made his Republic of Ireland senior debut in 2008 in a 1–0 win over Colombia. He represented Ireland at UEFA Euro 2016. Hoolahan won 43 caps in total and scored 3 goals.

== Club career ==
=== Early career ===
Hoolahan played as a schoolboy for Belvedere. He also played futsal with Belvedere. He started his senior career at Shelbourne where he won three League of Ireland Premier Division championships and excelled during their run in the 2004–05 UEFA Champions League qualifying rounds. He was the PFAI Young Player of the Year in the 2002–03 season. He then had a brief spell at Livingston.

=== Blackpool ===
On 21 July 2006, Hoolahan joined Blackpool on a season-long loan. He scored his first goal for the club on 30 September 2006, a penalty in a 3–0 win over Leyton Orient at Bloomfield Road. On 15 December 2006, he scored a goal and was sent off in a 3–1 win at Scunthorpe United.

In June 2007, Hoolahan signed a two-year contract with Blackpool. Livingston, however, refused to sign the documentation sanctioning the move, stating that Blackpool had repeatedly breached the terms of the loan agreement. Blackpool denied any such default and referred the matter to the Football Association. With Livingston being backed by the Scottish Football Association the matter was passed to FIFA for a decision to be made on the player's future. On 10 August 2007, FIFA ruled in Blackpool's favour, thus confirming Hoolahan as a Blackpool player.

=== Norwich City ===
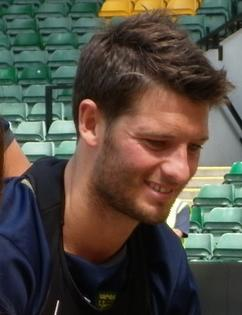
Hoolahan at Carrow Road, August 2011

On 26 June 2008, Norwich City confirmed the deal to bring Hoolahan on a three-year player-plus-cash deal. Norwich reserve team keeper Matt Gilks moved in the opposite direction along with an undisclosed amount of money. Hoolahan was handed squad number 14, which he retained in his time at Norwich. His first goal for the club finally came when he opened the scoring in a 4–0 win over Barnsley at Carrow Road on 17 January 2009. An injury sustained on 14 March, whilst playing against Plymouth Argyle, kept him out for the rest of the season as Norwich were ultimately relegated to League One.

In 2009–10, under new manager Paul Lambert, Hoolahan was utilised in a role behind the strikers in a midfield diamond formation as opposed to on the wing. This saw a higher personal goal return for Hoolahan as he scored 13 times (including four penalties) in all competitions before the new year.

In the 2010–11 season, Hoolahan scored his first two goals of the season against Leicester City, scoring a penalty and a 30-yard half-volley shot. Like the previous season, Hoolahan was utilised at the tip of the diamond formation. Hoolahan continued his good form, with a goal against Bristol City, making it three goals in two matches for him. On 28 December 2010, Hoolahan scored his first hat-trick for Norwich City in a 4–2 win over Sheffield United after coming on as a substitute.

Hoolahan signed a new three-and-a-half-year deal with the club in January 2011, committing his future to Norwich until 2014.

During pre-season before the 2011–12 Premier League campaign, Hoolahan was given the captain's armband when club captain Grant Holt and vice-captain Russell Martin were not playing. He led out the Canaries for the first time in the friendly fixture against Southend United at Roots Hall. He scored his first Premier League goal in Norwich City's opening day 1–1 draw against Wigan Athletic on 13 August 2011. Hoolahan led the Norwich team out as captain for their first Premier League win of the season, a 2–1 away victory against Bolton Wanderers on 17 September 2011, being given the armband ahead of the previous season's regular vice-captain Russell Martin who was also in the team. He was inducted into Norwich City's Hall of Fame on 20 March 2012.

On 15 December 2012, it was announced that Hoolahan had signed a new deal with Norwich City worth a reported £40,000 per week, keeping him at the club until 2015.

In January 2014, Hoolahan was the subject of transfer speculation from Aston Villa who reportedly had a bid of £1 million rejected. A few days after this reported bid, Hoolahan put in a transfer request which was turned down by the club. On 7 March, Hoolahan scored the opening goal against Villa in a 4–1 defeat, and executed a muted celebration.

In August 2014, Hoolahan signed a new contract to keep him at the club until the end of the 2016–17 season.

On 19 April 2015, Hoolahan was selected in the Football Manager Team of the Decade at the Football League Awards. Hoolahan made 32 appearances for Norwich in the 2015–16 season, scoring four goals, as the Canaries were relegated from the Premier League.

On 1 August 2016, Hoolahan agreed a new contract to keep him at Norwich City until 2018. He made his 300th Norwich appearance on 5 November 2016 in a 3–2 home defeat against Leeds United. On 7 May 2017, Hoolahan was announced as Norwich City's Player of the Season for 2016–17. In the last match of the season on 7 May 2017, Hoolahan scored two goals and registered an assist against Queens Park Rangers. He made 33 appearances in 2016–17, all of which came in the league, and scored seven goals.

On 23 April 2018, it was announced that Hoolahan would be leaving at the end of the season after being with the club for 10 years. Five days later, Hoolahan played in his last home match for Norwich City against Leeds United where he was given a guard of honour by both sets of players. As this was his last home appearance, he was rewarded with the captain's armband. Hoolahan scored his first league goal of the season and assisted the goal for Josh Murphy as Norwich won the match 2–1.

=== West Bromwich Albion ===
On 14 September 2018, Hoolahan signed for West Bromwich Albion on a short-term deal. Four days later, Hoolahan made his Albion debut in a 4–2 win against Bristol City as a 74th-minute substitute. Despite not starting a league game for Albion since joining in September, on 1 February 2019 Hoolahan's deal was extended until the end of the 2018–19 season. He was released by Albion at the end of the season.

=== Newcastle Jets ===
On 9 August 2019, Hoolahan signed a one-year deal with Newcastle Jets for the upcoming 2019–20 A-League season. However he suffered a serious ankle injury ahead of the season and consequently did not make his first appearance for them until a 1–1 draw at home to Melbourne Victory in February 2020. He would ultimately only make five appearances for the team.

=== Cambridge United ===
Hoolahan joined League Two club Cambridge United on 28 July 2020 on a one-year deal. Hoolahan was named the League Two Player of the Month for the month of January 2021 after registering two goals and two assists and helping Cambridge climb to first in the league table.

In April 2021, he was named on the EFL League Two Team of the Season and was nominated for the EFL League Two Player of the Season. The award was won by Hoolahan's team-mate Paul Mullin. On 2 June 2021, following promotion from League Two, Hoolahan signed a new one-year extension with the club, taking him through to the end of the 2021–22 season. On 3 May 2022, it was announced Hoolahan had been released by the club.

=== Doncaster City ===
On 17 February 2024, Hoolahan joined Doncaster City in the eleventh-tier Central Midlands Alliance Premier Division North.

== International career ==
Hoolahan was first capped at under-21 level for the Republic of Ireland. While at Shelbourne, he was an unused substitute in Don Givens' first game in charge of the Republic of Ireland, a 0–0 draw against Greece in November 2002.

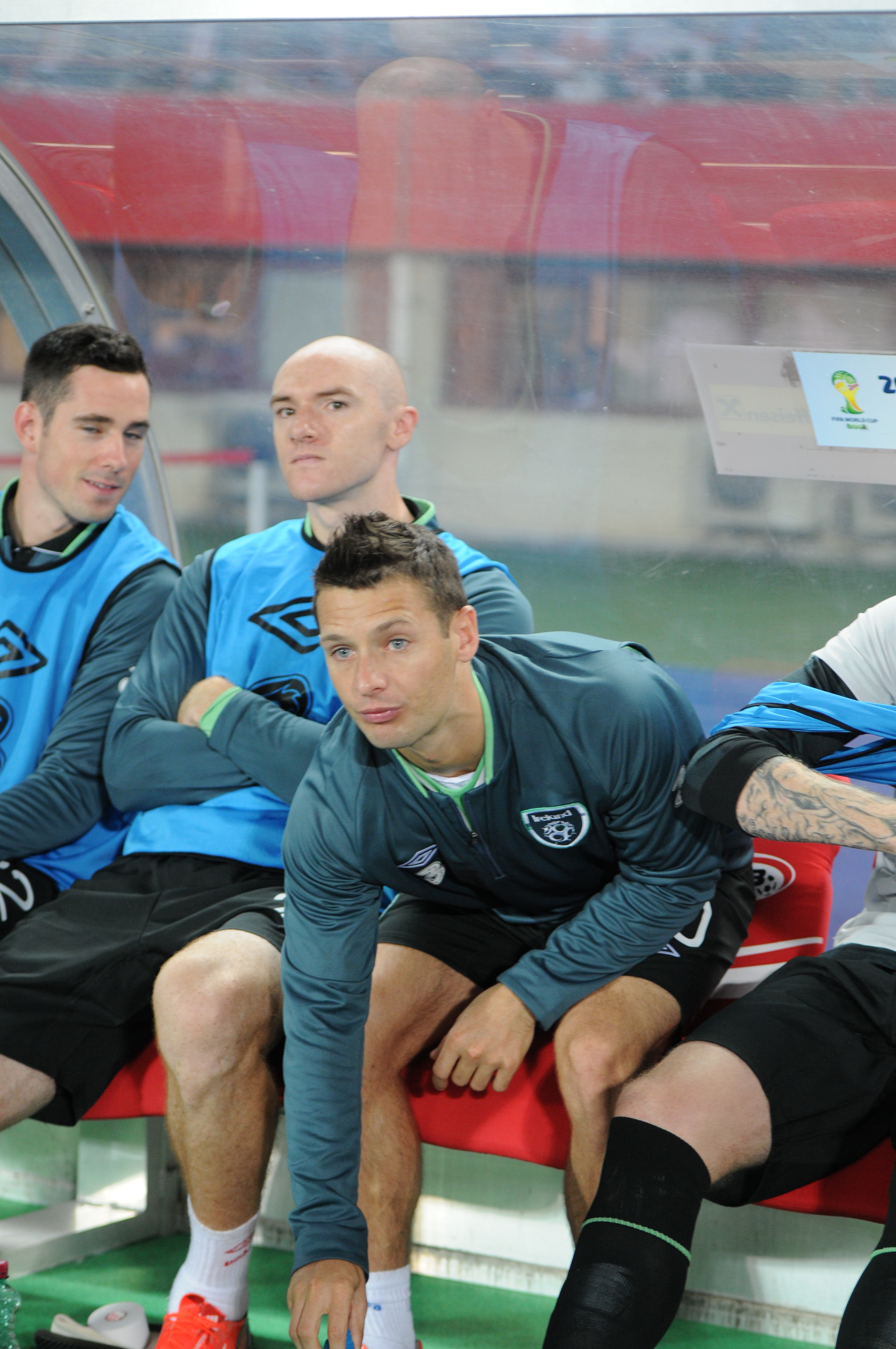
Hoolahan with Ireland, 2013

Hoolahan was named in the Republic of Ireland "B" squad on 8 November 2007, for the match against Scotland on 20 November at the Excelsior Stadium in Airdrie. Hoolahan played in the match, which ended in a 1–1 draw.

In April 2008, Giovanni Trapattoni included Hoolahan in his preliminary 40-man squad for the friendly matches against Serbia on 24 May and Colombia on 29 May. On 13 May, it was confirmed that Hoolahan had made the 28-man squad and that he would be joining a training camp in Portugal on 15 May in preparation for the matches. He came on as a 70th-minute substitute in a practice match which the Irish team drew 1–1 with Portuguese Liga de Honra club team Portimonense. He was an unused substitute in Ireland's 1–1 draw with Serbia at Croke Park in Dublin. On 29 May, he came on as a second-half substitute in the 1–0 win over Colombia held in England at Craven Cottage.

On 10 August 2012, Hoolahan was recalled to the Republic of Ireland squad for 15 August friendly international against Serbia in Belgrade. However, he was unable to accept the call due to an Achilles tendon injury.

On 31 October 2012, Hoolahan was called up to the Republic of Ireland squad for the 14 November friendly international against Greece in Dublin. He came on at half-time in the 1–0 defeat replacing Robbie Brady and earning his second cap for the Republic of Ireland. On 6 February 2013, Hoolahan scored his first goal for Ireland in a 2–0 defeat of Poland in a friendly in Dublin.

After being rarely used during the Trapattoni era, Hoolahan was selected for Martin O'Neill's first game as Irish manager against Latvia. Ireland won the game 3–0. Hoolahan flourished under O'Neill, picking up the Man of the Match awards against Serbia and Turkey. Former Norwich City teammate Anthony Pilkington called for O'Neill to build the team around Hoolahan for the Euro 2016 qualifiers.

On 11 October 2014, despite not being used in the first qualifying game against Georgia, O'Neill restored Hoolahan to the starting 11 against the minnows Gibraltar. Hoolahan was heavily involved in the game with his sublime ball finding Aiden McGeady who crossed to Robbie Keane who made it 1–0. He then assisted Keane for the second goal and won the penalty which Keane converted to make it 3–0. Hoolahan scored the 7th goal which rounded off the rout and he also picked up the Man of the Match award for his brilliant performance.

On 29 March 2015, Hoolahan started Ireland's crucial Euro 2016 qualifier against Poland in the Aviva Stadium. The game finished 1–1 with Hoolahan getting the assist for Shane Long's injury-time equaliser. Hoolahan picked up the Man of the Match award with Johnny Giles and Eamon Dunphy praising his performance.

Hoolahan scored the first goal for Ireland at UEFA Euro 2016 in Ireland's opening group stage match against Sweden. He earned the Man of the Match award for his display in an eventual 1–1 draw. On 22 June 2016, Hoolahan came on as a substitute for James McCarthy in the 77th minute in Ireland's final Euro 2016 group game against Italy. He provided the assist for Robbie Brady's 85th-minute winner to send the Republic of Ireland through to the last 16. Moments prior to the goal, Hoolahan had had a great one-on-one chance which was saved by the Italian goalkeeper Salvatore Sirigu. On 8 February 2018, Hoolahan announced his retirement from international football.

== Career statistics ==
=== Club ===
As of match played 8 August 2025

Appearances and goals by club, season and competition
Club	Season	League			National Cup		League Cup		Other		Total	
Club	Season	Division	Apps	Goals	Apps	Goals	Apps	Goals	Apps	Goals	Apps	Goals
Livingston	2005–06	Scottish Premier League	16	0	2	0	1	0	—		19	0
Blackpool	2006–07	League One	42	8	3	1	1	0	3 (Note: Appearances in League One play-offs)	1	49	10
Blackpool	2007–08	Championship	45	5	1	0	4	1	—		50	6
Blackpool	Total		87	13	4	1	5	1	3	1	99	16
Norwich City	2008–09	Championship	32	2	2	0	1	0	—		35	2
Norwich City	2009–10	League One	37	11	2	1	2	2	1 (Note: Appearance in Football League Trophy)	0	42	14
Norwich City	2010–11	Championship	41	10	1	0	2	0	—		44	10
Norwich City	2011–12	Premier League	33	4	3	1	1	0	—		37	5
Norwich City	2012–13	Premier League	33	3	1	0	2	1	—		36	4
Norwich City	2013–14	Premier League	16	1	0	0	3	0	—		19	1
Norwich City	2014–15	Championship	36	4	1	0	0	0	3 (Note: Appearances in Championship play-offs)	1	40	5
Norwich City	2015–16	Premier League	30	4	0	0	2	0	—		32	4
Norwich City	2016–17	Championship	33	7	0	0	0	0	—		33	7
Norwich City	2017–18	Championship	29	1	1	0	4	1	—		34	2
Norwich City	Total		320	47	11	2	17	4	4	1	352	54
West Bromwich Albion	2018–19	Championship	6	0	3	0	1	0	0	0	10	0
Newcastle Jets	2019–20	A-League	5	0	0	0	—		—		5	0
Cambridge United	2020–21	League Two	32	7	1	0	1	0	0	0	34	7
Cambridge United	2021–22	League One	26	1	3	0	0	0	1	0	30	1
Cambridge United	Total		58	8	4	0	1	0	1	0	64	8
Doncaster City	2023–24	Central Midlands Alliance Premier Division North	1	0	0	0	—		0	0	1	0
Career total			492	67	24	3	25	5	8	2	548	77

=== International ===
Appearances and goals by national team and year
National team	Year	Apps	Goals
Republic of Ireland	2008	1	0
Republic of Ireland	2012	1	0
Republic of Ireland	2013	8	1
Republic of Ireland	2014	8	1
Republic of Ireland	2015	8	0
Republic of Ireland	2016	11	1
Republic of Ireland	2017	6	0
Total		43	3

Scores and results list the Republic of Ireland's goal tally first, score column indicates score after each Hoolahan goal.

List of international goals scored by Wes Hoolahan
No.	Date	Venue	Cap	Opponent	Score	Result	Competition
1	6 February 2013	Aviva Stadium, Dublin, Ireland	3	Poland	2–0	2–0	Friendly
2	11 October 2014	Aviva Stadium, Dublin, Ireland	17	Gibraltar	7–0	7–0	UEFA Euro 2016 qualifying
3	13 June 2016	Stade de France, Saint-Denis, France	31	Sweden	1–0	1–1	UEFA Euro 2016

== Honours ==
Shelbourne

- League of Ireland Premier Division: 2001–02, 2003, 2004

Blackpool

- Football League One play-offs: 2007

Norwich City

- Football League Championship runner-up: 2010–11; play-offs: 2015
- Football League One: 2009–10

Cambridge United

- EFL League Two runner-up: 2020–21

Individual

- PFAI Young Player of the Year: 2002–03
- PFA Team of the Year: 2006–07 League One, 2009–10 League One, 2010–11 Championship, 2020–21 League Two
- The Football League Team of the Decade
- Norwich City Player of the Season: 2016–17
- League Two Player of the Month: January 2021
- EFL League Two Team of the Season: 2020–21
