= Simeon Jackson =

Canadian professional soccer player (born 1987)

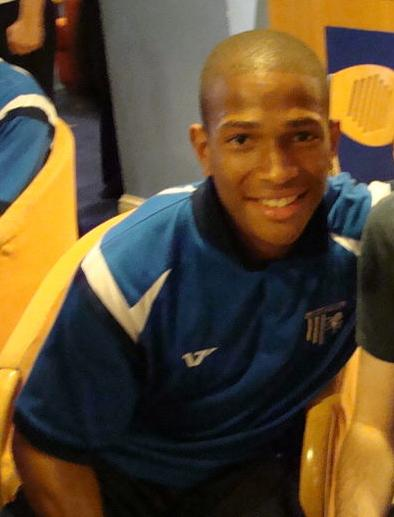
- Jackson in 2008

Personal information
- Full name: Simeon Alexander Jackson
- Date of birth: March 28, 1987 (age 39)
- Place of birth: Kingston, Jamaica
- Height: 1.72 m (5 ft 8 in)
- Position: Forward

Youth career
- Sunoco FC
- ASPIRE Academy
- Dulwich Hamlet

Senior career*
Years	Team	Apps	(Gls)
2004–2008	Rushden & Diamonds	90	(40)
2005	→ Raunds Town (loan)		
2008–2010	Gillingham	101	(35)
2010–2013	Norwich City (Note: Soccerbase's stats for the match between Doncaster Rovers and Norwich City on 14 September 2010 fail to include Jackson's substitute appearance for Norwich. Therefore, until and unless they correct it, he should have one more appearance for Norwich than given on his Soccerbase page.)	74	(17)
2013–2014	Eintracht Braunschweig	9	(0)
2014	Millwall	14	(2)
2014–2015	Coventry City	28	(3)
2015–2016	Barnsley	9	(0)
2016	Blackburn Rovers	17	(2)
2016–2018	Walsall	46	(7)
2018	→ Grimsby Town (loan)	5	(1)
2018–2019	St Mirren	30	(6)
2019	Kilmarnock	4	(0)
2020	Stevenage	4	(0)
2021–2023	Chelmsford City	68	(20)
2021	→ King's Lynn Town (loan)	17	(6)
2024	AFC Sudbury	13	(2)

International career^{‡}
2006–2008	Canada U20	7	(0)
2009–2017	Canada	49	(6)
- * Club domestic league appearances and goals as of 07:47, 18 October 2026 (UTC) ‡ National team caps and goals as of 16:02, October 10, 2021 (UTC)

Simeon Alexander Jackson (born March 28, 1987) is a retired Canadian soccer player who played as a forward.

He has spent the majority of his career playing in England, relocating from Mississauga, Ontario, to South London as a teenager to pursue his interest in football. Following a rejection by Gillingham after a trial, he played semi-professionally before making his name with Rushden & Diamonds of the Football Conference. His goalscoring feats for the club earned him a move to Gillingham, then of League Two, in 2008. He scored the winning goal for the club in the 2009 League Two Play-Off Final at Wembley Stadium.

In 2010 Jackson was transferred to Norwich City, then of the Championship, and scored the goal that clinched Norwich's promotion to the Premier League the following year. He fell out of favour at the club during the 2012–13 season, and opted to join German club Eintracht Braunschweig who were newly promoted to the Bundesliga. Desiring regular playing time, his contract with the German club was mutually terminated in January 2014 and he returned to England with Millwall.

After spells with Coventry City, Barnsley, Blackburn Rovers, Walsall and Grimsby Town, Jackson signed for Scottish club St Mirren in September 2018. He then joined another Scottish club, Kilmarnock, in October 2019.

Born in Jamaica, Jackson has played for the Canada national team since 2009. During qualification for the 2014 FIFA World Cup he scored a hat-trick against Saint Lucia.

== Club career ==
=== Early years ===
Jackson started his career with his local team in Canada, Sunoco FC. He was invited to have trials with Gillingham, but was rejected by the club. At the age of 15, he moved to England and lived with his grandmother in Croydon, South London. While playing for Dulwich Hamlet, Jackson worked at McDonald's to sustain his move to England.

=== Rushden & Diamonds ===
Jackson joined Rushden & Diamonds in 2004 and was the club's top scorer in the 2006–07 season, scoring 20 goals. The next season, he was top scorer for the Diamonds in the league, scoring 16 goals, despite leaving for Gillingham in January. He was joint eighth top scorer in the league that season.

In 2005, he had trials with Manchester United and Manchester City. Jackson went on a one-month loan to Raunds Town in December 2005. When he left the Diamonds he had established himself as the club's eighth highest goalscorer, scoring 43 goals in just over 100 games in all competitions.

=== Gillingham ===
In January 2008, Jackson signed with Gillingham, a club he had a trial with as a youth player, for a transfer fee of £150,000 on a three-and-a-half-year contract. He made his debut against Cheltenham Town on February 2, 2008.

On January 4, 2009, Jackson scored an equalizing goal for Gillingham in their 2–1 FA Cup third round defeat by Aston Villa. He scored both goals as Gillingham beat Rochdale in the 2008–09 play-off semi final, and the 90th-minute winner in the 1–0 win against Shrewsbury Town in the final, as Gillingham returned to League One one year after relegation.

=== Norwich City ===
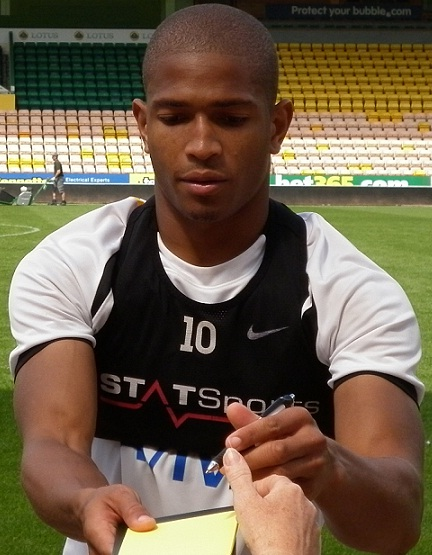
Jackson at Carrow Road in August 2012

Jackson signed for Norwich in July 2010, signing a two-year contract with the club, with the option for another year, in a deal which saw striker Cody McDonald move to Gillingham on loan. He was given the number 10 jersey upon his arrival at the club and made his debut in a 3–2 home loss to Watford on August 6, 2010. He scored his first goal for the club against Swansea City on August 21.

Manager Paul Lambert often used Jackson as an impact substitute due to the form and partnership of Grant Holt and Chris Martin. Jackson was given a start against Bristol City, and scored a brace, with a goal in each half at Ashton Gate. Jackson started the next four games again, in favour of Martin. He scored his fourth goal of the season in the 1–0 win over Middlesbrough on October 23. After a few months of mostly coming in as a substitute again, on April 2, 2011, Jackson scored his first hat-trick for Norwich, coming on as a substitute and scoring three times in the last twenty minutes of the match against Scunthorpe United at Carrow Road. He went on to score the goal that clinched Norwich's promotion to the Premier League, a late winner against Portsmouth.

Jackson made his Premier League debut on August 21, 2011, as a second-half substitute for Chris Martin in the second game of the season against Stoke City, the game finished with a Kenwyne Jones stoppage time header which resulted in a 1–1 home draw for Norwich.

Following his Premier League debut, Jackson began to struggle finding minutes in the team, he did not play a minute of football in the league until October 1 as a second half sub against Manchester United. Jackson made his first start in the Premier League on November 26 in a 2–1 victory over Queens Park Rangers, this was the first time a Canadian international had started in the Premier League since David Edgar on May 24, 2009, with Burnley. Jackson scored his first Premier League goal on December 20 against Wolverhampton Wanderers when he converted a Steve Morison cross one minute after being subbed on. Jackson came on as a second half sub against Fulham on December 31 and scored the game tying goal in second half injury time to earn a 1–1 home draw.

In the fourth round of the FA Cup in late January Norwich was drawn against West Bromwich Albion, Jackson came off the bench in the 65th minute with the game being tied at 1–1 and scored the winning goal in the 85th to take the Canaries into the fifth round. After failing to make an appearance for almost a month Jackson returned to the starting line up in a 3–3 away draw on 5 May against Arsenal. The following week, Jackson was given the start again in the final game of the season against Aston Villa, the game ended in a 2–0 home victory with Jackson and Grant Holt as the scorers.

Jackson finished the 2011–12 campaign for Norwich having made 22 appearances, starting in 10 of those. He scored three goals and registered two assists, with 34 shots on goal in his debut Premier League season. The club took up the option to extend Jackson's contract for another year in June 2012, along with David Fox and Elliott Ward. On August 25, 2012, he scored his first goal of the new season in a 1–1 draw at home to Queens Park Rangers. At the end of the season, Jackson was released by Norwich, having struggled to find minutes during his second year in the top flight.

=== Eintracht Braunschweig ===
On July 10, 2013, Jackson signed for German Bundesliga side Eintracht Braunschweig on a two-year contract. Jackson was previously linked with a move to Championship side AFC Bournemouth. After just nine appearances during the first half of the season, Jackson and Eintracht Braunschweig mutually agreed to terminate his contract on January 31, 2014.

=== Return to England ===
On February 1, 2014, a day after his Eintracht Braunschweig contract was terminated, Jackson agreed to join Championship side Millwall on a deal until the end of the season. He made his debut against Brighton & Hove Albion on March 1, 2014. Jackson scored his first goal on March 25 in a 3–2 home defeat to Birmingham City.

On August 18, 2014, Jackson signed for League One team Coventry City on a one-year contract. On September 13 Jackson scored his first goal for the club and the game-winning goal in a 2–1 victory over Yeovil Town. After leaving Coventry at the end of the 2014–15 season, Jackson went on trial at fellow League One side Barnsley. On September 3, 2015, he signed a short-term contract to keep him at the club until January 3, 2016. Following a successful trial, Jackson signed a short-term deal with Blackburn Rovers on January 15, 2016, to last until the end of the 2015–16 season. He scored his first goal for Blackburn in a 2–1 defeat to Leeds United on March 12, 2016.

Jackson signed for Walsall on July 18, 2016, and scored twice on his debut for Walsall in a 3–1 win over AFC Wimbledon on August 6, 2016. In January 2018 he joined Grimsby Town on loan for the remainder of the 2017–18 season. He was released by Walsall at the end of the 2017–18 season.

=== St Mirren ===
Jackson went on to a trial spell with Scottish Premiership club St Mirren in September 2018 and was signed on a short-term deal through January 2019. He left Saints when his contract expired in June 2019, having helped the club avoid relegation.

=== Kilmarnock ===
Jackson signed a short-term contract with Scottish Premiership club Kilmarnock in October 2019. Jackson left after the expiration of his contract in December 2019.

=== Stevenage ===
On January 20, 2020, Jackson signed a six-month deal for Stevenage. After only five appearances in all competitions Jackson was released by the club at the conclusion of the 2019–20 season.

=== Chelmsford City ===
On February 5, 2021, Jackson signed for National League South club Chelmsford City. On March 5, 2021, Jackson signed for National League club King's Lynn Town on loan until the end of the 2020–21 season. On July 3, 2021, Chelmsford confirmed Jackson would be returning to the club for the 2021–22 season, taking up a head of coaching role and a community ambassador role alongside his playing responsibilities. On July 10, 2023, Chelmsford announced Jackson's retirement from playing.

=== AFC Sudbury ===
On March 27, 2024, Jackson came out of retirement to sign for AFC Sudbury.

== International career ==
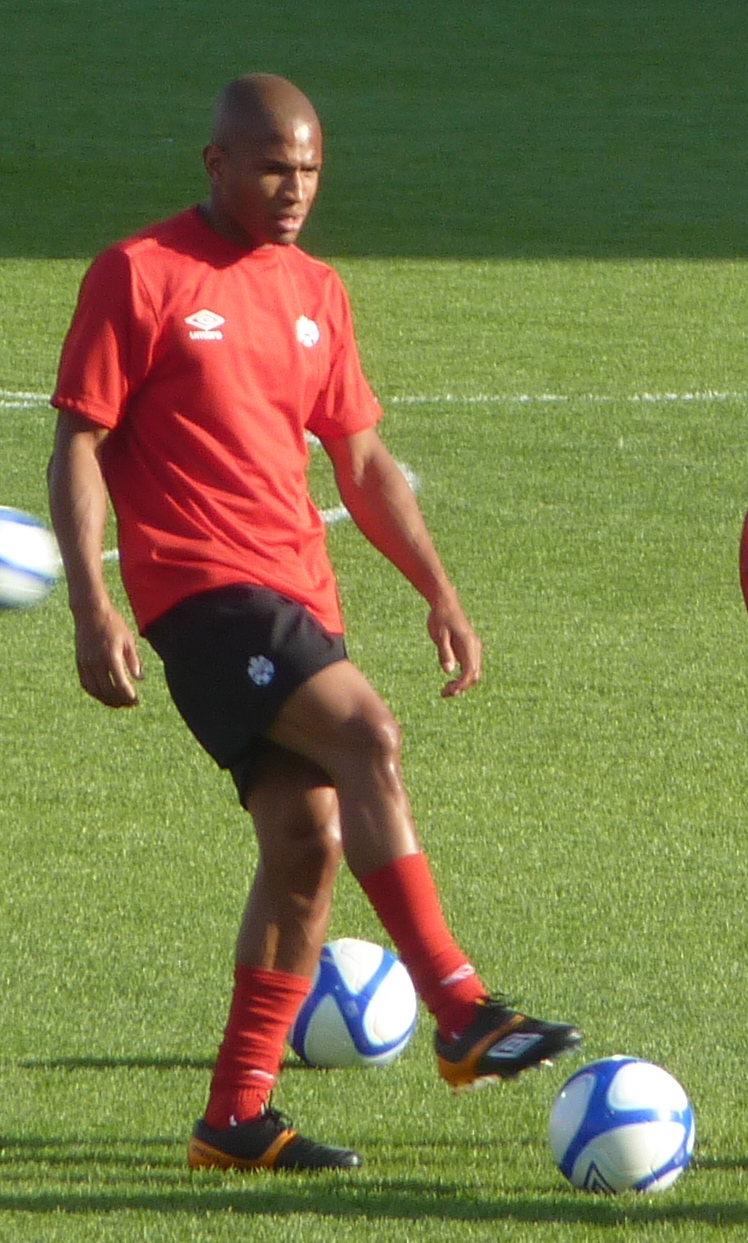
Jackson warming up before a match against Ecuador at BMO Field in June 2011

Jackson qualified for Canadian citizenship by virtue of his years of residence there as a child, and earned 49 caps for Canada, scoring six times. He also has seven caps for the Canadian men's youth (under-20) team. His first game was a friendly against Brazil in May 2006, and he played in all three of Canada's games at the 2007 U-20 World Cup, his last games at that level. On November 14, 2008, he received his first call up for the Canadian senior squad for a match against his country of birth, Jamaica.

On May 30, 2009, Jackson made his debut for Canada against Cyprus, scoring the winning goal in the 53rd minute of a 1–0 victory. Jackson helped Canada reach the quarter-final stage of the 2009 CONCACAF Gold Cup in the US, playing in all four of Canada's games in the tournament. On December 18, 2009, Jackson was named the Canadian Player of the Year.

National team coach Stephen Hart decided in the friendly versus Peru to experiment by using Jackson as a right winger. With a solid performance at BMO Field Hart continued to use Jackson out wide for future Canada match ups. On October 8, 2010, Jackson scored his second international goal with a chip in a friendly against Ukraine. On October 7, 2011, Jackson scored a hat-trick against Saint Lucia in a game that finished in a 7–0 away victory for Canada. Jackson became only the second ever Canadian to score a hat-trick in World Cup qualifying joining the former striker Alex Bunbury. In early December, Jackson was shortlisted for the 2011 Canadian Player of the Year along with Dwayne De Rosario and Josh Simpson, it was announced on December 14 that he had finished in second place losing out to De Rosario.

In the summer of 2013, Jackson was selected for his third consecutive Gold Cup, but after playing in the first group stage game against Martinique he left with the team's blessing to join his new German club and was replaced by Kyle Porter for the remainder of the tournament.

== Coaching career ==
In November 2024, following his coaching career, Jackson returned to Norwich City, as a member of the academy staff.

== Personal life ==
Jackson was born in Kingston, Jamaica. At the age of three, he moved with his parents to Mississauga, Ontario.

=== Commercial interests ===
On June 1, 2011, it was announced by Umbro that Jackson had signed an endorsement deal following the new partnership between the English sportswear company and the Canadian Soccer Association, making Jackson one of the few Canadian players to have an endorsement deal.

In 2012, Jackson revealed that "he plans to fulfil a long-held dream next year when he sets up his first 'soccer' school in Southern Ontario ... "I want to help kids in Canada improve themselves, and get the opportunity to play in Europe and at the highest level through a soccer school."

== Career statistics ==
=== Club ===
As of May 8, 2022

Appearances and goals by club, season and competition
Club	Season	League			National cup		League cup		Other		Total	
Club	Season	Division	Apps	Goals	Apps	Goals	Apps	Goals	Apps	Goals	Apps	Goals
Rushden & Diamonds	2004–05	League Two	3	0	0	0	0	0	1 (Note: Appearance(s) in Northamptonshire Cup)	0	4	0
Rushden & Diamonds	2005–06	League Two	14	5	0	0	0	0	2	0	16	5
Rushden & Diamonds	2006–07	Conference Premier	45	19	2	1	―		3 (Note: Appearance(s) in FA Trophy)	0	50	20
Rushden & Diamonds	2007–08	Conference Premier	28	16	3	2	―		3 (Note: Two appearances in FA Trophy; one appearance in Northamptonshire Cup)	0	34	18
Rushden & Diamonds	Total		90	40	5	3	0	0	9	0	104	43
Gillingham	2007–08	League One	18	4	―		―		―		18	4
Gillingham	2008–09	League Two	41	17	3	1	1	0	4 (Note: Three appearances three goals in League Two play-offs; one appearance in Football League Trophy)	3	49	21
Gillingham	2009–10	League One	42	14	3	0	2	2	1 (Note: Appearance(s) in Football League Trophy)	1	48	17
Gillingham	Total		101	35	6	1	3	2	5	4	115	42
Norwich City	2010–11	Championship	39	13	1	0	1	0	―		41	13
Norwich City	2011–12	Premier League	22	3	3	2	1	0	―		26	5
Norwich City	2012–13	Premier League	13	1	2	1	4	1	―		19	3
Norwich City	Total		74	17	6	3	6	1	0	0	86	21
Eintracht Braunschweig	2013–14	Bundesliga	9	0	1	0	―		―		10	0
Millwall	2013–14	Championship	14	2	0	0	0	0	―		14	2
Coventry City	2014–15	League One	28	3	1	0	0	0	1	0	30	3
Barnsley	2015–16	League One	9	0	0	0	0	0	1	0	10	0
Blackburn Rovers	2015–16	Championship	17	2	2	0	―		―		19	2
Walsall	2016–17	League One	38	7	1	0	1	0	1	0	41	7
Walsall	2017–18 (Note: Soccerbase also have Jackson making a substitute appearance in the Football League Trophy against Shrewsbury Town on 7 November 2017. However, Soccerbase have four substitutes appearing for Walsall in this game, which was against regulations at the time. Other sources have Jackson as an unused substitute.)	League Two	8	0	0	0	1	0	0	0	9	0
Walsall	Total		46	7	1	0	2	0	1	0	50	7
Grimsby Town (loan)	2017–18	League Two	5	1	―		―		―		5	1
St Mirren	2018–19	Scottish Premiership	30	6	2	0	0	0	0	0	32	6
Kilmarnock	2019–20	Scottish Premiership	4	0	―		―		―		4	0
Stevenage	2019–20	League Two	4	0	―		―		1	0	5	0
Chelmsford City	2020–21	National League South	2	1	—		—		—		2	1
Chelmsford City	2021–22	National League South	28	11	1	0	—		1	0	30	11
Chelmsford City	Total		30	12	1	0	0	0	1	0	32	12
King's Lynn Town (loan)	2020–21	National League	17	6	—		—		—		17	6
Career totals			478	131	25	7	11	3	19	4	533	145

=== International ===
As of March 22, 2017

Appearances and goals by national team and year
National team	Year	Apps	Goals
Canada	2009	8	1
Canada	2010	5	1
Canada	2011	12	4
Canada	2012	8	0
Canada	2013	6	0
Canada	2014	3	0
Canada	2015	3	0
Canada	2016	3	0
Canada	2017	1	0
Total		49	6

Scores and results list Canada's goal tally first, score column indicates score after each Jackson goal.

List of international goals scored by Simeon Jackson
No.	Date	Venue	Opponent	Score	Result	Competition
1	May 30, 2009	Antonis Papadopoulos Stadium, Larnaca, Cyprus	Cyprus	1–0	1–0	Friendly
2	October 8, 2010	Lobanovskyi Dynamo Stadium, Kyiv, Ukraine	Ukraine	1–0	2–2	Friendly
3	September 6, 2011	Juan Ramón Loubriel Stadium, Bayamón, Puerto Rico	Puerto Rico	2–0	3–0	2014 FIFA World Cup qualification
4	October 7, 2011	Beausejour Stadium, Gros Islet, Saint Lucia	Saint Lucia	1–0	7–0	2014 FIFA World Cup qualification
5	October 7, 2011	Beausejour Stadium, Gros Islet, Saint Lucia	Saint Lucia	2–0	7–0	2014 FIFA World Cup qualification
6	October 7, 2011	Beausejour Stadium, Gros Islet, Saint Lucia	Saint Lucia	4–0	7–0	2014 FIFA World Cup qualification

== Honours ==
Gillingham

- Football League Two play-offs: 2009

Individual

- Canadian Player of the Year: 2009
- Canada Soccer Player of the Month: January 2012
- Championship Player of the Month: April 2011
