= 2010–11 Norwich City F.C. season =

Norwich City
2010–11 season
- Chairman: Alan Bowkett
- Manager: Paul Lambert
- Stadium: Carrow Road
- Championship: 2nd – promoted to the Premier League
- FA Cup: Third round
- League Cup: Second round
- Top goalscorer: League: Grant Holt (21); All: Grant Holt (23)
- Highest home attendance: 26,532 (vs. Ipswich Town, 28 November 2010)
- Lowest home attendance: 23,852 (vs. Swansea City, 21 August 2010)
- Average home league attendance: 25,386
| Home colours | Away colours |

The 2010–11 season was the 109th season in the history of Norwich City. It was the club's first season back in the Football League Championship (second tier of the English football pyramid), following promotion from League One in 2009–10. Norwich finished as runners-up to Queens Park Rangers, confirming promotion to the Premier League in the penultimate match of the season with a 1–0 victory against Portsmouth at Fratton Park. Thus they became the first side since Manchester City in the 1999–2000 season to win successive promotions to the top flight. This article shows statistics and details of all matches played by the club during the season.

== Board and staff members ==
=== Board members ===
| Position | Staff |
|---|---|
| Chairman | (England) Alan Bowkett |
| Joint Majority Shareholder | (England) Delia Smith |
| Joint Majority Shareholder | (Wales) Michael Wynn-Jones |
| Director | (England) Stephen Fry |
| Director | (England) Michael Foulger |
| Director | (England) Stephan Phillips |
| Chief Executive | (Scotland) David McNally |

Last updated: 13 July 2010
Source: Norwich FC

=== Coaching staff ===
| Position | Staff |
|---|---|
| Manager | (Scotland) Paul Lambert |
| Assistant manager | (England) Ian Culverhouse |
| First Team coach Reserve Team manager | Vacant |
| Head of Football Operations | (England) Gary Karsa |
| Goalkeeping Coach | (England) Laurence Batty |
| Head of Strength and Conditioning | (England) Mike Watts |
| Academy Manager | (England) Ricky Martin |
| Assistant Academy Manager | (Scotland) Gary Holt |
| Under 14s coach | (England) Neil Adams |
| Performance Analyst | (England) Gareth Payne |
| Head of Physiotherapy | (England) Neal Reynolds |
| Physiotherapist | (England) Stuart Wardle |
| Club Doctor | (England) Dr Nick Wilford |
| Chief Scout | (Scotland) Ewan Chester |

Last updated: 19 July 2010
Source: Norwich FC

== Statistics ==
=== Appearances, goals and cards ===
Last updated on 7 May 2011.
(Substitute appearances in brackets)

| No. | Pos. | Name | League | | FA Cup | | League Cup | | Total | | Discipline | |
| No. | Pos. | Name | Apps | Goals | Apps | Goals | Apps | Goals | Apps | Goals | Yellow card | Red card |
|---|---|---|---|---|---|---|---|---|---|---|---|---|
| 1 | GK | (England) John Ruddy | 45 | 0 | 0 | 0 | 1 | 0 | 46 | 0 | 2 | 0 |
| 2 | DF | (England) Russell Martin | 46 | 5 | 1 | 0 | 2 | 0 | 49 | 5 | 5 | 0 |
| 3 | DF | (England) Adam Drury | 19 (1) | 1 | 1 | 0 | 1 | 0 | 21 (1) | 1 | 3 | 0 |
| 4 | MF | (England) Matthew Gill | 0 (4) | 0 | 0 | 0 | 1 (1) | 0 | 1 (5) | 0 | 0 | 0 |
| 5 | DF | (England) Michael Nelson | 7 (1) | 2 | 0 | 0 | 1 | 0 | 8 (1) | 2 | 1 | 0 |
| 5* | DF | (Wales) Rob Edwards | 0 (3) | 0 | 0 | 0 | 0 | 0 | 0 (3) | 0 | 0 | 0 |
| 6 | DF | (United States) Zak Whitbread | 20 (2) | 1 | 1 | 0 | 0 | 0 | 21 (2) | 1 | 1 | 0 |
| 7 | MF | (Wales) Andrew Crofts | 44 | 8 | 0 | 0 | 0 | 0 | 44 | 8 | 7 | 1 |
| 8 | MF | (Scotland) Stephen Hughes | 0 (1) | 0 | 0 | 0 | 0 (1) | 0 | 0 (2) | 0 | 0 | 0 |
| 9 | FW | (England) Grant Holt | 44 (1) | 21 | 0 (1) | 0 | 2 | 2 | 46 (2) | 23 | 7 | 1 |
| 10 | FW | (Canada) Simeon Jackson | 20 (19) | 13 | 0 (1) | 0 | 1 | 0 | 21 (20) | 13 | 3 | 0 |
| 11 | MF | (England) Andrew Surman | 18 (3) | 3 | 0 | 0 | 0 | 0 | 18 (3) | 3 | 1 | 0 |
| 12 | MF | (England) Henri Lansbury | 15 (8) | 4 | 0 | 0 | 0 | 0 | 15 (8) | 4 | 7 | 0 |
| 13 | GK | (England) Declan Rudd | 1 | 0 | 1 | 0 | 1 | 0 | 3 | 0 | 0 | 0 |
| 14 | MF | (Republic of Ireland) Wes Hoolahan | 36 (5) | 10 | 1 | 0 | 2 | 0 | 39 (5) | 10 | 2 | 0 |
| 15 | MF | (England) David Fox | 30 (2) | 1 | 1 | 0 | 2 | 0 | 33 (2) | 1 | 5 | 0 |
| 16 | FW | (England) Chris Martin | 21 (9) | 4 | 1 | 0 | 1 | 2 | 23 (9) | 6 | 3 | 0 |
| 17 | MF | (England) Tom Adeyemi | 0 | 0 | 0 | 0 | 0 | 0 | 0 | 0 | 0 | 0 |
| 18 | MF | (England) Korey Smith | 19 (9) | 0 | 1 | 0 | 1 | 0 | 21 (9) | 0 | 0 | 0 |
| 19 | MF | (Scotland) Simon Lappin | 20 (7) | 0 | 0 (1) | 0 | 2 | 0 | 22 (8) | 0 | 6 | 0 |
| 20 | DF | (England) Leon Barnett | 25 | 1 | 1 | 0 | 0 | 0 | 26 | 1 | 4 | 1 |
| 21 | FW | (England) Aaron Wilbraham | 6 (6) | 1 | 1 | 0 | 0 | 0 | 7 (6) | 1 | 2 | 0 |
| 22 | DF | (England) Elliott Ward | 39 | 1 | 0 | 0 | 2 | 0 | 41 | 1 | 10 | 0 |
| 23 | FW | (England) Oli Johnson | 0 (4) | 0 | 0 | 0 | 0 (2) | 0 | 0 (6) | 0 | 0 | 0 |
| 24 | MF | (England) Anthony McNamee | 5 (12) | 0 | 1 | 0 | 0 (2) | 0 | 6 (14) | 0 | 0 | 0 |
| 25 | FW | (England) Luke Daley | 0 (1) | 0 | 0 | 0 | 0 | 0 | 0 (1) | 0 | 0 | 0 |
| 26 | DF | (Scotland) Steven Smith | 5 (2) | 0 | 0 | 0 | 0 | 0 | 5 (2) | 0 | 1 | 0 |
| 28 | DF | (England) George Francomb | 0 | 0 | 0 | 0 | 1 | 0 | 1 | 0 | 0 | 0 |
| 29 | MF | (Wales) Josh Dawkin | 0 | 0 | 0 | 0 | 0 | 0 | 0 | 0 | 0 | 0 |
| 30 | MF | (Wales) Owain Tudur Jones | 1 (1) | 0 | 0 | 0 | 0 | 0 | 1 (1) | 0 | 0 | 0 |
| 31 | GK | (England) Jed Steer | 0 | 0 | 0 | 0 | 0 | 0 | 0 | 0 | 0 | 0 |
| 32 | DF | (England) Marc Tierney | 14 (2) | 0 | 0 | 0 | 0 | 0 | 14 (2) | 0 | 3 | 0 |
| 33 | DF | (Denmark) Jens Berthel Askou | 2 (3) | 0 | 0 | 0 | 1 | 1 | 3 (3) | 1 | 0 | 0 |
| 35 | FW | (Wales) Sam Vokes | 1 (3) | 1 | 0 | 0 | 0 | 0 | 1 (3) | 1 | 0 | 0 |
| 36 | DF | (England) Sam Habergham | 0 | 0 | 0 | 0 | 0 | 0 | 0 | 0 | 0 | 0 |
| 37 | FW | (Spain) Daniel Pacheco | 3 (3) | 2 | 0 | 0 | 0 | 0 | 3 (3) | 2 | 0 | 0 |

=== Captains ===
Accounts for all competitions. Last updated on 7 May 2011.

| No. | Pos. | Name | Starts |
|---|---|---|---|
| 9 | FW | (England) Grant Holt | 45 |
| 5 | DF | (England) Michael Nelson | 2 |
| 7 | MF | (Wales) Andrew Crofts | 1 |
| 2 | DF | (England) Russell Martin | 1 |

=== Top goalscorers ===
Lists at most top 10 goalscorers only. Players are ranked by the total number of goals scored. At the end of the season, players with one goal only and are in the top 10 should be classified according to most recently scored – the top 3 of these few will remain in the list.
Legend: LG = Championship; L. Cup = League Cup
Classification: 1. Goals in total 2. Goals in league 3. Goals in FA Cup 4. Goals in League Cup 5. Most recently scored

| Rank | # | Pos. | Player | LG | FA Cup | L. Cup | Total | Last scored against |
| 1 | 9 | FW | (England) Grant Holt | 21 | 0 | 2 | 23 | (England) Coventry City (Championship) |
| 2 | 10 | FW | (Canada) Simeon Jackson | 13 | 0 | 0 | 13 | (England) Portsmouth (Championship) |
| 3 | 14 | MF | (Republic of Ireland) Wes Hoolahan | 10 | 0 | 0 | 10 | (England) Leicester City (Championship) |
| 4 | 7 | MF | (Wales) Andrew Crofts | 8 | 0 | 0 | 8 | (England) Barnsley (Championship) |
| 5 | 16 | FW | (England) Chris Martin | 4 | 0 | 2 | 6 | (England) Derby County (Championship) |
| 6 | 2 | DF | (England) Russell Martin | 5 | 0 | 0 | 5 | (England) Ipswich Town (Championship) |
| 7 | 12 | MF | (England) Henri Lansbury | 4 | 0 | 0 | 4 | (England) Bristol City (Championship) |
| 8 | 11 | MF | (England) Andrew Surman | 3 | 0 | 0 | 3 | (England) Ipswich Town (Championship) |
| 9 | 37 | FW | (Spain) Daniel Pacheco | 2 | 0 | 0 | 2 | (England) Coventry City (Championship) |
| 9 | 5 | DF | (England) Michael Nelson | 2 | 0 | 0 | 2 | (England) Sheffield United (Championship) |

=== Penalties Awarded ===
| Date | Success? | Penalty Taker | Opponent | Competition |
|---|---|---|---|---|
| 28 September | ✓ | (Republic of Ireland) Wes Hoolahan | Leicester City | Championship |
| 2 October | ✓ | (Republic of Ireland) Wes Hoolahan | Bristol City | Championship |
| 16 October | ✗ | (Republic of Ireland) Wes Hoolahan | Queens Park Rangers | Championship |
| 28 December | ✓ | (Republic of Ireland) Wes Hoolahan | Sheffield United | Championship |
| 28 December | ✓ | (Republic of Ireland) Wes Hoolahan | Sheffield United | Championship |
| 5 March | ✗ | (Republic of Ireland) Wes Hoolahan | Preston North End | Championship |
| 8 March | ✓ | (England) Grant Holt | Leicester City | Championship |
| 14 March | ✓ | (England) Grant Holt | Bristol City | Championship |
| 2 April | ✓ | (England) Grant Holt | Scunthorpe United | Championship |

== Players ==
Updated 7 May 2011.

=== First team squad ===
Note: Flags indicate national team as defined under FIFA eligibility rules; some limited exceptions apply. Players may hold more than one non-FIFA nationality.

| No. | Pos. | Nation | Player |
|---|---|---|---|
| 1 | GK | ENG | John Ruddy |
| 2 | DF | ENG | Russell Martin |
| 3 | DF | ENG | Adam Drury |
| 4 | MF | ENG | Matthew Gill |
| 6 | DF | USA | Zak Whitbread |
| 7 | MF | WAL | Andrew Crofts |
| 8 | MF | SCO | Stephen Hughes |
| 9 | FW | ENG | Grant Holt (captain) |
| 10 | FW | CAN | Simeon Jackson |
| 11 | MF | ENG | Andrew Surman |
| 12 | MF | ENG | Henri Lansbury (on loan from Arsenal) |
| 13 | GK | ENG | Declan Rudd |
| 14 | MF | IRL | Wes Hoolahan |
| 15 | MF | ENG | David Fox |
| 16 | FW | ENG | Chris Martin |
| 18 | MF | ENG | Korey Smith |

| No. | Pos. | Nation | Player |
|---|---|---|---|
| 19 | MF | SCO | Simon Lappin |
| 20 | DF | ENG | Leon Barnett |
| 21 | FW | ENG | Aaron Wilbraham |
| 22 | DF | ENG | Elliott Ward |
| 23 | FW | ENG | Oli Johnson |
| 24 | MF | ENG | Anthony McNamee |
| 25 | FW | ENG | Luke Daley |
| 28 | DF | ENG | George Francomb |
| 31 | GK | ENG | Jed Steer |
| 32 | DF | ENG | Marc Tierney |
| 33 | DF | DEN | Jens Berthel Askou |
| 34 | MF | NIR | Matt Ball |
| 36 | DF | ENG | Sam Habergham |
| 37 | FW | ESP | Daniel Pacheco (on loan from Liverpool) |
| 38 | MF | WAL | Josh Dawkin |

=== Out on loan ===
Note: Flags indicate national team as defined under FIFA eligibility rules; some limited exceptions apply. Players may hold more than one non-FIFA nationality.

| No. | Pos. | Nation | Player |
|---|---|---|---|
| 17 | MF | ENG | Tom Adeyemi (on loan at Bradford City until 8 May 2011) |
| 26 | DF | SCO | Steven Smith (on loan at Aberdeen until 8 May 2011) |

| No. | Pos. | Nation | Player |
|---|---|---|---|
| 27 | FW | ENG | Cody McDonald (on loan at Gillingham until 8 May 2011) |
| 30 | MF | WAL | Owain Tudur Jones (on loan at Brentford until 31 May 2011) |

== Transfers ==
=== In ===
| Date | # | Pos. | Name | From | Fee |
|---|---|---|---|---|---|
| 21 May 2010 | 7 | MF | Andrew Crofts | Brighton & Hove Albion | £300,000 |
| 4 June 2010 | 15 | MF | David Fox | Colchester United | Undisclosed |
| 22 June 2010 | 11 | MF | Andrew Surman | Wolverhampton | Undisclosed |
| 1 July 2010 | 22 | DF | Elliott Ward | Coventry City | Free |
| 1 July 2010 | 26 | DF | Steven Smith | Rangers | Free |
| 5 July 2010 | 1 | GK | John Ruddy | Everton | Undisclosed |
| 15 July 2010 | 10 | FW | Simeon Jackson | Gillingham | Undisclosed |
| 1 January 2011 | 20 | DF | Leon Barnett | West Bromwich Albion | Undisclosed |
| 1 January 2011 | 21 | FW | Aaron Wilbraham | Milton Keynes Dons | Undisclosed |
| 13 January 2011 | 32 | DF | Marc Tierney | Colchester United | Undisclosed |

=== Out ===
| Date | # | Pos. | Name | To | Fee |
|---|---|---|---|---|---|
| 14 May 2010 | 36 | MF | Damon Lathrope | Torquay United | Released |
| 14 May 2010 | 29 | FW | Danny Kelly | Barnet | Released |
| 14 May 2010 | 10 | FW | Jamie Cureton | Exeter City | Released |
| 14 May 2010 | 12 | DF | Gary Doherty | Charlton Athletic | Released |
| 14 May 2010 | 18 | FW | Paul McVeigh | Unattached | Released |
| 1 July 2010 | 20 | MF | Darel Russell | Preston | Released |
| 2 July 2010 | 15 | DF | Michael Spillane | Brentford | Undisclosed |
| 5 July 2010 | 35 | DF | David Stephens | Hibernian | Undisclosed |
| 31 January 2011 | 5 | DF | Michael Nelson | Scunthorpe United | Undisclosed |

=== Loans in ===
| Date | Pos. | Name | From | Expiry |
|---|---|---|---|---|
| 26 August 2010 | DF | Leon Barnett | West Bromwich Albion | Jan 2011 |
| 22 November 2010 | MF | Henri Lansbury | Arsenal | Jan 2011 |
| 1 January 2011 | FW | Aaron Wilbraham | Milton Keynes Dons | Jan 2011 |
| 27 January 2011 | MF | Henri Lansbury | Arsenal | May 2011 |
| 21 February 2011 | DF | Rob Edwards | Blackpool | May 2011 |
| 24 March 2011 | FW | Daniel Pacheco | Liverpool | May 2011 |
| 24 March 2011 | FW | Sam Vokes | Wolverhampton | May 2011 |

=== Loans out ===
| Date | Pos. | Name | To | Until |
|---|---|---|---|---|
| 14 July 2010 | MF | Tom Adeyemi | Bradford City | Jan 2011 |
| 15 July 2010 | FW | Cody McDonald | Gillingham | May 2011 |
| 27 August 2010 | MF | Owain Tudur Jones | Yeovil Town | Dec 2010 |
| 22 September 2010 | MF | Matthew Gill | Peterborough United | Sep 2010 |
| 7 October 2010 | DF | George Francomb | Barnet | Dec 2010 |
| 14 January 2011 | FW | Oli Johnson | Yeovil Town | Apr 2011 |
| 19 January 2011 | DF | Jens Berthel Askou | Millwall | Feb 2011 |
| 21 January 2011 | FW | Luke Daley | Stevenage | Feb 2011 |
| 21 January 2011 | MF | Owain Tudur Jones | Brentford | Feb 2011 |
| 21 January 2011 | MF | Matthew Gill | Walsall | Feb 2011 |
| 10 February 2011 | MF | Stephen Hughes | Milton Keynes Dons | Mar 2011 |

== Competitions ==
Win Draw Loss

=== Pre-season ===
Note: this section relates to first team friendlies only.

| Match | 1 | 2 | 3 | 4 | 5 | 6 |
|---|---|---|---|---|---|---|
| Result | 3–0 | 0–0 | 0–1 | 2–1 | 0–0 | 2–4 |

| 10 July 2010 | Dereham Town | 0–3 | Norwich City | Dereham, Norfolk |
| 15:00 BST | | Report | Nelson 25'; McDonald 68', 70' | Stadium: Aldiss Park; Attendance: 2,150; Referee: Unknown |

| 20 July 2010 | Stevenage | 0–0 | Norwich City | Stevenage, Hertfordshire |
| 19:45 BST | | Report | | Stadium: Broadhall Way; Attendance: Unknown; Referee: Andy Woolmer |

| 22 July 2010 | Dagenham & Redbridge | 1–0 | Norwich City | Dagenham, London |
| 19:30 BST | Tomlin 25' | Report | | Stadium: Victoria Road; Attendance: 1,092; Referee: Gavin Ward |

| 24 July 2010 | Norwich City | 2–1 | Newcastle United | Norwich, Norfolk |
| 15:00 BST | C. Martin 39', 76' | Report | Ameobi 47' | Stadium: Carrow Road; Attendance: 13,195; Referee: Fred Graham |

| 28 July 2010 | Lincoln City | 0–0 | Norwich City | Lincoln, Lincolnshire |
| 19:30 BST | | Report | | Stadium: Sincil Bank; Attendance: 1,727; Referee: Jock Waugh |

| 31 July 2010 | Norwich City | 2–4 | Everton | Norwich, Norfolk |
| 15:00 BST | Crofts 46'; Surman 59' | Report | Cahill 6', 38', 71'; Bilyaletdinov 60' | Stadium: Carrow Road; Attendance: 13,437; Referee: Grant Hegley |

=== League ===
| Round | 1 | 2 | 3 | 4 | 5 | 6 | 7 | 8 | 9 | 10 | 11 | 12 | 13 | 14 | 15 | 16 | 17 | 18 | 19 | 20 | 21 | 22 | 23 |
|---|---|---|---|---|---|---|---|---|---|---|---|---|---|---|---|---|---|---|---|---|---|---|---|
| Result | 2–3 | 1–0 | 2–0 | 1–1 | 2–1 | 1–3 | 1–0 | 0–2 | 4–3 | 3–0 | 0–0 | 1–2 | 1–0 | 1–3 | 2–2 | 1–1 | 3–3 | 1–1 | 4–1 | 2–1 | 0–2 | 2–1 | 4–2 |
| Position | 15 | 12 | 7 | 7 | 7 | 8 | 4 | 6 | 3 | 3 | 3 | 5 | 4 | 5 | 7 | 5 | 8 | 8 | 5 | 4 | 6 | 5 | 5 |

| Round | 24 | 25 | 26 | 27 | 28 | 29 | 30 | 31 | 32 | 33 | 34 | 35 | 36 | 37 | 38 | 39 | 40 | 41 | 42 | 43 | 44 | 45 | 46 |
|---|---|---|---|---|---|---|---|---|---|---|---|---|---|---|---|---|---|---|---|---|---|---|---|
| Result | 1–0 | 1–1 | 1–1 | 2–1 | 0–0 | 2–1 | 1–2 | 2–1 | 2–2 | 1–1 | 2–0 | 1–1 | 3–2 | 3–1 | 1–1 | 6–0 | 0–3 | 2–2 | 2–1 | 5–1 | 3–2 | 1–0 | 2–2 |
| Position | 3 | 3 | 4 | 3 | 2 | 2 | 4 | 3 | 5 | 5 | 4 | 4 | 3 | 2 | 2 | 2 | 2 | 3 | 3 | 2 | 2 | 2 | 2 |

==== August ====
| 6 August 2010 | Norwich City | 2–3 | Watford | Norwich, Norfolk |
| 19:45 BST | Crofts 52'; Nelson 90' | Report | Eustace 14'; Graham 24', 81' | Stadium: Carrow Road; Attendance: 24,348; Referee: Nigel Miller |

| 14 August 2010 | Scunthorpe United | 0–1 | Norwich City | Scunthorpe, North Lincolnshire |
| 15:00 BST | | Report | Holt 90' | Stadium: Glanford Park; Attendance: 6,042; Referee: Chris Sarginson |

| 21 August 2010 | Norwich City | 2–0 | Swansea City | Norwich, Norfolk |
| 15:00 BST | Williams 86' (o.g.); Jackson 90' | Report | | Stadium: Carrow Road; Attendance: 23,852; Referee: Phil Crossley |

| 28 August 2010 | Nottingham Forest | 1–1 | Norwich City | Nottingham, Nottinghamshire |
| 15:00 BST | Blackstock 35' (pen.) | Report | Crofts 42' | Stadium: City Ground; Attendance: Scott Mathieson; Referee: 21,890 |

City got off to a bad start losing 3–2 to Watford who were expected to struggle over the season. However City would record their first league win of the season in the next game away at Scunthorpe. Grant Holt grabbed a last minute winner, something that became common in City's season. Next up were Swansea and City won again with late goals in dramatic circumstances. After saving a penalty from Swansea, City would again win it late with an Ashley Williams o.g. and Simeon Jackson netting his first of the season, and City would then go onto grab a point away at Nottingham Forest with Andrew Crofts scoring his first goal for Norwich.

==== September ====
| 11 September 2010 | Norwich City | 2–1 | Barnsley | Norwich, Norfolk |
| 15:00 BST | Foster 71' (o.g.); C. Martin 80' | Report | McEveley 45' | Stadium: Carrow Road; Attendance: 24,624; Referee: Gavin Ward |

| 14 September 2010 | Doncaster Rovers | 3–1 | Norwich City | Doncaster, South Yorkshire |
| 19:45 BST | Coppinger 14', 50', 86' | Report | R. Martin 64' | Stadium: Keepmoat Stadium; Attendance: 9,314; Referee: Eddie Ilderton |

| 18 September 2010 | Preston North End | 0–1 | Norwich City | Preston, Lancashire |
| 15:00 BST | | Report | Holt 62' | Stadium: Deepdale; Attendance: 18,417; Referee: Colin Webster |

| 25 September 2010 | Norwich City | 0–2 | Hull City | Norwich, Norfolk |
| 15:00 BST | | Report | Koren 83'; Cairney 88' | Stadium: Carrow Road; Attendance: 24,947; Referee: David Foster |

| 28 September 2010 | Norwich City | 4–3 | Leicester City | Norwich, Norfolk |
| 19:45 BST | Crofts 31'; Hoolahan 53' (pen.), 74'; Drury 62' | Report | Waghorn 2'; Fryatt 65', 78' (red card) 79' | Stadium: Carrow Road; Attendance: 25,091; Referee: Peter Walton |

After a decent start to the season, City began September with a 2–1 win over Barnsley with an own goal and Chris Martin getting the victory, before City suffered their first away defeat of the season at the hands of Doncaster losing 3–1, James Coppinger scoring a hat-trick with Russell Martin grabbing a consolation. However Norwich bounced straight back with a 1–0 away win at Preston, Grant Holt grabbing only his second goal of the season. Norwich then faced a Hull side without an away win in 18 months and even though Norwich dominated the game for large parts Hull stole the victory with two late goals, however City immediately bounced back with a 4–3 win against Leicester, Andrew Crofts equalised for City after an early mistake from John Ruddy allowed Martyn Waghorn to give Leicester the lead. Wes Hoolahan scored two second half goals with Adam Drury himself getting his first goal in over four years.

==== October ====
| 2 October 2010 | Bristol City | 0–3 | Norwich City | Bristol |
| 15:00 BST | | Report | Jackson 23', 64'; Hoolahan 35' (pen.) | Stadium: Ashton Gate; Attendance: 14,124; Referee: Fred Graham |

| 16 October 2010 | Queens Park Rangers | 0–0 | Norwich City | Shepherd's Bush, London |
| 15:00 BST | | Report | | Stadium: Loftus Road; Attendance: 18,059; Referee: Andy Penn |

| 19 October 2010 | Norwich City | 1–2 | Crystal Palace | Norwich, Norfolk |
| 19:45 BST | Holt 44' | Report | Bennett 56'; Gardner 63' | Stadium: Carrow Road; Attendance: 24,975; Referee: Grant Hegley |

| 23 October 2010 | Norwich City | 1–0 | Middlesbrough | Norwich, Norfolk |
| 15:00 BST | Jackson 44' | Report | | Stadium: Carrow Road; Attendance: 25,410; Referee: James Linnington |

| 30 October 2010 | Cardiff City | 3–1 | Norwich City | Cardiff, Wales |
| 15:00 BST | Bothroyd 9'; Chopra 12'; Whittingham 37' (pen.) | Report | Hoolahan 34' | Stadium: Cardiff City Stadium; Attendance: 24,634; Referee: Graham Scott |

Norwich began October still in the play-off positions and began with a 3–0 win away at Bristol City with Wes Hoolahan opening the scoring with a penalty before a Simeon Jackson double gave Norwich the victory. After two weeks off, City faced top of the league QPR who had yet to concede a goal at Loftus Road or drop a point, and Wes Hoolahan had the perfect opportunity to put City ahead but his penalty went wide. However City held on for a point, but in the following game City lost to their bogey side Crystal Palace in what would come to be their only away win of the season, Grant Holt gave City the lead in the first half before Palace would come back to win the game in the second half. City then faced Middlesbrough and scored a 1–0 win in a tight affair with Simeon Jackson scoring before half time, before City faced Cardiff away from home and lost 3–1.

==== November ====
| 6 November 2010 | Norwich City | 2–2 | Burnley | Norwich, Norfolk |
| 15:00 GMT | C. Martin 71'; Crofts 90' (yellow card) 84' (yellow-red card) 90' | Report | Paterson 26', 33' | Stadium: Carrow Road; Attendance: 24,519; Referee: Trevor Kettle |

| 9 November 2010 | Millwall | 1–1 | Norwich City | Bermondsey, London |
| 19:45 GMT | Marquis 90' | Report | Fox 75' | Stadium: The Den; Attendance: 10,211; Referee: Mark Haywood |

| 13 November 2010 | Reading | 3–3 | Norwich City | Reading, Berkshire |
| 17:20 GMT | Harte 29'; Hunt 59'; Long 62' (pen.) | Report | R. Martin 16'; Holt 26' (red card) 45'; C. Martin 32' | Stadium: Madejski Stadium; Attendance: 15,934; Referee: Michael Oliver |

| 20 November 2010 | Norwich City | 1–1 | Leeds United | Norwich, Norfolk |
| 15:00 GMT | Barnett 65' | Report | Gradel 13' | Stadium: Carrow Road; Attendance: 26,315; Referee: Mick Russell |

| 28 November 2010 | Norwich City | 4–1 | Ipswich Town | Norwich, Norfolk |
| 13:15 GMT | Holt 13', 35', 76'; Hoolahan 78' | Report | Delaney 28' (red card) 37' | Stadium: Carrow Road; Attendance: 26,532; Referee: Keith Hill |

Norwich looked to bounce back from their defeat at Cardiff a week later with the visit of Burnley to Carrow Road. The visitors tore Norwich apart in the first half taking a 2–0 lead into half-time. However City showed fighting spirit with Chris Martin reducing the deficit and Andrew Crofts getting an injury time equaliser. Norwich then faced fellow promoted side Millwall, City took the lead through a David Fox volley and looked to be heading for a victory before Millwall equalised with virtually the last kick of the game. Norwich were then frustrated at Reading, taking a 3–1 lead into half-time with Russell Martin, Grant Holt and Chris Martin scoring the goals. However Holt would be wrongly sent off before half-time and Reading got a 3–3 draw out of the game. Holt's ban for the card was overturned. City then faced fellow promotion contenders Leeds at Carrow Road and got a 1–1 draw with Leon Barnett scoring his first goal for the club in the second half. The next game was the East Anglian derby – Holt gave city the lead before Damien Delaney equalised. Holt then put City back in front before Delanay was sent off. Holt then sealed his hat-trick before Hoolahan quickly made it 4–1. City ended the month oback in the play-off places.

==== December ====
| 4 December 2010 | Derby County | 1–2 | Norwich City | Derby, Derbyshire |
| 15:00 GMT | Commons 17' | Report | Barker 11' (o.g.); C. Martin 13' | Stadium: Pride Park Stadium; Attendance: 26,134; Referee: Keith Stroud |

| 11 December 2010 | Norwich City | 0–2 | Portsmouth | Norwich, Norfolk |
| 15:00 GMT | Barnett (yellow card) 49' (yellow-red card) 90' | Report | Kitson 73'; Halford 90' (pen.) | Stadium: Carrow Road; Attendance: 25,215; Referee: Simon Hooper |

| 18 December 2010 | Coventry City | 1–2 | Norwich City | Coventry, West Midlands |
| 15:00 GMT | Gunnarsson (red card) 34'; King 73' | Report | Holt 64', 87' | Stadium: Ricoh Arena; Attendance: 15,230; Referee: Chris Sarginson |

| 28 December 2010 | Norwich City | 4–2 | Sheffield United | Norwich, Norfolk |
| 15:00 GMT | Nelson 20'; Hoolahan 64' (pen.), 84' (pen.), 90' | Report | Reid 17'; Cresswell 29'; Quinn (red card) 90' | Stadium: Carrow Road; Attendance: 25,809; Referee: Phil Crossley |

==== January ====
| 1 January 2011 | Norwich City | 1–0 | Queens Park Rangers | Norwich, Norfolk |
| 15:00 GMT | R. Martin 10' | Report | Connolly (red card) 51' | Stadium: Carrow Road; Attendance: 26,273; Referee: Jon Moss |

| 3 January 2011 | Middlesbrough | 1–1 | Norwich City | Middlesbrough, North Yorkshire |
| 15:00 GMT | Barnett 21' (o.g.) | Report | Holt 12' | Stadium: Riverside Stadium; Attendance: 16,853; Referee: Graham Salisbury |

| 15 January 2011 | Norwich City | 1–1 | Cardiff City | Norwich, Norfolk |
| 15:00 GMT | R. Martin 90' | Report | Parkin 7' | Stadium: Carrow Road; Attendance: 25,270; Referee: Keith Stroud |

| 22 January 2011 | Sheffield United | 1–2 | Norwich City | Sheffield, South Yorkshire |
| 15:00 GMT | Evans 69' | Report | Crofts 61', 80' | Stadium: Bramall Lane; Attendance: 20,725; Referee: Andy Haines |

| 29 January 2011 | Crystal Palace | 0–0 | Norwich City | Selhurst, London |
| 15:00 GMT | | Report | | Stadium: Selhurst Park; Attendance: 16,327; Referee: Danny McDermid |

==== February ====
| 1 February 2011 | Norwich City | 2–1 | Millwall | Norwich, Norfolk |
| 19:45 GMT | Ward 77'; Lansbury 90' | Report | T. Robinson 56' | Stadium: Carrow Road; Attendance: 24,571; Referee: Pat Miller |

| 5 February 2011 | Burnley | 2–1 | Norwich City | Burnley, Lancashire |
| 15:00 GMT | Marney 33'; Rodriguez 81' | Report | Holt 65' | Stadium: Turf Moor; Attendance: 14,859; Referee: Phil Gibbs |

| 12 February 2011 | Norwich City | 2–1 | Reading | Norwich, Norfolk |
| 15:00 GMT | Lansbury 16'; Holt 90' | Report | Long 26'; Karacan (red card) 65' | Stadium: Carrow Road; Attendance: 25,560; Referee: Scott Mathieson |

| 19 February 2011 | Leeds United | 2–2 | Norwich City | Leeds, West Yorkshire |
| 15:00 GMT | Becchio 16'; Somma 75' | Report | Lansbury 45'; Hoolahan 69' | Stadium: Elland Road; Attendance: 31,601; Referee: Neil Swarbrick |

| 22 February 2011 | Norwich City | 1–1 | Doncaster Rovers | Norwich, Norfolk |
| 19:45 GMT | Holt 31' | Report | Drury 83' (o.g.) | Stadium: Carrow Road; Attendance: 25,529; Referee: Russell Booth |

| 26 February 2011 | Barnsley | 0–2 | Norwich City | Barnsley, South Yorkshire |
| 15:00 GMT | | Report | Crofts 34', 40' | Stadium: Oakwell; Attendance: 12,461; Referee: Eddie Ilderton |

==== March ====
| 5 March 2011 | Norwich City | 1–1 | Preston North End | Norwich, Norfolk |
| 15:00 GMT | Holt 62' | Report | Brown 60' | Stadium: Carrow Road; Attendance: 25,572; Referee: Craig Pawson |

| 8 March 2011 | Leicester City | 2–3 | Norwich City | Leicester, Leicestershire |
| 19:45 GMT | Wellens 23'; Gallagher 90' | Report | Hoolahan 21'; Holt 49' (pen.); Wilbraham 59' | Stadium: Walkers Stadium; Attendance: 23,398; Referee: Chris Foy |

| 14 March 2011 | Norwich City | 3–1 | Bristol City | Norwich, Norfolk |
| 19:45 GMT | Holt 2' (pen.); Lansbury 89'; Surman 90' | Report | Adomah 65' | Stadium: Carrow Road; Attendance: 24,428; Referee: Carl Boyeson |

| 19 March 2011 | Hull City | 1–1 | Norwich City | Kingston upon Hull, East Riding of Yorkshire |
| 15:00 GMT | Barmby 73' | Report | Whitbread 27' | Stadium: KC Stadium; Attendance: 22,967; Referee: Rob Shoebridge |

==== April ====
| 2 April 2011 | Norwich City | 6–0 | Scunthorpe United | Norwich, Norfolk |
| 15:00 BST | Holt 10', 32' (pen.), 61'; Jackson 75', 77', 90' | Report | Reid (red card) 31' | Stadium: Carrow Road; Attendance: 26,512; Referee: Oliver Langford |

| 9 April 2011 | Swansea City | 3–0 | Norwich City | Swansea, Wales |
| 17:20 BST | Borini 5'; Gower 29'; Priskin 90' | Report | | Stadium: Liberty Stadium; Attendance: 19,094; Referee: Anthony Bates |

| 12 April 2011 | Watford | 2–2 | Norwich City | Watford, Hertfordshire |
| 19:45 BST | Graham 26'; Cowie 36' | Report | Vokes 2'; Jackson 69' | Stadium: Vicarage Road; Attendance: 13,777; Referee: Anthony Taylor |

| 15 April 2011 | Norwich City | 2–1 | Nottingham Forest | Norwich, Norfolk |
| 19:45 BST | Holt 10'; Surman 37' | Report | Tyson 3'; Konchesky (yellow card) 38' (yellow-red card) 90' | Stadium: Carrow Road; Attendance: 26,188; Referee: Neil Swarbrick |

| 21 April 2011 | Ipswich Town | 1–5 | Norwich City | Ipswich, Suffolk |
| 19:45 BST | Bullard 78' | Report | Surman 13'; McAuley 24' (o.g.); Jackson 73'; R. Martin 83'; Pacheco 90' | Stadium: Portman Road; Attendance: 29,258; Referee: Jon Moss |

| 25 April 2011 | Norwich City | 3–2 | Derby County | Norwich, Norfolk |
| 15:00 BST | Jackson 45', 60', 90' | Report | Davies 54'; Bueno 63' | Stadium: Carrow Road; Attendance: 26,078; Referee: Andy Haines |

==== May ====
| 2 May 2011 | Portsmouth | 0–1 | Norwich City | Portsmouth, Hampshire |
| 19:45 BST | | Report | Jackson 50' | Stadium: Fratton Park; Attendance: 17,113; Referee: Andy D'Urso |

| 7 May 2011 | Norwich City | 2–2 | Coventry City | Norwich, Norfolk |
| 12:45 BST | Holt 56'; Pacheco 62' | Report | Keogh 54'; Jutkiewicz 64' | Stadium: Carrow Road; Attendance: 26,268; Referee: Darren Deadman |

=== FA Cup ===
| Round | 3 |
|---|---|
| Result | 0–1 |

| 8 January 2011 Round 3 | Norwich City | 0–1 | Leyton Orient | Norwich, Norfolk |
| 15:00 GMT | | Report | Smith 20' | Stadium: Carrow Road; Attendance: 18,087; Referee: Dean Whitestone |

=== League Cup ===
| Round | 1 | 2 |
|---|---|---|
| Result | 4–1 | 1–3 |

| 10 August 2010 Round 1 | Norwich City | 4–1 | Gillingham | Norwich, Norfolk |
| 19:45 BST | C. Martin 26', 90'; Holt 32', 55' | Report | Palmer 12' | Stadium: Carrow Road; Attendance: 13,068; Referee: Andy D'Urso |

| 24 August 2010 Round 2 | Blackburn Rovers | 3–1 | Norwich City | Blackburn, Lancashire |
| 20:00 BST | M. Diouf 29', 80', 84' | Report | Askou 90' | Stadium: Ewood Park; Attendance: 9,235; Referee: Jon Moss |

== Final league table ==
| Pos | Team | Pld | W | D | L | GF | GA | GD | Pts | Promotion, qualification or relegation |
|---|---|---|---|---|---|---|---|---|---|---|
| 1 | Queens Park Rangers (C, P) | 46 | 24 | 16 | 6 | 71 | 32 | +39 | 88 | Promotion to the Premier League |
| 2 | Norwich City (P) | 46 | 23 | 15 | 8 | 83 | 58 | +25 | 84 | Promotion to the Premier League |
| 3 | Swansea City (O, P) | 46 | 24 | 8 | 14 | 69 | 42 | +27 | 80 | Qualification for Championship play-offs |
| 4 | Cardiff City | 46 | 23 | 11 | 12 | 76 | 54 | +22 | 80 | Qualification for Championship play-offs |
| 5 | Reading | 46 | 20 | 17 | 9 | 77 | 51 | +26 | 77 | Qualification for Championship play-offs |

Updated to match(es) played on 7 May 2011. Source: The Football League
Rules for classification: 1) points; 2) goal difference; 3) number of goals scored.
(C) Champions; (O) Play-off winners; (P) Promoted
