= 2011–12 Norwich City F.C. season =

Norwich City
2011–12 season
- Chairman: Alan Bowkett
- Manager: Paul Lambert
- Stadium: Carrow Road
- Premier League: 12th (47 points)
- FA Cup: 5th round
- League Cup: 2nd round
- Top goalscorer: League: Grant Holt (15); All: Grant Holt (17)
- Highest home attendance: 26,819 (vs. Liverpool, 28 April 2012)
- Lowest home attendance: 13,009 (vs. MK Dons, 23 August 2011)
- Average home league attendance: 26,548
Home colours	Away colours

The 2011–12 season was the 110th season of football for Norwich City. It was their first season in the Premier League for six years following promotion from the Football League One as champions in 2009–10 and as runners-up in the Football League Championship the previous season.

Norwich City ended the season in 12th place after winning their last league game 2–0 against Aston Villa on 13 May 2012. They collected 47 points from 38 games.

== Club staff ==
=== Backroom staff ===
Position	Name
Manager	(Scotland) Paul Lambert
Assistant manager	(England) Ian Culverhouse
Head of Football Operations	(England) Gary Karsa
Reserve team manager	Vacant
Goalkeeping coach	(England) Jeff Wood
Head of Strength and Conditioning	(England) Mike Watts
Academy manager	(England) Ricky Martin
Assistant Academy Manager	(Scotland) Gary Holt
Under 14s coach	(England) Neil Adams
Performance and Team Analyst	(England) Gareth Payne
Head of physiotherapy	(England) Neal Reynolds
Physiotherapist	(England) Stuart Wardle
Club doctor	(England) Dr Nick Wiford
Chief Scout	(England) Colin Jackson

=== Board of directors ===
Position	Name
Chairman	(England) Alan Bowkett
Chief Executive	(Scotland) David McNally
Joint Majority Shareholder	(England) Delia Smith (Wales) Michael Wynn-Jones
Directors	(England) Stephen Fry (England) Michael Foulger (England) Stephan Phillips

== Players ==
=== Current squad ===
As of 31 January 2012.

Note: Flags indicate national team as defined under FIFA eligibility rules; some limited exceptions apply. Players may hold more than one non-FIFA nationality.

No.	Pos.	Nation	Player
1	GK	ENG	John Ruddy
2	DF	SCO	Russell Martin (3rd captain)
3	DF	ENG	Adam Drury
4	MF	ENG	Bradley Johnson
5	FW	WAL	Steve Morison
6	DF	USA	Zak Whitbread
7	MF	WAL	Andrew Crofts
8	FW	ENG	James Vaughan
9	FW	ENG	Grant Holt (captain)
10	FW	CAN	Simeon Jackson
11	MF	ENG	Andrew Surman
12	MF	IRL	Anthony Pilkington
13	GK	ENG	Declan Rudd

No.	Pos.	Nation	Player
14	MF	IRL	Wes Hoolahan (vice-captain)
15	MF	ENG	David Fox
17	MF	ENG	Elliott Bennett
19	MF	SCO	Simon Lappin
20	DF	ENG	Leon Barnett
21	FW	ENG	Aaron Wilbraham
22	DF	ENG	Elliott Ward
23	DF	IRL	Marc Tierney
24	MF	ENG	Jonny Howson
25	DF	ENG	Kyle Naughton (on loan from Tottenham Hotspur)
26	DF	ESP	Daniel Ayala
30	MF	NIR	Matt Ball
31	GK	ENG	Jed Steer

=== Out on loan ===
Note: Flags indicate national team as defined under FIFA eligibility rules; some limited exceptions apply. Players may hold more than one non-FIFA nationality.

No.	Pos.	Nation	Player
16	FW	ENG	Chris Martin (at Crystal Palace until 1 June 2012)
18	MF	ENG	Korey Smith (at Barnsley until 1 June 2012)
27	MF	ENG	Tom Adeyemi (at Oldham Athletic until 10 March 2012)
28	DF	ENG	George Francomb (at Hibernian until 1 June 2012)
29	MF	WAL	Josh Dawkin (at Kettering Town until 1 June 2012)

=== Transfers ===
==== In ====
No.	Pos.	Nat.	Name	Age	EU	Moving from	Type	Transfer window	Ends	Transfer fee	Source
8	FW	(England)	James Vaughan	22	EU	Everton	Transfer	Summer	2014	Undisclosed	BBC Football
5	FW	(Wales) (England)	Steve Morison	27	EU	Millwall	Transfer	Summer	2014	Undisclosed	BBC Football
17	MF	(England)	Elliott Bennett	22	EU	Brighton & Hove Albion	Transfer	Summer	2014	Undisclosed	BBC Football
24	DF	(Belgium)	Ritchie De Laet	22	EU	Manchester United	Loan	Summer	2012		BBC Football
4	MF	(England)	Bradley Johnson	24	EU	Leeds United	Transfer	Summer	2014	Free	BBC Football
12	MF	(Republic of Ireland)	Anthony Pilkington	23	EU	Huddersfield Town (England)	Transfer	Summer	2014	Undisclosed	Sky Sports
25	DF	(England)	Kyle Naughton	22	EU	Tottenham Hotspur	Loan	Summer	2012		BBC Football
26	DF	(Spain)	Daniel Ayala	20	EU	Liverpool	Transfer	Summer		£800,000	BBC Football
24	MF	(England)	Jonathan Howson	23	EU	Leeds United	Transfer	Winter	2015		BBC Football
33	DF	(England)	Ryan Bennett	21	EU	Peterborough United	Transfer	Winter	2015		BBC Football

==== Out ====
No.	Pos.	Name	Country	Age	Type	Moving to	Transfer window	Transfer fee	Apps	Goals	Source
4	MF	Matthew Gill	(England)	30	Out of Contract	Bristol Rovers	Summer	N/A	12	0	Norwich City
25	FW	Luke Daley	(England)	21	Transfer	Plymouth Argyle	Summer	Undisclosed	11	0	BBC Football
33	DF	Jens Berthel Askou	(Denmark)	28	Out of Contract	Vejle Kolding (Denmark)	Summer	N/A	27	2	Norwich City
36	DF	Sam Habergham	(England)	19	Out of Contract	Tamworth	Summer	N/A	0	0	Norwich City
30	DF	Owain Tudur Jones	(Wales)	27	Released	Inverness Caledonian Thistle (Scotland)	Summer	N/A	5	1	
31	GK	Jed Steer	(England)	18	Loan	Yeovil Town	Summer	Three-month loan			BBC Football
26	DF	Steven Smith	(Scotland)	26	Transfer	Preston North End	Summer	Free	7	0	Sky Sports
	MF	Tom Adeyemi	(England)	35	Loan	Oldham Athletic	Summer	Five-month loan	11	0	BBC Football
	MF	Stephen Hughes	(Scotland)	28	Contract terminated	Motherwell (Scotland)	Summer	Free	36	3	BBC Football
	FW	Cody McDonald	(England)	25	Transfer	Coventry City	Summer	Undisclosed	32	5	Norwich City
	MF	Anthony McNamee	(England)	27	Transfer	MK Dons	Summer	Free	37	1	Norwich City
	MF	Oli Johnson	(England)	24	Contract terminated	Oxford United	Winter	Free	24	4	BBC Football
28	MF	George Francomb	(England)	20	Loan	Hibernian (Scotland)	Winter	Loan	4	0	BBC Football

EU = if holds or not a European Union passport; Country: when 2 flags, 1st flag = country that plays for internationally, 2nd flag = country of birth; N = number on jersey; P = Position (for position name, pause mouse pointer on abbreviation); Name = Name on jersey (for more extensive name, pause mouse pointer on name); Age = age on the day of the signing; Moving from = only indicate the club the player was playing before start playing for this club in this season, for the type of the moving see Status column; Moving to = only indicates the club the player is going to play next, for the type of the moving see Status column; Ends = when the player's current contract ends; n/a = Not applicable.

== Statistics ==
=== Appearances, goals and cards ===
Last updated on 14 April 2012.
(Substitute appearances in brackets)

No.	Pos.	Name	League		FA Cup		League Cup		Total		Discipline	
No.	Pos.	Name	Apps	Goals	Apps	Goals	Apps	Goals	Apps	Goals	Yellow card	Red card
1	GK	(England) John Ruddy	32	0	0	0	0	0	32	0	1	1
2	DF	(Scotland) Russell Martin	26 (2)	2	3	0	1	0	30 (2)	2	1	0
3	DF	(England) Adam Drury	9	0	3	0	1	0	13	0	2	0
4	MF	(England) Bradley Johnson	21 (3)	2	0 (1)	0	0	0	21 (4)	2	0	0
5	FW	(Wales) Steve Morison	21 (8)	9	1 (1)	1	0 (1)	0	22 (10)	10	1	0
6	DF	(United States) Zak Whitbread	18	0	2	0	1	0	21	0	2	0
7	MF	(Wales) Andrew Crofts	13 (10)	0	2	0	0	0	15 (10)	0	3	0
8	FW	(England) James Vaughan	0 (3)	0	0 (1)	0	0	0	0 (4)	0	0	0
9	FW	(England) Grant Holt	20 (11)	15	2	2	0	0	22 (11)	17	3	0
10	FW	(Canada) Simeon Jackson	8 (12)	3	2 (1)	2	1	0	11 (13)	5	0	0
11	MF	(England) Andrew Surman	20 (3)	4	1	1	1	0	22 (3)	5	1	0
12	MF	(Republic of Ireland) Anthony Pilkington	21 (5)	8	2	0	0	0	23 (5)	8	1	0
13	GK	(England) Declan Rudd	1 (1)	0	1	0	1	0	3 (1)	0	0	0
14	MF	(Republic of Ireland) Wes Hoolahan	22 (7)	4	3	1	1	0	26 (7)	5	2	0
15	MF	(England) David Fox	17 (4)	0	3	0	1	0	21 (4)	0	2	0
17	MF	(England) Elliott Bennett	12 (9)	1	2 (1)	0	0	0	14 (10)	1	2	0
18	MF	(England) Korey Smith	0	0	0	0	1	0	1	0	0	0
19	MF	(Scotland) Simon Lappin	1	0	0	0	0 (2)	0	1 (2)	0	0	0
20	DF	(England) Leon Barnett	13 (4)	1	0	0	0	0	14 (4)	1	2	1
21	FW	(England) Aaron Wilbraham	0 (3)	1	0 (3)	0	1	0	1 (6)	1	0	0
22	DF	(England) Elliott Ward	2	0	1	0	0	0	3	0	0	0
23	DF	(England) Marc Tierney	17	0	0	0	0	0	17	0	2	0
24	DF	(Belgium) Ritchie De Laet	6	1	0	0	0 (1)	0	6 (1)	1	1	0
24	MF	(England) Jonny Howson	1	1	0	0	0	0	0	1	0	0
25	DF	(England) Kyle Naughton	22 (1)	0	0	0	0	0	22 (1)	0	5	0
26	DF	(Spain) Daniel Ayala	6 (1)	0	2	0	1	0	9 (1)	0	1	0
28	DF	(England) George Francomb	0	0	0	0	0	0	0	0	0	0
29	MF	(Wales) Josh Dawkin	0	0	0	0	0	0	0	0	0	0
30	MF	(England) Matt Ball	0	0	0	0	0	0	0	0	0	0
31	GK	(England) Jed Steer	0	0	2	0	0	0	0	0	0	0
Players out on loan:
16	FW	(England) Chris Martin	3 (1)	0	0	0	0	0	3 (1)	0	0	0
27	MF	(England) Tom Adeyemi	0	0	0	0	0	0	0	0	0	0
—	FW	(England) Oli Johnson	0	0	0	0	0	0	0	0	0	0

=== Captains ===
Accounts for all competitions.

No.	Pos.	Name	Starts
9	FW	(England) Grant Holt	16
14	MF	(Republic of Ireland) Wes Hoolahan	9
2	DF	(Scotland) Russell Martin	3

=== Top goalscorers ===
Lists at most top 10 goalscorers only.
Legend: LG = Premier League; L. Cup = League Cup
Classification: 1. Goals in total 2. Goals in league 3. Goals in FA Cup 4. Goals in League Cup 5. Most recently scored

Rank	#	Pos.	Player	LG	FA Cup	L. Cup	Total	Last scored against
1	9	FW	(England) Grant Holt	15	2	0	17	(England) Aston Villa (Premier League)
2	5	FW	(Wales) Steve Morison	9	1	0	10	(England) Arsenal (Premier League)
3	12	MF	(Republic of Ireland) Anthony Pilkington	8	0	0	8	(England) Tottenham Hotspur (Premier League)
4	10	FW	(Canada) Simeon Jackson	3	2	0	5	(England) Aston Villa (Premier League)
4	14	MF	(Republic of Ireland) Wes Hoolahan	4	1	0	5	(England) Arsenal (Premier League)
4	11	MF	(England) Andrew Surman	4	1	0	5	(England) Manchester City (Premier League)
7	2	DF	(Scotland) Russell Martin	2	0	0	2	(England) Queens Park Rangers (Premier League)
7	4	MF	(England) Bradley Johnson	2	0	0	2	(England) Blackburn Rovers (Premier League)
9	20	DF	(England) Leon Barnett	1	0	0	1	(England) Sunderland (Premier League)
9	24	DF	(Belgium) Ritchie De Laet	1	0	0	1	(England) Stoke City (Premier League)

=== Penalties awarded ===
Last updated on 24 March 2012.

Date	Success?	Penalty Taker	Opponent	Competition
29 October	✓	(England) Grant Holt	Blackburn Rovers	Premier League
7 January	✗	(England) Grant Holt	Burnley	FA Cup
24 March	✓	(England) Grant Holt	Wolves	Premier League

== Competitions ==
Win Draw Loss

=== Pre-season ===
Note: this section relates to first team friendlies only.

16 July 2011	Gorleston	0–7	Norwich City	Great Yarmouth, Norfolk
15:00 BST		Report	Holt 7', 29' (pen.); Whitbread 13'; K. Smith 35'; Jackson 44'; B. Johnson 50'; Wilbraham 75'	Stadium: Emerald Park; Attendance: 1,100; Referee: Michael George

20 July 2011	Sparta/RSV Göttingen (Germany)	0–8	Norwich City	Göttingen, Lower Saxony (Germany)
17:30 BST		Report	Vaughan 7', 17'; Jackson 21'; Francomb 30'; Morison 50'; Bennett 67'; Ward 80', 90'	Stadium: Jahnstadion

23 July 2011	Nordhausen/Regional Select XI (Germany)	0–11	Norwich City	Eichsfeld, Thuringia (Germany)
15:00 BST		Report	Morison 19'; Hoolahan 20'; Crofts 33'; Wilbraham 36'; Surman 44'; C. Martin 54'; Jackson 55', 75'; Holt 70', 89'; B. Johnson 85'	Stadium: Teistungen

26 July 2011	Crystal Palace	1–0	Norwich City	Croydon, London
19:30 BST	Pinney 89'	Report		Stadium: Selhurst Park; Attendance: 5,188; Referee: Pat Miller

28 July 2011	Southend United	0–0	Norwich City	Southend-on-Sea, Essex
19:45 BST		Report		Stadium: Roots Hall; Attendance: Unknown; Referee: Darren Deadman

30 July 2011	Coventry City	0–3	Norwich City	Coventry, West Midlands
15:00 BST		Report	Wilbraham 2'; Morison 67'; Bennett 87'	Stadium: Ricoh Arena; Attendance: Unknown; Referee: Phil Gibbs

3 August 2011	Norwich City	1–1	(Spain) Real Zaragoza	Norwich, Norfolk
19:30 BST	De Laet 15'	Report	Braulio 45'	Stadium: Carrow Road; Attendance: 10,825; Referee: Neil Swarbrick

6 August 2011	Norwich City	3–0	(Italy) Parma	Norwich, Norfolk
15:00 BST	Holt 34'; Surman 62', 86'	Report		Stadium: Carrow Road; Attendance: 13,067; Referee: Michael Oliver

=== Premier League ===
==== Table ====
Pos	Team	Pld	W	D	L	GF	GA	GD	Pts
10	West Bromwich Albion	38	13	8	17	45	52	−7	47
11	Swansea City	38	12	11	15	44	51	−7	47
12	Norwich City	38	12	11	15	52	66	−14	47
13	Sunderland	38	11	12	15	45	46	−1	45
14	Stoke City	38	11	12	15	36	53	−17	45

Source: Barclays Premier League
Rules for classification: 1) points; 2) goal difference; 3) number of goals scored.

==== Results by round ====
Round	1	2	3	4	5	6	7	8	9	10	11	12	13	14	15	16	17	18	19	20	21	22	23	24	25	26	27	28	29	30	31	32	33	34	35	36	37	38
Ground	A	H	A	H	A	H	A	H	A	H	A	H	H	A	H	A	A	H	H	A	A	H	A	H	A	H	A	H	A	H	A	H	A	H	A	H	A	H
Result	D	D	L	L	W	W	L	W	D	D	L	L	W	L	W	D	D	L	D	W	W	D	L	W	W	L	L	D	L	W	L	D	W	L	L	L	D	W
Position	6	10	14	17	13	9	9	9	8	8	9	11	10	11	10	9	9	11	11	9	9	9	11	9	8	8	10	12	13	11	12	12	10	11	12	13	13	12

Source: stats.football365.co.uk
A = Away; H = Home; W = Win; D = Draw; L = Loss

=== Premier League ===
13 August 2011 1	Wigan Athletic	1–1	Norwich City	Wigan, Greater Manchester
15:00 BST	Watson 21' (pen.) (yellow card) 84'; Diamé (yellow card) 85'	Report	Fox (yellow card) 1'; Hoolahan 45'; Morison (yellow card) 72'	Stadium: DW Stadium; Attendance: 17,454; Referee: Stuart Attwell

21 August 2011 2	Norwich City	1–1	Stoke City	Norwich, Norfolk
13:30 BST	De Laet 37'; Barnett (red card) 63'	Report	Woodgate (yellow card) 37'; Shawcross (yellow card) 39'; Jones 90+4'	Stadium: Carrow Road; Attendance: 26,272; Referee: Neil Swarbrick

27 August 2011 3	Chelsea	3–1	Norwich City	Hammersmith and Fulham, London
15:00 BST	Bosingwa 6', (yellow card) 36'; Torres (yellow card) 56'; Lampard 82' (pen.); Mata 90+11'	Report	Crofts (yellow card) 41'; Naughton (yellow card) 59'; Holt 63'; Ruddy (red card) 80'	Stadium: Stamford Bridge; Attendance: 41,765; Referee: Mike Jones

11 September 2011 4	Norwich City	0–1	West Bromwich Albion	Norwich, Norfolk
13:30 BST	De Laet (yellow card) 75'	Report	Odemwingie 3'; Scharner (yellow card) 16'; Reid (yellow card) 90+5'	Stadium: Carrow Road; Attendance: 26,158; Referee: Mark Halsey

17 September 2011 5	Bolton Wanderers	1–2	Norwich City	Bolton, Greater Manchester
15:00 BST	Jääskeläinen (yellow card) 9'; Klasnić (red card) 45+2'; Reo-Coker (yellow card) 54'; Petrov 64' (pen.); Robinson (yellow card) 80'	Report	Pilkington 37'; B. Johnson 42'; Holt (yellow card) 90+2'	Stadium: Reebok Stadium; Attendance: 21,223; Referee: Howard Webb

26 September 2011 6	Norwich City	2–1	Sunderland	Norwich, Norfolk
20:00 BST	Barnett 31'; Morison 49'; Ruddy (yellow card) 90+2'; Naughton (yellow card) 90+4'	Report	Richardson 86'; O'Shea (yellow card) 89'	Stadium: Carrow Road; Attendance: 26,107; Referee: Chris Foy

1 October 2011 7	Manchester United	2–0	Norwich City	Trafford, Greater Manchester
15:00 BST	Anderson 68'; Welbeck (yellow card) 71', (goal) 87'	Report		Stadium: Old Trafford; Attendance: 75,514; Referee: Stuart Attwell

15 October 2011 8	Norwich City	3–1	Swansea City	Norwich, Norfolk
15:00 BST	Pilkington 1', 63'; R. Martin 10'	Report	Graham 12'; Monk (yellow card) 4'	Stadium: Carrow Road; Attendance: 26,567; Referee: Jon Moss

22 October 2011 9	Liverpool	1–1	Norwich City	Liverpool, Merseyside
17:30 BST	Bellamy 45+1'	Report	Tierney (yellow card) 34'; Holt 60'	Stadium: Anfield; Attendance: 44,931; Referee: Peter Walton

29 October 2011 10	Norwich City	3–3	Blackburn Rovers	Norwich, Norfolk
15:00 BST	Bennett (yellow card) 24'; Morison 53'; Barnett (yellow card) 64'; B. Johnson 82'; Holt 90+4' (pen.)	Report	Hoilett 45+3'; Yakubu 62'; Samba 64'; Lowe (yellow card) 79'	Stadium: Carrow Road; Attendance: 26,440; Referee: Anthony Taylor

5 November 2011 11	Aston Villa	3–2	Norwich City	Birmingham, West Midlands
15:00 GMT	Bent 30', 62'; N'Zogbia (yellow card) 37'; Agbonlahor 48'	Report	Pilkington 25', (yellow card) 75'; Hoolahan (yellow card) 33'; Crofts (yellow card) 45+1'; Barnett (yellow card) 45+2'; Morison 77'; Holt (yellow card) 90+1'	Stadium: Villa Park; Attendance: 35,290; Referee: Kevin Friend

19 November 2011 12	Norwich City	1–2	Arsenal	Norwich, Norfolk
12:45 GMT	Morison 16'; Bennett (yellow card) 66'; Tierney (yellow card) 81'; Holt (yellow card) 86'	Report	Van Persie 26', 59'	Stadium: Carrow Road; Attendance: 26,801; Referee: Phil Dowd

26 November 2011 13	Norwich City	2–1	QPR	Norwich, Norfolk
15:00 GMT	R. Martin 15'; Holt 73'; Naughton (yellow card) 87'	Report	Young 59'	Stadium: Carrow Road; Attendance: 26,781; Referee: Mark Clattenburg

3 December 2011 14	Manchester City	5–1	Norwich City	Manchester, Greater Manchester
15:00 GMT	Agüero 32'; Nasri 51'; Y. Touré 68'; Balotelli 88'; A. Johnson 90+1'	Report	Surman (yellow card) 24'; Morison 81'	Stadium: Etihad Stadium; Attendance: 47,201; Referee: Howard Webb

10 December 2011 15	Norwich City	4–2	Newcastle United	Norwich, Norfolk
15:00 GMT	Crofts (yellow card) 15'; Fox (yellow card) 34'; Hoolahan 39', (yellow card) 55'; Holt 59', 82'; Morison 63'	Report	Ameobi (yellow card) 40'; Ba 45+1', 71'; Gosling (yellow card) 57' (red card) 66'	Stadium: Carrow Road; Attendance: 26,816; Referee: Martin Atkinson

17 December 2011 16	Everton	1–1	Norwich City	Liverpool, Merseyside
15:00 GMT	Neville (yellow card) 78'; Osman 81'	Report	Naughton (yellow card) 4'; Holt 28'	Stadium: Goodison Park; Attendance: 31,004; Referee: Lee Probert

20 December 2011 17	Wolverhampton Wanderers	2–2	Norwich City	Wolverhampton, West Midlands
19:45 GMT	Zubar (yellow card) 30', (goal) 82'; Hunt (yellow card) 32'; Ebanks-Blake 37'	Report	Surman 12'; Naughton (yellow card) 39'; R. Martin (yellow card) 73'; Jackson 76'	Stadium: Molineux Stadium; Attendance: 27,067; Referee: Chris Foy

27 December 2011 18	Norwich City	0–2	Tottenham Hotspur	Norwich, Norfolk
19:30 GMT	Whitbread (yellow card) 69'	Report	Gallas (yellow card) 52'; Bale 55', 67'	Stadium: Carrow Road; Attendance: 26,807; Referee: Michael Oliver

31 December 2011 19	Norwich City	1–1	Fulham	Norwich, Norfolk
15:00 GMT	Jackson 90+4'	Report	Sá 7'	Stadium: Carrow Road; Attendance: 26,406; Referee: Howard Webb

2 January 2012 20	QPR	1–2	Norwich City	Hammersmith and Fulham, London
15:00 GMT	Barton 11', (red card) 36'; Helguson (yellow card) 45+1'; Wright-Phillips (yellow card) 65'	Report	Pilkington 42'; Ayala (yellow card) 53'; Morison 83'	Stadium: Loftus Road; Attendance: 18,033; Referee: Neil Swarbrick

14 January 2012 21	West Bromwich Albion	1–2	Norwich City	Sandwell, West Midlands
15:00 GMT	Long 68' (pen.)	Report	Surman 42'; Ayala (yellow card) 67'; Morison 79'	Stadium: The Hawthorns; Attendance: 22,474; Referee: Mike Dean

21 January 2012 22	Norwich City	0–0	Chelsea	Norwich, Norfolk
15:00 GMT		Report		Stadium: Carrow Road; Attendance: 26,792; Referee: Mark Clattenburg

1 February 2012 23	Sunderland	3–0	Norwich City	Sunderland, Tyne and Wear
20:00 GMT	Gardner (yellow card) 19'; Campbell 21'; Sessègnon 28'; Ayala 54' (o.g.)	Report	Naughton (yellow card) 90'	Stadium: Stadium of Light; Attendance: 34,476; Referee: Lee Mason

4 February 2012 24	Norwich City	2–0	Bolton Wanderers	Norwich, Norfolk
15:00 GMT	Surman 70'; Pilkington 85'	Report		Stadium: Carrow Road; Attendance: 26,358; Referee: Lee Probert

11 February 2012 25	Swansea City	2–3	Norwich City	Swansea, Wales
15:00 GMT	Graham 23', 87'	Report	Drury (yellow card) 43'; Holt 47', 63', (yellow card) 64'; Pilkington 51'	Stadium: Liberty Stadium; Attendance: 19,927; Referee: Martin Atkinson

26 February 2012 26	Norwich City	1–2	Manchester United	Norwich, Norfolk
13:30 GMT	Holt 83'	Report	Scholes 7'; Giggs 90'	Stadium: Carrow Road; Attendance: 26,811; Referee: Andre Marriner

3 March 2012 27	Stoke City	1–0	Norwich City	Stoke-on-Trent, Staffordshire
15:00 GMT	Etherington 83'	Report	E. Bennett (yellow card) 62'; Whitbread (yellow card) 78'; Naughton (yellow card) 90+3'	Stadium: Britannia Stadium; Attendance: 27,483; Referee: Michael Oliver

11 March 2012 28	Norwich City	1–1	Wigan Athletic	Norwich, Norfolk
16:00 GMT	Hoolahan 10', (yellow card) 55'; Holt (yellow card) 43'; Whitbread (yellow card) 61'; Drury (yellow card) 72'	Report	Moses 68', (yellow card) 90+3'; McCarthy (yellow card) 79'; Alcaraz (yellow card) 81'; McArthur (yellow card) 90+5'	Stadium: Carrow Road; Attendance: 26,653; Referee: Kevin Friend

17 March 2012 29	Newcastle United	1–0	Norwich City	Newcastle upon Tyne, Tyne and Wear
15:00 GMT	Cissé 11'	Report		Stadium: St James' Park; Attendance: 47,883; Referee: Phil Dowd

24 March 2012 30	Norwich City	2–1	Wolverhampton Wanderers	Norwich, Norfolk
15:00 GMT	Holt 26', 45+1' (pen.), (yellow card) 63' (red card) 85'; Whitbread (yellow card) 90'	Report	Jarvis 25'; Jónsson (yellow card) 45'; Johnson (yellow card) 63'	Stadium: Carrow Road; Attendance: 26,752; Referee: Mark Clattenburg

31 March 2012 31	Fulham	2–1	Norwich City	Hammersmith and Fulham, London
15:00 BST	Dempsey 2'; Duff 13'	Report	Wilbraham 77'	Stadium: Craven Cottage; Attendance: 25,700; Referee: Anthony Taylor

7 April 2012 32	Norwich City	2–2	Everton	Norwich, Norfolk
15:00 BST	Howson 39'; Holt 76'	Report	Jelavić 22', 61'	Stadium: Carrow Road; Attendance: 26,554; Referee: Andre Marriner

9 April 2012 33	Tottenham Hotspur	1–2	Norwich City	Haringey, London
15:00 BST	Defoe 33'	Report	Pilkington 13'; E. Bennett 66'	Stadium: White Hart Lane; Attendance: 36,126; Referee: Michael Oliver

14 April 2012 34	Norwich City	1–6	Manchester City	Norwich, Norfolk
12:45 BST	Surman 51'; Bennett (yellow card) 59'	Report	Tevez (yellow card) 9', (goal) 18', 73', 80'; Agüero 27', 75'; Nasri (yellow card) 43'; Johnson 90'	Stadium: Carrow Road; Attendance: 26,812; Referee: Chris Foy

21 April 2012 35	Blackburn Rovers	2–0	Norwich City	Blackburn, Lancashire
15:00 BST	Formica 41'; Hoilett 49'	Report		Stadium: Ewood Park; Attendance: 23,218; Referee: Kevin Friend

28 April 2012 36	Norwich City	0–3	Liverpool	Norwich, Norfolk
17:30 BST		Report	Suárez 24', 28', 82'	Stadium: Carrow Road; Attendance: 26,819; Referee: Mark Halsey

5 May 2012 37	Arsenal	3–3	Norwich City	Islington, London
12:45 BST	Benayoun 2'; Van Persie 72', 80'	Report	Hoolahan 12'; Holt 27'; Morison 85'	Stadium: Emirates Stadium; Attendance: 60,092; Referee: Anthony Taylor

13 May 2012 38	Norwich City	2–0	Aston Villa	Norwich, Norfolk
15:00 BST	Holt 9'; Jackson 22'	Report		Stadium: Carrow Road; Attendance: 26,803; Referee: Martin Atkinson

=== FA Cup ===
7 January 2012 Round 3	Norwich City	4–1	Burnley	Norwich, Norfolk
15:00 GMT	Holt 6'; Jackson 12'; Surman 60'; Morison 73'; Whitbread (yellow card) 79'; Ayala (yellow card) 84'	Report	Rodriguez 15'	Stadium: Carrow Road; Attendance: 22,898; Referee: Mike Jones

28 January 2012 Round 4	West Bromwich Albion	1–2	Norwich City	Sandwell, West Midlands
15:00 GMT	Thomas (yellow card) 30'; Fortuné 54'	Report	Holt 36', (yellow card) 60'; Martin (yellow card) 69'; Ayala (yellow card) 82'; Jackson 85'	Stadium: The Hawthorns; Attendance: 17,434; Referee: Michael Oliver

18 February 2012 Round 5	Norwich City	1–2	Leicester City	Norwich, Norfolk
15:00 GMT	Ward (yellow card) 17'; Hoolahan 23'	Report	St Ledger 5'; Morgan (yellow card) 37'; Nugent 71'	Stadium: Carrow Road; Attendance: 26,658; Referee: Mike Dean

=== League Cup ===
23 August 2011 Round 2	Norwich City	0–4	Milton Keynes Dons	Norwich, Norfolk
19:45 BST		Report	Chadwick 21', 60'; Baldock 28'; Williams (yellow card) 50'; Powell 68'	Stadium: Carrow Road; Attendance: 13,009; Referee: Mark Haywood
