= Andrew Crofts (footballer) =

Wales international footballer

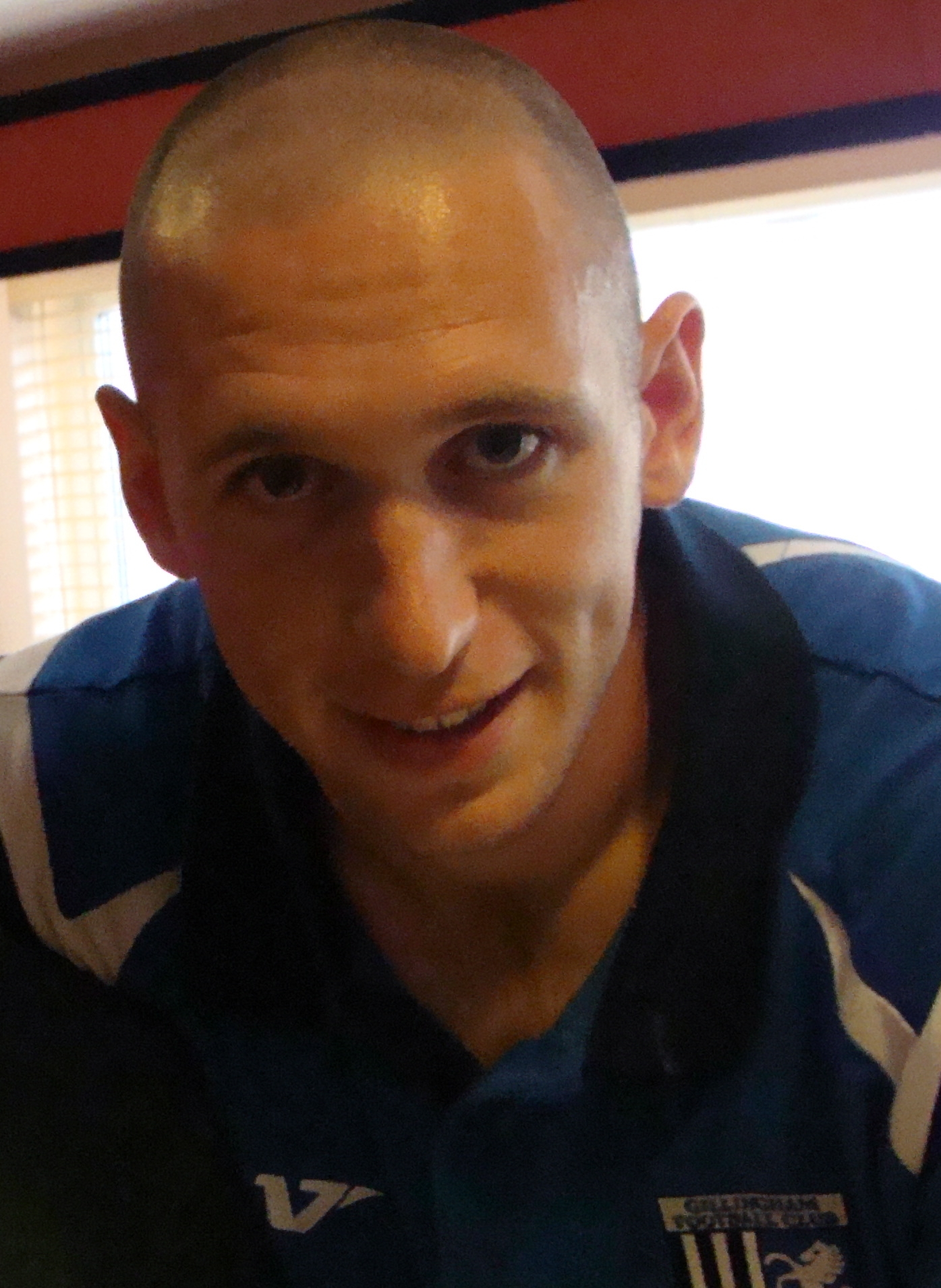
- Crofts with Gillingham in 2008

Personal information
- Full name: Andrew Lawrence Crofts
- Date of birth: 29 May 1984 (age 42)
- Place of birth: Chatham, Kent, England
- Height: 5 ft 9 in (1.75 m)
- Position: Midfielder

Team information
- Current team: Tottenham Hotspur (assistant head coach); Wales (assistant coach)

Youth career
- 1994–2000: Chelsea
- 2000–2001: Gillingham

Senior career*
Years	Team	Apps	(Gls)
2001–2009	Gillingham	174	(17)
2008–2009	→ Peterborough United (loan)	9	(0)
2009	→ Wrexham (loan)	16	(1)
2009–2010	Brighton & Hove Albion	44	(5)
2010–2012	Norwich City	68	(8)
2012–2016	Brighton & Hove Albion	71	(5)
2016	→ Gillingham (loan)	6	(0)
2016–2017	Charlton Athletic	46	(1)
2017	Scunthorpe United	4	(0)
2018–2019	Newport County	9	(0)
2019	Yeovil Town	0	(0)
2019–2021	Brighton & Hove Albion	0	(0)
Total		447	(37)

International career
2002–2004	Wales U19	8	(0)
2005–2006	Wales U21	10	(1)
2005–2017	Wales	29	(0)

Managerial career
- 2022: Brighton & Hove Albion (interim)
- * Club domestic league appearances and goals

Andrew Lawrence Crofts (born 29 May 1984) is a professional football coach and former player who is assistant head coach of Premier League club Tottenham Hotspur and assistant coach of the Wales national team. He made 29 appearances for Wales at international level.

A tough-tackling midfielder, Crofts started his career with Gillingham, for whom he made his Football League debut at the age of 16, and made over 190 appearances for the Kent-based club. He had loan spells at Peterborough United and Wrexham during the 2008–09 season and joined Brighton & Hove Albion in 2009. After a successful season at Brighton he transferred to Norwich City in 2010, before moving back to the South Coast club in 2012.

Crofts represented Wales, where one of his grandparents was born, at under-19 and under-21 level and won his first senior cap in 2005. In 2008, he won his 12th cap, breaking the record for the most international caps received by a Gillingham player.

He became the head coach of the Brighton Under-23s in June 2021 after spending a year as a player-coach of the academy. In September 2022, Crofts was made the interim head coach of the first team after the departure of Graham Potter. After the appointment of new head coach Roberto De Zerbi, Crofts stayed on the first team as assistant coach.

In July 2026, Crofts joined Tottenham Hotspur as assistant head coach to Roberto de Zerbi.

== Early life ==
Crofts was born in Chatham, Kent, and began playing competitive football at the age of six for a club in nearby Rainham. Between the ages of 10 and 15 he attended weekly training sessions organised by Premier League club Chelsea. He also tried out on two occasions for the English Schools Football Association's national schoolboy team, but was unsuccessful.

== Club career ==
=== Gillingham ===
In September 2000, Crofts joined Gillingham as a trainee and was a regular in the club's youth and reserve teams during the 2000–01 season. At the end of the season, shortly before his 17th birthday, he was a surprise inclusion in the first team squad for a match at home to Watford, and made his Football League debut as a late substitute, replacing Marlon King. The following season, he suffered a broken leg during a reserve team match and missed several months of the season. Although he returned to action in early 2002, his next appearance for the first team did not come until October, when he came on as a substitute in a League Cup match against Stockport County. This was to be his only senior appearance of the 2002–03 season. He finally secured a regular first team place towards the end of the following season, featuring regularly during March and April 2004.

Crofts was a first team regular in the 2004–05 season, making 27 Football League appearances, and scoring his first senior goal for the club in a defeat to Brighton & Hove Albion on 26 December. In January 2005, he signed a new contract designed to keep him at the club until 2009. He was omitted from the team for most of March and April, but was recalled for the last match of the season, in which a draw with Nottingham Forest led to the "Gills" being relegated from the Football League Championship, the second tier of English football, to Football League One, the third tier. In the 2005–06 season, he made the most appearances of any player in the Gillingham squad, missing only one of the team's 46 matches in League One. Although the team struggled in the league, finishing in the lower half of the table, they defeated Premier League team Portsmouth in the League Cup, with Crofts scoring the winning goal. The following season, he again made over 40 appearances and also scored eight goals, his best total for an individual season, but Gillingham again finished the season in the bottom half of the table. He made his 100th start for the club on 18 December 2006 in a match against AFC Bournemouth, and marked the occasion with a goal. At the end of the season, he won four awards at the club's Player of the Year event and was dubbed Mr Gillingham by then-manager Ronnie Jepson. He took over as team captain in the 2007–08 season, but it was an unsuccessful season for the team, who were relegated from League One. The following October he was stripped of the captaincy, which was instead given to Barry Fuller. Manager Mark Stimson stated that he felt that the captaincy might have been too much of a burden for Crofts, and had a negative effect on his form. Soon afterwards, the club made Crofts available for transfer.

==== Peterborough United and Wrexham (loans) ====
In November 2008, he joined Peterborough United on loan. Shortly after returning to Gillingham the following January, he went on a second loan period, this time to Wrexham until the end of the season. He made his debut on the same day in a 2–1 defeat to Burton Albion. Upon his return to Gillingham from his loan spell, he was released from his contract.

=== Brighton & Hove Albion ===
On 29 June 2009, Crofts agreed to join League One club Brighton & Hove Albion on a two-year contract. He made his debut for Brighton during the 1–0 home defeat to Walsall on 8 August 2009 and scored his first goal for Brighton during the 2–2 draw at Yeovil Town on 10 October 2009. Crofts was given the role of captain by new manager Gus Poyet before the 3–1 away victory at Southampton. Crofts was later confirmed as permanent captain at the beginning of January 2010.

=== Norwich City ===
On 21 May 2010, Norwich City announced the acquisition of Crofts from Brighton, for an undisclosed fee, believed to be in the region of £300,000. He became the club's first signing of the summer transfer window, signing a three-year deal at Carrow Road. On 6 August 2010, he scored a goal on his debut against Watford. He subsequently gained promotion to the Premier League with the "Canaries" in his first season at the club. He initially kept his place as a regular starter for Norwich in the top tier, but in the second half of the 2011–12 season he gradually fell out of favour at the club.

=== Return to Brighton & Hove Albion ===
Crofts was transferred back to Brighton for an undisclosed fee in August 2012.

==== Loan return to Gillingham ====
On 19 March 2016, Crofts re-joined Gillingham on loan until the end of the season.

=== Charlton Athletic ===
On 22 July 2016, Crofts signed a one-year contract with Charlton Athletic. He scored his first goal for Charlton in a 1–1 draw with Southend United on 31 December 2016. On 1 September 2017, the club announced that he had ended his contract by mutual agreement.

=== Scunthorpe United ===
Crofts signed for Scunthorpe United on 31 August 2017, signing a one-year contract with the North Lincolnshire-based club. On 18 May 2018, he was not offered a new contract,

=== Newport County ===
On 26 June 2018 Crofts signed for Newport County on a one-year contract. He made his Newport debut in a 3–0 defeat at Mansfield Town on 4 August. Crofts was a 90th minute substitute for Newport in the League Two playoff final at Wembley Stadium on 25 May 2019. He was released by Newport at the end of the 2018–19 season.

=== Yeovil Town and second return to Brighton & Hove Albion ===
In June 2019 Crofts joined Yeovil Town as a player-coach. On 27 July 2019, however, he left the club to rejoin Brighton & Hove Albion as a player-coach with the club's under-23 side. He played for Brighton U21s in the 2–0 away win over AFC Wimbledon in the EFL Trophy on 3 September 2019.

== International career ==
One of his grandparents was born in Wales so he was eligible to play in the Welsh national team, and after representing the country at under-19 and under-21 levels he won his first senior cap, in 2005. In 2008, he won his twelfth cap, breaking the record for the most international caps received by a Gillingham player. Crofts was selected for the Welsh national U-19 team in 2002. He made his debut team appearance in the Milk Cup tournament in Northern Ireland, but was forced to return home after suffering an ankle injury in the first match. In total he made eight appearances at under-19 level, including appearing in a second Milk Cup in 2003.

After moving up to the under-21 level Crofts was selected for the national U-21 team for the first time in a match against Germany in February 2005. He went on to gain 12 caps at this level, scoring one goal.

He made his debut in the Welsh national team against Azerbaijan on 12 October 2005, coming on as a substitute for Carl Fletcher. At the end of the 2005–06 season, as part of manager John Toshack's policy of introducing young players to the team, Crofts gained two further caps, both as a substitute, against Paraguay and Trinidad & Tobago, and also played in an unofficial international match against a Basque Country XI.

He was included in the starting line-up for an international for the first time in August 2007 when he played the full 90 minutes of a match against Bulgaria, but was back on the substitutes' bench for the UEFA Euro 2008 qualifying match against Germany the following month. He became established as a regular member of the Welsh squad during the UEFA Euro 2012 qualifying tournament.

== Coaching career ==
=== Brighton & Hove Albion ===
Crofts spent the 2020–21 season as a player-coach in Brighton's academy before, on 5 June 2021, becoming the head coach of the academy and ending his playing career. His first professional match as a manager came on 14 September, in a 1–0 away loss to Walsall in the EFL Trophy group stage. Crofts earned his first competitive victory as a manager on 2 November, in a 2–1 away win at Northampton Town in the EFL Trophy.

On 8 September 2022, he was appointed interim head coach of the Brighton first team after the departure of Graham Potter. After Roberto De Zerbi was appointed to replace Potter as manager, Crofts was appointed to the first team coaching staff. On 23 August 2024, Crofts was promoted to the position of assistant head coach, working under head coach Fabian Hürzeler.

=== Tottenham Hotspur ===
On 21 July 2026, he joined Tottenham Hotspur as assistant head coach, reuniting with Roberto de Zerbi after having spent time together at Brighton.

=== Wales ===
In August 2024 Crofts was appointed as assistant coach to Wales national team manager Craig Bellamy.

== Personal life ==
Crofts is a fan of Chelsea and at one time shared a flat with the club's future captain John Terry. During his time as captain of Gillingham, he was involved with a number of charity events, including acting as a celebrity waiter at a Gillingham pub and presenting a signed shirt to a brain damaged teenage fan. In January 2005, he dedicated a match-winning goal to his grandmother Lily, who had died several months earlier.

== Career statistics ==
=== Club ===
Appearances and goals by club, season and competition
Club	Season	League			FA Cup		League Cup		Other		Total	
Club	Season	Division	Apps	Goals	Apps	Goals	Apps	Goals	Apps	Goals	Apps	Goals
Gillingham	2000–01	First Division	1	0	0	0	0	0	0	0	1	0
Gillingham	2001–02	First Division	0	0	0	0	0	0	0	0	0	0
Gillingham	2002–03	First Division	0	0	0	0	1	0	0	0	1	0
Gillingham	2003–04	First Division	8	0	0	0	1	0	0	0	9	0
Gillingham	2004–05	Championship	27	2	1	0	0	0	0	0	28	2
Gillingham	2005–06	League One	45	2	1	0	3	1	2 (Note: Appearances in the Football League Trophy/EFL Trophy)	0	51	3
Gillingham	2006–07	League One	43	8	2	0	1	1	1	0	47	9
Gillingham	2007–08	League One	41	5	1	0	1	0	0	0	43	5
Gillingham	2008–09	League Two	9	0	1	0	1	0	0	0	11	0
Gillingham	Total		174	17	6	0	8	2	3	0	191	19
Peterborough United (loan)	2008–09	League One	9	0	0	0	0	0	0	0	9	0
Wrexham (loan)	2008–09	Conference Premier	16	1	0	0	0	0	2 (Note: Appearances in the FA Trophy)	0	18	1
Brighton & Hove Albion	2009–10	League One	44	5	5	2	1	0	0	0	50	7
Norwich City	2010–11	Championship	44	8	0	0	0	0	0	0	44	8
Norwich City	2011–12	Premier League	24	0	2	0	0	0	0	0	26	0
Norwich City	Total		68	8	2	0	0	0	0	0	70	8
Brighton & Hove Albion	2012–13	Championship	24	0	1	0	0	0	0	0	25	0
Brighton & Hove Albion	2013–14	Championship	23	5	1	1	0	0	0	0	24	6
Brighton & Hove Albion	2014–15	Championship	7	0	0	0	1	0	0	0	8	0
Brighton & Hove Albion	2015–16	Championship	17	0	1	0	0	0	0	0	18	0
Brighton & Hove Albion	Total		71	5	3	1	1	0	0	0	75	6
Brighton & Hove Albion combined total			115	10	8	3	2	0	0	0	125	13
Gillingham (loan)	2015–16	League One	6	0	0	0	0	0	0	0	6	0
Charlton Athletic	2016–17	League One	45	1	2	0	1	0	3	0	51	1
Charlton Athletic	2017–18	League One	1	0	0	0	1	0	1	0	3	0
Charlton Athletic	Total		46	1	2	0	2	0	4	0	54	1
Scunthorpe United	2017–18	League One	4	0	2	0	0	0	0	0	6	0
Newport County	2018–19	League Two	9	0	1	0	1	0	1 (Note: Appearances in EFL League Two play-offs)	0	12	0
Yeovil Town	2019–20	National League	0	0	0	0	0	0	0	0	0	0
Brighton & Hove Albion U23	2019–20	—			—		—		1	0	1	0
Brighton & Hove Albion U23	2020–21	—			—		—		2	0	2	0
Brighton & Hove Albion U23	Total		—		—		—		3	0	3	0
Career totals			447	37	21	3	13	2	13	0	494	42

=== International ===
Appearances and goals by national team, year and competition
National team	Season	Apps	Goals
Wales	2005–06	1	0
Wales	2006–07	3	0
Wales	2007–08	5	0
Wales	2008–09	3	0
Wales	2009–10	0	0
Wales	2010–11	3	0
Wales	2011–12	7	0
Wales	2012–13	2	0
Wales	2013–14	3	0
Wales	2014–15	0	0
Wales	2015–16	1	0
Wales	2016–17	0	0
Wales	2017–18	1	0
Wales	Total	29	0

== Managerial statistics ==
As of 6 September 2022

Managerial record by team and tenure
Team	From	To	Record							
Team	From	To	P	W	D	L	GF	GA	GD	Win %
Brighton & Hove Albion U23 (Note: Brighton & Hove Albion U23's statistics only include EFL Trophy matches as these are the only professional matches played at this level.)	5 June 2021	22 September 2022	4	1	1	2	5	6	−1	25.00

== Honours ==
=== Individual ===
- Brighton Player of the Season: 2009–10
- Gillingham Player of the Season: 2006–07
