= Josh Dawkin =

English-born Welsh footballer

Personal information
- Date of birth: 16 January 1992 (age 34)
- Place of birth: St Ives, England
- Position: Midfielder

Team information
- Current team: St Ives Town

Youth career
- 2007–2009: Norwich City

Senior career*
Years	Team	Apps	(Gls)
2009–2012	Norwich City	3	(0)
2011–2012	→ Kettering Town (loan)	12	(3)
2012	→ Cambridge United (loan)	5	(1)
2012–2013	Braintree Town	12	(0)
2012–2013	Lowestoft Town	15	(4)
2013–2014	Cambridge City	44	(17)
2014–2015	St Neots Town		
2016–	St Ives Town	37	(18)

International career^{‡}
2007–2009	Wales U17	9	(3)
2008–	Wales U19	6	(0)
- * Club domestic league appearances and goals as of 14:11, 14 April 2017 (UTC) ‡ National team caps and goals as of 08:00, 15 September 2010 (UTC)

Joshua George Dawkin (born 16 January 1992) is an English-born Welsh footballer who plays as a midfielder for St Ives Town, having signed for them in the summer of 2016.

== Career ==
Born in St Ives, Cambridgeshire, Dawkin has represented Wales at under-17 and 19 levels. Although born in England, he qualifies to play for Wales through his mother:

"My mum was born in Wales, though she only lived there for a couple of years because my grandad was in the RAF."

He made his professional debut for Norwich City aged 17, on 6 October 2009, in a match against Gillingham in the Football League Trophy.

Dawkin began a one-month loan spell with Conference National side Cambridge United on 9 March 2012.

On 12 July 2012 Dawkin joined Conference National side Braintree Town F.C. along with former Norwich City F.C. defender Sam Habergham.

After a spell with Cambridge City, Dawkin joined Southern Premier Division side Dunstable Town in the summer of 2014 following their promotion the previous season.

Spells followed for Biggleswade Town and St Neots Town, with whom Dawkin spent the second half of the 2015–16 season. In the summer of 2016 he moved to newly promoted Southern Premier Division side St Ives Town.

== Style of play ==
Dawkin expressed his strengths as a footballer as "running with the ball and dribbling", adding "I'm nowhere near as good as him but I'd like to model myself on Cristiano Ronaldo - I'd like to try and play like him."
