= Grant Holt =

English footballer (born 1980)

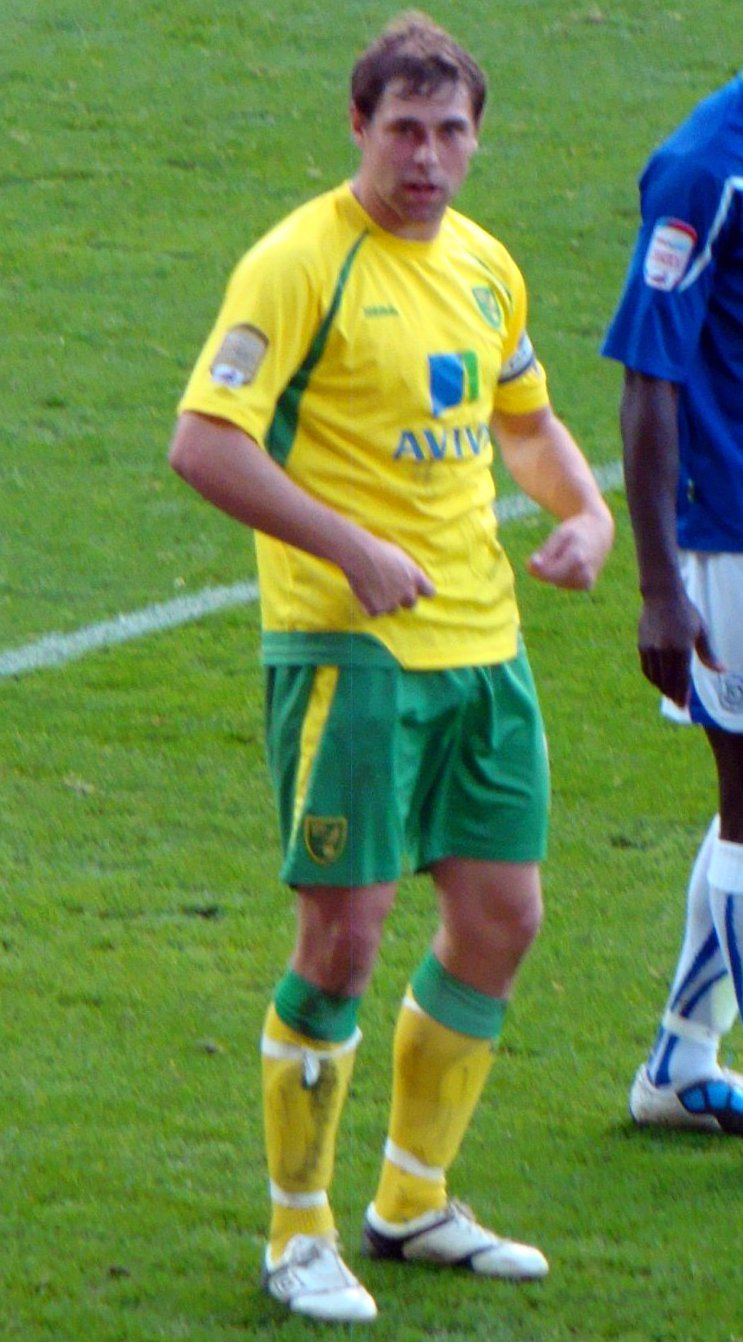
- Holt playing for Norwich City in 2010

Personal information
- Full name: Grant Holt
- Date of birth: 12 April 1981 (age 45)
- Place of birth: Carlisle, England
- Height: 6 ft 1 in (1.85 m)
- Position: Striker

Team information
- Current team: Dereham Town

Youth career
- Carlisle United

Senior career*
Years	Team	Apps	(Gls)
1999	Workington		
1999–2001	Halifax Town	6	(0)
2001	→ Sorrento (loan)		
2001	→ Barrow (loan)	10	(4)
2001	Sengkang Marine	17	(12)
2001–2003	Barrow	59	(31)
2003–2004	Sheffield Wednesday	24	(3)
2004–2006	Rochdale	75	(34)
2006–2008	Nottingham Forest	96	(21)
2008	→ Blackpool (loan)	4	(0)
2008–2009	Shrewsbury Town	43	(20)
2009–2013	Norwich City	154	(68)
2013–2016	Wigan Athletic	20	(3)
2014	→ Aston Villa (loan)	10	(1)
2014	→ Huddersfield Town (loan)	15	(2)
2015–2016	→ Wolverhampton Wanderers (loan)	4	(0)
2016	Rochdale	14	(2)
2016–2017	Hibernian	30	(5)
2017	King's Lynn Town	3	(1)
2017–2018	Barrow	24	(0)
2020–2022	Wroxham	3	(1)
2024–	Dereham Town		
- * Club domestic league appearances and goals

Grant Holt (born 12 April 1981) is an English professional footballer who plays for Dereham Town.

During his football career, Holt played as a forward for a number of non-league and professional clubs, making nearly 100 league appearances for Nottingham Forest before signing for Shrewsbury Town in 2008 where he became top goalscorer. A year later, he signed for Norwich where he won the Norwich City Player of the Year award in three consecutive seasons, helping Norwich to back-to-back promotions, and became the sixth highest goalscorer in their history. Following his retirement from football Holt became a professional wrestler, signing with the World Association of Wrestling.

== Playing career ==
=== Early career ===
Holt began his career as a youth player at his hometown club Carlisle United, but joined Workington after being released aged 18. Following success at Workington he signed for Halifax Town in the Third Division. He scored one goal for Halifax in the Football League Cup against Tranmere Rovers, and also went on loan to Australian club Sorrento for one month in 2001 and then to Barrow. He left in 2001 to play for the summer in Singapore with Sengkang Marine, under the understanding that he would be signed by Carlisle United on his return. However, Carlisle entered administration and were unable to complete the transfer. Holt moved back to Barrow, taking a part-time job in a factory in the town.

Holt spent two seasons at Barrow in the Northern Premier League. He had trials with full-time teams but did not get signed until 2003, when Sheffield Wednesday signed him in March 2003. He made 30 appearances, half of them as a substitute, but only managed four goals. Holt dropped down to League Two, signing for Rochdale, for whom he made 83 appearances and scored 42 goals. Holt views his time at Rochdale as his major break-through. Nottingham Forest paid £300,000 to secure his services in January 2006.

=== Nottingham Forest ===
Holt made a slow start to his time with Forest, scoring four times in as many months at the end of the 2005–06 campaign. In November 2006, he turned down a move to Bristol City for personal reasons, after the two clubs had agreed a fee. However, despite being on the bench for approximately half of Forest's matches in the 2006–07 season, he managed to score 18 goals in all competitions to become the club's top scorer. Forest fans recognised Holt's performances by handing him the 'Player of the Season' award.

In the summer of 2007, Holt and Forest boss Colin Calderwood reached an "uneasy truce" after the striker had a transfer request rebuffed, when Forest refused to give him an improved contract. Holt made it clear that he would be "happy to stay" with Forest for the 2007–08 campaign, while Calderwood admitted "he's not a player we want to see leave". However, Holt failed to impress by only scoring three times all season, although he played out of position as a winger for the majority of the season.

In March 2008, Holt signed on loan with Championship club, Blackpool, making his debut as a late substitute against Stoke City at the Britannia Stadium on 22 March. He made four substitute appearances before returning to Forest in the summer of 2008, saying he would like to stay and fight for his place in Forest's team next season, despite interest being shown from his home town club Carlisle United.

=== Shrewsbury Town ===
On 24 June 2008, Shrewsbury Town broke their club transfer record by signing Holt for £170,000. Holt opened his scoring account for the Shrews on his debut, scoring from the penalty spot against Macclesfield Town, in a game the Shrews won 4–0.

On 7 October 2008, in a Football League Trophy second round match against Wycombe Wanderers, Holt scored five goals in the Shrews' 7–0 win.

In the March 2009 edition of FourFourTwo, it was stated that Holt was the player to cover the greatest distance per game in both Leagues One and Two, averaging 4.8 kilometres per game. At the end of the season, Holt finished as joint-top scorer with Jack Lester for League Two, with 20 League goals, as well as, winning League Two Player of the Year, Shrewsbury Town Player of the Year and named in the League Two PFA Team of the Year for the 2008–09 season.

=== Norwich City ===
On 24 July 2009, Holt transferred to Norwich City after Shrewsbury Town accepted an undisclosed bid, thought to be £400,000. Holt signed a three-year contract with the option of a further year at Carrow Road.

Holt made his debut in the heavy 7–1 opening day defeat to Colchester United at Carrow Road, and scored his first Norwich goals with a hat-trick against Yeovil Town in a first round League Cup tie on 11 August 2009. His first league goals came with a brace against Wycombe Wanderers on 22 August 2009. Starting with that game, new manager Paul Lambert made Holt team captain. He won the League One Player of the Month award for October 2009, for "excellent performances throughout October", a month in which he scored "an impressive five goals in as many league fixtures". He reached the landmark of 20 goals for the season in the home game against Millwall on 26 December 2009. Holt received his first red card for Norwich City against Brentford on 23 January 2010. He finished the season winning the Norwich City Player of the Year award, having scored 30 goals in 44 appearances in total, as the club finished as champions of League One and earned promotion to the Championship.

Holt scored his first goals of the 2010–11 season in the League Cup first round against Gillingham, netting a brace. His first league goal of the season came during stoppage time in a 1–0 away win over Scunthorpe United on 14 August 2010. He scored his first league hat-trick against local rivals Ipswich Town on 28 November 2010.

During his time at Norwich he passed the landmark of 150 career goals with a penalty in the first minute in the 3–1 win over Bristol City. He reached the landmark of 50 goals for Norwich City on 2 April 2011 when he scored a hat trick in a 6–0 win against Scunthorpe United at Carrow Road. He was then nominated for the Championship Player of the Year in 2011, but was beaten by Adel Taarabt. He was the winner of Norwich's player of the season for a second consecutive year as the club were automatically promoted to the Premier League.

Holt started the first game of the 2011–12 Premier League season in Norwich's 1–1 draw at Wigan Athletic, partnering Steve Morison in attack, meaning he had played in all four English divisions. He scored his first Premier League goal in the third game of the season, scoring against Chelsea following an error by the goalkeeper Henrique Hilário. For the first part of the season Holt was used mainly as a substitute, becoming a regular starter again later in the campaign, scoring 15 league goals and being voted the player of the year for the third season in succession. He was inducted into the Norwich City Hall of Fame on 20 March 2012. Holt's impressive opening season in the Premier League earned him much acclaim by pundits and managers alike and even conjured talk of a possible place in Roy Hodgson's first England squad for the 2012 European Championship.

On 18 May 2012, Holt handed in a transfer request six days after being voted Norwich's Player of the Season for the third year running; the request was immediately rejected by Norwich City. On 1 June, Holt reiterated his request to depart Norwich City via his Twitter account, before signing a new three-year contract with the club on 3 July. He played in 34 league games during the 2012–13 season, scoring eight goals for the club as they again retained their place in the Premier League, including a goal in his final game for the club; a 3–2 victory against Manchester City at the Etihad Stadium.

=== Wigan Athletic ===
Holt joined Wigan Athletic on a three-year deal, on 8 July 2013, for an undisclosed fee believed to be in the region of £2 million. He made his Wigan debut on 3 August 2013 and scored in a 4–0 away win against Barnsley. He then scored a penalty in an eventual 2–2 draw with Middlesbrough.

On 14 January 2014, Holt joined Aston Villa on loan until the end of the 2013–14 season. Holt made his Aston Villa debut five days later, coming on as a substitute for Gabriel Agbonlahor in the 49th minute, in a 2–2 draw against Liverpool. Holt then scored his first Aston Villa goal, in a 2–1 loss against Fulham on 5 April 2014. Holt went to make ten appearances and score once before returning to Wigan at the end of the season.

On 27 September 2014, Holt joined Huddersfield Town on an initial emergency loan until 8 November 2014. Holt made his Huddersfield Town debut the same day, coming on as a substitute for Lee Peltier in the 64th minute, in a 2–1 win over Millwall. His first goal for the club came in their 4–2 win over Blackpool at the John Smith's Stadium on 18 October 2014. Following his first goal, Holt had his loan spell with Huddersfield Town extended until 28 December 2014.

On 28 December 2014, Holt returned to his parent club Wigan. This came after Holt had a successful operation on his knee, though it kept him out for nine months.

On 30 October 2015, he moved on loan to Championship side Wolverhampton Wanderers until 2 January 2016.

=== Later career ===
On 18 February 2016, Holt joined Rochdale until the end of the season. Holt then signed a one-year contract with Scottish club Hibernian in June 2016. He scored seven goals in 39 appearances for Hibs during the 2016–17 season, as the team won the 2016–17 Scottish Championship. Holt was released by Hibs in May 2017, at the end of his contract.

On 9 October 2017, Holt signed for Southern League Premier Division club King's Lynn Town, linking up with manager Ian Culverhouse, who had been assistant manager at Norwich City throughout Holt's time with the Canaries.

Less than a month later, his former club Barrow made an approach for him to join as a player-coach, with Holt moving to the club in the higher level National League.

On 16 July 2018, it was announced that Holt would be leaving Barrow.

He played three games for Wroxham in the 2019–20 Eastern Counties Football League and scored two goals, one of which was against South Normanton Athletic in the FA Vase. Holt made three more appearances for Wroxham in January 2022, playing in defence.

In February 2024, he was part of a consortium that formed a partnership with Dereham Town. As part of this, he was registered as a player.

== Coaching career ==
Holt's first coaching job was at Barrow, where he acted as a player-coach for the 2017–18 season.

In August 2018, Holt announced the end of his playing career and that he has accepted a coaching position with Norwich City, working with the academy. In December 2021, Holt left Norwich to take up a role as a scout with West Ham United.

Holt is also Director of Football at Langley School, Loddon.

== Career statistics ==
As of 30 December 2020

Appearances and goals by club, season and competition
Club	Season	League			National cup		League cup		Other		Total	
Club	Season	Division	Apps	Goals	Apps	Goals	Apps	Goals	Apps	Goals	Apps	Goals
Sheffield Wednesday	2002–03	First Division	7	1	0	0	0	0	—		7	1
Sheffield Wednesday	2003–04	Second Division	17	2	2	1	1	0	3	0	23	3
Sheffield Wednesday	Total		24	3	2	1	1	0	3	0	30	4
Rochdale	2003–04	Third Division	14	3	0	0	0	0	0	0	14	3
Rochdale	2004–05	League Two	40	17	3	5	1	1	1	1	45	24
Rochdale	2005–06	League Two	21	14	1	0	1	0	1	1	24	15
Rochdale	Total		75	34	4	5	2	1	2	2	83	42
Nottingham Forest	2005–06	League One	19	4	0	0	0	0	0	0	19	4
Nottingham Forest	2006–07	League One	45	14	4	1	1	0	4	3	54	18
Nottingham Forest	2007–08	League One	32	3	1	0	2	0	0	0	35	3
Nottingham Forest	Total		96	21	5	1	3	0	4	3	108	25
Blackpool (loan)	2007–08	Championship	4	0	0	0	0	0	—		4	0
Shrewsbury Town	2008–09	League Two	43	20	1	1	1	0	6	7	51	28
Norwich City	2009–10	League One	39	24	2	3	2	3	1	0	44	30
Norwich City	2010–11	Championship	45	21	1	0	2	2	—		48	23
Norwich City	2011–12	Premier League	36	15	2	2	0	0	—		38	17
Norwich City	2012–13	Premier League	34	8	1	0	3	0	—		38	8
Norwich City	Total		154	68	6	5	7	5	1	0	168	78
Wigan Athletic	2013–14	Championship	16	2	1	0	0	0	4	0	21	2
Wigan Athletic	2014–15	Championship	0	0	0	0	1	0	0	0	1	0
Wigan Athletic	2015–16	League One	4	1	0	0	0	0	1	0	5	0
Wigan Athletic	Total		20	3	1	0	1	0	5	0	27	3
Aston Villa (loan)	2013–14	Premier League	10	1	0	0	0	0	—		10	1
Huddersfield Town (loan)	2014–15	Championship	15	2	0	0	0	0	—		15	2
Wolverhampton Wanderers (loan)	2015–16	Championship	4	0	0	0	0	0	—		4	0
Rochdale	2015–16	League One	14	2	0	0	0	0	—		14	2
Hibernian	2016–17	Scottish Championship	30	5	5	2	1	0	3	0	39	7
King's Lynn Town	2017–18	Southern League Premier	3	1	0	0	—		1	0	4	1
Barrow	2017–18	National League	24	0	0	0	—		—		24	0
Wroxham	2019–20	ECFL Premier Division	2	1	0	0	—		1	1	3	2
Wroxham	2021–22	ECFL Premier Division	1	0	0	0	—		2	0	3	0
Career total			519	160	24	15	16	6	28	13	586	193

== Wrestling career ==
In May 2018, Holt signed a professional wrestling contract with WAW. He won his first fight when he was the last man standing in a 40-man Royal Rumble earning him the Crusher Mason Memorial Trophy. In total he wrestled three matches, the last in June 2019, and won all three of them.

== Personal life ==
Holt was born in Carlisle, Cumbria. He is married and has three daughters.

== Honours ==
Barrow

- Northern Premier League President's Cup: 2001–02

Norwich City

- Football League One: 2009–10
- Football League Championship runner-up: 2010–11

Hibernian

- Scottish Championship: 2016–17

Individual

- Nottingham Forest Player of the Season: 2006–07
- Football League Two Player of the Month: November 2008
- Football League Two Player of the Year: 2008–09
- PFA Team of the Year: 2008–09 League Two, 2009–10 League One, 2010–11 Championship
- Shrewsbury Town Player of the Year: 2008–09
- Norwich City Player of the Season: 2009–10, 2010–11, 2011–12
