= 2005–06 St Mirren F.C. season =

St Mirren
2005–06 season
- Chairman: Stewart Gilmour
- Manager: Gus MacPherson
- Stadium: Love Street
- Scottish First Division: Winners
- Scottish Cup: Quarter-finals
- League Cup: Second Round
- Challenge Cup: Winners
- Top goalscorer: League: John Sutton (14); All: John Sutton (17)
- Highest home attendance: 7,629 vs. Dundee, First Division, 15 April 2006
- Lowest home attendance: 725 vs. Stenhousemuir, Challenge Cup, 13 September 2005
Home colours

The 2005–06 season saw St Mirren compete in the Scottish First Division where they finished in 1st position with 76 points, gaining automatic promotion to the Scottish Premier League. St. Mirren reached the 2005 Scottish Challenge Cup Final where they beat Hamilton Academical 2–1.

== Fixtures and results ==
St. Mirren's score comes first

=== Scottish First Division ===
Match	Date	Opponent	Venue	Result	Attendance	Scorers
1	7 August 2005	Dundee	A	2–3	5,011	Kean, Baird
2	13 August 2005	Stranraer	H	0–0	2,614	
3	20 August 2005	St Johnstone	A	2–1	3,089	Kean, McGowne
4	27 August 2005	Brechin City	H	1–0	2,514	Kean
5	10 September 2005	Queen of the South	A	1–0	1,682	Lappin
6	17 September 2005	Clyde	H	2–0	3,068	Kean, Sutton
7	24 September 2005	Airdrie United	A	1–0	2,073	Adam
8	1 October 2005	Hamilton Academical	A	1–3	3,016	Kean
9	15 October 2005	Ross County	H	2–0	3,314	Sutton (2)
10	22 October 2005	Dundee	H	0–0	4,027	
11	25 October 2005	Stranraer	A	2–1	621	van Zanten, Kean
12	29 October 2005	Queen of the South	H	2–0	3,361	Potter, Kean
13	12 November 2005	Clyde	A	2–1	2,012	Sutton, Adam
14	15 November 2005	Brechin City	A	3–2	704	Sutton (2), Kean
15	26 November 2005	Hamilton Academical	H	2–1	3,195	Broadfoot, Lappin
16	29 November 2005	Airdrie United	H	1–1	2,931	van Zanten
17	3 December 2005	Ross County	A	4–0	3,393	van Zanten, Kean, Sutton, Murray
18	10 December 2005	Dundee	A	0–4	4,204	
19	17 December 2005	St Johnstone	H	0–0	3,145	
20	26 December 2005	Queen of the South	A	0–0	2,421	
21	31 December 2005	Brechin City	H	3–2	2,813	Adam, Kean, Corcoran
22	2 January 2006	Clyde	H	2–1	4,338	Kean, Corcoran
23	14 January 2006	Airdrie United	A	4–1	2,661	Corcoran, Anderson (2), McKenna
24	21 January 2006	Hamilton Academical	A	0–0	3,320	
25	28 January 2006	Ross County	H	0–1	3,656	
26	11 February 2006	St Johnstone	A	0–0	4,515	
27	18 February 2006	Stranraer	H	3–1	3,375	Anderson, Lappin, Sutton
28	11 March 2006	Queen of the South	H	1–0	3,436	Adam
29	18 March 2006	Clyde	A	1–0	2,275	Adam
30	21 March 2006	Brechin City	A	3–0	691	Sutton (3)
31	25 March 2006	Airdrie United	H	2–1	3,785	Sutton (2)
32	1 April 2006	Hamilton Academical	H	0–2	4,430	
33	8 April 2006	Ross County	A	2–0	3,588	Kean, Sutton
34	15 April 2006	Dundee	H	2–1	7,629	Broadfoot, Mehmet
35	22 April 2006	Stranraer	A	1–0	800	Mehmet
36	29 April 2006	St Johnstone	H	0–1	6,725	

=== Scottish Challenge Cup ===
Match	Date	Opponent	Venue	Result	Attendance	Scorers
First round	30 July 2005	Forfar Athletic	H	1–0	1,605	Reid
Second round	31 August 2005	Queen of the South	A	2–1	1,605	Corcoran, Murray
Quarter-finals	13 September 2005	Stenhousemuir	H	3–2	725	Adam, Lappin, Sutton
Semi-finals	27 September 2005	Greenock Morton	H	0–0 (4–2 p)	6,524	
Final	6 November 2005	Hamilton Academical	N	2–1	9,162	Lappin, Sutton

=== Scottish League Cup ===
Match	Date	Opponent	Venue	Result	Attendance	Scorers
First round	23 August 2005	St Johnstone	A	1–0	2,219	McGowne
Second round	20 August 2005	Motherwell	H	0–2	3,810	

=== Scottish Cup ===
Match	Date	Opponent	Venue	Result	Attendance	Scorers
Third round	7 January 2006	Motherwell	H	3–0	6,507	Potter, Adam (2)
Fourth round	5 February 2006	The Spartans	A	0–0	3,346	
Fourth round replay	14 February 2006	The Spartans	H	3–0	3,612	Sutton, Adam, Maxwell
Quarter-finals	25 February 2006	Gretna	A	0–1	2,850	

== Squad statistics ==
Pos.	Name	First Division		Scottish Cup		League Cup		Challenge Cup		Total	
Pos.	Name	Apps	Goals	Apps	Goals	Apps	Goals	Apps	Goals	Apps	Goals
GK	(England) Tony Bullock	12	0	3	0	0	0	0	0	15	0
GK	(Scotland) Craig Hinchliffe	3	0	0	0	1	0	1	0	5	0
GK	(Scotland) Chris Smith	21(2)	0	1	0	1	0	3	0	26(2)	0
DF	(Scotland) Kirk Broadfoot	25(2)	2	0	0	2	0	4	0	31(2)	2
DF	(Scotland) Ian Maxwell	16(5)	0	4	1	0	0	2	0	22(5)	1
DF	(Scotland) Kevin McGowne	32	1	4	0	2	1	3	0	41	2
DF	(Scotland) Andy Millen	27(1)	0	4	0	2	0	4	0	37(1)	0
DF	(Scotland) John Potter	35	1	4	1	2	0	3(1)	0	44(1)	2
DF	(Republic of Ireland) David van Zanten	31(1)	3	4	0	2	0	3	0	40(1)	3
MF	(Scotland) Charlie Adam	24(5)	5	4	3	0(1)	0	2(1)	1	30(7)	9
MF	(Scotland) Iain Anderson	5(6)	3	2(2)	0	0	0	0	0	7(8)	3
MF	(Scotland) Mark Corcoran	11(15)	3	3(1)	0	0(1)	0	2	1	16(17)	4
MF	(Scotland) Simon Lappin	33(2)	3	3(1)	0	2	0	3	2	41(3)	5
MF	(Scotland) David McKenna	0(2)	0	0	0	0	0	0	0	0(2)	0
MF	(Scotland) Craig Molloy	1(1)	0	0	0	0	0	0	0	1(1)	0
MF	(Scotland) Hugh Murray	27(2)	1	1(2)	0	2	0	4	1	34(4)	2
MF	(Scotland) Mark Reilly	11(3)	0	0	0	0	0	1(1)	0	12(4)	0
FW	(Scotland) John Baird	0(2)	1	0	0	0(1)	0	0(1)	0	0(4)	1
FW	(Scotland) Stewart Kean	29(6)	12	3(1)	0	1(1)	0	4	0	37(8)	12
FW	(Scotland) Brian McGinty	0(8)	0	0	0	0(1)	0	0(1)	0	0(10)	0
FW	(Republic of Ireland) Billy Mehmet	10(18)	2	0(2)	0	2	0	0(3)	0	12(23)	2
FW	(Scotland) Alan Reid	15(9)	0	1(1)	0	2	0	2(1)	1	20(11)	1
FW	(England) John Sutton	28(3)	14	3(1)	1	1	0	3	2	35(4)	17

== Team statistics ==
=== League table ===
Pos	Team	Pld	W	D	L	GF	GA	GD	Pts	Promotion, qualification or relegation
1	St Mirren (C, P)	36	23	7	6	52	28	+24	76	Promotion to the Premier League
2	St Johnstone	36	18	12	6	59	34	+25	66	
3	Hamilton Academical	36	15	14	7	53	39	+14	59	
4	Ross County	36	14	14	8	47	40	+7	56	
5	Clyde	36	15	10	11	54	42	+12	55	

Source: "2005-2006 First Division - SPFL Archive". SPFL.
Rules for classification: 1) points; 2) goal difference; 3) number of goals scored.
(C) Champions; (P) Promoted

== See also ==
- List of St Mirren F.C. seasons
