= 2012–13 Norwich City F.C. season =

Norwich City
2012–13 season
- Chairman: Alan Bowkett
- Manager: Chris Hughton
- Stadium: Carrow Road
- Premier League: 11th
- FA Cup: Fourth round
- League Cup: Quarter-finals
- Top goalscorer: League: Grant Holt (8); All: Grant Holt (8)
- Highest home attendance: 26,842 (4 May vs Aston Villa)
- Lowest home attendance: 26,072 (3 Nov vs Stoke City)
- Average home league attendance: 26,672
Home colours	Away colours

The 2012–13 season was the 111th season of football for Norwich City. It was Norwich City's second campaign in the Premier League since being promoted in the 2010–11 season. It was their 23rd season in the top flight of English football. During the season, they competed in the League Cup and the FA Cup exiting at the quarter final and fourth rounds respectively. During their FA Cup campaign Norwich became the first top flight club to lose to a non-league club since 1989 when they lost 1–0 at home to Luton Town in the fourth round. Sébastien Bassong was named player of the season.

== Club staff ==
=== Backroom staff ===
Position	Name
Manager	(Republic of Ireland) Chris Hughton
Assistant manager	(Scotland) Colin Calderwood
First team coach	(England) Paul Trollope
Reserve team manager	(England) Scott Marshall
Goalkeeping coach	(England) Dave Watson
Head of Strength and Conditioning	(England) Mike Watts
Sport Scientist	(England) Graham Stark
Academy manager	(England) Ricky Martin
Assistant Academy manager	
Academy goalkeeping coach	(Finland) Jani Viander
Under 14s coach	(England) Neil Adams
Performance and team analyst	(England) Donald Barron
Head of Physiotherapy	(England) Neal Reynolds
Physiotherapist	(England) Stuart Wardle
Club doctor	(England) Dr Nick Wiford
Chief scout	(Scotland) Ewan Chester

=== Board of directors ===
Position	Name
Chairman	(England) Alan Bowkett
Chief Executive	(England) David McNally
Joint Majority Shareholder	(England) Delia Smith (Wales) Michael Wynn-Jones
Directors	(England) Stephen Fry (England) Michael Foulger (England) Stephan Phillips

== Players ==
=== Squad ===
No.	Name	Nationality	Position	Date of birth (age)	Signed from	Signed in	Apps.	Goals
Goalkeepers
1	John Ruddy	(England)	GK	24 October 1986 (age 39)	Everton	2010	83 (0)	0
13	Declan Rudd	(England)	GK	16 January 1991 (age 35)	Academy (1999)	2008	11 (4)	0
28	Mark Bunn	(England) (Republic of Ireland)	GK	16 November 1984 (age 41)	Blackburn Rovers	2012	–	–
31	Jed Steer	(England)	GK	23 September 1992 (age 34)	Academy (2003)	2009	2 (0)	0
42	Lee Camp	(Northern Ireland) (England)	GK	22 August 1984 (age 42)	Nottingham Forest	2013	–	–
Defenders
2	Russell Martin	(Scotland) (England)	RB/CB	4 January 1986 (age 40)	Peterborough United	2010	109 (3)	7
3	Steven Whittaker	(Scotland)	RB	16 June 1984 (age 42)	Rangers	2012	–	–
5	Sébastien Bassong	(Cameroon) (France)	CB/LB	9 July 1986 (age 40)	Tottenham Hotspur	2012	–	–
6	Michael Turner	(England)	CB	9 November 1983 (age 42)	Sunderland	2012	–	–
18	Javier Garrido	(Spain)	LB	15 March 1985 (age 41)	Lazio (loan)	2012	–	–
20	Leon Barnett	(England)	CB	30 November 1985 (age 40)	West Bromwich Albion	2010	40 (4)	2
22	Elliott Ward	(England)	CB	19 January 1985 (age 41)	Coventry City	2010	54 (0)	1
23	Marc Tierney	(England)	LB	23 August 1985 (age 41)	Colchester United	2011	31 (2)	0
24	Ryan Bennett	(England)	CB	6 March 1990 (age 36)	Peterborough United	2012	8 (0)	0
33	George Francomb	(England)	RB	8 September 1991 (age 35)	Academy (2008)	2009	3 (0)	0
26	Daniel Ayala	(Spain)	CB	7 November 1990 (age 35)	Liverpool	2011	9 (1)	0
Midfielders
4	Bradley Johnson	(England)	CM	28 April 1987 (age 39)	Leeds United	2011	25 (4)	2
7	Robert Snodgrass	(Scotland)	LW/RW	7 September 1987 (age 39)	Leeds United	2012	–	–
8	Jonny Howson	(England)	CM	21 May 1988 (age 38)	Leeds United	2012	11 (0)	1
11	Andrew Surman	(England) (South Africa)	CM	20 August 1986 (age 40)	Wolverhampton Wanderers	2010	42 (7)	8
12	Anthony Pilkington	(Republic of Ireland) (England)	LW	6 June 1988 (age 38)	Huddersfield Town	2011	25 (7)	8
14	Wes Hoolahan	(Republic of Ireland)	AM	20 May 1982 (age 44)	Blackpool	2008	136 (21)	31
15	David Fox	(England)	CM	13 December 1983 (age 42)	Colchester United	2010	60 (7)	1
17	Elliott Bennett	(England)	RW/AM	18 December 1988 (age 37)	Brighton & Hove Albion	2011	24 (12)	1
21	Jacob Butterfield	(England)	AM	10 June 1990 (age 36)	Barnsley	2012	–	–
27	Alexander Tettey	(Norway) (Ghana)	DM	4 April 1986 (age 40)	Rennes	2012	–	–
32	Korey Smith	(England)	CM	31 January 1991 (age 35)	Academy (2007)	2008	61 (12)	4
–	Tom Adeyemi	(England)	CM	24 October 1991 (age 34)	Academy (2000)	2008	4 (9)	1
Forwards
9	Grant Holt (captain)	(England)	FW	12 April 1981 (age 45)	Shrewsbury Town	2009	115 (14)	70
10	Simeon Jackson	(Canada) (Jamaica)	FW	28 March 1987 (age 39)	Gillingham	2010	34 (33)	18
19	Luciano Becchio	(Argentina)	FW	28 December 1983 (age 42)	Leeds United	2013	–	–
25	Chris Martin	(England)	FW	4 November 1988 (age 37)	Academy (1998)	2006	82 (29)	32
–	James Vaughan	(England)	FW	14 July 1988 (age 38)	Everton	2011	1 (5)	0

Nationality: when 2 flags, 1st flag = country that plays for internationally, 2nd flag = country of birth
Apps/goals: statistics prior to 2012/13 season

== Transfers ==
=== In ===
Player	Moving from	Date	Contract	Transfer fee
(Scotland) Steven Whittaker (DF)	(Scotland) Rangers	June 30 2012	4-year	free
(England) Jacob Butterfield (MF)	Barnsley	July 6 2012	4-year	free
(Scotland) Robert Snodgrass (MF)	Leeds United	July 30 2012	3-year	undisclosed
(England) Michael Turner (DF)	Sunderland	July 31 2012	2-year	undisclosed
(Cameroon) Sébastien Bassong (DF)	Tottenham Hotspur	August 21 2012	3-year	undisclosed
(Norway) Alexander Tettey (MF)	(France) Rennes	August 26 2012	2-year	undisclosed
(England) Mark Bunn (GK)	Blackburn Rovers	August 29 2012	2-year	undisclosed
(Northern Ireland) Lee Camp (GK)	Nottingham Forest	Jan 23 2013	6-month	free
(Argentina) Luciano Becchio (FW)	Leeds United	Jan 31 2013	3½-year	player-swap

=== Out ===
Player	Moving to	Date	Fee	Apps	Goals
(Northern Ireland) Matt Ball (MF)	Stevenage	June 30 2012	released	0	0
(Wales) Josh Dawkin (MF)	Braintree Town	June 30 2012	released	3	0
(United States) Zak Whitbread (DF)	Leicester City	June 30 2012	released	48	1
(England) Aaron Wilbraham (FW)	Crystal Palace	June 30 2012	released	28	2
(England) Adam Drury (DF)	Leeds United	June 19 2012	free	362	4
(Wales) Andrew Crofts (MF)	Brighton & Hove Albion	August 2 2012	undisclosed	70	8
(Scotland) Simon Lappin (MF)	Cardiff City	January 21 2013	released	126	4
(Wales) Steve Morison (FW)	Leeds United	January 31 2013	player-swap	59	12

=== Loan ===
Date	Player	Loaned from/to	Expires	Notes
In
**16 August 2012**	**(Spain) Javier Garrido (DF)**	**(Italy) Lazio**	**30 June 2013**	**season-long**
1 September 2012	(England) Harry Kane (FW)	Tottenham Hotspur	1 February 2013	season-long, recalled (01/02)
30 January 2013	(Sierra Leone) Kei Kamara (FW)	(United States) Sporting Kansas City	6 May 2013	four-month
Out
**7 August 2012**	**(Spain) Daniel Ayala (DF)**	**Nottingham Forest**	**30 June 2013**	**season-long**
**24 August 2012**	**(England) James Vaughan (FW)**	**Huddersfield Town**	**30 June 2013**	**season-long**
**29 August 2012**	**(England) Tom Adeyemi (MF)**	**Brentford**	**30 June 2013**	**six-month, extended (29/01)**
31 August 2012	(England) George Francomb (DF)	AFC Wimbledon	5 November 2012	one-month, extended (04/10), (05/11)
15 September 2012	(England) Korey Smith (MF)	Yeovil Town	17 December 2012	three-month
26 October 2012	(England) Elliott Ward (DF)	Nottingham Forest	29 December 2012	two-month
8 November 2012	(England) Jacob Butterfield (MF)	Bolton Wanderers	5 January 2013	one-month, extended (10/12)
9 November 2012	(England) Jed Steer (GK)	Cambridge United	8 December 2012	one-month
15 November 2012	(England) Chris Martin (FW)	Swindon Town	2 February 2013	two-month, extended (07/01)
21 November 2012	(Scotland) Simon Lappin (MF)	Cardiff City	1 January 2013	six-week
**10 January 2013**	**(England) Elliott Ward (DF)**	**Nottingham Forest**	**30 Jun 2013**	**season-end**
16 January 2013	(England) Jacob Butterfield (MF)	Crystal Palace	17 March 2013	one-month, extended (19/02)
**29 January 2013**	**(England) Declan Rudd (GK)**	**Preston North End**	**30 June 2013**	**season-end**
**22 February 2013**	**(England) Chris Martin (FW)**	**Derby County**	**30 June 2013**	**one-month, extended (21/03)**
14 March 2013	(England) Leon Barnett (DF)	Cardiff City	24 April 2013	one-month, extended (12/04), recalled (24/04)
**15 March 2013**	**(England) Korey Smith (MF)**	**Oldham Athletic**	**30 June 2013**	**one-month, extended (15/04)**

Active loan deals in bold

== Statistics ==
Last updated on 20 May 2013

=== Appearances, goals and cards ===
No.	Pos	Player	Status	Premier League			FA Cup			League Cup			Total			Discipline	
No.	Pos	Player	Status	Starts	Sub	Goals	Starts	Sub	Goals	Starts	Sub	Goals	Starts	Sub	Goals	Booked	Sent off (straight red)
1	GK	(England) John Ruddy	HG	15	0	0	–	–	–	–	–	–	15	0	0	0	0
2	RB	(Scotland) Russell Martin	HG	30	1	3	2	0	0	1	0	0	33	1	3	2	0
3	RB	(Scotland) Steven Whittaker	PL	12	1	1	–	–	–	1	0	0	13	1	1	0	0
4	CM	(England) Bradley Johnson	HG	37	0	1	1	0	0	1	0	0	39	0	1	10	0
5	CB	(Cameroon) Sébastien Bassong	PL	34	0	3	–	–	–	1	0	0	35	0	3	3	0
6	CB	(England) Michael Turner	HG	25	1	3	–	–	–	2	0	0	27	1	3	6	0
7	RW	(Scotland) Robert Snodgrass	PL	35	2	6	1	0	1	2	0	0	38	2	7	8	0
8	CM	(England) Jonny Howson	HG	22	8	2	1	0	0	2	0	0	25	8	2	2	0
9	FW	(England) Grant Holt	HG	28	6	8	0	1	0	2	1	0	30	8	8	8	0
10	FW	(Canada) Simeon Jackson	HG	5	8	1	2	0	1	0	4	1	7	12	3	0	0
11	CM	(England) Andrew Surman	HG	4	0	0	1	0	0	2	0	0	7	0	0	0	0
12	LW	(Republic of Ireland) Anthony Pilkington	HG	25	5	5	0	1	0	1	1	0	26	7	5	2	0
14	CAM	(Republic of Ireland) Wes Hoolahan	PL	28	5	3	0	1	0	1	1	1	29	7	4	3	0
15	CM	(England) David Fox	HG	0	2	0	2	0	0	3	0	0	5	2	0	0	0
17	RW	(England) Elliott Bennett	HG	9	15	1	2	0	1	1	1	0	12	16	2	4	0
18	LB	(Spain) Javier Garrido (on loan)	PL	34	0	0	1	0	0	–	–	–	35	0	0	4	0
19	FW	(Argentina) Luciano Becchio	PL	2	6	0	–	–	–	–	–	–	2	6	0	0	0
20	CB	(England) Leon Barnett	HG	6	2	0	2	0	0	1	0	0	9	2	0	1	0
21	CAM	(England) Jacob Butterfield	HG	–	–	–	0	1	0	2	0	0	2	1	0	0	0
23	LB	(England) Marc Tierney	HG	1	0	0	1	0	0	4	0	0	6	0	0	0	0
24	CB	(England) Ryan Bennett	HG	10	5	1	2	0	0	3	0	0	15	5	1	2	0
27	CDM	(Norway) Alexander Tettey	PL	21	6	0	–	–	–	1	1	1	22	7	1	4	0
28	GK	(England) Mark Bunn	HG	22	1	0	–	–	–	3	0	0	25	1	0	3	1
31	GK	(England) Jed Steer	U21	–	–	–	–	–	–	–	–	–	–	–	–	–	–
33	RB	(England) George Francomb	U21	–	–	–	–	–	–	1	0	0	1	0	0	0	0
34	LW	(England) Joshua Murphy	U21	–	–	–	–	–	–	–	–	–	–	–	–	–	–
42	GK	(Northern Ireland) Lee Camp	HG	1	2	0	–	–	–	–	–	–	1	2	0	1	0
Players away from the club on loan:
13	GK	(England) Declan Rudd	U21	–	–	–	2	0	0	1	0	0	3	0	0	0	0
22	CB	(England) Elliott Ward	–	–	–	–	–	–	–	1	0	0	1	0	0	0	0
25	FW	(England) Chris Martin	–	0	1	0	–	–	–	2	0	0	2	1	0	0	0
32	CM	(England) Korey Smith	U21	–	–	–	–	–	–	–	–	–	–	–	–	–	–
–	CM	(England) Tom Adeyemi	U21	–	–	–	–	–	–	–	–	–	–	–	–	–	–
–	CB	(Spain) Daniel Ayala	–	–	–	–	–	–	–	–	–	–	–	–	–	–	–
–	FW	(England) James Vaughan	–	–	–	–	–	–	–	–	–	–	–	–	–	–	–
Players no longer at the club:
–	FW	(Sierra Leone) Kei Kamara (on loan)	PL	7	4	1	–	–	–	–	–	–	7	4	1	0	0
–	FW	(Wales) Steve Morison	–	4	15	1	–	–	–	3	0	1	7	15	2	0	0
–	FW	(England) Harry Kane (on loan)	–	1	2	0	1	0	0	1	0	0	3	2	0	0	0
–	LM	(Scotland) Simon Lappin	–	–	–	–	1	0	0	1	0	1	2	0	1	0	0

Status (Premier League eligibility):

HG = Home grown player named in 25 man squad
PL = Non home grown player named in 25 man squad
U21 = Under 21 players

Source: Premier League Squad list: Sept 2012, Feb 2013

=== Goalscorers ===
Rank	Pos.	Player	PL	FAC	LC	Total
1	FW	(England) Grant Holt	8	0	0	8
2	MF	(Scotland) Robert Snodgrass	6	1	0	7
3	MF	(Republic of Ireland) Anthony Pilkington	5	0	0	5
4	MF	(Republic of Ireland) Wes Hoolahan	3	0	1	4
5	DF	(Cameroon) Sébastien Bassong	3	0	0	3
5	FW	(Canada) Simeon Jackson	1	1	1	3
5	DF	(Scotland) Russell Martin	3	0	0	3
5	DF	(England) Michael Turner	3	0	0	3
6	MF	(England) Elliott Bennett	1	1	0	2
6	MF	(England) Jonny Howson	2	0	0	2
6	FW	(Wales) Steve Morison	1	0	1	2
7	DF	(England) Ryan Bennett	1	0	0	1
7	MF	(England) Bradley Johnson	1	0	0	1
7	FW	(Sierra Leone) Kei Kamara	1	0	0	1
7	MF	(Scotland) Simon Lappin	0	0	1	1
7	MF	(Norway) Alexander Tettey	0	0	1	1
7	DF	(Scotland) Steven Whittaker	1	0	0	1
Own goals			1	0	1	2
Totals			41	3	6	50

=== Captains ===
Player	PL	FAC	LC	Total
(England) Grant Holt	28	0	2	30
(Scotland) Russell Martin	9	2	0	11
(Republic of Ireland) Wes Hoolahan	1	0	1	2
(England) Jonny Howson	0	0	1	1

=== Penalties ===
Penalties Awarded
Date	Penalty Taker	Opponent	Scored?	Competition
28 Aug	(Republic of Ireland) Wes Hoolahan	Scunthorpe	✓	League Cup
9 Mar	(England) Grant Holt	Southampton	✗	Premier League
4 May	(England) Grant Holt	Aston Villa	✓	Premier League

Penalties Conceded
Date	Penalty Taker	Goalkeeper	Opponent	Scored?	Competition
18 Aug	(England) Steve Sidwell	(England) John Ruddy	Fulham	✓	Premier League
25 Aug	(France) Djibril Cissé	(England) John Ruddy	QPR	✗	Premier League
23 Sept	(Senegal) Papiss Cissé	(England) John Ruddy	Newcastle	✗	Premier League
31 Oct	(United States) Clint Dempsey	(England) Mark Bunn	Tottenham	✗	League Cup
1 Jan	(England) Mark Noble	(England) Mark Bunn	West Ham	✓	Premier League
2 Feb	(Morocco) Adel Taarabt	(England) Mark Bunn	QPR	✗	Premier League
17 Mar	(England) Craig Gardner	(Northern Ireland) Lee Camp	Sunderland	✓	Premier League
13 Apr	(Spain) Mikel Arteta	(England) Mark Bunn	Arsenal	✓	Premier League

== Pre-season ==
Note: this section relates to first team friendlies only.

21 July 2012	Norwich City	2–3	(Germany) Hertha BSC	Gleisdorf
17:00 BST	Vaughan 48', 58'	Report	Kachunga 12', 13', 51' (pen.)	Stadium: Solarstadion der Stadt

24 July 2012	Celtic (Scotland)	0–1	Norwich City	Glasgow
19:45 BST		Report	Holt 89'	Stadium: Celtic Park; Referee: Calum Murray (Scotland)

28 July 2012	Peterborough United	0–2	Norwich City	Peterborough
15:00 BST		Report	Morison 32'; Vaughan 86'	Stadium: London Road Stadium; Referee: Kevin Wright

31 July 2012	Norwich City	1–1	(Netherlands) Ajax	Norwich
19:45 BST	Pilkington 7'	Report	Schöne 30'	Stadium: Carrow Road; Attendance: 16,708; Referee: Mike Jones

3 August 2012	Milton Keynes Dons	0–0	Norwich City	Milton Keynes
19:45 BST		Report		Stadium: Stadium MK; Attendance: 4,814; Referee: Andy Woolmer

7 August 2012	Hull City	0–0	Norwich City	Kingston upon Hull
19:45 BST		Report		Stadium: KC Stadium; Referee: Mark Brown

11 August 2012	Norwich City	0–2	(Germany) Borussia Mönchengladbach	Norwich
15:00 BST		Report	De Camargo 17'; Hrgota 90'	Stadium: Carrow Road; Attendance: 13,324; Referee: Howard Webb

== Competitions ==
=== Overall ===
==== Competition record ====
Competition	Started round	Current position/round	Final position/round	First match	Last match	Record							
Competition	Started round	Current position/round	Final position/round	First match	Last match	P	W	D	L	GF	GA	GD	Win %
Premier League	—	—	11th	18 August 2012	19 May 2013	38	10	14	14	41	58	−17	26.32
League Cup	2nd round	—	Quarter-finals	28 August 2012	11 December 2012	4	3	0	1	6	6	+0	75.00
FA Cup	3rd round	—	4th round	5 January 2013	26 January 2013	2	1	0	1	3	1	+2	50.00
Total						44	14	14	16	50	65	−15	31.82

Updated to match played 19 May 2013
Source: Competitions

==== Summary ====
Clean sheets	12 (10 Premier League, 1 FA Cup, 1 League Cup)
Yellow cards	63 (60 Premier League, 1 FA Cup, 2 League Cup)
Red cards	1 (1 Premier League, 0 FA Cup, 0 League Cup)
Worst discipline	(England) Bradley Johnson (10 (yellow card) , 0 (red card) )
Biggest Win	4–0 vs West Bromwich Albion (H)
Biggest Defeat	0–5 vs Fulham (A), vs Liverpool (A)
Most appearances	(Scotland) Robert Snodgrass (40)
Top scorer	(England) Grant Holt (8)

=== Premier League ===
Norwich City's second season in the premier league started with a heavy defeat away to Fulham. Damien Duff, Alexander Kačaniklić both scored one, Mladen Petrić scored two and Steve Sidwell scored a penalty. Manager Chris Hughton said that Norwich simply didn't defend enough. Chris Hughton responded by signing defender Sébastien Bassong and defensive midfielder Alexander Tettey before the following game at home to QPR. Bassong and summer loan signing Javier Garrido made their débuts for the club in the match. Simeon Jackson opened the scoring and with Bobby Zamora scoring an equaliser. Djibril Cissé missed a penalty which was awarded following a coming together between Cissé and Bassong. The month ended with Norwich signing goalkeeper Mark Bunn from Blackburn Rovers.

==== League table ====
Pos	Team	Pld	W	D	L	GF	GA	GD	Pts	Qualification or relegation
9	Swansea City	38	11	13	14	47	51	−4	46	Qualification for the Europa League third qualifying round (Note: Swansea City qualified for the Europa League third qualifying round as the 2012–13 Football League Cup winners.)
10	West Ham United	38	12	10	16	45	53	−8	46	
11	Norwich City	38	10	14	14	41	58	−17	44	
12	Fulham	38	11	10	17	50	60	−10	43	
13	Stoke City	38	9	15	14	34	45	−11	42	

Source: Barclays Premier League
Rules for classification: 1) Points; 2) Goal difference; 3) Goals scored; 4) Play-offs (only if needed to decide champion, teams for relegation or teams for UEFA competitions).

==== Results summary ====
Overall								Home						Away					
Pld	W	D	L	GF	GA	GD	Pts	W	D	L	GF	GA	GD	W	D	L	GF	GA	GD
38	10	14	14	41	58	−17	44	8	7	4	25	20	+5	2	7	10	16	38	−22

Last updated: 19 May 2013.
Source: Premier League

==== Results by round ====
Round	1	2	3	4	5	6	7	8	9	10	11	12	13	14	15	16	17	18	19	20	21	22	23	24	25	26	27	28	29	30	31	32	33	34	35	36	37	38
Ground	A	H	A	H	A	H	A	H	A	H	A	H	A	A	H	A	H	A	H	H	A	H	A	H	A	H	H	A	H	A	A	H	A	H	A	H	H	A
Result	L	D	D	D	L	L	L	W	D	W	D	W	D	D	W	W	W	L	L	L	L	D	L	D	D	D	W	L	D	D	L	D	L	W	L	L	W	W
Position	19	16	15	16	17	18	19	15	16	14	15	13	13	13	12	11	7	9	11	11	12	12	13	14	14	14	12	13	13	11	14	13	14	13	14	15	12	11

Updated to match(es) played on 19 May 2013. Source: football365
A = Away; H = Home; W = Win; D = Draw; L = Loss

18 August 2012 1	Fulham	5–0	Norwich City	Fulham
15:00 BST	Duff 26'; Petrić 41', 54'; Kačaniklić 66'; Sidwell 87' (pen.)	Report		Stadium: Craven Cottage; Attendance: 25,062; Referee: Michael Oliver

25 August 2012 2	Norwich City	1–1	Queens Park Rangers	Norwich
15:00 BST	Jackson 11'	Report	Zamora 19'	Stadium: Carrow Road; Attendance: 26,317; Referee: Mark Clattenburg

1 September 2012 3	Tottenham Hotspur	1–1	Norwich City	London
15:00 BST	Dembélé 68'	Report	Snodgrass 85'	Stadium: White Hart Lane; Attendance: 36,142; Referee: Mark Halsey

15 September 2012 4	Norwich City	0–0	West Ham United	Norwich
12:45 BST		Report		Stadium: Carrow Road; Attendance: 26,806; Referee: Chris Foy

23 September 2012 5	Newcastle United	1–0	Norwich City	Newcastle upon Tyne
15:00 BST	Ba 19'	Report		Stadium: St James' Park; Attendance: 49,402; Referee: Neil Swarbrick

29 September 2012 6	Norwich City	2–5	Liverpool	Norwich
15:00 BST	Morison 61'; Holt 87'	Report	Suárez 1', 38', 57'; Şahin 47'; Barnett 68' (o.g.)	Stadium: Carrow Road; Attendance: 26,831; Referee: Mike Jones

6 October 2012 7	Chelsea	4–1	Norwich City	London
15:00 BST	Torres 14'; Lampard 22'; Hazard 31'; Ivanović 76'	Report	Holt 11'	Stadium: Stamford Bridge; Attendance: 41,784; Referee: Anthony Taylor

20 October 2012 8	Norwich City	1–0	Arsenal	Norwich
17:30 BST	Holt 19'	Report		Stadium: Carrow Road; Attendance: 26,825; Referee: Lee Probert

27 October 2012 9	Aston Villa	1–1	Norwich City	Birmingham
12:45 GMT	Benteke 23'	Report	Turner 79'	Stadium: Villa Park; Attendance: 33,184; Referee: Phil Dowd

3 November 2012 10	Norwich City	1–0	Stoke City	Norwich
15:00 GMT	Johnson 44'	Report		Stadium: Carrow Road; Attendance: 26,072; Referee: Andre Marriner

10 November 2012 11	Reading	0–0	Norwich City	Reading
15:00 GMT		Report		Stadium: Madejski Stadium; Attendance: 24,080; Referee: Chris Foy

17 November 2012 12	Norwich City	1–0	Manchester United	Norwich
17:30 GMT	Pilkington 60'	Report		Stadium: Carrow Road; Attendance: 26,840; Referee: Anthony Taylor

24 November 2012 13	Everton	1–1	Norwich City	Liverpool
15:00 GMT	Naismith 12'	Report	Bassong 90'	Stadium: Goodison Park; Attendance: 34,502; Referee: Mike Jones

28 November 2012 14	Southampton	1–1	Norwich City	Southampton
19:45 GMT	Lambert 32'	Report	Snodgrass 45'	Stadium: St Mary's Stadium; Attendance: 29,325; Referee: Mark Clattenburg

2 December 2012 15	Norwich City	2–1	Sunderland	Norwich
16:00 GMT	Bassong 8'; Pilkington 37'	Report	Gardner 44'	Stadium: Carrow Road; Attendance: 26,228; Referee: Phil Dowd

8 December 2012 16	Swansea City	3–4	Norwich City	Swansea
15:00 GMT	Michu 51', 90+2'; De Guzmán 59'	Report	Whittaker 16'; Bassong 40'; Holt 44'; Snodgrass 77'	Stadium: Liberty Stadium; Attendance: 20,294; Referee: Howard Webb

15 December 2012 17	Norwich City	2–1	Wigan Athletic	Norwich
15:00 GMT	Pilkington 16'; Hoolahan 64'	Report	Maloney 51'	Stadium: Carrow Road; Attendance: 26,677; Referee: Lee Probert

22 December 2012 18	West Bromwich Albion	2–1	Norwich City	West Bromwich
15:00 GMT	Gera 43'; Lukaku 82'	Report	Snodgrass 23'	Stadium: The Hawthorns; Attendance: 25,799; Referee: Martin Atkinson

26 December 2012 19	Norwich City	0–1	Chelsea	Norwich
15:00 GMT		Report	Mata 38'	Stadium: Carrow Road; Attendance: 26,381; Referee: Jonathan Moss

29 December 2012 20	Norwich City	3–4	Manchester City	Norwich
15:00 GMT	Pilkington 15'; R. Martin 63', 75'	Report	Džeko 2', 4'; Agüero 50'; Bunn 67' (o.g.)	Stadium: Carrow Road; Attendance: 26,827; Referee: Mike Jones

1 January 2013 21	West Ham United	2–1	Norwich City	London
15:00 GMT	Noble 3' (pen.); O'Brien 26'	Report	R. Martin 90'	Stadium: Boleyn Ground; Attendance: 35,005; Referee: Mark Clattenburg

12 January 2013 22	Norwich City	0–0	Newcastle United	Norwich
15:00 GMT		Report		Stadium: Carrow Road; Attendance: 26,752; Referee: Anthony Taylor

19 January 2013 23	Liverpool	5–0	Norwich City	Liverpool
15:00 GMT	Henderson 26'; Suárez 36'; Sturridge 59'; Gerrard 66'; R. Bennett 74' (o.g.)	Report		Stadium: Anfield; Attendance: 44,901; Referee: Michael Oliver

30 January 2013 24	Norwich City	1–1	Tottenham Hotspur	Norwich
19:45 GMT	Hoolahan 32'	Report	Bale 80'	Stadium: Carrow Road; Attendance: 26,818; Referee: Neil Swarbrick

2 February 2013 25	Queens Park Rangers	0–0	Norwich City	Shepherd's Bush
12:45 GMT		Report		Stadium: Loftus Road; Attendance: 17,543; Referee: Jonathan Moss

9 February 2013 26	Norwich City	0–0	Fulham	Norwich
15:00 GMT		Report		Stadium: Carrow Road; Attendance: 26,816; Referee: Howard Webb

23 February 2013 27	Norwich City	2–1	Everton	Norwich
15:00 GMT	Kamara 84'; Holt 90'	Report	Osman 39'	Stadium: Carrow Road; Attendance: 26,828; Referee: Lee Mason

2 March 2013 28	Manchester United	4–0	Norwich City	Trafford
15:00 GMT	Kagawa 45', 76', 87'; Rooney 90'	Report		Stadium: Old Trafford; Attendance: 75,586; Referee: Neil Swarbrick

9 March 2013 29	Norwich City	0–0	Southampton	Norwich
15:00 GMT		Report		Stadium: Carrow Road; Attendance: 26,783; Referee: Mark Clattenburg

17 March 2013 30	Sunderland	1–1	Norwich City	Sunderland
13:30 GMT	Gardner 40' (pen.)	Report	Hoolahan 26'	Stadium: Stadium of Light; Attendance: 38,625; Referee: Chris Foy

30 March 2013 31	Wigan Athletic	1–0	Norwich City	Wigan
15:00 BST	Koné 81'	Report		Stadium: DW Stadium; Attendance: 17,784; Referee: Mark Halsey

6 April 2013 32	Norwich City	2–2	Swansea City	Norwich
15:00 BST	Snodgrass 40'; Turner 60'	Report	Michu 35'; Moore 75'	Stadium: Carrow Road; Attendance: 26,372; Referee: Michael Oliver

13 April 2013 33	Arsenal	3–1	Norwich City	Islington
15:00 BST	Arteta 85' (pen.); Giroud 88'; Podolski 90'	Report	Turner 56'	Stadium: Emirates Stadium; Attendance: Mike Jones; Referee: 60,095

20 April 2013 34	Norwich City	2–1	Reading	Norwich
15:00 BST	R. Bennett 50'; E. Bennett 52'	Report	McCleary 72'	Stadium: Carrow Road; Attendance: 26,460; Referee: Mike Dean

27 April 2013 35	Stoke City	1–0	Norwich City	Stoke On Trent
15:00 BST	Adam 46'	Report		Stadium: Britannia Stadium; Attendance: 27,488; Referee: Anthony Taylor

4 May 2013 36	Norwich City	1–2	Aston Villa	Norwich
15:00 BST	Holt 74' (pen.)	Report	Agbonlahor 55', 89'	Stadium: Carrow Road; Attendance: 26,842; Referee: Kevin Friend

12 May 2013 37	Norwich City	4–0	West Bromwich Albion	Norwich
15:00 BST	Snodgrass 25'; Holt 62'; McAuley 65' (o.g.); Howson 90'	Report		Stadium: Carrow Road; Attendance: 26,837; Referee: Howard Webb

19 May 2013 38	Manchester City	2–3	Norwich City	Manchester
16:00 BST	Rodwell 29', 59'	Report	Pilkington 26'; Holt 54'; Howson 65'	Stadium: Etihad Stadium; Attendance: 47,054; Referee: Mark Halsey

=== FA Cup ===
5 January 2013 R3	Peterborough United	0–3	Norwich City	Peterborough
15:00 GMT		Report	E. Bennett 30'; Jackson 41'; Snodgrass 70'	Stadium: London Road, Peterborough; Attendance: 13,198; Referee: Stuart Attwell

26 January 2013 R4	Norwich City	0–1	Luton Town	Norwich
15:00 GMT		Report	Rendell 80'	Stadium: Carrow Road; Attendance: 26,521; Referee: Andre Marriner

=== League Cup ===
28 August 2012 R2	Norwich City	2–1	Scunthorpe United	Norwich
19:45 BST	Lappin 32'; Hoolahan 56' (pen.)	Report	Duffy 34'	Stadium: Carrow Road; Attendance: 13,116; Referee: Philip Gibbs

26 September 2012 R3	Norwich City	1–0	Doncaster Rovers	Norwich
19:45 BST	Tettey 26'	Report		Stadium: Carrow Road; Attendance: 13,902; Referee: Darren Deadman

31 October 2012 R4	Norwich City	2–1	Tottenham Hotspur	Norwich
19:45 GMT	Vertonghen 84' (o.g.); Jackson 87'	Report	Bale 66'	Stadium: Carrow Road; Attendance: 16,465; Referee: Jonathan Moss

11 December 2012 QF	Norwich City	1–4	Aston Villa	Norwich
19:45 GMT	Morison 19'	Report	Holman 21'; Weimann 79', 85'; Benteke 90'	Stadium: Carrow Road; Attendance: 26,142; Referee: Michael Oliver
