= Simon Lappin =

Scottish footballer

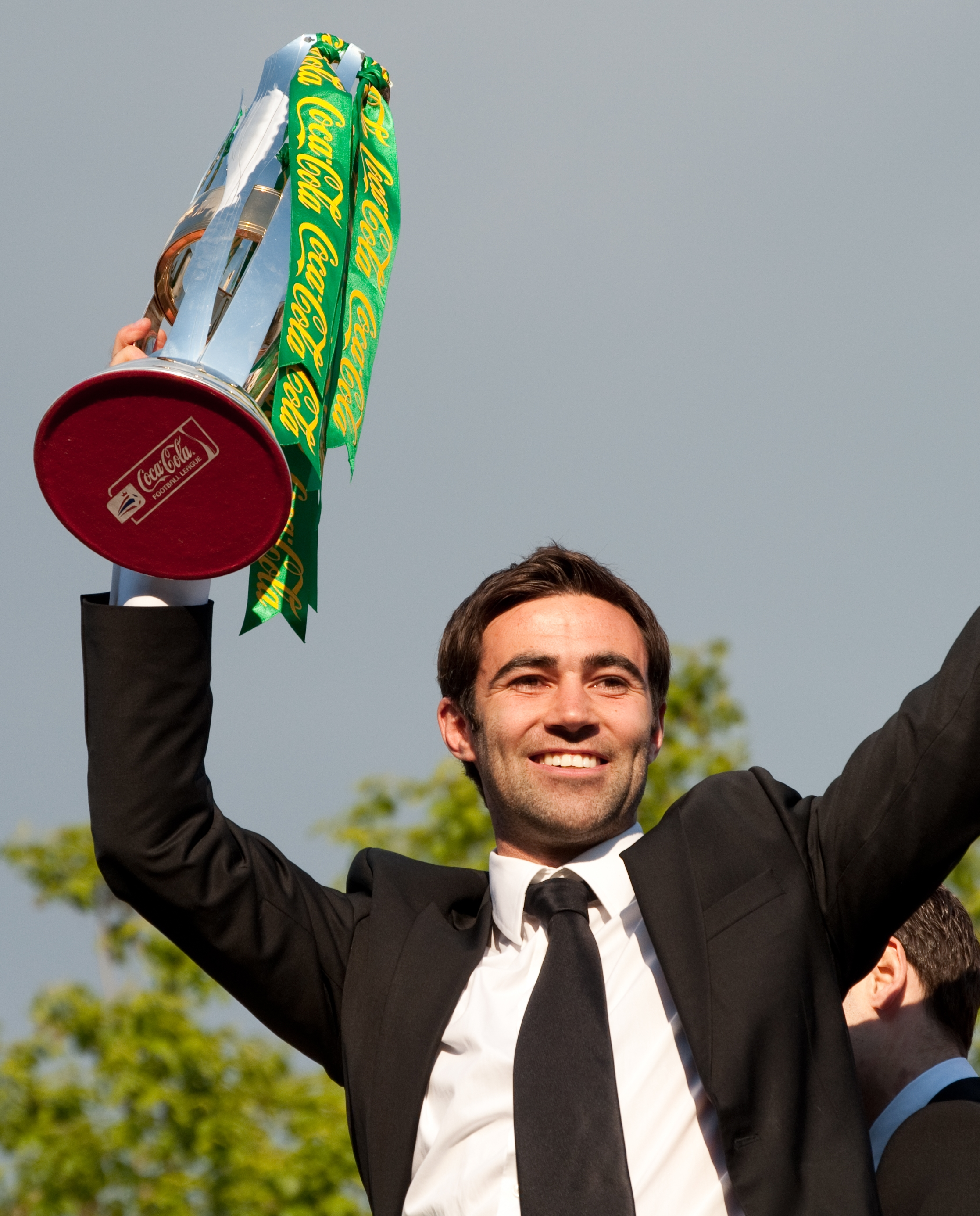
- Lappin celebrating promotion to the Championship with Norwich City in 2010

Personal information
- Full name: Simon Lappin
- Date of birth: 25 January 1983 (age 43)
- Place of birth: Glasgow, Scotland
- Height: 5 ft 11 in (1.80 m)
- Positions: Defender; winger

Team information
- Current team: Wroxham

Youth career
- –2001: St Mirren

Senior career*
Years	Team	Apps	(Gls)
2001–2007	St Mirren	152	(9)
2007–2013	Norwich City	109	(2)
2008	→ Motherwell (loan)	14	(2)
2012–2013	→ Cardiff City (loan)	2	(0)
2013–2014	Cardiff City	0	(0)
2013–2014	→ Sheffield United (loan)	9	(0)
2014–2016	St Johnstone	50	(3)
2016–2017	York City	7	(0)
2017–2018	King's Lynn Town	30	(3)
2018–2019	Wroxham	25	(5)
Total		398	(24)

International career
2001	Scotland U19	4	(0)
2002–2003	Scotland U20	2	(1)
2004–2005	Scotland U21	10	(0)
- * Club domestic league appearances and goals as of 8 September 2023 (UTC)

Simon Lappin (born 25 January 1983) is a Scottish former professional footballer who played as a left back and as a left winger during his career.

Lappin began his career with St Mirren before moving to Norwich City in 2007. He had short loan spells at Motherwell and Cardiff City before moving to Cardiff permanently in 2013. He had a loan spell with Sheffield United, before playing for St Johnstone from 2014 to 2016. Lappin played for National League club York City from 2016 to 2017. He was capped 10 times by the Scotland national under-21 team.

== Early life ==
Lappin was born in Glasgow and began his career in St Mirren's youth system, signing a professional contract in July 1999.

== Club career ==
=== St Mirren ===
Lappin was an unused substitute in several games during St Mirren's 2000–01 Scottish Premier League campaign. After relegation that season he was fast-tracked into the first team where his crosses from the left, both in open play and from set pieces led to a number of goals for teammates. He made the first of his ten Scotland Under-21 appearances during 2003–04 the season and helped the club gain promotion to the Scottish Premier League for 2006–07, after which he signed a two-year contract extension. He also scored one of St Mirren's goals as they defeated Hamilton Academical 2–1 in the 2005 Scottish Challenge Cup final. Lappin made more than 170 appearances for the Buddies before he was signed by Norwich City manager Peter Grant.

=== Norwich City ===
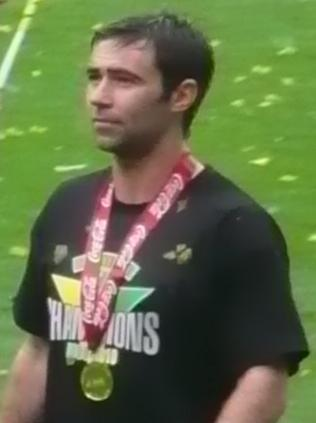
Lappin celebrating promotion to the Championship with Norwich City in 2010

On 31 January 2007, Lappin signed a two-and-a-half-year contract with Norwich City for a £100,000 fee. He made his debut for Norwich on 3 February at Carrow Road in a 2–1 win against Leeds United, in which he earned the official sponsor's Man of the Match award. Lappin then scored his first goal for Norwich against Luton Town on 27 February. City were awarded a free-kick in the 90th minute of the game at Kenilworth Road, with the scores level at 2–2, when Lappin curled in a match-winning goal. Lappin played in most of Norwich City's games under Peter Grant in 2007–08, but when Grant was replaced by Glenn Roeder Lappin found himself out of favour after a 3–0 defeat to Plymouth Argyle. Lappin was one of six players criticised by Roeder after a 5–1 reserve-team defeat to Ipswich Town.

Lappin was loaned to Motherwell for the rest of 2007–08 on 31 January 2008. During this spell, he played 15 matches and scored two goals, including the only goal of the game in Motherwell's shock 1–0 win against Celtic at Celtic Park. Lappin remained at Norwich and despite the club's poor start to 2008–09, he still failed to get near the first team, even being made to train with the youths by Roeder. Many Norwich fans felt Lappin was being badly treated and should have been recalled to the team. After Bryan Gunn's appointment as Norwich manager, Lappin made his first appearance for Norwich's first team in 16 months on 21 March 2009, in a 1–1 draw against Birmingham City at St Andrew's. Although his performances were not enough to prevent the club being relegated to League One, Lappin signed a two-year contract extension with the club in June 2009.

When Paul Lambert took over as Norwich manager early in 2009–10, Lappin began to feature more regularly and ended up starting 42 league games, more than any other player, even captaining the side in a Football League Trophy match with Brentford when Grant Holt and Gary Doherty were both absent. Lappin continued to play a prominent role in the Norwich City side during 2010–11, signing another two-year contract extension in January 2011. He was rushed into hospital on 19 February suffering with appendicitis and was ruled out of playing for a number of weeks.

By the start of 2011–12, players such as Andrew Surman and Elliott Bennett were regular choices, which resulted in Lappin only making four Premier League appearances, along with two substitute appearances in cup competitions. This included deputising at left back for the last two matches following injuries to both Marc Tierney and Adam Drury.

At the start of 2012–13, Lappin scored his first goal for the club in over five years in a League Cup tie against Scunthorpe United, beating Sam Slocombe with a powerful effort from the edge of the box. He made his last appearance for the club on 5 January 2013, in a 3–0 win over Peterborough United in the third round of the FA Cup.

=== Cardiff City ===
In November 2012, Lappin moved to Cardiff City on an emergency loan until 1 January 2013. He made his debut for the club in a 2–1 victory at Barnsley, but was sent off after picking up two yellow cards, the first Cardiff player to be dismissed in over a year. Following Andrew Taylor's return to the side, Lappin was restricted to appearances on the bench, ensuring his second appearance for the Bluebirds didn't come until New Years Day in a 1–0 win at Birmingham City, which was his last before returning to Norwich the next day.

In January 2013, Lappin was announced as a Cardiff player having left Norwich by mutual consent earlier in the month. In October 2013, Lappin signed for League One club Sheffield United on a one-month loan. Having made five appearances for the South Yorkshire club in his first month, Lappin agreed to extend his stay until January 2014. With his loan deal close to ending, Manager Nigel Clough insisted he would be willing to extend Lappin's loan spell until the end of the season.

Following his loan spell at Sheffield United, Lappin never played for Cardiff again and at the end of the season, was released upon expiry of his contract.

=== St Johnstone ===
After leaving Cardiff, Lappin was reported to be on trial with Rangers in August 2014, however this was denied by Rangers manager Ally McCoist. Lappin then signed a two-year contract with St Johnstone. Upon signing, St Johnstone manager Tommy Wright said that the club had signed Lappin ahead of other clubs who were interested, including one in Major League Soccer in America.

Lappin made his St Johnstone debut on 23 August 2014, coming on as a substitute for Scott Brown in the 72nd minute, in a 1–0 win over Aberdeen.

=== Later career ===
On 16 November 2016, Lappin signed for National League club York City on a contract until the end of 2016–17. He was released at the end of the season, with the possibility of returning once recovering from a ruptured Achilles.

Lappin signed for Southern League Premier Division club King's Lynn Town on 9 October 2017. He made his debut the following day, as an 81st-minute substitute in a 2–0 home win over Hitchin Town.

Ahead of the 2018–19 season, Lappin joined Wroxham as a player coach.

== International career ==
Lappin was capped four times by the Scotland national under-19 team (2001), two times by the under-20 team (2002 to 2003) and ten times by the under-21 team (2004 to 2005).

== Career statistics ==
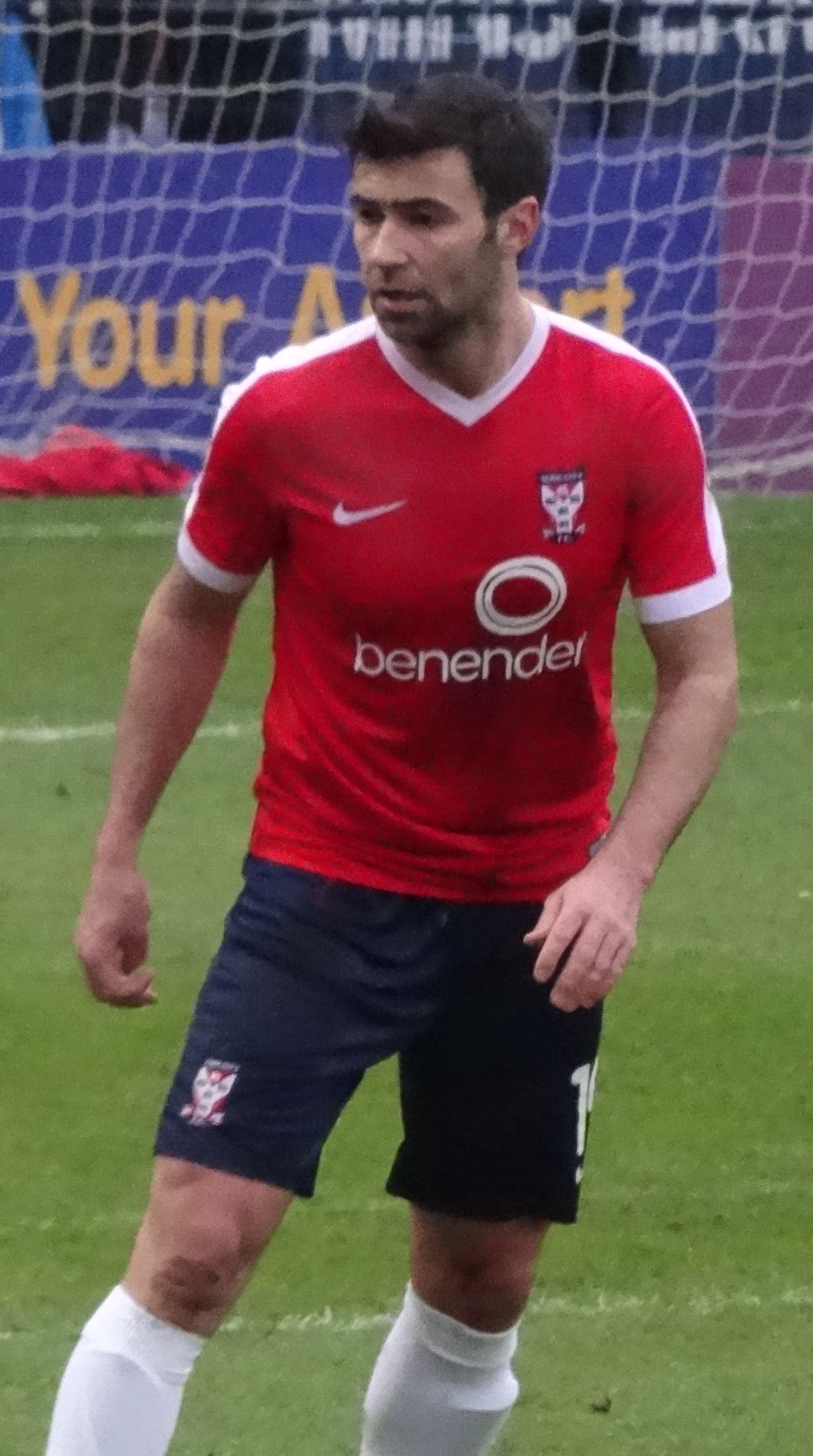
Lappin playing for York City in 2017

As of match played 7 April 2018

Appearances and goals by club, season and competition
Club	Season	League			National Cup (Note: Appearances in Scottish Cup and FA Cup)		League Cup (Note: Appearances in Scottish League Cup and League Cup)		Other		Total	
Club	Season	Division	Apps	Goals	Apps	Goals	Apps	Goals	Apps	Goals	Apps	Goals
St Mirren	2001–02	Scottish First Division	1	0	0	0	0	0	0	0	1	0
St Mirren	2002–03	Scottish First Division	34	0	1	0	2	1	2 (Note: Appearance(s) in Scottish Challenge Cup)	0	39	1
St Mirren	2003–04	Scottish First Division	24	4	2	0	0	0	2	0	28	4
St Mirren	2004–05	Scottish First Division	34	1	3	0	1	0	1	0	39	1
St Mirren	2005–06	Scottish First Division	35	3	4	0	2	0	4	2	45	5
St Mirren	2006–07	Scottish Premier League	24	1	1	0	2	0	—		27	1
St Mirren	Total		152	9	11	0	7	1	9	2	179	12
Norwich City	2006–07	Championship	14	1	1	0	—		—		15	1
Norwich City	2007–08	Championship	15	1	0	0	3	1	—		18	2
Norwich City	2008–09	Championship	5	0	0	0	0	0	—		5	0
Norwich City	2009–10	League One	44	0	2	0	2	0	2 (Note: Appearance(s) in Football League Trophy)	0	50	0
Norwich City	2010–11	Championship	27	0	1	0	2	0	—		30	0
Norwich City	2011–12	Premier League	4	0	1	0	1	0	—		6	0
Norwich City	2012–13	Premier League	0	0	1	0	1	1	—		1	1
Norwich City	Total		109	2	6	0	9	2	2	0	126	4
Motherwell (loan)	2007–08	Scottish Premier League	14	2	1	0	—		—		15	2
Cardiff City	2012–13	Championship	2	0	—		—		—		2	0
Cardiff City	2013–14	Premier League	0	0	—		0	0	—		0	0
Cardiff City	Total		2	0	—		0	0	—		2	0
Sheffield United (loan)	2013–14	League One	9	0	2	0	—		1	0	12	0
St Johnstone	2014–15	Scottish Premiership	27	1	2	0	2	0	—		31	1
St Johnstone	2015–16	Scottish Premiership	23	2	0	0	3	1	1 (Note: Appearance in UEFA Europa League)	0	27	3
St Johnstone	Total		50	3	2	0	5	1	1	0	58	4
York City	2016–17	National League	7	0	—		—		2 (Note: Appearance(s) in FA Trophy)	0	9	0
King's Lynn Town	2017–18	Southern League Premier Division	30	3	—		—		1	0	31	3
Career total			373	19	22	0	21	4	16	2	432	25

== Honours ==
St Mirren

- Scottish First Division: 2005–06
- Scottish Challenge Cup: 2005–06

Norwich City

- Football League One: 2009–10
- Football League Championship runner-up: 2010–11
