= 2005–06 Scottish Challenge Cup =

2005–06 Challenge Cup
Tournament details
- Country: Scotland
- Teams: 30

Final positions
- Champions: St Mirren
- Runners-up: Hamilton Academical

Tournament statistics
- Matches played: 29
- Goals scored: 88 (3.03 per match)

The 2005–06 Scottish Challenge Cup was the 15th season of the competition, competed for by all 30 members of the Scottish Football League. The defending champions were Falkirk, who defeated Ross County 2–1 in the 2004 final. Falkirk did not compete in the tournament after being promoted to the Scottish Premier League.

The final was played on 6 November 2005 and was won by St Mirren who defeated Hamilton Academical 2–1 in the final at Excelsior Stadium in Airdrie.

== Schedule ==
Round	First match date	Fixtures	Clubs
First round	Sat/Sun 30/31 July 2005	14	30 → 16
Second round	Tue/Wed 30/31 August 2005	8	16 → 8
Quarter-finals	Tue/Wed 13/14 September 2005	4	8 → 4
Semi-finals	Tuesday 27 September 2005	2	4 → 2
Final	Sunday 6 November 2005	1	2 → 1

== First round ==
Airdrie United and Dumbarton received random byes into the second round

30 July 2005	Arbroath	1–3	Stranraer	Gayfield Park, Arbroath
15:00		Report		Attendance: 319; Referee: M Ritchie

30 July 2005	Ayr United	0 – 1 (a.e.t.)	Stirling Albion	Somerset Park, Ayr
15:00		Report		Attendance: 910; Referee: C Melville

30 July 2005	Brechin City	3 – 2 (a.e.t.)	Clyde	Glebe Park, Brechin
15:00		Report		Attendance: 547; Referee: I Brines

30 July 2005	East Fife	0–4	Stenhousemuir	Bayview Stadium, Methil
15:00		Report		Attendance: 310

30 July 2005	Greenock Morton	3 – 2 (a.e.t.)	Gretna	Cappielow, Greenock
15:00		Report		Attendance: 2,798; Referee: W Collum

30 July 2005	Partick Thistle	2–0	Cowdenbeath	Firhill Stadium, Glasgow
15:00		Report		Attendance: 1,541; Referee: M Sproule

30 July 2005	Peterhead	1 – 2 (a.e.t.)	Berwick Rangers	Balmoor, Peterhead
15:00		Report		Attendance: 620; Referee: S MacDonald

30 July 2005	Queen of the South	4–0	Albion Rovers	Palmerston Park, Dumfries
15:00		Report		Attendance: 1,492; Referee: C Murray

30 July 2005	Queen's Park	0–3	Hamilton Academical	Hampden Park, Glasgow
15:00		Report		Attendance: 755; Referee: A Hunter

30 July 2005	Raith Rovers	3 – 1 (a.e.t.)	Elgin City	Stark's Park, Kirkcaldy
15:00		Report		Attendance: 1,418; Referee: M Tumilty

30 July 2005	Ross County	2–1	Montrose	Victoria Park, Dingwall
15:00		Report		Attendance: 1,200; Referee: I Frickleton

30 July 2005	St Johnstone	2–0	Alloa Athletic	McDiarmid Park, Perth
15:00		Report		Attendance: 1,592; Referee: E Smith

30 July 2005	St Mirren	1 – 0 (a.e.t.)	Forfar Athletic	St Mirren Park, Paisley
15:00		Report		Attendance: 1,605; Referee: S Conroy

31 July 2005	Dundee	2–0	East Stirlingshire	Dens Park, Dundee
15:00		Report		Attendance: 2,554

Source: ESPN Soccernet

== Second round ==
30 August 2005	Brechin City	0–2	Greenock Morton	Glebe Park, Brechin
19:30		Report		Attendance: 617

30 August 2005	Dundee	1 – 1 (a.e.t.) (3–2 p)	Airdrie United	Dens Park, Dundee
19:45		Report		Attendance: 1,857; Referee: K Clark

30 August 2005	Partick Thistle	4 – 4 (a.e.t.) (7–8 p)	St Johnstone	Firhill Stadium, Glasgow
19:45		Report		Attendance: 1,466; Referee: D McDonald

30 August 2005	Raith Rovers	2 – 1 (a.e.t.)	Dumbarton	Stark's Park, Kirkcaldy
19:45		Report		Attendance: 1,382; Referee: M McCurry

30 August 2005	Ross County	0–1	Hamilton Academical	Victoria Park, Dingwall
19:45		Report		Attendance: 1,024

31 August 2005	Queen of the South	1–2	St Mirren	Palmerston Park, Dumfries
19:30		Report		Attendance: 1,415; Referee: I Brines

31 August 2005	Stirling Albion	2–1	Berwick Rangers	Forthbank Stadium, Stirling
19:30		Report		Attendance: 467; Referee: C Thomson

31 August 2005	Stranraer	1–2	Stenhousemuir	Stair Park, Stranraer
19:30		Report		Attendance: 412; Referee: C Richmond

Source: ESPN Soccernet

== Quarter-finals ==
13 September 2005
19:45

Hamilton Academical	2–0	Dundee
Carrigan 31'; Keogh 54'	Report

New Douglas Park, Hamilton
Attendance: 609
Referee: M McCurry

13 September 2005
19:45

St Johnstone	5–1	Raith Rovers
Milne 31', 43', 67'; Scotland 35'; Mensing 47'	Report	McManus 21'

McDiarmid Park, Perth
Attendance: 1,672
Referee: K Clarke

13 September 2005
19:45

St Mirren	3–2	Stenhousemuir
Lappin 20'; Adam 22'; Sutton 23'	Report	Mercer 32'; McGrillen 38'

St Mirren Park, Paisley
Attendance: 725

14 September 2005
19:45

Stirling Albion	1–2	Greenock Morton
Fraser 31'	Report	Walker 30'; McLaughlin 83'

Forthbank Stadium, Stirling
Attendance: 1,083
Referee: J Underhill

== Semi-finals ==
27 September 2005
19:45

St Johnstone	1–2	Hamilton Academical
Rutkiewicz	Report	Keogh; Ferguson

McDiarmid Park, Perth
Attendance: 1,850
Referee: K Clarke

27 September 2005
19:45

St Mirren	0 – 0 (a.e.t.) (4 – 2 pen.)	Greenock Morton
	Report

Love Street, Paisley
Attendance: 6,542

== Final ==
5 November 2005
15:00

St Mirren	2–1	Hamilton Academical
Lappin 22'; Sutton 80'	Report	Tunbridge 47'

Excelsior Stadium, Airdrie
Attendance: 9,613
Referee: Stuart Dougal
