= Kirk Broadfoot =

Scottish footballer

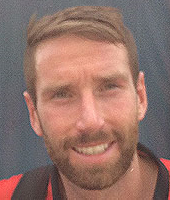
- Broadfoot in 2014

Personal information
- Full name: Kirk John Broadfoot
- Date of birth: 8 August 1984 (age 42)
- Place of birth: Irvine, Scotland
- Position: Defender

Youth career
- Coyle Thistle
- Ayr Valspar
- Auchinleck Talbot
- Queen of the South
- 2000–2002: Hibernian

Senior career*
Years	Team	Apps	(Gls)
2002–2007	St Mirren	154	(13)
2007–2012	Rangers	80	(1)
2012–2014	Blackpool	65	(2)
2014–2017	Rotherham United	60	(1)
2017–2019	Kilmarnock	60	(2)
2019–2020	St Mirren	8	(0)
2020–2021	Kilmarnock	35	(0)
2021–2022	Inverness Caledonian Thistle	34	(2)
2022–2023	Open Goal Broomhill	30	(4)
2023–2025	Greenock Morton	39	(3)
2025	Kelty Hearts	7	(0)

International career^{‡}
2006	Scotland U21	5	(0)
2006–2007	Scotland B	3	(0)
2008–2010	Scotland	4	(1)
- * Club domestic league appearances and goals as of 11 June 2025 ‡ National team caps and goals as of 30 August 2010

Kirk John Broadfoot (born 8 August 1984) is a Scottish former footballer who is now on the coaching staff of Kilmarnock. He last played as a defender for Scottish League One club Kelty Hearts in 2025.

Broadfoot started his senior career with St Mirren and he helped the club gain promotion to the Scottish Premier League by winning the 2005–06 Scottish First Division. He moved to Rangers as a free agent in 2007 and enjoyed success with the Ibrox club until he left Rangers by mutual consent in August 2012. Broadfoot then joined English club Blackpool, but was released by them in May 2014, moving on to Rotherham.

In 2017 he returned to Scotland and joined Kilmarnock, spending two full seasons with the club. Broadfoot returned to St Mirren in September 2019, but in January 2020 he moved back to Kilmarnock. After a year with Inverness Caledonian Thistle, Broadfoot signed for Open Goal Broomhill in July 2022 for the season, before signing for Greenock Morton in June 2023.

He made his debut for the Scotland national team on 10 September 2008 against Iceland, a game in which he scored. He was capped four times in total at full level.

== Early life ==
Broadfoot was brought up in the Ayrshire village of Drongan. He played at boys club level for Coyle Thistle, Ayr Valspar, Auchinleck Talbot and Queen of the South.

== Club career ==
=== St Mirren ===
Broadfoot initially signed for Scottish Premier League side Hibernian as a sixteen-year-old apprentice, but he was released and signed for St Mirren on 1 July 2002. He went on to make 174 appearances for the club and was team captain for the 2006–07 season, replacing teammate Kevin McGowne. Broadfoot was part of the St Mirren side which gained promotion to the Scottish Premier League for the 2006–07 season, and the team that won the 2005 Scottish Challenge Cup Final in November 2005.

=== Rangers ===
In March 2007, Broadfoot signed a pre-contract agreement to join Rangers in the summer. Broadfoot officially joined Rangers on 1 July that year. He made his debut against FK Zeta in a UEFA Champions League qualifier, on 31 July 2007 and scored his first Rangers goal in a 7–2 victory against Falkirk in the Scottish Premier League. In the early part of the season, Broadfoot's first team opportunities were limited after suffering a hamstring injury which caused him to miss three games.

After Alan Hutton left for Tottenham Hotspur in the January transfer window, Broadfoot replaced him at right-back and was praised by manager Walter Smith. After making an appearance in the Scottish Cup against Hibernian early in 2008, he made only his second League start against Falkirk during a 2–0 win on 9 February and Rangers gave him the Man of the Match award. Following that, he was a regular in the side during the 2007–08 season. Broadfoot played in the 2008 Scottish League Cup Final helping Rangers to a 3–2 penalty shootout win at Hampden Park against Dundee United. He also played a significant role in Rangers' run to the 2008 UEFA Cup Final, but had to settle for a runners-up medal as the side lost 2–0 to Russian outfit Zenit Saint Petersburg. Broadfoot was dropped, however, for the 2008 Scottish Cup Final against Queen of the South.

He played regularly for Rangers in the 2008–09 season and made his international debut early that season. Broadfoot provided an assist for Kenny Miller in a 4–2 Old Firm victory against Celtic in August 2008. He was sent off in the 2009 Scottish League Cup Final for a professional foul on Aiden McGeady, who converted the resulting penalty kick to give Celtic a 2–0 victory. During that match, Broadfoot was playing with a foot injury which ended his season after starting 28 league matches during the campaign. The extent of the foot injury meant Broadfoot was not fully fit to play until November 2009 in a closed doors match. During his injury rest, Broadfoot needed hospital treatment for scalds after an egg he was poaching in the microwave sprayed hot liquid into his face.

Broadfoot made his return to the Rangers' first team on 12 December 2009, nearly nine months after his last game, in a 3–0 victory against St Johnstone. After the match, Broadfoot said his foot injury resulted in the 'toughest period in his life'. On 21 June 2010, Broadfoot signed a new three-year contract with Rangers; his original deal was due to expire at the end of that month.

During Rangers' match with Manchester United on 14 September, Broadfoot made an innocuous challenge on Antonio Valencia that resulted in his opponent suffering a broken ankle. Broadfoot was visibly distressed by the injury suffered by Valencia. In Rangers' next Champions League match, Broadfoot provided an assist for Steven Naismith in a 1–0 win over Turkish side Bursaspor at Ibrox to gain them their first win in 12 Champions League matches. Soon afterwards, Broadfoot's injury jinx struck again, resulting in him being ruled out until January. However, he then suffered a hairline fracture of his heel and his return was further delayed, missing the rest of the season.

Ahead of the new season, Broadfoot made his first appearance from injury in a 1–0 loss against German side Sportfreunde Lotte Broadfoot noted his future at Rangers could be in doubt if his first team opportunities were limited. After a 2–0 win over Kilmarnock, he was involved in an altercation with opponent Manuel Pascali after the full-time whistle, with manager Ally McCoist describing the pair's actions as 'handbags' Broadfoot criticised Kilmarnock manager, Kenny Shiels – after he described Broadfoot as "the ugly boy from Rangers" and "the male model from Ayrshire" in a radio interview – as immature and also claimed that Pascali made a threat towards him saying "in my face, saying he was going to kill me". In response, Pascali branded Broadfoot as a publicity-seeking coward. After a 1–0 loss to Kilmarnock on 29 November 2011 when he clashed with Rangers' fans, he was forced to have clear-the-air talks with McCoist.

During the season, Rangers went into administration over financial problems and a dispute with HMRC, leading to a 10-point deduction. On 14 June 2012, Rangers entered liquidation and its business and assets were then sold to a new company, Sevco Scotland Limited. Many players lodged an objection against their contracts being transferred from Rangers to Sevco, leading them to become free agents. Broadfoot's future at Rangers was unclear but he was one of several players who continued to train with Rangers. In June, he rejected a move to Hungarian side Debreceni, insisting he was happy at Rangers

Having made two appearances for Rangers in the new season, Broadfoot left the club by mutual consent on 28 August 2012. He explained that the move was aimed at earning an international recall but he would welcome an eventual return to Rangers.

=== Blackpool ===
One week after leaving Rangers, Broadfoot signed until the end of the 2012–13 season with Championship side Blackpool. He also revealed that he had been close to signing for the Seasiders two years earlier. Of the move, he said: "I think it's got something special about it, Blackpool, it just seems to have this aura about it that everyone seems to enjoy themselves here and I wanted to be part of that." However, his debut was delayed by injuries.

Broadfoot had to wait until 29 September 2012, making his first start and playing 90 minutes in a 3–0 loss to Cardiff City; he made his home debut in a 1–1 draw against Brighton & Hove Albion on 27 October 2012. After the match, Broadfoot said he wanted to play an important role for the club. On 15 December 2012, he scored his first goal, in a 2–0 win over Blackburn Rovers, giving new manager Michael Appleton his first home success. However, Appleton's stay as manager was short-lived. Later in the 2012–13 season, Broadfoot continued to be a regular in the first team, playing in both central and right defence. On 5 March 2013, he scored his second goal for the club, in a 1–1 draw against Birmingham City. In mid-April, Broadfoot was among seven players offered a new contract. At the end of the 2012–13 season, he was linked with Championship rivals Ipswich Town and Barnsley. Eventually, Broadfoot ended transfer speculation by signing a one-year extension with the club. After signing a new contract, Broadfoot revealed that many clubs were interested in signing him and he expressed his delight at signing a new contract.

At the start of the 2013–14 season, Broadfoot switched his number from forty-two to six. He continued to be in the first team, mostly being used in the right-back and centre-back positions. In a 1–1 draw with Huddersfield Town in September 2013, Broadfoot assisted for Ricardo Fuller to put Blackpool 1–0 in front. However, he had discipline issues, being sent-off twice during the season; he was disciplined by Manager Paul Ince after being sent-off in a 1–0 loss to Yeovil Town and another came when he lunged at Marius Žaliūkas in the last minutes of the second half, in a 1–1 draw against Leeds United on 26 December 2013. After serving his suspension, Broadfoot was named captain for five matches for in the absence of his teammate Gary MacKenzie. However, Broadfoot then missed the rest of the season with a knee problem. At the end of the season, Broadfoot was released by the club after they decided not to offer a new contract.

=== Rotherham United ===
Broadfoot signed a two-year contract with Rotherham United on 9 June 2014. Upon joining Rotherham, Broadfoot said he joined "The Millers" for new challenges and to play as many games as possible. he made his league debut for the club in the opening game of the 2014–15 season, as a right back, as Rotherham lost 1–0 to Derby County.

In July 2015, Broadfoot was suspended for 10 matches, after he was found to have verbally abused Wigan Athletic player James McClean during a match in March 2015. The abuse, which was reported to be of a sectarian nature, was delivered after Broadfoot thought that McClean had cheated to win a penalty kick. The anti-sectarianism campaign group Nil By Mouth welcomed the severity of the punishment, and highlighted what it perceived to be the different attitudes shown towards sectarianism by the English and Scottish football authorities.

Broadfoot scored his first goal for the Millers on 9 April 2016, a header in a 4–0 win against relegation rivals MK Dons.

=== Kilmarnock ===
Broadfoot signed a three-year contract with Kilmarnock in July 2017. Broadfoot spent two seasons with Kilmarnock, the latter of which included a third-place finish in the Scottish Premiership, their best position for 50 years. He left the club on 2 September 2019, having made 78 appearances for the Rugby Park club.

=== Return to St Mirren ===
Broadfoot signed a two-year contract with St Mirren on 3 September 2019.

=== Return to Kilmarnock ===
After only five months at St Mirren, Broadfoot returned to Kilmarnock on 31 January 2020, signing an eighteen-month contract.

=== Inverness Caledonian Thistle ===
On 12 July 2021, Broadfoot signed for Inverness Caledonian Thistle on a one-year deal. He scored the winning penalty in the shootout of the Scottish Championship Play-Off Semi-Final 2nd Leg against Arbroath at Gayfield Park, sending Inverness to the final where they would ultimately be beaten by Perth side St Johnstone 6–2 on aggregate, including a 4-0 thrashing in the second leg at McDiarmid Park.

=== Broomhill ===
Broadfoot signed for Open Goal Broomhill in the Scottish Lowland League in July 2022. His first goal for the club came in a 3–0 win at Cowdenbeath on 26 July 2022.

=== Greenock Morton ===
Broadfoot signed a one-year contract with Greenock Morton in June 2023. He scored twice for Morton in their opening Viaplay Cup Group Stage, against Kelty Hearts and Edinburgh City respectively. He left Morton on 1 February 2025 by mutual consent.

=== Kelty Hearts ===
In 2025, Broadfoot signed for Scottish League One side Kelty Hearts, hoping to reach 700 appearances before retiring. He left Kelty at the end of the 2024-25 season.

== International career ==
In November 2006, Broadfoot was called up to the Scotland B squad and played in the 0–0 draw with Republic of Ireland B. He made his second B team appearance in a 1–1 draw, also against the Republic of Ireland a year later. He has also won Scotland under-21 international caps. In September 2008, Broadfoot was called up to the Scotland senior squad to replace David Weir. Broadfoot made his debut for the senior side on 10 September 2008 against Iceland, and he scored the opening goal in a 2–1 Scotland win. Broadfoot retained his place for Scotland's next two matches, a 2010 FIFA World Cup qualifying match against Norway, and a friendly match against Diego Maradona's Argentina side.

== Coaching career ==
On 13 July 2026, Kilmarnock announced that Broadfoot had joined the club as a first team coach.

== Career statistics ==
=== Club ===
As of match played 23 May 2022

Appearances and goals by club, season and competition
Club	Season	League			National Cup		League Cup		Other (Note: Includes European and Scottish Challenge Cup matches)		Total	
Club	Season	Division	Apps	Goals	Apps	Goals	Apps	Goals	Apps	Goals	Apps	Goals
St Mirren	2002–03	Scottish First Division	23	1	1	0	1	0	0	0	25	1
St Mirren	2003–04	Scottish First Division	31	3	2	0	1	0	1 (Note: Appearances in the Scottish Challenge Cup)	0	35	3
St Mirren	2004–05	Scottish First Division	36	4	3	0	1	0	1	0	41	4
St Mirren	2005–06	Scottish First Division	27	2	0	0	2	0	4	0	33	2
St Mirren	2006–07	Scottish Premier League	37	3	1	0	2	0	—		40	3
St Mirren	Total		154	13	7	0	7	0	6	0	174	13
Rangers	2007–08	Scottish Premier League	15	1	5	0	2	0	12 (Note: Three appearances in the Champions League and nine in the UEFA Cup)	0	34	1
Rangers	2008–09	Scottish Premier League	27	0	1	0	4	0	2 (Note: Appearances in the Champions League) (Note: Total includes both matches versus FBK Kaunas. Broadfoot started both legs per the BBC match reports (1st leg)(2nd leg), but it is not recorded by soccerbase (1st leg); (2nd leg).)	0	34	0
Rangers	2009–10	Scottish Premier League	12	0	4	0	0	0	0	0	16	0
Rangers	2010–11	Scottish Premier League	8	0	0	0	2	0	4	0	14	0
Rangers	2011–12	Scottish Premier League	16	0	0	0	0	0	2 (Note: Appearances in the Europa League)	0	18	0
Rangers	2012–13	Scottish Third Division	2	0	0	0	1	0	2	0	5	0
Rangers	Total		80	1	10	0	9	0	22	0	121	1
Blackpool	2012–13	Championship	32	2	2	0	0	0	—		34	2
Blackpool	2013–14	Championship	33	0	0	0	1	0	—		34	0
Blackpool	Total		65	2	2	0	1	0	0	0	68	2
Rotherham United	2014–15	Championship	25	0	0	0	2	0	—		27	0
Rotherham United	2015–16	Championship	32	1	1	0	0	0	—		33	0
Rotherham United	2016–17	Championship	3	0	1	0	0	0	—		4	0
Rotherham United	Total		60	1	2	0	2	0	0	0	64	1
Kilmarnock	2017–18	Scottish Premiership	30	1	4	0	5	0	—		39	1
Kilmarnock	2018–19	Scottish Premiership	27	1	1	0	5	0	–		33	1
Kilmarnock	2019–20	Scottish Premiership	3	0	0	0	1	0	2	0	6	0
Kilmarnock	Total		60	2	5	0	11	0	2	0	78	2
St Mirren	2019–20	Scottish Premiership	8	0	0	0	0	0	—		8	0
Kilmarnock	2019–20	Scottish Premiership	6	0	2	0	0	0	0	0	8	0
Kilmarnock	2020–21	Scottish Premiership	29	0	3	0	1	0	—		33	0
Kilmarnock	Total		35	0	5	0	1	0	0	0	41	0
Inverness Caledonian Thistle	2021–22	Scottish Championship	34	2	2	0	4	0	6	0	46	2
Open Goal Broomhill	2022–23	Lowland League	0	0	0	0	0	0	0	0	0	0
Career total			496	21	33	0	35	0	36	0	600	21

=== International ===
International goals
Scores and results list Scotland's goal tally first.

#	Date	Venue	Opponent	Score	Result	Competition
1.	10 September 2008	Laugardalsvöllur, Reykjavík	Iceland	1–0	2–1	FIFA World Cup 2010 qualifying

== Honours ==
=== Club ===
St Mirren

- Scottish First Division: 2005–06
- Scottish Challenge Cup: 2005–06

Rangers

- Scottish Premier League: 2008–09, 2009–10, 2010–11
- Scottish League Cup: 2007–08
- UEFA Cup runner-up: 2007–08
