= Charlie Adam =

Scottish football manager (born 1985)

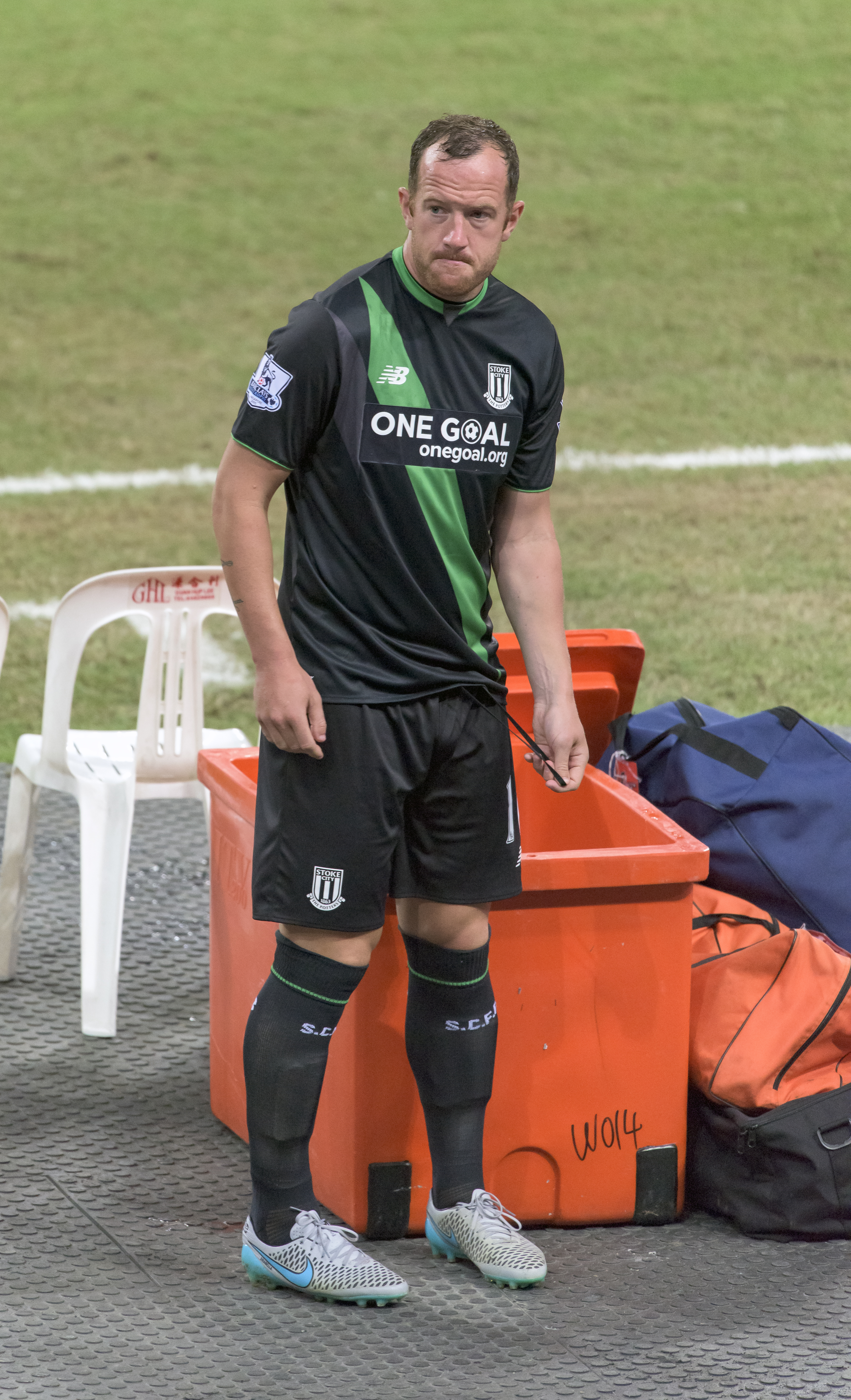
- Adam in 2015

Personal information
- Full name: Charles Graham Adam
- Date of birth: 10 December 1985 (age 40)
- Place of birth: Dundee, Scotland
- Height: 6 ft 1 in (1.85 m)
- Position: Midfielder

Team information
- Current team: Everton (set-piece coach)

Youth career
- Dundee
- –2003: Rangers

Senior career*
Years	Team	Apps	(Gls)
2003–2009	Rangers	61	(13)
2004–2005	→ Ross County (loan)	11	(2)
2005–2006	→ St Mirren (loan)	29	(5)
2009	→ Blackpool (loan)	13	(2)
2009–2011	Blackpool	78	(28)
2011–2012	Liverpool	28	(2)
2012–2019	Stoke City	156	(19)
2019–2020	Reading	21	(2)
2020–2022	Dundee	49	(7)
Total		446	(80)

International career
2006	Scotland U21	5	(1)
2006–2007	Scotland B	3	(0)
2007–2015	Scotland	26	(0)

Managerial career
- 2023–2024: Fleetwood Town
- * Club domestic league appearances and goals

Charles Graham Adam (born 10 December 1985) is a Scottish former professional footballer who played as a midfielder. He was most recently the set-piece coach at Everton. Prior to that, he was the manager of EFL League Two club Fleetwood Town.

Adam started his senior career with Rangers. He spent much of his early senior career on loan to Ross County and St Mirren. While on loan to St Mirren during the 2005–06 season, Adam was part of the team that won both the Scottish Challenge Cup and First Division, playing in over thirty matches for the Saints. Upon returning to Rangers at the end of the 2006 season, he became a regular under managers Paul Le Guen and Walter Smith. Adam was also part of the Rangers team that reached the 2008 UEFA Cup Final.

After falling out of favour at Rangers during 2008–09, Adam was loaned out to English Championship side Blackpool. The loan was made permanent at the start of the 2009–10 season, and Adam became an integral part of the Blackpool side, captaining the team to a play-off victory over Cardiff City which resulted in their promotion to the Premier League. Adam shone in his first season in the Premier League, his performances being recognised with a nomination for the PFA Players' Player of the Year in April 2011; however, Blackpool were relegated the following month, and he transferred to Liverpool in July.

After one season at Anfield, Adam joined Stoke City in August 2012 for a fee of £4 million. He spent seven seasons with Stoke, making 179 appearances, before joining Reading in July 2019. Adam returned to his boyhood club Dundee in September 2020. He captained them for two years and led them to promotion to the Scottish Premiership.

Adam played at under-21, B and full international levels for Scotland.

== Club career ==
=== Rangers ===
Adam was part of the Dundee and Rangers youth set-ups. He won the Scottish Youth Cup with Rangers in 2001–02. He made his senior debut for Rangers on 14 April 2004 against Livingston. He played sporadically for Rangers thereafter, but did not become a first-team regular until the management of Paul Le Guen.

Adam made an appearance at the start of the 2004–05 season, and then joined First Division club Ross County on loan for the rest of that campaign. While in Dingwall, Adam made fifteen appearances, scoring twice, against Raith Rovers and St Mirren. He also played in the 2004 Scottish Challenge Cup Final against Falkirk. County were ahead courtesy of David Winters 56th-minute goal. Adam was substituted in the 60th minute as was teammate Sean Higgins six minutes later. Neil Scally and Darryl Duffy then scored in 70 and 75 minutes respectively for Falkirk to come back to lift the trophy.

Adam then joined First Division side St Mirren on loan for the 2005–06 season. During his spell in Paisley, he again appeared in the 2005 Scottish Challenge Cup Final, however this time he was on the winning side as St Mirren defeated Hamilton Academical 2–1. He was also part of the team that won the First Division title in May 2006. In total he made 37 appearances and scored nine goals for the "Buddies" during a very successful stint in Paisley.

After playing for Rangers during a July 2006 pre-season trip to South Africa, including scoring a hat-trick against a Jomo Select side, Adam began the 2006–07 season with the club, and he started in their first league match against Motherwell. He continued to be a regular for Rangers as the season progressed, and scored his first goal for the club in a 3–2 UEFA Cup win over Livorno on 19 October. This was one of fourteen goals Adam scored that season, including strikes against Israeli sides Hapoel Tel Aviv and Maccabi Haifa, as well as a goal in an end-of-season Old Firm match from a free-kick. On 16 April 2007, at the end of his first season in the first team, Adam was voted by Rangers fans as the club's Young Player of the Year at an award ceremony.

On 28 June 2007, it was announced that Adam had signed a new five-year contract with Rangers. Adam had scored his first UEFA Champions League goal on 19 September against VfB Stuttgart, and his second in the return fixture. Adam played against Panathinaikos and Werder Bremen in Rangers run to the 2008 UEFA Cup Final where he was an unused substitute as Rangers lost 2–0 to Zenit Saint Petersburg. That season Rangers also won the 2007–08 Scottish League Cup and the 2007–08 Scottish Cup, but Adam was suspended for the League Cup final against Dundee United and left out of the squad for the Scottish Cup final against Queen of the South.

=== Blackpool ===
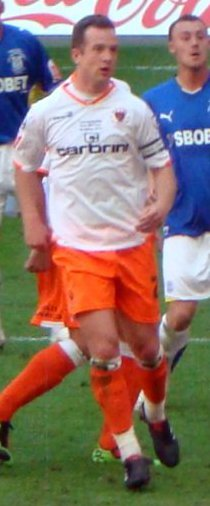
Charlie Adam playing for Blackpool in the 2010 Football League Championship play-off final

On 2 February 2009, Adam signed on loan with English Championship club Blackpool until the end of the 2008–09 season, after caretaker manager Tony Parkes initially enquired about having Alan Gow loaned to the club again. Five days later, after an altercation with Richie Wellens, he was sent off on his debut for the Seasiders during a 3–2 defeat by Doncaster Rovers at Bloomfield Road.

On 25 February, after serving a three-match suspension, Adam scored twice, including a goal from just inside the halfway line, for the club's reserve team as they beat Accrington Stanley 4–2. Adam scored his first Football League goal for Blackpool in a 2–0 victory over Norwich City at Bloomfield Road on 7 March. Two days later he was named in the Football League's "Championship Team of the Week". His second goal for Blackpool came on 11 April in their 1–0 West Lancashire derby win over Preston North End at Deepdale. Tony Parkes publicly admitted he was keen to sign Adam permanently. He said, "I have spoken to our club secretary and we will be in touch with Rangers to see if we can do a deal for Charlie". At the end of the season, after two goals in 13 appearances, he returned to Rangers.

On 6 July 2009, Rangers confirmed that they had accepted a bid from Blackpool and that he was set to sign for the Seasiders the following day, subject to personal terms being agreed. The following day, Blackpool manager Ian Holloway confirmed a deal had been agreed with the Ibrox club, but stressed that talks with Adam would take place on 9 July, once Adam had spoken with Rangers manager Walter Smith. Four weeks later on 2 August, with Adam still a Rangers player and having been on their pre-season trip to Germany, Smith confirmed that the player was in talks with Blackpool, saying, "Adam is talking to Blackpool at the moment. The clubs have agreed a fee and it will be up to Charlie and his representative."

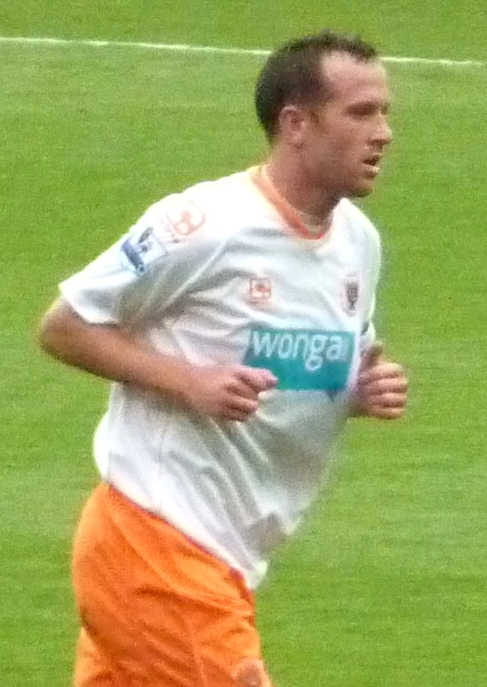
Adam during Blackpool's 2010–11 Premier League campaign.

In August 2009 Adam signed a two-year contract with Blackpool with the option of a further year, in a club-record transfer fee of £500,000. His competitive debut as a permanent Blackpool player was in a 1–1 draw with Queens Park Rangers at Loftus Road later that month. His first goal came on 26 August in a 4–1 home win over Wigan Athletic in the League Cup.

In January 2010 he was named in the Press Association's Championship "Team of the Week", along with teammate Neal Eardley, following his performance two days prior, in a 3–2 home victory over Watford. That same month, Adam won the Championship Player of the Month award and was voted the PFA Championship Fans' Player of the Month for January 2010. In March, Adam scored in his 50th league appearance for Blackpool, a 2–0 win at Plymouth Argyle. Just under a month later, Adam was named in the PFA "Championship Team of the Year".

Blackpool qualified for that season's play-offs. Adam scored a match-winning penalty against Nottingham Forest in the semi-final first leg, and Blackpool won the tie on aggregate. In the play-off final, Adam scored a free-kick as Blackpool beat Cardiff City 3–2 at Wembley Stadium and gained promotion to the Premier League.

In the fourth week of the 2010–11 Premier League season, Adam was named in the official Team of the Week. He was named again in week seven, alongside teammate Luke Varney. In early December, a tribunal ruled in favour of Adam in a dispute over unpaid bonuses from the previous season. They found that Blackpool were required to pay the player £25,000 for successfully avoiding relegation to League One. The club had argued that the promotion bonus (which had been stipulated in Adam's contract) superseded the 'survival bonus.' The panel upheld Adam's complaint, but did not agree with his second argument that the failure to pay the amount constituted a breach of contract on the club's part. As a result, both parties were responsible for their own legal fees – leaving Adam with a very small net gain from the venture.

In January 2011, Blackpool rejected a £4.5 million bid from Liverpool to buy Adam, an amount described by manager Ian Holloway as "disgraceful". Blackpool then rejected a transfer request that Adam had made to the club. He was one of seven nominees for the 2010–11 PFA Players' Player of the Year. However, Adam and his Blackpool teammates were relegated at the season's end. In May 2011, Blackpool activated an option to increase Adam's contract by a further twelve months.

=== Liverpool ===
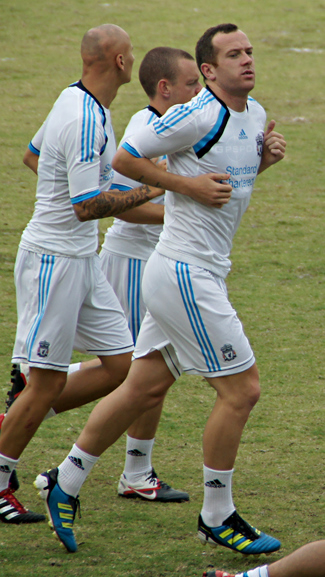
Adam training for Liverpool in 2011

In July 2011 Liverpool signed Adam from Blackpool for a fee of £6.75 million after having their initial bid rejected. He played the second half of Liverpool's friendly against Guangdong Sunray Cave in a 4–3 win on 13 July. On 13 August 2011, Adam made his full debut in Liverpool's first game of the 2011–12 Premier League, playing the full 90 minutes in a 1–1 draw against Sunderland at Anfield. There, he assisted the opening goal from Luis Suárez from a free kick outside the area.

On 27 August 2011, Adam scored his first Premier League goal for Liverpool in a match against Bolton Wanderers which Liverpool went on to win 3–1. On 18 September 2011, Adam was shown a second yellow card for a challenge on Scott Parker in a 4–0 defeat at Tottenham Hotspur. Adam helped Liverpool beat local rivals Everton 2–0 on 1 October 2011. He then scored a penalty in a 2–0 win away at West Bromwich Albion. Liverpool reached the 2012 Football League Cup Final where they defeated Championship side Cardiff City in a penalty shootout, despite Adam missing his kick. They also made it to the 2012 FA Cup Final, which Adam missed due to injury as they lost 2–1 to Chelsea.

=== Stoke City ===
On 31 August 2012 Adam signed a four-year contract at Stoke City for an undisclosed fee believed to be around £4 million. He made his debut for Stoke the following day in a 2–2 draw against Wigan Athletic. After leaving Liverpool, Adam stated he left in order to play more games. He scored his first goal for Stoke in a 1–0 victory against Queens Park Rangers on 10 November 2012. He scored in another 1–0 win for Stoke two weeks later against Fulham. Adam was given compassionate leave after his father died on 17 December 2012. Adam then spent three months in and out of the team before returning to the starting line up in April and scored the winning goal against Norwich City which eased Stoke's relegation worries. He dedicated his goal to his father. Adam ended the 2012–13 season a poor note, being sent off against Tottenham Hotspur for two bookable offences.

Adam scored Stoke's first goal of the 2013–14 season as City beat Crystal Palace 2–1 on 24 August 2013. Adam then scored a penalty in a 3–3 draw with Swansea City and then in the next match against Sunderland in a 2–0 victory. Adam came off the bench to help Stoke to a 2–1 victory over Aston Villa on 21 December 2013 which earned him praise from manager Mark Hughes for his contribution. He scored Stoke's second goal against his former club Liverpool on 12 January 2014 in a 5–3 defeat. On 1 February 2014, Adam scored twice in a 2–1 win over Manchester United to help Stoke record a first league win over the Red Devils since 1984. His first goal however was later ruled by the Premier League as a Michael Carrick own goal. In the next match against Southampton on 8 February, Adam provided assists for both Stoke's goals in a 2–2 draw. He was given a three-match retrospective ban by the FA following an altercation with Olivier Giroud in a 1–0 win over Arsenal on 1 March 2014. On 11 May 2014 Adam scored the winning goal against West Bromwich Albion on the final day of the season which earned Stoke 9th place in the Premier League.

Adam scored his first goals of the 2014–15 against Sunderland and Swansea City. In November 2014 he lost his place in the side due to the form of Bojan Krkić. On 4 April 2015 Adam scored from 65 yards against Chelsea in a 2–1 defeat. Adam described his goal as a "once in a lifetime goal". Adam then went and scored four more goals in April and May including on the final day of the season in a 6–1 victory against his former club Liverpool. Adam ended the season by playing and scoring for Dundee in Julián Speroni's testimonial. Adam signed a new contract with Stoke on 20 June 2015.

Adam made 25 appearances in 2015–16, 11 of which were as a substitute. He scored once, on 30 April 2016 against Crystal Palace. He played 28 times in 2016–17, as Stoke finished in 13th position. Adam again scored one goal which was a penalty against Arsenal in December 2016. Adam struggled for playing time in 2017–18, making 14 appearances, as Stoke suffered relegation to the EFL Championship. Adam made two noticeable errors during Stoke failed survival bid as he saw his last minute penalty saved against Brighton & Hove Albion in February and was needlessly sent-off against Everton in March. Following relegation Adam criticised the behaviour of some of his teammates.

Adam struggled for playing time under Gary Rowett in the first half of the 2018–19 season before he was brought back into the squad by Nathan Jones in January 2019, before a calf injury disrupted his comeback. Adam revealed in April 2019 that he wanted to extend his contract at Stoke. However, after talks with manager Nathan Jones, Adam left Stoke at the end of the season.

Adam met with Blackpool's new owner Simon Sadler about possibly rejoining the club and hopefully finishing his career there. "But, out of the blue, I got an opportunity to go and play for Reading in the Championship."

In 2021, it was revealed that Adams had been nicknamed Parched by his teammates. This was not known to Adams at the time, and stemmed from a mistaken belief by his teammates that he was ingratiating with management when there was drinks break during training. The nickname came to prominence after being discussed by Peter Crouch on his podcast, That Peter Crouch Podcast.

=== Reading ===
On 22 July 2019, Adam joined Reading, signing a one-year contract. He scored his first goal for Reading from the penalty spot in a 3–0 victory over Derby County at the Madejski Stadium on 21 December 2019. Adam was released by Reading at the end of the season.

=== Dundee and retirement ===
On 15 September 2020, after training on his own and having considered an offer to play in Australia, Adam joined his boyhood club Dundee on a two-year deal, which he described as being a "dream" of his. In an interview with FourFourTwo, Adam stated he believed Dundee would be his final club, due to his age and happiness at Dens Park.

Adam made his debut for Dundee in a Scottish League Cup tie against Brora Rangers on 10 October 2020. His first goal followed in his first league game in a defeat to Hearts. After a successful start to his time with the Dee, during which he was made captain, Adam was awarded the SPFL's Championship Player of the Month for December. At the end of the season, Adam was named to PFA Scotland's Championship Team of the Year for 2020–21, as well as being shortlisted as a finalist for their Championship Player of the Year. Adam would captain the club to winning the Premiership play-offs and helping Dundee to a return to the Scottish Premiership. Afterwards, Adam described this achievement as the highlight of his career, stating: "This is the best. I've dreamed of playing for my boyhood club in the top division and we've managed to get there." Adam would also be included in the SPFL's Championship Team of the Season, and would be named the Championship Player of the Year.

Adam sustained a groin injury in a Premiership match against Motherwell in August 2021, and despite avoiding surgery he was ruled out for six weeks. He would make his return in October and be nominated Man of the Match in a home win over Aberdeen. Adam's final few months of the season would feature various highs and lows, with a dive against St Johnstone and an unfortunate "assist" for St Mirren both going viral along with the club being relegated, but also scoring impressive goals against Dundee United and in the club's final home game of the season against Hibernian, with the Dundee derby goal winning Dundee's Goal of the Season. Adam left Dundee following the end of his contract in May 2022.

On 21 September 2022, Adam officially announced his retirement from professional football at the age of 36.

== International career ==
Adam was called up by national manager Alex McLeish to the Scotland squad for the first time on 11 May 2007 for a friendly against Austria and a Euro 2008 qualifying Group B match against the Faroe Islands. He made his debut at the Gerhard Hanappi Stadium in Vienna on 30 May as a 67th-minute substitute, in a 1–0 victory. He then made his competitive debut as a 77th-minute substitute in a 2–0 win over the Faroe Islands at the Svangaskarð stadium in Toftir on 6 June.

Adam was recalled to the Scotland squad by manager George Burley for a friendly against Japan on 10 October 2009 at the Nissan Stadium, Yokohama, Japan. On 10 November 2009, Adam was drafted into the Scotland squad for the friendly against Wales four days later.

He replaced his former Rangers teammate Kevin Thomson, who pulled out due to illness. George Burley said of Adam: "He scored a cracking goal for Blackpool last weekend. He is a very good replacement. He has been playing consistently, is a quality player, and is getting a real benefit from playing regularly."

== Post-playing and coaching career ==
Following his retirement from playing, Adam began working as loans manager at Burnley.

On 31 December 2023, Adam was appointed head coach of EFL League One club Fleetwood Town. Fleetwood were on a nine game winless run at the time of his appointment. Adam was unable to keep Fleetwood in the division and they were relegated with one game remaining. On 22 December 2024, after one win in 11 league games, he was sacked with the club sitting 18th in League Two. On 23 January 2025, Adam was confirmed as the set-piece coach at Everton as part of David Moyes's new backroom team.

== Personal life ==
Adam is the son of former professional player Charlie Adam, a midfielder who played for various Scottish clubs in the 1980s and 1990s. His father died on 17 December 2012, aged 50; the cause of death was publicly revealed as suicide in 2015. Adam's mother, Eleanor, fell ill with cancer, and was a big factor in his move back to Scotland. She died in December 2020. Adam's brother, Grant, is a goalkeeper who is who plays for fellow Dundee-based side Lochee United. He has four other siblings: brothers Gary, Connor and Grant, and sister Nicola.

Adam grew up supporting Dundee. He attended Dundee's Braeview Academy, alongside fellow future footballers Garry Kenneth and Scott Robertson (the latter of which he would be reunited with at Dundee).

Adam is married to Sophie Anderson, whom he met in September 2009 in her hometown of Poulton-le-Fylde during a night out with some of his Blackpool teammates. They have two sons, Jack and Louis, and a daughter, Anabella. He moved with his family to Glasgow after signing for Dundee, having lived in Poulton-le-Fylde since his days at Blackpool.

Adam was arrested and charged with a drink-driving offence in December 2021. In January 2022 he pleaded guilty; he was fined £2,000 and disqualified from driving for one year.

== Career statistics ==
=== Club ===
Appearances and goals by club, season and competition
Club	Season	League			National Cup		League Cup		Europe		Other		Total	
Club	Season	Division	Apps	Goals	Apps	Goals	Apps	Goals	Apps	Goals	Apps	Goals	Apps	Goals
Rangers	2003–04	Scottish Premier League	2	0	0	0	0	0	0	0	—		2	0
Rangers	2004–05	Scottish Premier League	1	0	0	0	0	0	0	0	—		1	0
Rangers	2005–06	Scottish Premier League	1	0	0	0	0	0	0	0	—		1	0
Rangers	2006–07	Scottish Premier League	32	11	1	0	2	0	8 (Note: Appearances in UEFA Cup)	3	—		43	14
Rangers	2007–08	Scottish Premier League	16	2	3	0	2	0	11 (Note: Seven appearances and two goals in UEFA Champions League, four appearances in UEFA Cup)	2	—		32	4
Rangers	2008–09	Scottish Premier League	9	0	0	0	0	0	0	0	—		9	0
Rangers	Total		61	13	4	0	4	0	19	5	—		88	18
Ross County (loan)	2004–05	Scottish First Division	11	2	0	0	0	0	—		4 (Note: Appearances in Scottish Challenge Cup)	0	15	2
St Mirren (loan)	2005–06	Scottish First Division	29	5	4	3	1	0	—		3	1	37	9
Blackpool (loan)	2008–09	Championship	13	2	0	0	0	0	—		—		13	2
Blackpool	2009–10	Championship	43	16	1	0	2	1	—		3 (Note: Appearances in Championship play-offs)	2	49	19
Blackpool	2010–11	Premier League	35	12	0	0	1	1	—		—		36	13
Blackpool	Total		91	30	1	0	3	2	—		3	2	98	34
Liverpool	2011–12	Premier League	28	2	2	0	5	0	—		—		35	2
Liverpool	2012–13	Premier League	0	0	0	0	0	0	2 (Note: Appearances in UEFA Europa League)	0	—		2	0
Liverpool	Total		28	2	2	0	5	0	2	0	—		37	2
Stoke City	2012–13	Premier League	27	3	1	0	0	0	—		—		28	3
Stoke City	2013–14	Premier League	31	7	2	1	2	0	—		—		35	8
Stoke City	2014–15	Premier League	29	7	3	0	3	0	—		—		35	7
Stoke City	2015–16	Premier League	22	1	1	0	2	0	—		—		25	1
Stoke City	2016–17	Premier League	24	1	1	0	2	0	—		—		27	1
Stoke City	2017–18	Premier League	11	0	1	1	2	0	—		—		14	1
Stoke City	2018–19	Championship	12	0	1	0	2	0	—		—		15	0
Stoke City	Total		156	19	10	2	13	0	—		—		179	21
Stoke City U23	2016–17	—	—		—		—		—		2 (Note: Appearances in EFL Trophy)	1	2	1
Stoke City U23	2017–18	—	—		—		—		—		3	0	3	0
Stoke City U23	2018–19	—	—		—		—		—		1	0	1	0
Stoke City U23	Total		—		—		—		—		6	1	6	1
Reading	2019–20	Championship	21	2	3	0	3	0	—		—		27	2
Dundee	2020–21	Scottish Championship	22	5	2	0	4	1	—		4 (Note: Appearances in Scottish Premiership play-offs)	1	32	7
Dundee	2021–22	Scottish Premiership	27	2	2	1	4	1	—		—		33	4
Dundee	Total		49	7	4	1	8	2	—		4	1	65	11
Career total			446	80	28	6	37	4	21	5	20	5	552	100

=== International ===
International statistics
National team	Year	Apps	Goals
Scotland
Scotland	2007	2	0
Scotland	2008	—	
Scotland	2009	1	0
Scotland	2010	4	0
Scotland	2011	8	0
Scotland	2012	5	0
Scotland	2013	4	0
Scotland	2014	1	0
Scotland	2015	1	0
Total		26	0

=== Managerial record ===
As of 22 December 2024

Managerial record by team and tenure
Team	From	To	Record					Ref
Team	From	To	P	W	D	L	Win %	Ref
Fleetwood Town	31 December 2023	22 December 2024	49	14	16	19	28.57	
Total			49	14	16	19	28.57	

== Honours ==
Ross County

- Scottish Challenge Cup runner-up: 2004

St Mirren

- Scottish Football League First Division: 2005–06
- Scottish Challenge Cup: 2005–06

Rangers

- UEFA Cup runner-up: 2007–08

Blackpool

- Football League Championship play-offs: 2010

Liverpool

- Football League Cup: 2011–12

Dundee FC

- Scottish Premiership play-offs: 2020–21

Individual

- Blackpool Player of the Season: 2009–10
- PFA Team of the Year: 2009–10 Championship
- Football League Championship Player of the Month: January 2010
- SPFL Scottish Championship Player of the Month: December 2020
- PFA Scotland Team of the Year: 2020–21 Scottish Championship
- SPFL Team of the Season: 2020–21 Scottish Championship
- SPFL Scottish Championship Player of the Year: 2020–21
