= Excelsior Stadium =

Football stadium in Airdrie, North Lanarkshire, Scotland

- New Broomfield
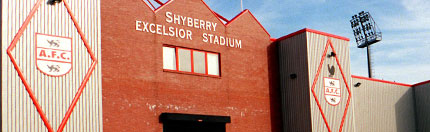

- Location in North Lanarkshire
- Location: Airdrie
- Coordinates: 55°51′35″N 3°57′35″W
- Capacity: 10,101 (all seated)
- Surface: 3G artificial pitch
- Field size: 115 × 75 yds

Construction
- Opened: 1998

Tenants
- Airdrieonians F.C. (1878) (1998–2002); Airdrieonians F.C. (2002–present); Queen's Park F.C. (2013–2014); Glasgow City F.C. (2014–2017); Motherwell F.C. Women (2020–2021); Glasgow University F.C. (2020–present); Celtic F.C. Women (2021–2024); Celtic F.C. B (2021–present)

The Excelsior Stadium, officially The Albert Bartlett Stadium for sponsorship reasons, is a football stadium in Airdrie, North Lanarkshire, Scotland. It is the home ground of Airdrieonians of the Scottish Professional Football League (SPFL). Since the 2021–22 season it has also been used by Celtic for the home matches of their women's team in the Scottish Women's Premier League (SWPL) and B team in the Scottish Lowland Football League, as well as by Glasgow University F.C. of the West of Scotland Football League. It is an all-seater stadium with a capacity of 10,101, and has a 3G artificial surface.

The stadium was opened in 1998 by the original Airdrieonians F.C., who were returning to Airdrie four years after leaving their previous ground, Broomfield Park. The name of the stadium derives from Airdrieonians' original name, the club having been founded as Excelsior F.C. in 1878. For sponsorship reasons the venue was originally known as The Shyberry Excelsior Stadium (after Shyberry Design Ltd. who had sponsored the construction), from 2018 to 2022 as The Penny Cars Stadium and from 2024 as The Albert Bartlett Stadium. The stadium is also sometimes unofficially referred to as New Broomfield, after the former Airdrie ground. Following the liquidation of the original Airdrieonians in 2002, the Excelsior Stadium became home to the new Airdrie United F.C.; they subsequently were permitted to revive the Airdrieonians name.

Other teams to have used the Excelsior Stadium in the past include SWPL teams Glasgow City, as their main home ground between 2014 and 2017, and prior to that for matches in European competitions; and Motherwell, for the 2020–21 season. SPFL club Queen's Park temporarily shared the ground from 2013 to 2014. Both Queen of the South (in 2008) and Motherwell (in 2009) have used the ground for European fixtures. It has also hosted the final of the Scottish Challenge Cup three times.

== History ==
Following the sale of Airdrieonians' home ground Broomfield Park to supermarket chain Safeway in 1994, the club searched for several years for a suitable site, and planning permission for, a new home. Guidelines set by the football authorities in the period were for top division clubs in Scotland to have all-seater stadia with a minimum capacity of 10,000, and having only been relegated from the Scottish Premier Division in 1993, the club sought to comply with this. The building work on Excelsior Stadium was eventually completed in 1998, and Airdrieonians played here until the club went out of business due to heavy debts (caused in part by the burden of the construction cost of the new stadium, and made worse by a fall in supporter numbers in the four years based away from their home town) in May 2002.

This left an opening in the Scottish League, which was filled by Northern Premier League side Gretna. To attain a position in the league, Jim Ballantyne bought out the ailing Clydebank, renamed the club Airdrie United, changed the strip and relocated the club to Airdrie and Excelsior Stadium. Airdrie United are now known as 'Airdrieonians', the same name as the club dissolved in 2002.

The ground seats 10,101 and, as well as hosting Airdrieonians first and youth team games, Motherwell Under 20s games and various local amateur sides, it has also played host to Scottish Challenge Cup finals in 1999 and 2005, as well as Scotland under-21 fixtures and Old Firm reserve matches. The stadium has also hosted several charity events.

In 2003 Falkirk enquired about groundsharing at the stadium for a season, as their former home, Brockville did not meet SPL criteria. This was later rejected in a meeting between SPL chairmen, meaning Falkirk were denied a place in the SPL. In August 2008 it played host to Queen of the South's UEFA Cup 2nd qualifying round 1st leg against Nordsjælland. The stadium also hosted all of Motherwell's Europa League qualifying round ties in the 2009–10 season, against Llanelli, Flamurtari and Steaua Bucharest.

Queen's Park used the Excelsior Stadium as their temporary home ground while Hampden Park was being converted for use as an athletics stadium in the 2014 Commonwealth Games. In women's football, the stadium has been the home ground of Scottish Women's Premier League clubs Glasgow City between 2014 and 2017 and Motherwell during the 2020–21 season. Glasgow University F.C. have also used the ground since joining the new West of Scotland League in 2020. From the 2021–22 season, Celtic F.C. use the ground as the home venue for both their women's team in the SWPL and their B team, who play in the Scottish Lowland Football League.

In January 2016, East Kilbride of the Scottish Lowland Football League drew Celtic in the Scottish Cup. As their K-Park stadium was inadequate for the crowd expected, the match was held at Excelsior Stadium; 7,767 fans attended.

In June 2017 the stadium underwent refurbishment prior to hosting a concert by singer Elton John.

== Records and facts ==
The record attendance at New Broomfield was 9,612 for the 2005 Scottish Challenge Cup Final, played between Hamilton Academical and St Mirren on 6 November 2005. The highest confirmed attendance for an Airdrieonians match was 9,044 for a Scottish League One fixture against Rangers on 23 August 2013; however, one of the first matches at the stadium, a Scottish League Cup win for Airdrie over cup holders Celtic in August 1998 was reported to have been played "before 10,000 ecstatic fans".

== Facilities ==
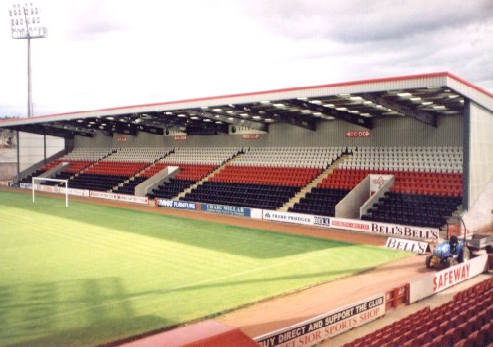
View from the Jack Dalziel Stand towards the South Stand

In addition to the executive match-viewing boxes that look onto the pitch, the stadium boasts conference and banqueting facilities, with six separate spaces and a public bar being situated within the main (Jack Dalziel) stand. Disabled facilities are also provided in the North, East and South stands. A Sports Injury Clinic operates from the main stand and Crossfit have a fitness facility operating out of the North Stand.

Nine five-a-side football pitches were installed for community use in early 2010, adjacent to the stadium on the South stand side and to the East stand side. The car parks were resurfaced, and new fencing and gates were erected around the perimeter of the stadium and land.

At the end of the 2009–10 season, a new 3G artificial surface was installed. Although due for completion prior to season 2010–11, in July Airdrie United played their opening Challenge Cup 1st Round game v Ayr United at Alloa Athletic's Recreation Park ground, as the work had been delayed due to heavy rain. The first competitive game played on the new surface was on 14 August 2010, as Airdrie entertained Ayr United.

Stadium dimensions

== See also ==
- Stadium relocations in Scottish football
