= John Potter (footballer) =

Scottish footballer (born 1979)

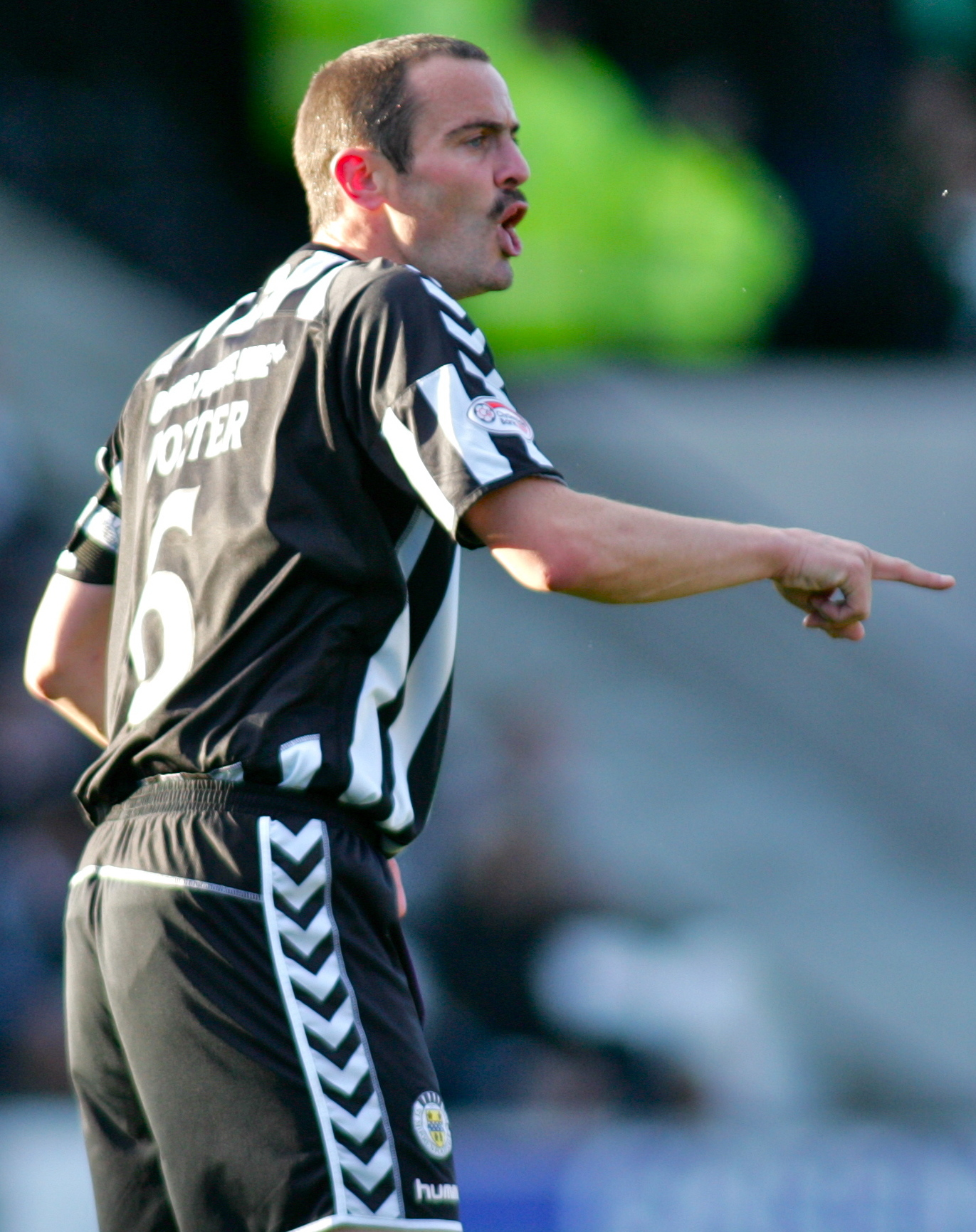
- Potter playing for St Mirren

Personal information
- Date of birth: 15 December 1979 (age 46)
- Place of birth: Dunfermline, Scotland
- Position: Defender

Senior career*
Years	Team	Apps	(Gls)
1997–1999	Celtic	0	(0)
1999–2002	Dunfermline Athletic	25	(1)
2002–2005	Clyde	88	(5)
2005–2011	St Mirren	196	(1)
2011–2016	Dunfermline Athletic	30	(12)
2012	→ Queen of the South (loan)	13	(1)
Total		352	(20)

Managerial career
- 2014–2015: Dunfermline Athletic
- 2022–2023: Kelty Hearts
- * Club domestic league appearances and goals

John Potter (born 15 December 1979) is a Scottish football player and coach, who was most recently interim manager of Scottish Premiership side Hibernian.

Potter played as a defender for Celtic, Dunfermline Athletic (two spells), Clyde, St Mirren and Queen of the South. During his second spell with Dunfermline, Potter took on coaching responsibilities and later had a short spell as manager. He left Dunfermline in 2016 and then worked as a coach for Jack Ross at St Mirren, Sunderland and Hibernian. Potter returned to management with Kelty Hearts, taking charge of them during the 2022–23 season.

Potter was brought up in High Valleyfield; a small mining village which has produced numerous talents in the past including: Hugh Kelly, George Connelly and John Fraser. He is the cousin of Craig Potter and the younger brother of former Raith Rovers goalkeeper, and current Livingston goalkeeping coach, Brian Potter.

== Playing career ==
Potter began his career at Celtic, but failed to make a senior appearance for them. Potter was highly rated at Celtic Park and captained the reserve side, most notably on 16 February 1999, when Mark Viduka made his first appearance in a Celtic shirt in a 4–2 victory against Motherwell. Potter travelled to Portugal with the first team squad and was an unused substitute in Wim Jansen's final game in charge against Sporting Lisbon, but a change in management from Jansen to Josef Venglos signalled the end of Potter's career at the club.

After leaving Celtic, Potter joined hometown team Dunfermline Athletic and spent three years at East End Park. In 2002, he joined Clyde. He made his debut on the same day he joined Clyde, in an evening fixture against Partick Thistle. At the beginning of the 2004–05 season, Potter was appointed captain of Clyde, and started every single game for the Bully Wee that season.

He joined St Mirren in July 2005 and won promotion to the Scottish Premier League in his first season. He also played as St Mirren won the 2005 Scottish Challenge Cup Final against Hamilton Academical. At the beginning of the 2008–09 campaign, Saint's manager Gus MacPherson named Potter as captain, a position he held for three seasons. However, towards the end of the 2010–11 season, Potter - along with 9 other players at St Mirren - was told that his contract would not be renewed and he would be allowed to leave the club on a free transfer.

After seeing out his contract at St Mirren, Potter joined his former St Mirren teammate Paul Gallacher at Dunfermline Athletic, beginning his second spell at the club. He became U20s player/coach assisted by Craig Dargo in 2012.

== Coaching career ==
Potter took control of the Dunfermline Athletic first team in December 2014, after Jim Jefferies left the club. It was announced at the end of the season that, after failing to secure promotion or a play off position, Potter would step down as manager and return to his position as head coach. Although having not played since May 2014, Potter was registered as a player for the Pars during the 2015–16 season, and was an unused substitute in a number of first-team matches.

Potter continued as under 20s manager for Dunfermline into the 2016–17 season, and played for the side in a one-all draw against Inverness under 20s in April 2017. Potter was also linked with becoming assistant manager of St Mirren in October 2016, after former teammate Jack Ross was appointed manager of the Paisley club.

Potter did eventually team up with Ross in June 2018, joining Sunderland as first team coach. He then moved to Hibernian in November 2019, as assistant to Ross. Potter and Ross both left Hibernian in December 2021.

Potter resumed his coaching career in June 2022, becoming the manager of Kelty Hearts. In April 2023, Kelty announced that Potter would be leaving the club at the end of the 2022–23 season.

He was the technical director of Raith Rovers until February 2026. Potter re-joined Hibernian in June 2026 as an assistant coach, and became the interim coach in September after the sacking of David Gray. He oversaw one match as caretaker manager, a 1–1 draw with Aberdeen. He left the club later that month, following the appointment of Marink Reedijk as head coach.

== Managerial statistics ==
As of match played on 19 September 2026

Team	Nat	From	To	Record				
Team	Nat	From	To	G	W	D	L	Win %
Dunfermline Athletic	(Scotland)	16 December 2014	2 May 2015	20	5	6	9	25.00
Kelty Hearts	(Scotland)	8 June 2022	12 May 2023	44	14	10	20	31.82
Hibernian (caretaker)	(Scotland)	16 September 2026	24 September 2026	1	0	1	0	0.00
Total				65	19	17	29	29.23
