= 2005 Scottish Challenge Cup final =

- The match programme cover
- Event: 2005–06 Scottish Challenge Cup
St Mirren	Hamilton Academical
2	1
- Date: 6 November 2005
- Venue: Excelsior Stadium, Airdrie
- Referee: S. Dougal
- Attendance: 9,613

The 2005 Scottish Challenge Cup final, also known as the Bell's Cup final for sponsorship reasons, was an association football match between St Mirren and Hamilton Academical on 6 November 2005 at Excelsior Stadium in Airdrie. It was the 15th final of the Scottish Challenge Cup since it was first organised in 1990 to celebrate the centenary of the Scottish Football League.

St Mirren emerged winners after defeating Hamilton Academical 2–1 with goals from Simon Lappin and John Sutton to win the tournament for the first time after being losing finalists in 1993.

== Route to the final ==
=== St Mirren ===
Round	Opposition	Score
First round	Forfar Athletic (h)	1–0 (a.e.t.)
Second round	Queen of the South (a)	2–1
Quarter-final	Stenhousemuir (h)	3–2
Semi-final	Greenock Morton (h)	0–0 (a.e.t.) (4–2 pen.)

The first round draw paired St Mirren with Forfar Athletic at Love Street with the home team winning 1–0 after extra time. The second round was a trip to Dumfries to face Queen of the South at Palmerston Park with The Buddies producing 2–1 win to progress to the quarter-finals. The opponents drawn were Stenhousemuir at home in the quarter-finals and St Mirren won 3–2. The reward for reaching the semi-final was a home game at against Renfrewshire rivals, Greenock Morton with St Mirren edging out the opponents to win 4–2 on penalties after 0–0 after extra time. St Mirren reached the Scottish Challenge Cup final for the second time, since losing the 1993 final against Falkirk.

=== Hamilton Academical ===
Round	Opposition	Score
First round	Queen's Park (a)	3–0
Second round	Ross County (a)	1–0
Quarter-final	Dundee (h)	2–0
Semi-final	St Johnstone (a)	2–1

Hamilton Academical were drawn against Queen's Park at home in the first round and Hamilton came out 3–0 winners The second round draw saw Accies drawn against Ross County away from home with Hamilton emerging 1–0 winners. The quarter-final draw brought Dundee to New Douglas Park which saw Hamilton produce a 2–0 and awarded Accies their third consecutive clean sheet of the tournament to progress to the semi-finals. The opposition provided in the semi-final draw was St Johnstone and another away game which saw Hamilton triumph with a 2–1 victors to proceed to the Scottish Challenge Cup final for the third time in the club's history since winning both the 1991 and 1992 tournaments.

== Match ==
5 November 2005
15:00 GMT

St Mirren	2–1	Hamilton Academical
Lappin 22'; Sutton 80'	Report	Tunbridge 47'

Excelsior Stadium, Airdrie
Attendance: 9,613
Referee: Stuart Dougal

St Mirren	Hamilton Academical

St Mirren:
GK	1	(Scotland) Chris Smith
RWB	2	(Republic of Ireland) David van Zanten
CB	3	(Scotland) Kirk Broadfoot	Booked
CM	4	(Scotland) Andy Millen		(substituted off) 76'
CB	5	(Scotland) Kevin McGowne (c)
CB	6	(Scotland) John Potter
CM	7	(Scotland) Hugh Murray	Booked
CM	8	(Scotland) Charlie Adam		(substituted off) 69'
CF	9	(Scotland) Stewart Kean
CF	10	(England) John Sutton
LWB	11	(Scotland) Simon Lappin
Substitutes:
FW	12	(England) Billy Mehmet		(substituted on) 69'
DF	14	(Scotland) Alan Reid
MF	15	(Scotland) Mark Corcoran
MF	16	(Scotland) Mark Reilly		(substituted on) 76'
GK	17	(Scotland) Craig Hinchliffe
Manager:
(Scotland) Gus MacPherson

Hamilton Academical:
GK	1	(Scotland) David McEwan
CB	2	(Scotland) Stuart Balmer		(substituted off) 81'
LB	3	(Scotland) Derek Fleming
RB	4	(Scotland) Steven Thomson (c)	Booked
CB	5	(Scotland) Mark McLaughlin
CM	6	(Scotland) Alex Neil
LM	7	(Australia) Scott Tunbridge	Booked
CM	8	(Scotland) Marvyn Wilson
CF	9	(England) Graeme Jones		(substituted off) 38'
RM	10	(Scotland) Scott MacKenzie
CF	11	(Scotland) Pat Keogh		(substituted off) 77'
Substitutes:
DF	12	(Scotland) John Robertson		(substituted on) 81'
MF	14	(Scotland) Brown Ferguson
FW	15	(Scotland) Mark Gilhaney		(substituted on) 77'
FW	16	(Scotland) Brian Carrigan		(substituted on) 38'
GK	17	(Scotland) Raymond Jellema
Manager:
(Scotland) Billy Reid

MATCH RULES

- 90 minutes
- 30 minutes of extra time if necessary
- Penalty shoot-out if scores still level
- Five named substitutes
- Maximum of 3 substitutions
