= John Sutton (footballer) =

English footballer (born 1983)

Personal information
- Full name: John William Michael Sutton
- Date of birth: 26 December 1983 (age 42)
- Place of birth: Norwich, England
- Height: 6 ft 1 in (1.85 m)
- Position: Forward

Youth career
- 2000–2002: Tottenham Hotspur

Senior career*
| Years | Team | Apps | (Gls) |
| 2002–2003 | Tottenham Hotspur | 0 | (0) |
| 2002 | → Carlisle United (loan) | 7 | (1) |
| 2002 | Swindon Town | 1 | (0) |
| 2003–2004 | Raith Rovers | 20 | (13) |
| 2004–2005 | Millwall | 4 | (0) |
| 2004–2005 | → Dundee (loan) | 32 | (8) |
| 2005–2007 | St Mirren | 64 | (25) |
| 2007–2008 | Wycombe Wanderers | 45 | (6) |
| 2008–2011 | Motherwell | 98 | (32) |
| 2011–2013 | Heart of Midlothian | 49 | (11) |
| 2012 | → Central Coast Mariners (loan) | 8 | (1) |
| 2013–2015 | Motherwell | 76 | (34) |
| 2015–2016 | St Johnstone | 21 | (1) |
| 2016–2018 | St Mirren | 51 | (8) |
| 2018–2020 | Greenock Morton | 19 | (2) |
| Total | | 495 | (144) |
- * Club domestic league appearances and goals

John William Michael Sutton (born 26 December 1983) is an English former professional footballer who played as a forward for a number of clubs in England and Scotland as well as Australia during his career, and also represented England at under-15 and under-16 levels.

He is best known for his goal scoring exploits in Scottish football, most notably at Motherwell.

== Career ==
=== Early career ===
Born on 26 December 1983 in Norwich, England, Sutton was a promising youth cricketer, representing Norfolk at various age levels. He was a modest batsman and useful off-spinner of moderate pace. He started his football career as a youth trainee with Tottenham Hotspur and as part of their reserve squad. Whilst playing at under 17 level he scored 25 goals in 26 games. In 2002, he went on loan with Carlisle United (where he scored his first career goal against Cambridge United) before agreeing to be released by Tottenham and signing on a months contract with Swindon Town.

In 2003, Sutton joined Raith Rovers. He made a quick impression at Raith, scoring 13 goals in 20 league appearances for the Scottish First Division club. Several clubs enquired about his availability in January including Valencia where he spent three days on trial, Dundee and English Championship club Millwall, who signed him for £60,000. He failed to make an impression at Millwall, playing just four league matches. He did however contribute to Millwall's run to the 2004 FA Cup Final, coming on as a substitute against Tranmere Rovers in their quarter-final replay.

=== Dundee ===
Sutton returned to Scotland on a season-long loan with Scottish Premier League side Dundee, making his debut on 7 August 2004 in Dundee's 1–0 defeat to Hearts. He scored his first goal for the club the following week netting the winner in the 47th minute in their Dundee derby win over Dundee United. His form proved better back in Scotland, scoring 8 times in 33 league appearances.

=== St Mirren ===
On 31 August 2005, Sutton joined Scottish First Division club St Mirren on a two-year contract, making his debut on 10 September 2005 against Queen of the South, He scored his first goal for the club three days later against Stenhousemuir in the Scottish Challenge Cup. Sutton scored the winning goal for St Mirren in the 2005 Scottish Challenge Cup Final against Hamilton Academical. Sutton was sent off on 26 December against Queen of the South after a challenge with Jim Thomson, although the red card was later rescinded upon appeal. He scored 17 goals in all competitions that season, helping St Mirren win promotion to the Scottish Premier League in his first season.

In total, Sutton made 75 appearances scoring 30 times for the club. With his contract having expired at the end of the season, he became a free agent in May 2007. In an interview with the Daily Record on 5 October 2013, Sutton stated joining St Mirren saved his career saying that the club had the "enthusiasm for the game" he needed.

=== Wycombe Wanderers ===
On 28 June 2007, Sutton signed for Wycombe Wanderers, making his debut on 11 August against Accrington. He scored his first goal for the club on 2 October, against Barnet in their 2–1 defeat. On 19 August 2008, after one season, Sutton's Wycombe contract was cancelled by mutual consent. In all Sutton made 48 appearances scoring six times for the club.

=== Motherwell ===
Sutton then signed for Scottish Premier League club Motherwell on a three-year contract. He scored on his debut against Dundee United on 23 August, and followed it up with a 79th-minute winner against Hibernian a week later. Sutton continued his impressive start to his Motherwell career with a consolation goal against Celtic in a 4–2 defeat, an equaliser against his former club St Mirren and the winner against Falkirk, bringing his total to an impressive five goals in his first six league matches. On 2 February 2009, Sutton scored a brace in Motherwell's 3–0 Scottish Cup victory over Inverurie Loco Works. In his first season, he scored 12 goals in 31 appearances in all competitions.

Motherwell qualified for the 2009–10 Europa League through the FIFA Fair Play Award and were drawn against Welsh club Llanelli in the first-qualifying round. In the first-leg in Scotland, Llanelli shocked The Steelmen 1–0, but Sutton scored twice in the return leg as Motherwell won 3–0 to progress through to the next round, where they were drawn Albanian side Flamurtari Vlorë. In the first-leg in Albania, Sutton scored from the penalty spot early in the match, but the referee ordered a retake, which he missed. There did not seem to be any infringement before the kick was taken and manager Jim Gannon blasted the decision as Flamurtari won 1–0. Sutton's penalty miss did not matter at all, as Well blew the Albanians away in the second leg at Fir Park, winning 8–1, although Sutton did not score in this match either, nor did he score in either leg of the third qualifying round tie with Steaua București, as Motherwell lost 3–0 in Romania and 3–1 at home to go out 6–1 on aggregate. Sutton netted a brace in the historic 6–6 draw with Hibernian on 5 May 2010. He finished the 2009–10 season with a total of 14 goals in 38 appearances.

On 27 February 2011, Sutton scored twice as Motherwell shocked Celtic 2–0 at Fir Park, and on 16 April 2011, he scored a screaming half volley from outside the box in the Scottish Cup Semi-Final against St Johnstone. His final appearance for Motherwell came in the 2011 Scottish Cup Final, losing 3–0 to Celtic at Hampden Park. He finished the season as their top scorer with 17 goals.

=== Heart of Midlothian ===
On 25 May 2011, Sutton signed for Heart of Midlothian (Hearts). Making his debut against Rangers at Ibrox on 23 July, Sutton started the first three matches of the season including Hearts Europa League tie against Paks, in which he won a penalty. His fortunes changed under new manager Paulo Sergio as his appearances became limited to substitute appearances and the odd start prompting doubts about his future at the club, though Sergio denied this. He scored his first goals for the club on 13 August against Aberdeen scoring twice in a 3–0 win in one of his few starts. Despite his lack of games Sergio and Sutton both denied he did not have a future at the club. Sutton came on as a substitute in Hearts 3–1 victory over Hibernian in the Edinburgh derby on 2 January 2012, to assist two goals. In his debut season he made 18 appearances, scoring 3 times before being sent on loan in February 2012, to Australian side Central Coast Mariners.

On his return he played in Hearts four pre-season games scoring three times, becoming Hearts main striker under new manager John McGlynn. Sutton stated on his return that If Sergio was still in charge then I wouldn't be anywhere near the first team. On 4 August 2012, Sutton scored from the penalty spot in a 2–0 win over St Johnstone.

After Hearts entered administration in June 2013, Sutton was made redundant by the club as he refused to accept a pay cut. Following his departure, Sutton explained that he had been told by Hearts that he did not feature in their future plans, insisting he was no traitor to the club, and admitted joining the club was a mistake in the first place.

=== Central Coast Mariners (loan) ===
It was first reported on 26 January, that Australian A-League club Central Coast Mariners were one of several clubs interested in acquiring Sutton on a loan deal. Other clubs that were believed to also be interested were St Mirren and even Edinburgh rivals Hibernian The Mariners soon entered into discussions with the player, in the hope of securing him on a four-month loan as a replacement for recently departed striker Matt Simon, and hoping to fill the void left by youth international Bernie Ibini-Isei who was due to join up with the Australian Under-20s. On 31 January 2012, it was announced that the move had been finalised pending international clearance. On 3 February, it was confirmed Sutton had signed a four-month loan deal and would join up with the squad the following week.

He made his debut on 18 February, starting the match and played 88 minutes before being substituted, against Wellington Phoenix in a 2–0 win. Sutton received a handful of starts, playing in the forward position. He scored his first goal for Central Coast Mariners FC and helped the club win 2–1 against Wellington Phoenix to win the A-League Men Premiership. However, Sutton was unsuccessful helping Central Coast Mariners FC reach the Finals series after losing 5–13 on penalties following a 1–1 draw. At the end of the 2011–12 season, he went on to make ten appearances and scoring once in all competitions. Following this, Sutton returned to his parent club.

=== Motherwell (second spell) ===
After being made redundant by Hearts, Sutton signed for Motherwell for a second time on a two-year contract on 28 June 2013, being handed the number nine shirt. He made his second debut in the first leg of the third qualifying round of the Europa League, in a 2–0 loss against Kuban Krasnodar. Motherwell would be eliminated after Kuban Krasnodar proved to be too strong and failed to win either legs losing 2–0 and 1–0 respectively.

Sutton scored in three straight games against Partick Thistle, Kilmarnock and St Mirren. Two weeks later, on 28 September 2013, he scored his first brace of the season, as Motherwell won 2–0 against Ross County and he scored another against Ross County on 14 December 2013, in a 2–1 win for Motherwell. After sixteen goals in twenty league appearances, in March 2014, manager Stuart McCall described Sutton as the key signing of the season.

Sutton was involved in the 92nd minute winning goal from Craig Reid in the 1–0 league victory at Aberdeen on the last day of the 2013–14 league season on 11 May 2014, a victory which seen Motherwell secure second spot for the second season running, leapfrogging Aberdeen in the process.

Sutton's first goal of the 2014–15 season was the winner in a 2–1 league win at Ross County on 13 September 2014. He then scored his first goal at Celtic Park in the next match, a 1–1 league draw at Celtic on 21 September 2014. Sutton scored in three consecutive league matches in December 2014, in games against Ross County, St Mirren and Partick Thistle. The latter two strikes gave new Well manager Ian Baraclough back-to-back 1–0 victories in his first two games in charge. He registered two more league goals in January 2015, in a defeat at Dundee, and a home draw with St Johnstone Following the return of Scott McDonald, to Motherwell in February 2015, Sutton was forced to settle for a place on the substitutes bench for the remainder of the season, as McDonald regularly partnered Lee Erwin in attack.

Sutton, on as a late second-half substitute in both games, scored back-to-back braces in successive home wins against Hamilton Academical on 20 March 2015, and St Mirren on 7 April 2015. He converted a penalty in a 2–1 defeat at St Mirren in the penultimate league match, a defeat which consigned Motherwell to the Scottish Premiership play-off spot. The club maintained their Premiership with a 6–1 aggregate victory against Rangers in the play-off, with Sutton converting a late penalty in the second leg home win to round off the scoring in a 3–0 win.

He finished the season as top goalscorer at Motherwell again, with 13 goals from 43 appearances.

=== St Johnstone ===
Sutton signed a pre-contract agreement with St Johnstone on 15 June 2015. He was due to sign for St Johnstone on 1 July, after his previous contract was due to expire, but Motherwell granted him an early release on 17 June. Sutton scored on his Saints Premiership debut against former club Heart of Midlothian in a 4–3 defeat for his new club. At the end of the season, he was made available for transfer or loan by St Johnstone.

=== St Mirren (second spell) ===
After leaving St Johnstone, Sutton rejoined Scottish Championship side St Mirren in June 2016, signing a two-year deal with the Paisley side.

Sutton made his second debut in a League Cup group stage win at Livingston on 16 July 2016. He scored his first goal since his return to the club in the Renfrewshire derby against Greenock Morton in a 1–1 home draw on 6 August 2017. Sutton netted four times in total en route to the Challenge Cup final, including registering a very late double against Ayr United in a 2–1 win in the quarter-finals. He played the full match in the final, but Dundee United beat St Mirren 2–1 to win the trophy on 25 March 2017.

Sutton scored on his 100th start for St Mirren (across two spells), also against local rivals Greenock Morton in a 4–1 away victory on 11 April 2017. He was released by St Mirren at the end of his contract.

=== Greenock Morton ===
On 28 June 2019, Sutton came out of retirement, signing a playing contract with Greenock Morton while continuing in his coaching role with the club.

== Later career ==
After leaving St Mirren, Sutton decided to retire from playing and accepted a coaching position with Greenock Morton. He took caretaker charge of the first team in September 2018, along with Derek Anderson.

Sutton later ran a personal training business and was involved in coaching football.

== Personal life ==
Sutton is the son of Mike Sutton and the brother of ex-Celtic striker Chris Sutton.

Sutton is married to a Glaswegian woman and they have twin sons, a son and daughter.

== Career statistics ==
Appearances and goals by club, season and competition
| Club | Season | League | | | National cup | | League cup | | Continental | | Other | | Total | |
| Club | Season | Division | Apps | Goals | Apps | Goals | Apps | Goals | Apps | Goals | Apps | Goals | Apps | Goals |
|---|---|---|---|---|---|---|---|---|---|---|---|---|---|---|
| Tottenham Hotspur | 2002–03 | Premier League | 0 | 0 | 0 | 0 | 0 | 0 | — | | — | | 0 | 0 |
| Carlisle United (loan) | 2002–03 | Third Division | 7 | 1 | 1 | 0 | 0 | 0 | — | | 2 (Note: Appearances in the Football League Trophy) | 0 | 10 | 1 |
| Swindon | 2002–03 | Second Division | 1 | 0 | 0 | 0 | 0 | 0 | — | | 0 | 0 | 1 | 0 |
| Raith Rovers | 2003–04 | Scottish First Division | 20 | 13 | 1 | 0 | 0 | 0 | — | | 3 (Note: Appearances in the Scottish Challenge Cup) | 3 | 24 | 16 |
| Millwall | 2003–04 | First Division | 4 | 0 | 1 | 0 | 0 | 0 | — | | — | | 5 | 0 |
| Millwall | 2004–05 | First Division | 0 | 0 | 0 | 0 | 0 | 0 | 0 | 0 | — | | 0 | 0 |
| Millwall | Total | | 4 | 0 | 1 | 0 | 0 | 0 | 0 | 0 | 0 | 0 | 5 | 0 |
| Dundee (loan) | 2004–05 | Scottish Premier League | 32 | 8 | 1 | 0 | 2 | 0 | — | | — | | 35 | 8 |
| St Mirren | 2005–06 | Scottish First Division | 31 | 14 | 4 | 1 | 1 | 0 | — | | 3 | 2 | 39 | 17 |
| St Mirren | 2006–07 | Scottish Premier League | 33 | 11 | 1 | 1 | 2 | 1 | — | | — | | 36 | 13 |
| St Mirren | Total | | 64 | 25 | 5 | 2 | 3 | 1 | 0 | 0 | 3 | 2 | 75 | 30 |
| Wycombe Wanderers | 2007–08 | League Two | 45 | 6 | 1 | 0 | 1 | 0 | — | | 1 | 0 | 48 | 6 |
| Motherwell | 2008–09 | Scottish Premier League | 28 | 10 | 2 | 2 | 1 | 0 | 2 (Note: Appearances in the UEFA Cup) | 0 | — | | 33 | 12 |
| Motherwell | 2009–10 | Scottish Premier League | 35 | 12 | 1 | 0 | 0 | 0 | 6 (Note: Appearances in the UEFA Europa League) | 2 | — | | 42 | 14 |
| Motherwell | 2010–11 | Scottish Premier League | 35 | 10 | 6 | 6 | 3 | 0 | 6 | 1 | — | | 50 | 17 |
| Motherwell | Total | | 98 | 32 | 9 | 8 | 4 | 0 | 14 | 3 | 0 | 0 | 125 | 43 |
| Heart of Midlothian | 2011–12 | Scottish Premier League | 14 | 3 | 0 | 0 | 1 | 0 | 3 | 0 | — | | 18 | 3 |
| Heart of Midlothian | 2012–13 | Scottish Premier League | 35 | 9 | 3 | 0 | 1 | 0 | 2 | 0 | — | | 41 | 9 |
| Heart of Midlothian | Total | | 49 | 12 | 3 | 0 | 2 | 0 | 5 | 0 | 0 | 0 | 59 | 12 |
| Central Coast Mariners (loan) | 2011–12 | A-League | 8 | 1 | 0 | 0 | 0 | 0 | 2 (Note: Appearances in the AFC Champions League) | 0 | 0 | 0 | 10 | 1 |
| Motherwell | 2013–14 | Scottish Premiership | 38 | 22 | 1 | 0 | 1 | 0 | 1 | 0 | — | | 41 | 22 |
| Motherwell | 2014–15 | Scottish Premiership | 38 | 12 | 1 | 0 | 1 | 0 | 2 | 0 | 1 (Note: Appearance in the Premiership play-offs) | 1 | 43 | 13 |
| Motherwell | Total | | 76 | 34 | 2 | 0 | 2 | 0 | 3 | 0 | 1 | 1 | 84 | 35 |
| St Johnstone | 2015–16 | Scottish Premiership | 21 | 1 | 1 | 0 | 1 | 0 | 1 | 0 | — | | 24 | 1 |
| St Mirren | 2016–17 | Scottish Championship | 35 | 7 | 4 | 2 | 4 | 0 | — | | 5 | 4 | 48 | 13 |
| St Mirren | 2017–18 | Scottish Championship | 16 | 1 | 1 | 0 | 3 | 0 | — | | 1 | 1 | 21 | 2 |
| St Mirren | Total | | 51 | 8 | 5 | 2 | 7 | 0 | 0 | 0 | 6 | 5 | 69 | 15 |
| Greenock Morton | 2019–20 | Scottish Championship | 19 | 2 | 3 | 0 | 5 | 2 | — | | 1 | 1 | 28 | 5 |
| Career total | | | 495 | 143 | 33 | 12 | 27 | 3 | 25 | 3 | 17 | 12 | 597 | 173 |

== Honours ==
St Mirren

- Scottish First Division: 2005–06
- Scottish Championship: 2017–18
- Scottish Challenge Cup: 2005–06; runner–up 2016–17
- Renfrewshire Cup: 2006–07

Motherwell

- Scottish Cup runner–up: 2010–11
- Scottish Premiership runner–up: 2013–14

Heart of Midlothian

- Scottish League Cup runner–up: 2012–13

Central Coast Mariners

- A-League Premiers: 2011–12

Individual

- Scottish Football League Young Player of the Month: August 2003, November 2005
- Scottish Football League Player of the Month: March 2006
- Scottish Challenge Cup Player of the Round: 5th Round, 2016–17
- Motherwell FC top goalscorer: 2010–11, 2013–14, 2014–15
- Raith Rovers FC top goalscorer: 2003–04
