= 2009–10 Southampton F.C. season =

Southampton F.C.
2009–10 season
- Chairman: Nicola Cortese
- Manager: Alan Pardew
- Stadium: St Mary's Stadium
- League One: 7th
- FA Cup: Fifth Round
- League Cup: Second Round
- Football League Trophy: Winners
- Top goalscorer: League: Rickie Lambert (29); All: Rickie Lambert (35)
- Highest home attendance: 31,385 vs Portsmouth (13 February 2010)
- Lowest home attendance: 16,402 vs Wycombe Wanderers (1 December 2009)
- Average home league attendance: 20,108
Home colours	Away colours

The 2009–10 season was Southampton's fifth consecutive season in The Football League and their first season in League One. Having been relegated the previous season, Southampton looked to reclaim their place in the Championship by being promoted in 2009–10. On 28 March 2010, The Saints won the League Trophy for the first time, defeating Carlisle United 4–1 at Wembley. On 25 April, however, Southampton's hopes of a playoff place were ended after Huddersfield Town beat bottom-place side Stockport County 6–0 to claim the final place. The Saints eventually finished in 7th position, just one place and seven points below the play-offs.

== Administration and change of ownership ==
The club ended the previous season with its parent company, Southampton Leisure Holdings PLC in administration. As a result the club entered the 2009–10 season with a ten-point deduction imposed by The Football League.

On 8 July 2009 the administrators confirmed that the club had been sold to a buyer "owned and controlled by Markus Liebherr". On 9 July 2009 Mark Wotte was sacked as Head Coach with Stewart Henderson taking temporary charge. The club confirmed that the search for the new manager had already begun. They said in a statement that the decision is part of a wider strategic plan being implemented to improve all aspects of the club's operations, both on and off the field.

On 17 July 2009 the club confirmed the appointment of Alan Pardew as the new First Team Manager. On the opening day of the season Saints forced a 1–1 draw against Millwall, with Matthew Paterson netting the club's first goal in League One. Following this, the Saints made their first big signing under Markus Liebherr as they unveiled new striker Rickie Lambert who was purchased on 10 August 2009, for an initial £800,000, which could rise to £1m subject to appearances, from fellow League One side Bristol Rovers.

Liebherr also brought in Italian businessman Nicola Cortese to look after the club's business interests on his behalf.

As well as Rickie Lambert, Pardew was given the funds to complete a string of other signings to rebuild the squad including: Dean Hammond, Radhi Jaïdi, Graeme Murty, Dan Harding, David Connolly, Michail Antonio, Papa Waigo, Lee Barnard, José Fonte, Danny Seaborne, Jon Otsemobor and Jason Puncheon, meaning that by the end of the January transfer window, Southampton had spent over £3 million on players, a significantly larger amount than any other League one club.

== Pre-season ==
4 July 2009 Friendly	Eastleigh	1–1	Southampton	Eastleigh
15:00 BST	Taggart 89'	Report	Paterson 59'	Stadium: Silverlake Stadium; Attendance: 1,714; Referee: Pete Lavelle

7 July 2009 Friendly	Totton	2–2	Southampton	Totton
19:45 BST	Osman 83'; Faithfull 90'	Report	Richardson 31' (o.g.); McNish 81'	Stadium: Testwood Park; Attendance: 1,746

11 July 2009 Friendly	Bournemouth	2–1	Southampton	Bournemouth
15:00 BST	Feeney 56'; Igoe 60'	Report	Paterson 51'	Stadium: Dean Court; Referee: G. Scott

14 July 2009 Friendly	Cheltenham Town	0–0	Southampton	Cheltenham
19:45 BST		Report		Stadium: Whaddon Road; Referee: G. Scott

18 July 2009 Ted Bates Trophy	Southampton	1–4	Ajax	Southampton
	Mills 15'	Report	Suárez 24' (pen.), 53' de Jong 81'; Zeegelaar 83'	Stadium: St Mary's Stadium

25 July 2009 Friendly	Southampton	3–0	Heart of Midlothian	Southampton
	Lallana 13'; Rasiak 64', 78'	Report		Stadium: St Mary's Stadium; Attendance: 5,158; Referee: Steve Tanner

1 August 2009 Friendly	Queens Park Rangers	3–0	Southampton	London
	Gorkšs 8'; Balanta 34'; Taarabt 70'	Report		Stadium: Loftus Road; Attendance: 3,164; Referee: P. Crossley

== League One ==
8 August 2009 1	Southampton	1–1	Millwall	Southampton
12:45 BST	Paterson 51'		Abdou 67'	Stadium: St Mary's Stadium; Attendance: 20,103; Referee: Mike Russell

15 August 2009 2	Huddersfield Town	3–1	Southampton	Huddersfield
	Rhodes 50', 68'; Kay 82'		Lambert 53'	Stadium: Galpharm Stadium; Attendance: 12,449; Referee: Andy Haines

18 August 2009 3	Swindon Town	1–0	Southampton	Swindon
	Morrison 9'			Stadium: County Ground; Attendance: 11,673; Referee: Steven Cook

22 August 2009 4	Southampton	1–1	Brentford	Southampton
	Harding 73'		Taylor 83'	Stadium: St Mary's Stadium; Attendance: 19,169; Referee: David Phillips

29 August 2009 5	Stockport County	1–1	Southampton	Stockport
	Baker 90' (pen.)		Lambert 45' (pen.)	Stadium: Edgeley Park; Attendance: 4,680; Referee: Carl Boyeson

5 September 2009 6	Southampton	0–0	Colchester United	Southampton
				Stadium: St Mary's Stadium; Attendance: 17,070; Referee: Graham Scott

12 September 2009 7	Charlton Athletic	1–1	Southampton	London
	Burton 49'		Lallana 42'	Stadium: The Valley; Attendance: 19,441; Referee: Kevin Wright

19 September 2009 8	Southampton	2–0	Yeovil Town	Southampton
	Lambert 19' (pen.), 52' (pen.)			Stadium: St Mary's Stadium; Attendance: 19,907; Referee: Tony Bates

26 September 2009 9	Carlisle United	1–1	Southampton	Carlisle
	Dobie 69'		Jaïdi 90'	Stadium: Brunton Park; Attendance: 7,000; Referee: Graham Salisbury

29 September 2009 10	Southampton	2–3	Bristol Rovers	Southampton
	Lallana 34'; Waigo 46'		Dickson 42'; Kuffour 65'; Williams 90'	Stadium: St Mary's Stadium; Attendance: 19,724; Referee: Darren Deadman

3 October 2009 11	Southampton	4–1	Gillingham	Southampton
	Lambert 13'; Waigo 35'; Lallana 44', 74'		Rooney 27'	Stadium: St Mary's Stadium; Attendance: 19,457; Referee: Stuart Attwell

9 October 2009 12	Southend United	1–3	Southampton	Southend
	Friend 27'		Trotman 6'; Lallana 32', 45'	Stadium: Roots Hall; Attendance: 8,281; Referee: Grant Hegley

17 October 2009 13	Oldham Athletic	1–3	Southampton	Manchester
	Abbott 65'		Hammond 12'; Lambert 23'; Connolly 82'	Stadium: Boundary Park; Attendance: 5,341; Referee: Dave Foster

24 October 2009 14	Southampton	3–1	Milton Keynes Dons	Southampton
	Hammond 56'; Lambert 74'; Connolly 90'		Puncheon 45'	Stadium: St Mary's Stadium; Attendance: 21,387; Referee: Mike Russell

31 October 2009 15	Leyton Orient	2–2	Southampton	London
	Mkandawire 2'; Trotman 56' (o.g.)		Lambert 74', 84'	Stadium: Brisbane Road; Attendance: 7,544; Referee: James Linington

15 November 2009 16	Southampton	1–3	Brighton & Hove Albion	Southampton
16:30 GMT	Lambert 44' (pen.)		Murray 16', 22'; Crofts 86'	Stadium: St Mary's Stadium; Attendance: 21,932; Referee: Kevin Friend

21 November 2009 17	Southampton	2–2	Norwich City	Southampton
	Lallana 11'; Connolly 65'		Hoolahan 54'; Hughes 75'	Stadium: St Mary's Stadium; Attendance: 21,362; Referee: Andy Penn

24 November 2009 18	Hartlepool United	1–3	Southampton	Hartlepool
	Monkhouse 16'		Lallana 29', 53'; Lambert 82'	Stadium: Victoria Park; Attendance: 3,818; Referee: Neil Swarbrick

1 December 2009 19	Southampton	1–0	Wycombe Wanderers	Southampton
	Lambert 41'			Stadium: St Mary's Stadium; Attendance: 16,402; Referee: Dean Whitestone

5 December 2009 20	Walsall	1–3	Southampton	Walsall
	Byfield 66'		Connolly 32'; Hammond 38'; Lambert 65'	Stadium: Bescot Stadium; Attendance: 5,681; Referee: Craig Pawson

12 December 2009 21	Southampton	3–0	Tranmere Rovers	Southampton
	Harding 51'; Lambert 64' (pen.), 70'			Stadium: St Mary's Stadium; Attendance: 19,800; Referee: Danny McDermid

19 December 2009 22	Leeds United	1–0	Southampton	Leeds
	Snodgrass 77'			Stadium: Elland Road; Attendance: 25,498; Referee: Nigel Miller

26 December 2009 23	Southampton	3–1	Exeter City	Southampton
	James 14'; Trotman 30'; Waigo 88'		Taylor 68'	Stadium: St Mary's Stadium; Attendance: 30,890; Referee: Graham Horwood

28 December 2009 24	Colchester United	2–1	Southampton	Colchester
	Wordsworth 23'; Gillespie 75'		Lambert 90' (pen.)	Stadium: Colchester Community Stadium; Attendance: 8,514; Referee: Darren Deadman

16 January 2010 25	Millwall	1–1	Southampton	London
	Trotter 90'		Lambert 90'	Stadium: The Den; Attendance: 11,524; Referee: Andy Woolmer

26 January 2010 26	Brentford	1–1	Southampton	London
	Legge 83'		James 4'	Stadium: Griffin Park; Attendance: 6,501; Referee: Chris Sarginson

30 January 2010 27	Southampton	2–0	Stockport County	Southampton
	Lambert 63'; Waigo 69'			Stadium: St Mary's Stadium; Attendance: 18,308; Referee: Fred Graham

6 February 2010 28	Exeter City	1–1	Southampton	Exeter
	Taylor 49'		Lallana 37'	Stadium: St James Park; Attendance: 7,654; Referee: Mark Haywood

20 February 2010 29	Norwich City	0–2	Southampton	Norwich
			Barnard 33', 77'	Stadium: Carrow Road; Attendance: 23,103; Referee: Russell Booth

23 February 2010 30	Wycombe Wanderers	0–0	Southampton	High Wycombe
				Stadium: Adams Park; Attendance: 6,232; Referee: Darren Deadman

27 February 2010 31	Southampton	5–1	Walsall	Southampton
	Puncheon 8'; Barnard 33', 36'; Lambert 61'; Lallana 89'		Richards 3'	Stadium: St Mary's Stadium; Attendance: 20,461; Referee: Graham Scott

2 March 2010 32	Southampton	5–0	Huddersfield Town	Southampton
	Lambert 16'; Barnard 24'; Puncheon 34'; Hammond 76'; Waigo 84'			Stadium: St Mary's Stadium; Attendance: 19,821; Referee: Pat Miller

6 March 2010 33	Tranmere Rovers	2–1	Southampton	Birkenhead
	Broomes 3'; Thomas-Moore 85' (pen.)		Barnard 12'	Stadium: Prenton Park; Attendance: 6,187; Referee: Peter Quinn

13 March 2010 34	Southampton	1–0	Leeds United	Southampton
	Harding 25'			Stadium: St Mary's Stadium; Attendance: 30,794; Referee: Peter Walton

16 March 2010 35	Southampton	0–1	Swindon Town	Southampton
			Austin 56'	Stadium: St Mary's Stadium; Attendance: 20,752; Referee: Keith Hill

20 March 2010 36	Milton Keynes Dons	0–3	Southampton	Milton Keynes
			Lambert 48', 69' (pen.), 76'	Stadium: Stadium mk Attendance: 10,570; Referee: Colin Webster

23 March 2010 37	Southampton	3–2	Hartlepool United	Southampton
	Barnard 13'; Lambert 38'; Waigo 56'		Monkhouse 10'; Austin 57'	Stadium: St Mary's Stadium; Attendance: 18,072; Referee: Andy D'Urso

1 April 2010 38	Brighton & Hove Albion	2–2	Southampton	Brighton
	Bennett 12'; Barnes 66'		Hammond 41'; Barnard 89'	Stadium: Withdean Stadium; Attendance: 7,784; Referee: Steve Tanner

5 April 2010 39	Southampton	2–1	Leyton Orient	Southampton
15:00 GMT	Lallana 41', 54'		Spicer 2'	Stadium: St Mary's Stadium; Attendance: 21,559; Referee: Gavin Ward

10 April 2010 40	Southampton	1–0	Charlton Athletic	Southampton
	Antonio 34'			Stadium: St Mary's Stadium; Attendance: 23,061; Referee: Grant Hegley

13 April 2010 41	Bristol Rovers	1–5	Southampton	Bristol
	Hughes 24' (pen.)		Lambert 43', 45'; Schneiderlin 53'; Lallana 73'; Puncheon 75'	Stadium: Memorial Stadium; Attendance: 8,607; Referee: Phil Crossley

17 April 2010 42	Yeovil Town	0–1	Southampton	Yeovil
			Barnard 90'	Stadium: Huish Park; Attendance: 7,484; Referee: Oliver Langford

20 April 2010 43	Southampton	0–0	Oldham Athletic	Southampton
				Stadium: St Mary's Stadium; Attendance: 18,366; Referee: Kevin Wright

24 April 2010 44	Southampton	3–2	Carlisle United	Southampton
	Antonio 45', 52'; Lambert 46'		Harte 45'; Madine 90'	Stadium: St Mary's Stadium; Attendance: 18,908; Referee: Simon Hooper

1 May 2010 45	Gillingham	2–1	Southampton	Gillingham
	Howe 19'; Gowling 51'		Connolly 65'	Stadium: Priestfield Stadium; Attendance: 9,504; Referee: Mike Russell

8 May 2010 46	Southampton	3–1	Southend United	Southampton
	Lambert 58', 85' (pen.); Lallana 90'		Moussa 56'	Stadium: St Mary's Stadium; Attendance: 25,289; Referee: Rob Shoebridge

Round	1	2	3	4	5	6	7	8	9	10	11	12	13	14	15	16	17	18	19	20	21	22	23	24	25	26	27	28	29	30	31	32	33	34	35	36	37	38	39	40	41	42	43	44	45	46
Ground	H	A	A	H	A	H	A	H	A	H	H	A	A	H	A	H	H	A	H	A	H	A	H	A	A	A	H	A	A	A	H	H	A	H	H	A	H	A	H	H	A	A	H	H	A	H
Result	D	L	L	D	D	D	D	W	D	L	W	W	W	W	D	L	D	W	W	W	W	L	W	L	D	D	W	D	W	D	W	W	L	W	L	W	W	D	W	W	W	W	D	W	L	W
Position	24	24	24	24	24	24	24	24	24	24	24	24	23	22	22	22	22	21	20	15	14	15	12	13	13	15	11	12	12	11	11	10	10	10	10	10	10	10	9	9	8	8	8	7	7	7

Updated to match(es) played on 8 May 2010. Source: statto.com
A = Away; H = Home; W = Win; D = Draw; L = Loss

Pos	Team	Pld	W	D	L	GF	GA	GD	Pts	Promotion, qualification or relegation
5	Swindon Town	46	22	16	8	73	57	+16	82	Qualification for League One play-offs
6	Huddersfield Town	46	23	11	12	82	56	+26	80	Qualification for League One play-offs
7	Southampton	46	23	14	9	85	47	+38	73 (Note: Southampton were given a ten-point deduction for breaching insolvency regulations, regarding their holding company. As they finished in the bottom three of the Championship last season, the points deduction were applied in the 2009–10 season.)	
8	Colchester United	46	20	12	14	64	52	+12	72	
9	Brentford	46	14	20	12	55	52	+3	62	

Source: The Football League
Rules for classification: 1) points; 2) goal difference; 3) number of goals scored.

== FA Cup ==
6 November 2009 Round 1	Bristol Rovers	2–3	Southampton	Bristol
19:45 GMT	Duffy 73'; Hughes 90' (pen.)	Report	Connolly 63', 68'; Antonio 70'	Stadium: Memorial Stadium; Attendance: 6,446; Referee: Keith Hill

28 November 2009 Round 2	Northampton Town	2–3	Southampton	Northampton
15:00 GMT	Hammond 68' (o.g.); Gilligan 90' (pen.)	Report	Waigo 41'; Lallana 43'; Hammond 59'	Stadium: Sixfields Stadium; Attendance: 4,858; Referee: Steve Tanner

2 January 2010 Round 3	Southampton	1–0	Luton Town	Southampton
15:00 GMT	Lambert 36'	Report		Stadium: St Mary's Stadium; Attendance: 18,786; Referee: Gavin Ward

23 January 2010 Round 4	Southampton	2–1	Ipswich Town	Southampton
15:00 GMT	Thomas 31'; Antonio 74'	Report	Couñago 90'	Stadium: St Mary's Stadium; Attendance: 20,446; Referee: Andy Hall

13 February 2010 Round 5	Southampton	1–4	Portsmouth	Southampton
12:30 GMT	Lambert 70'	Report	Owusu-Abeyie 66'; Dindane 75'; Belhadj 82'; O'Hara 85'	Stadium: St Mary's Stadium; Attendance: 31,385; Referee: Howard Webb

== League Cup ==
11 August 2009 Round 1	Southampton	2–0	Northampton Town	Southampton
19:45 GMT	Lambert 29'; Lallana 68'	Report		Stadium: St Mary's Stadium; Attendance: 10,921; Referee: Simon Hooper

25 August 2009 Round 2	Southampton	1–2	Birmingham City	Southampton
19:45 GMT	Lallana 51'	Report	Bowyer 77'; Carsley 80'	Stadium: St Mary's Stadium; Attendance: 11,753; Referee: Phil Crossley

== League Trophy ==
6 October 2009 Round 2	Southampton	2–2 (5–3 p)	Torquay United	Southampton
19:00 BST	Waigo 59', 69'	Report	Sills 21'; Wroe 42' (pen.)	Stadium: St Mary's Stadium; Attendance: 9,319; Referee: Trevor Kettle
	Penalties
	Lambert (penalty scored); Waigo (penalty scored); James (penalty scored); Mills (penalty scored); Wotton (penalty scored)		(penalty scored) Wroe; (penalty scored) Robertson; (penalty missed) Nicholson; (penalty scored) Mansell

11 November 2009 Area Quarter-Final	Southampton	2–1	Charlton Athletic	Southampton
19:45 GMT	Thomas 34'; Lambert 63'	Report	McKenzie 90'	Stadium: St Mary's Stadium; Attendance: 13,906; Referee: Paul Taylor

15 December 2009 Area Semi-Final	Southampton	2–2 (6–5 p)	Norwich City	Southampton
19:45 GMT	Waigo 14', 90'	Report	Doherty 33'; C. Martin 55'	Stadium: St Mary's Stadium; Attendance: 15,453; Referee: Kevin Wright
	Penalties
	Lambert (penalty scored); Waigo (penalty scored); James (penalty missed); Lallana (penalty scored); Wotton (penalty scored); Hammond (penalty scored); Antonio (penalty missed); Thomas (penalty scored)		(penalty scored) Holt; (penalty scored) R. Martin; (penalty scored) C. Martin; (penalty missed) Nelson; (penalty scored) Russell; (penalty scored) Otsemobor; (penalty missed) Gill; (penalty missed) McDonald

20 January 2010 Area Final; Leg 1	Milton Keynes Dons	0–1	Southampton	Milton Keynes
19:00 GMT		Report	Antonio 26'	Stadium: Stadium mk Attendance: 7,918; Referee: Jonathan Moss

9 February 2010 Area Final; Leg 2	Southampton	3–1 (4–1 agg.)	Milton Keynes Dons	Southampton
GMT	Lambert 15'; Woodards 30' (o.g.); Lallana 87'	Report	Randall 44'	Stadium: St Mary's Stadium; Attendance: 29,901; Referee: Grant Hegley

28 March 2010 Final	Carlisle United	1–4	Southampton	London
13:30 GMT	Madine 84'	[Report]	Lambert 15' (pen.); Lallana 44'; Waigo 50'; Antonio 60'	Stadium: Wembley Stadium; Attendance: 73,476; Referee: Scott Mathieson

== Squad statistics ==
No.	Pos.	Nat.	Name	League		FA Cup		League Cup		League Trophy		Total		Discipline	
No.	Pos.	Nat.	Name	Apps.	Goals	Apps.	Goals	Apps.	Goals	Apps.	Goals	Apps.	Goals	Yellow card	Red card
1	GK	(England)	Kelvin Davis	40	0	4	0	2	0	4	0	50	0	5	0
2	DF	(England)	Dan Harding	42	3	4	0	2	0	5	1	53	4	8	0
3	DF	(England)	Wayne Thomas	10(5)	0	4	1	2	0	4(1)	1	20(6)	2	6	0
4	MF	(England)	Jason Puncheon	19	3	0	0	0	0	0	0	0	0	4	0
5	DF	(England)	Chris Perry	11(1)	0	4	0	1	0	3(1)	0	19(2)	0	2	0
6	DF	(Tunisia)	Radhi Jaïdi	26(1)	1	4	0	0	0	3	0	33(1)	1	5	0
7	FW	(England)	Rickie Lambert	44(1)	29	5	2	2	1	6	3	57(1)	35	2	0
8	MF	(England)	Simon Gillett	0(2)	0	0(1)	0	0(1)	0	1(1)	0	1(5)	0	0	0
9	FW	(Senegal)	Papa Waigo	11(24)	6	3	1	0	0	4(2)	4	18(26)	11	3	0
10	MF	(England)	Paul Wotton	12(14)	0	2(1)	0	2	0	3(2)	0	19(17)	0	0	0
11	MF	(England)	Lee Holmes	2(3)	0	1(1)	0	0	0	0(1)	0	3(5)	0	1	0
12	DF	(Portugal)	José Fonte	21	0	0	0	0	0	3	0	24	0	5	0
13	GK	(England)	Tommy Forecast	0	0	0	0	0	0	0	0	0	0	0	0
14	MF	(England)	Dean Hammond	40	5	4	1	0	0	5	0	49	6	8	0
16	DF	(Scotland)	Graeme Murty	5(1)	0	1	0	2	0	0	0	8(1)	0	0	0
17	FW	(England)	Lee Barnard	14(6)	9	1(1)	0	0	0	0	0	15(7)	9	3	0
18	DF	(England)	Joseph Mills	8(8)	0	1(2)	0	0	0	2(1)	0	11(11)	0	3	0
19	MF	(France)	Morgan Schneiderlin	35(2)	1	4	0	1(1)	0	4	0	44(3)	1	8	2
20	MF	(England)	Adam Lallana	44	15	5	1	2	2	5	2	56	20	4	0
21	MF	(Wales)	Anthony Pulis	0	0	0	0	0	0	0	0	0	0	0	0
23	MF	(Wales)	Lloyd James	28(2)	2	3	0	2	0	4(1)	0	37(3)	2	5	0
24	FW	(Wales)	Kayne McLaggon	0	0	0	0	0	0	0	0	0	0	0	0
26	FW	(Trinidad and Tobago)	Jake Thomson	0(4)	0	0	0	0(1)	0	0	0	0(5)	0	0	0
27	FW	(England)	Jamie White	0	0	0	0	0	0	0	0	0	0	0	0
28	GK	(Poland)	Bartosz Białkowski	6(1)	0	1	0	0	0	2	0	9(1)	0	0	0
29	MF	(England)	Oscar Gobern	0(4)	0	0(2)	0	0(1)	0	0	0	0(7)	0	1	0
30	MF	(England)	Jack Boyle	0	0	0	0	0	0	0	0	0	0	0	0
31	MF	(Wales)	Ryan Doble	0	0	0	0	0	0	0	0	0	0	0	0
32	GK	(Slovenia)	Andrej Pernecký	0	0	0	0	0	0	0	0	0	0	0	0
33	DF	(England)	Jack Saville	0	0	0	0	0	0	0	0	0	0	0	0
34	MF	(England)	Callum McNish	0(1)	0	0	0	0	0	0	0	0(1)	0	0	0
35	DF	(England)	Danny Seaborne	11(5)	0	0	0	0	0	0	0	11(5)	0	1	0
36	MF	(Wales)	Garyn Preen	0	0	0	0	0	0	0	0	0	0	0	0
37	MF	(England)	Michail Antonio	14(14)	3	3(2)	2	0	0	5(1)	2	22(17)	7	2	0
38	FW	(Republic of Ireland)	David Connolly	9(11)	5	1	2	0	0	1(1)	0	11(12)	7	1	0
40	DF	(England)	Jon Otsemobor	19	0	0	0	0	0	0	0	19	0	0	0
41	MF	(England)	Alex Oxlade-Chamberlain	0(2)	0	0	0	0	0	0	0	0(2)	0	0	0
44	MF	(England)	Ben Reeves	0	0	0	0	0	0	0	0	0	0	0	0
Players with appearances who finished their season out on loan
15	DF	(England)	Olly Lancashire	1(1)	0	0(2)	0	1	0	0	0	2(3)	0	0	0
22	DF	(England)	Lee Molyneux	0	0	0	0	0	0	0	0	0	0	0	0
25	GK	(England)	Michael Poke	0	0	0	0	0	0	0	0	0	0	0	0
39	DF	(England)	Aaron Martin	2	0	0	0	0	0	0	0	2	0	1	0
Players with appearances who left the club before the end of the season
4	FW	(Poland)	Marek Saganowski	3(3)	0	0	0	1	0	0(1)	0	4(4)	0	0	0
9	FW	(Poland)	Grzegorz Rasiak	1(2)	0	0	0	0(1)	0	0	0	1(3)	0	0	0
12	DF	(England)	Neal Trotman	17(1)	2	0	0	0	0	1(1)	0	18(2)	2	6	0
17	FW	(Scotland)	Matt Paterson	4(3)	1	0(1)	0	1(1)	0	0	0	5(5)	1	2	0
35	MF	(England)	Jacob Mellis	7(5)	0	0	0	1	0	1(1)	0	9(6)	0	1	0

=== Most appearances ===
	Pos.	Nat.	Name	League		FA Cup		League Cup		League Trophy		Total		
	Pos.	Nat.	Name	Strt.	Sub.	Strt.	Sub.	Strt.	Sub.	Strt.	Sub.	Strt.	Sub.	Total
1	FW	(England)	Rickie Lambert	44	1	5	0	2	0	6	0	57	1	58
2	MF	(England)	Adam Lallana	44	0	5	0	2	0	5	0	56	0	56
3	DF	(England)	Dan Harding	42	0	4	0	2	0	5	0	53	0	53
4	GK	(England)	Kelvin Davis	40	0	4	0	2	0	4	0	50	0	50
5	MF	(England)	Dean Hammond	40	0	4	0	0	0	5	0	49	0	49
6	MF	(France)	Morgan Schneiderlin	35	2	4	0	1	1	4	0	44	3	47
7	FW	(Senegal)	Papa Waigo	11	24	3	0	0	0	4	2	18	26	44
8	MF	(Wales)	Lloyd James	28	2	3	0	2	0	4	1	37	3	40
9	MF	(England)	Michail Antonio	14	14	3	2	0	0	5	1	22	17	39
10	MF	(England)	Paul Wotton	12	14	2	1	2	0	3	2	19	17	36

=== Top goalscorers ===
	Pos.	Nat.	Name	League		FA Cup		League Cup		League Trophy		Total		
	Pos.	Nat.	Name	Gls.	Apps.	Gls.	Apps.	Gls.	Apps.	Gls.	Apps.	Gls.	Apps.	GPG
1	FW	(England)	Rickie Lambert	29	45	2	5	1	2	3	6	35	58	0.60
2	MF	(England)	Adam Lallana	15	44	1	5	2	2	2	5	20	56	0.35
3	FW	(Senegal)	Papa Waigo	6	35	1	3	0	0	4	6	11	44	0.25
4	FW	(England)	Lee Barnard	9	20	0	2	0	0	0	0	9	22	0.40
5	FW	(Republic of Ireland)	David Connolly	5	20	2	1	0	0	0	2	7	23	0.30
5	MF	(England)	Michail Antonio	3	28	2	5	0	0	2	6	7	39	0.17
7	MF	(England)	Dean Hammond	5	40	1	4	0	0	0	5	6	49	0.12
8	DF	(England)	Dan Harding	3	42	0	4	0	2	1	5	4	53	0.07
9	MF	(England)	Jason Puncheon	3	19	0	0	0	0	0	0	3	19	0.15
10	DF	(England)	Neal Trotman	2	18	0	0	0	0	0	2	2	20	0.10
10	DF	(England)	Wayne Thomas	0	15	1	4	0	2	1	5	2	26	0.07
10	MF	(Wales)	Lloyd James	2	30	0	3	0	2	0	5	2	40	0.05

== Transfers ==
Players transferred in
Date	Pos.	Name	Club	Fee	Ref.
10 August 2009	FW	(England) Rickie Lambert	(England) Bristol Rovers	£1 million	
19 August 2009	MF	(England) Dean Hammond	(England) Colchester United	Undisclosed	
4 November 2009	DF	(England) Aaron Martin	(England) Eastleigh	Undisclosed	
9 January 2010	DF	(Portugal) José Fonte	(England) Crystal Palace	Undisclosed	
13 January 2010	DF	(England) Danny Seaborne	(England) Exeter City	Undisclosed	
14 January 2010	DF	(England) Jon Otsemobor	(England) Norwich City	Free	
22 January 2010	FW	(England) Lee Barnard	(England) Southend United	Undisclosed	
30 January 2010	MF	(England) Jason Puncheon	(England) Plymouth Argyle	Undisclosed	
Players transferred out
Date	Pos.	Name	Club	Fee	Ref.
2 June 2009	MF	(England) Nathan Dyer	(Wales) Swansea City	£400,000	
29 June 2009	FW	(England) David McGoldrick	(England) Nottingham Forest	£1 million	
1 July 2009	MF	(England) Andrew Surman	(England) Wolverhampton Wanderers	£1.2 million	
21 July 2009	FW	(Jamaica) Jason Euell	(England) Blackpool	Free	
27 August 2009	FW	(Poland) Grzegorz Rasiak	(England) Reading	Undisclosed	
22 January 2010	FW	(Scotland) Matt Paterson	(England) Southend United	Exchange	
27 January 2010	FW	(Poland) Marek Saganowski	(Greece) Atromitos	Free	
Free agents signed
Date	Pos.	Name	Former club	Date released	Ref.
21 July 2009	DF	(England) Dan Harding	(England) Ipswich Town	21 May 2009	
5 August 2009	DF	(Scotland) Graeme Murty	(England) Reading	15 May 2009	
2 September 2009	DF	(Tunisia) Radhi Jaïdi	(England) Birmingham City	15 May 2009	
8 October 2009	FW	(Republic of Ireland) David Connolly	(England) Sunderland	1 June 2009	
Players loaned in
Start date	Pos.	Name	Club	End date	Ref.
14 August 2009	MF	(England) Jacob Mellis	(England) Chelsea	2 January 2010	
20 August 2009	DF	(Scotland) Neal Trotman	(England) Preston North End	2 January 2010	
8 September 2009	FW	(Senegal) Papa Waigo	(Italy) Fiorentina	End of season	
5 October 2009	MF	(England) Michail Antonio	(England) Reading	End of season	
Players loaned out
Start date	Pos.	Name	Club	End date	Ref.
14 August 2009	GK	(England) Tommy Forecast	(England) Grimsby Town	14 September 2009	
1 September 2009	GK	(England) Michael Poke	(England) Torquay United	End of season	
17 September 2009	MF	(England) Oscar Gobern	(England) Milton Keynes Dons	17 October 2009	
28 September 2009	GK	(Poland) Bartosz Białkowski	(England) Barnsley	5 October 2009	
2 October 2009	DF	(England) Ryan Tafazolli	(England) Salisbury City	2 November 2009	
7 October 2009	MF	(England) Anthony Pulis	(England) Lincoln City	7 January 2010	
9 October 2009	FW	(England) Jamie White	(England) Eastleigh	9 December 2009	
12 October 2009	MF	(England) Simon Gillett	(England) Doncaster Rovers	12 December 2009	
24 October 2009	DF	(England) Olly Lancashire	(England) Grimsby Town	24 December 2009	
27 October 2009	MF	(Trinidad and Tobago) Jake Thomson	(England) Torquay United	27 January 2010	
1 February 2010	DF	(England) Olly Lancashire	(England) Grimsby Town	End of season	
3 March 2010	DF	(England) Aaron Martin	(England) Salisbury City	End of season	
25 March 2010	DF	(England) Lee Molyneux	(England) Port Vale	End of season	
Players released
Date	Pos.	Name	Subsequent club	Join date	Ref.
25 June 2009	DF	(Sweden) Michael Svensson	(Sweden) Halmstad	1 August 2011	
30 June 2009	FW	(England) Bradley Wright-Phillips	(England) Plymouth Argyle	15 July 2009	
30 June 2009	FW	(Trinidad and Tobago) Stern John	(England) Crystal Palace	30 July 2009	
