= 2009–10 Norwich City F.C. season =

Norwich City
2009–10 season
- Chairman: Alan Bowkett
- Manager: Bryan Gunn (until 14 August); Paul Lambert (from 19 August)
- Stadium: Carrow Road
- League One: 1st – promoted to The Championship
- FA Cup: Second round
- League Cup: Second round
- Football League Trophy: Area semi-finals
- Top goalscorer: League: Grant Holt (24); All: Grant Holt (30)
- Highest home attendance: 25,506 (vs. Hartlepool United, 30 January)
- Lowest home attendance: 23,041 (vs. Walsall, 5 September)
- Average home league attendance: 24,756
Home colours	Away colours

The 2009–10 season was the 108th season in the history of Norwich City. It was the club's first season in Football League One (third tier of the English football pyramid) for 49 years, following relegation from The Championship in 2008–09. However, they gained promotion back to the second tier as league champions with a club record total of 95 points, finishing nine points ahead of runners-up Leeds United. This article shows statistics and lists all matches played by the club during the season.

== Board and staff members ==
=== Board members ===
Position	Staff
Chairman	(England) Alan Bowkett
Joint Majority Shareholder	(England) Delia Smith
Joint Majority Shareholder	(Wales) Michael Wynn-Jones
Director	(England) Michael Foulger
Director	(England) Stephan Phillips
Chief Executive	(Scotland) David McNally

Last updated: 2 July 2009
Source: Norwich City FC

=== Coaching staff ===
Position	Staff
Manager	(Scotland) Paul Lambert
Assistant manager	(England) Ian Culverhouse
First team coach Reserve team manager	(England) Ian Crook
Head of football operations	(England) Gary Karsa
Goalkeeping coach	(England) Paul Crichton
Head of strength and conditioning	(England) Alan Pearson
Sports Scientist	Vacant
Academy manager	(England) Ricky Martin
Under-14s coach	(England) Neil Adams
Performance analyst	(England) Liam Weeks
Physiotherapist	(England) Simon Spencer
Head of player recruitment	Vacant
Club doctor	(England) Dr Peter Harvey
Chief scout	Vacant

Last updated: 19 August 2009
Source: Norwich City FC

== Players ==
=== First team squad ===
Squad at end of season

Note: Flags indicate national team as defined under FIFA eligibility rules; some limited exceptions apply. Players may hold more than one non-FIFA nationality.

No.	Pos.	Nation	Player
3	DF	ENG	Adam Drury
4	MF	ENG	Matthew Gill
5	DF	ENG	Michael Nelson
6	DF	SCO	Russell Martin
7	MF	WAL	Owain Tudur Jones
8	MF	SCO	Stephen Hughes
9	FW	ENG	Grant Holt (captain)
10	FW	ENG	Jamie Cureton
11	FW	IRL	Stephen Elliott (on loan from Preston North End)
12	DF	IRL	Gary Doherty (vice-captain)
13	GK	ENG	Declan Rudd
14	MF	IRL	Wes Hoolahan
15	MF	IRL	Michael Spillane (Note: Spillane was born in Cambridge, England, but also qualified to represent the Republic of Ireland internationally and represented them at U-17, U-18, U-19 and U-21 level.)
16	FW	SCO	Chris Martin
17	MF	ENG	Tom Adeyemi
18	MF	NIR	Paul McVeigh
19	MF	SCO	Simon Lappin
20	MF	ENG	Darel Russell

No.	Pos.	Nation	Player
21	GK	ENG	Fraser Forster (on loan from Newcastle United)
22	DF	WAL	Rhoys Wiggins (Note: Wiggins was born in Hillingdon, England, but also qualified to represent Wales internationally and represented them at U-17, U-19, and U-21 level.)
23	DF	ENG	Michael Rose (on loan from Stockport County)
24	MF	ENG	Anthony McNamee
25	FW	ENG	Luke Daley
26	DF	WAL	David Stephens (Note: Stephens was born in Welwyn Garden City, England, but also qualified to represent Wales internationally and represented them at U-17, U-19 and U-21 level.)
27	FW	ENG	Cody McDonald
28	DF	ENG	Sam Habergham
29	FW	IRL	Danny Kelly (Note: Kelly was born in Cambridge, England, but also qualified to represent the Republic of Ireland internationally and represented them at U-19 level.)
30	MF	ENG	Korey Smith
31	DF	USA	Zak Whitbread
32	FW	ENG	Oli Johnson
33	DF	DEN	Jens Berthel Askou
34	GK	ENG	Jed Steer
36	MF	ENG	Damon Lathrope
37	DF	ENG	George Francomb
38	MF	WAL	Josh Dawkin (Note: Dawkin was born in St Ives, England, but also qualified to represent Wales internationally through his mother and represented them at U-17 and U-19 level.)

=== Left club during season ===
Note: Flags indicate national team as defined under FIFA eligibility rules; some limited exceptions apply. Players may hold more than one non-FIFA nationality.

No.	Pos.	Nation	Player
1	GK	AUS	Michael Theoklitos (released)
2	DF	ENG	Jon Otsemobor (to Southampton)
6	DF	SRB	Dejan Stefanović (released)
10	FW	ENG	Jamie Cureton (on loan to Shrewsbury Town)
11	MF	ENG	Simon Whaley (to Chesterfield)
22	DF	WAL	Rhoys Wiggins (on loan to Bournemouth)

No.	Pos.	Nation	Player
23	DF	DEN	Dario Đumić (Note: Đumić was born in Sarajevo, SFR Yugoslavia (now Bosnia and Herzegovina), but also qualified to represent Denmark internationally and represented them at every youth level between U-17 and U-20 level before making his international debut for Bosnia and Herzegovina in March 2017.) (to Brøndby)
33	FW	SCO	Kris Renton (on loan to Brechin City)
31	GK	ENG	Ben Alnwick (on loan from Tottenham Hotspur)
32	FW	SRB	Goran Marić (to Real Unión)
36	MF	ENG	Damon Lathrope (on loan to Bishop's Stortford)

== Transfers ==
=== In ===
Date	Squad number	Pos.	Name	From	Fee
16 June 2009	7	MF	Owain Tudur Jones	Swansea City	Undisclosed
1 July 2009	4	MF	Matthew Gill	Exeter City	Free
1 July 2009	5	DF	Michael Nelson	Hartlepool United	Free
8 July 2009	1	GK	Michael Theoklitos	Melbourne Victory FC	Free
22 July 2009	8	MF	Stephen Hughes	Motherwell F.C.	Free
22 July 2009	18	MF	Paul McVeigh	Luton Town	Free
24 July 2009	11	MF	Simon Whaley	Preston North End	Undisclosed
24 July 2009	22	DF	Rhoys Wiggins	Crystal Palace	Undisclosed
24 July 2009	9	FW	Grant Holt	Shrewsbury Town	£500,000
30 July 2009	33	DF	Jens Berthel Askou	Unattached	Free
30 July 2009	32	FW	Goran Marić	Unattached	Free
4 January 2010	6	DF	Russell Martin	Peterborough United	Undisclosed
4 January 2010	24	MF	Anthony McNamee	Swindon Town	Undisclosed
8 January 2010	31	DF	Zak Whitbread	Millwall	Undisclosed
8 January 2010	32	FW	Oli Johnson	Stockport County	Undisclosed

- Total spending: ▼ ~ £650,000

=== Out ===
Date	Squad Num	Pos.	Name	To	Fee
12 May 2009	1	GK	David Marshall	Cardiff City	£500,000
18 May 2009	29	FW	Carl Cort	Brentford	Free
28 May 2009	7	MF	Lee Croft	Derby County	Free
1 July 2009	26	GK	Stuart Nelson	Aberdeen	Free
24 July 2009	8	MF	Sammy Clingan	Coventry City	£650,000
6 August 2009	24	MF	Matty Pattison	Mamelodi Sundowns	Undisclosed
1 September 2009	6	DF	Dejan Stefanović	Released	Free
3 December 2009	32	ST	Goran Maric	Real Unión	Free
8 January 2010	35	FW	Kris Renton	Brechin City	Free
1 February 2010	11	MF	Simon Whaley	Chesterfield F.C.	Free
5 March 2010	1	GK	Michael Theoklitos	Brisbane Roar	Free

- Total income: ▲ ~ £1,150,000

=== Loans in ===
Date	Pos.	Name	From	Expiry
24 July 2009	GK	Ben Alnwick	Tottenham Hotspur	October 2009
28 August 2009	GK	Fraser Forster	Newcastle United	June 2010
25 November 2009	DF	Russell Martin	Peterborough United	4 January 2010
26 November 2009	MF	Anthony McNamee	Swindon Town	4 January 2010
29 January 2010	DF	Michael Rose	Stockport County	June 2010
5 March 2010	FW	Stephen Elliott	Preston North End	June 2010

=== Loans out ===
Date	Pos.	Name	To	Until
1 September 2009	FW	Kris Renton	Brechin City	9 December
18 September 2009	MF	Simon Whaley	Rochdale	18 November 2009
21 November 2009	MF	Simon Whaley	Bradford City	2 January 2010
17 February 2010	FW	Jamie Cureton	Shrewsbury Town	5 May 2010

== Competitions ==
Win Draw Loss

=== Pre-season ===
Note: this section relates to first team friendlies only.

Match	1	2	3	4	5	6	7
Result	7–2	1–0	1–0	3–2	1–1	1–0	3–2

11 July 2009	Dartford	2–7	Norwich City	Dartford, Kent
15:00 BST	Noble 9'; White 68'	Report	Nelson 3'; Neilson 38'; Doherty 43'; C. Martin 55', 66'; Cureton 76', 80'	Stadium: Princes Park; Attendance: 1,910; Referee: Andy D'Urso

14 July 2009	Raith Rovers (Scotland)	0–1	Norwich City	Kirkcaldy, Scotland
19:45 BST		Report	McVeigh 60'	Stadium: Stark's Park; Attendance: 1,135; Referee: Stephen Finnie

16 July 2009	St Johnstone (Scotland)	0–1	Norwich City	St Andrews, Scotland
14:00 BST		Report	Marić 28'	Stadium: University of St Andrews; Attendance: 0 Referee: Kevin Graham

18 July 2009	Airdrie United (Scotland)	2–3	Norwich City	Airdrie, Scotland
15:00 BST	McLaughlin 23' (pen.); Keegan 74'	Report	Hoolahan 13'; Marić 33'; Askou 41'	Stadium: Excelsior Stadium; Attendance: Unknown; Referee: Eddie Smith

25 July 2009	Norwich City	1–1	Manchester United XI	Norwich, Norfolk
15:00 BST	Adeyemi 21'	Report	De Laet 85'	Stadium: Carrow Road; Attendance: 13,381; Referee: Keith Hill

28 July 2009	Crystal Palace	0–1	Norwich City	Selhurst, London
19:45 BST		Report	Whaley 62'	Stadium: Selhurst Park; Attendance: 2,216; Referee: David Phillips

1 August 2009	Norwich City	3–2	Wigan Athletic	Norwich, Norfolk
15:00 BST	C. Martin 36', 57'; Whaley 76'	Report	N'Zogbia 9'; Cho 49'	Stadium: Carrow Road; Attendance: 8,927; Referee: Kevin Wright

=== League ===
Round	1	2	3	4	5	6	7	8	9	10	11	12	13	14	15	16	17	18	19	20	21	22	23
Result	1–7	1–1	1–2	5–2	2–0	0–0	1–2	2–2	1–1	4–0	5–1	1–0	1–2	1–0	3–1	2–0	2–2	4–1	3–0	2–0	3–3	3–0	2–0
Position	23	22	22	19	10	10	14	14	14	9	7	6	6	5	5	5	5	4	3	3	3	3	3

Round	24	25	26	27	28	29	30	31	32	33	34	35	36	37	38	39	40	41	42	43	44	45	46
Result	1–0	3–1	5–0	1–0	2–1	2–1	1–2	2–1	0–2	2–1	1–0	3–0	3–1	1–1	1–0	1–3	2–1	1–1	1–2	1–0	2–0	3–0	0–2
Position	2	2	2	1	1	1	1	1	1	1	1	1	1	1	1	1	1	1	1	1	1	1	1

==== August ====
8 August 2009	Norwich City	1–7	Colchester United	Norwich, Norfolk
15:00 BST	McDonald 72'	Report	Lisbie 10', 38'; Platt 13', 19'; Fox 22'; Perkins 76'; Vernon 90'	Stadium: Carrow Road; Attendance: 25,217; Referee: Rob Shoebridge

15 August 2009	Exeter City	1–1	Norwich City	Exeter, Devon
15:00 BST	Logan 60'	Report	Askou 52'	Stadium: St James Park; Attendance: 6,357; Referee: Anthony Bates

18 August 2009	Brentford	2–1	Norwich City	Brentford, London
19:45 BST	Dickson 51'; Hunt 71'	Report	Tudur Jones 90'	Stadium: Griffin Park; Attendance: 7,395; Referee: Graham Scott

22 August 2009	Norwich City	5–2	Wycombe Wanderers	Norwich, Norfolk
15:00 BST	Holt 16', 71'; Smith 25'; Otsemobor 35'; Askou 49'	Report	Pittman 39'; Harrold 46'	Stadium: Carrow Road; Attendance: 23,428; Referee: Jon Moss

29 August 2009	Hartlepool United	0–2	Norwich City	Hartlepool, County Durham
15:00 BST		Report	Nelson 27'; Hughes 64'	Stadium: Victoria Park; Attendance: 4,470; Referee: Scott Mathieson

Norwich had high expectations after a good pre-season campaign, however a disastrous opening game of the season saw City suffer a record-breaking home defeat, losing 7–1 to Colchester United. Although the Canaries then went on to win 4–0 at Yeovil in the League Cup, Bryan Gunn was sacked and Paul Lambert - the man who had masterminded Colchester's victory against Norwich a few days previously - would be named as his successor, following a 1–1 draw away at Exeter City. Despite losing to Brentford, with the new manager sat in the stands, Lambert's first game in the dug-out saw City beat Wycombe 5–2 at Carrow Road before going on to win their first away league game of the season at Hartlepool (either side of a 1–4 home defeat to Premier League Sunderland in the League Cup), with Canaries fans starting to see signs of a recovery.

==== September ====
5 September 2009	Norwich City	0–0	Walsall	Norwich, Norfolk
15:00 BST		Report		Stadium: Carrow Road; Attendance: 23,041; Referee: Russell Booth

14 September 2009	Milton Keynes Dons	2–1	Norwich City	Milton Keynes, Buckinghamshire
19:45 BST	Puncheon 57'; Leven 77' (pen.)	Report	C. Martin 1'	Stadium: Stadium:mk; Attendance: 10,354; Referee: Roger East

19 September 2009	Norwich City	2–2	Charlton Athletic	Norwich, Norfolk
15:00 BST	Hoolahan 44'; Holt 90'	Report	Burton 18'; Shelvey 40'	Stadium: Carrow Road; Attendance: 24,018; Referee: Steve Tanner

26 September 2009	Gillingham	1–1	Norwich City	Gillingham, Kent
15:00 BST	Jackson 36' (pen.)	Report	Forster (red card) 34'; Russell 90'	Stadium: Priestfield Stadium; Attendance: 7,550; Referee: Paul Taylor

29 September 2009	Norwich City	4–0	Leyton Orient	Norwich, Norfolk
19:45 BST	C. Martin 75'; Holt 78'; Spillane 81'; Cureton 90'	Report	Melligan (red card) 53'	Stadium: Carrow Road; Attendance: 23,981; Referee: Karl Evans

After putting together an encouraging run at the end of August, September proved to be a more frustrating month for City. Starting off with a goalless draw at home to Walsall, Norwich followed that up with a 2–1 away defeat to MK Dons thanks to a dubious penalty awarded to the home side. Second-placed Charlton were next up at Carrow Road, and they quickly took control with an early 2–0 lead before Wes Hoolahan, recalled to the team, scored just before half time and eventually Grant Holt grabbed a last-minute equaliser to salvage a point. The Canaries then travelled to Gillingham the following week, where they found themselves both a goal down and a man down at halftime after goalkeeper Frazer Forster was sent off. But for the second game in succession, City showed fight and determination and once again grabbed a 90th-minute equaliser, this time through Darel Russell. Viewed by some as a turning point, Norwich then eased past Leyton Orient - winning 4–0 at Carrow Road - in the final game of September.

==== October ====
3 October 2009	Norwich City	5–1	Bristol Rovers	Norwich, Norfolk
15:00 BST	C. Martin 9'; Hoolahan 31' (pen.); Holt 33', 40'; Cureton 90'	Report	Hughes 26' (pen.)	Stadium: Carrow Road; Attendance: 24,117; Referee: Andy Hall

10 October 2009	Carlisle United	0–1	Norwich City	Carlisle, Cumbria
15:00 BST		Report	Hoolahan 42'	Stadium: Brunton Park; Attendance: 6,825; Referee: Dave Foster

19 October 2009	Leeds United	2–1	Norwich City	Leeds, West Yorkshire
19:45 BST	Johnson 15'; Beckford 90'	Report	Holt 38'	Stadium: Elland Road; Attendance: 19,912; Referee: Lee Mason

24 October 2009	Norwich City	1–0	Swindon Town	Norwich, Norfolk
15:00 BST	C. Martin 32'	Report		Stadium: Carrow Road; Attendance: 24,959; Referee: Grant Hegley

31 October 2009	Stockport County	1–3	Norwich City	Stockport, Greater Manchester
15:00 GMT	Thompson 82'	Report	Holt 16', 90'; Hoolahan 69' (pen.)	Stadium: Edgeley Park; Attendance: 5,218; Referee: Andy Woolmer

October proved to be the month when Norwich really started climbing up the table. Days after their 4–0 win over Leyton Orient City followed it by a 5–1 win over Bristol Rovers before grabbing a hard-fought 1–0 win away at Carlisle courtesy of a Wes Hoolahan goal. 3 wins on the trot and 10 goals scored meant Norwich were now in a play off place. Next up for Norwich was top of the league Leeds who already looked to be running away with the league. Some would argue City were the better side in this game and City looked to be heading for a point, however Frazer Forster's miskick meant Leeds won the game with virtually the last kick of the game. However City went on to win their next two games of October beating play off chasing Swindon at Carrow Road 1–0 and then a 3–1 away win at Stockport. This meant five wins out of 6 in October and Norwich were only 4 points off second placed Charlton

==== November ====
14 November 2009	Norwich City	2–0	Tranmere Rovers	Norwich, Norfolk
15:00 GMT	Hoolahan 60' (pen.); Doherty 80'	Report		Stadium: Carrow Road; Attendance: 25,025; Referee: Darren Deadman

21 November 2009	Southampton	2–2	Norwich City	Southampton, Hampshire
15:00 GMT	Lallana 11'; Connolly 65'	Report	Hoolahan 54'; Hughes 75'	Stadium: St Mary's Stadium; Attendance: 21,362; Referee: Andy Penn

24 November 2009	Norwich City	4–1	Brighton & Hove Albion	Norwich, Norfolk
19:45 GMT	Holt 3'; Hoolahan 22'; Elphick 69' (o.g.); C. Martin 82'	Report	Tunnicliffe 61'	Stadium: Carrow Road; Attendance: 24,617; Referee: Keith Hill

City only had three league games in November due to cup commitments and they went through the month unbeaten. They grabbed a 2–0 win over struggling Tranmere before drawing 2–2 away at improving Southampton. They followed this up with a 4–1 win over Brighton at home. Grant Holt, Chris Martin and Wes Hoolahan all scored and all three were beginning to rack up the goals for Norwich

==== December ====
1 December 2009	Southend United	0–3	Norwich City	Southend-on-Sea, Essex
19:45 GMT		Report	Holt 68', 90' (pen.); Smith 77'	Stadium: Roots Hall; Attendance: 8,732; Referee: Phil Crossley

5 December 2009	Norwich City	2–0	Oldham Athletic	Norwich, Norfolk
15:00 GMT	Holt 21'; Hoolahan 32'	Report		Stadium: Carrow Road; Attendance: 24,404; Referee: David Phillips

12 December 2009	Yeovil Town	3–3	Norwich City	Yeovil, Somerset
15:00 GMT	Bowditch 21'; MacDonald 67'; Obika 90'	Report	C. Martin 60'; Doherty 65', 90'	Stadium: Huish Park; Attendance: 4,964; Referee: Craig Pawson

19 December 2009	Norwich City	3–0	Huddersfield Town	Norwich, Norfolk
15:00 GMT	Hoolahan 57'; C. Martin 74'; Doherty 79'	Report		Stadium: Carrow Road; Attendance: 25,004; Referee: Chris Sarginson

26 December 2009	Norwich City	2–0	Millwall	Norwich, Norfolk
12:45 GMT	Hoolahan 28'; Holt 68'	Report		Stadium: Carrow Road; Attendance: 25,242; Referee: Graham Salisbury

For the second month in succession, Norwich went unbeaten and by the end of December had begun to really put pressure on the top 2. First up was a 3–0 away win at Southend - a ground the Canaries hadn't won at for 57 years. Following a goalless first half, the visitors turned on the style in the second half with a double from talismanic striker Grant Holt and another from academy-product Korey Smith. This was followed up with a routine 2–0 home win over Oldham, before what proved to be one of City's most exciting games of the season away at Yeovil. The home side took the lead in the first half through ex-Ipswich striker Dean Bowditch, before Norwich came back in the second half with goals from Chris Martin and Gary Doherty giving the Canaries a 2–1 lead. However, Yeovil quickly equalised and then looked to have won it after a 90th-minute goal, before a Russell Martin shot deflected off Gary Doherty in injury-time to ensure a share of the spoils. Two home matches against fellow promotion chasers came next, with Huddersfield Town the first to be dispatched – being defeated 3–0 – before a 2–0 Boxing Day success over Millwall left Norwich just 2 points shy of second-placed Charlton.

==== January ====
2 January 2010	Wycombe Wanderers	0–1	Norwich City	High Wycombe, Buckinghamshire
15:00 GMT		Report	Smith 77'	Stadium: Adams Park; Attendance: 7,171; Referee: Pat Miller

9 January 2010	Norwich City	3–1	Exeter City	Norwich, Norfolk
15:00 GMT	Holt 8', 82'; C. Martin 77'	Report	Stewart 81'	Stadium: Carrow Road; Attendance: 24,955; Referee: Darren Deadman

16 January 2010	Colchester United	0–5	Norwich City	Colchester, Essex
15:00 GMT	Henderson (red card) 90'	Report	C. Martin 16', 45'; Doherty 49'; Johnson 81'; Holt 90'	Stadium: Colchester Community Stadium; Attendance: 10,064; Referee: Mike Dean

23 January 2010	Norwich City	1–0	Brentford	Norwich, Norfolk
15:00 GMT	Holt (red card) 41'; C. Martin 77'	Report		Stadium: Carrow Road; Attendance: 24,979; Referee: Steve Rushton

26 January 2010	Walsall	1–2	Norwich City	Walsall, West Midlands
19:45 GMT	Deeney 35'	Report	C. Martin 77'; McDonald 85'	Stadium: Bescot Stadium; Attendance: 5,022; Referee: Mark Haywood

30 January 2010	Norwich City	2–1	Hartlepool United	Norwich, Norfolk
15:00 GMT	McDonald 27'; Rose 32'	Report	Austin 26'	Stadium: Carrow Road; Attendance: 25,506; Referee: Paul Taylor

January proved to be a pivotal month for Norwich and they started it with a 1–0 win away at struggling Wycombe. Although the Canaries dominated the game they failed to make the breakthrough, and indeed were living dangerously at times with the home side coming close to taking the lead but for the width of the post. But Korey Smith eventually struck the winner in the 79th minute to send Norwich second in the league and into the automatic places for the first time this season. City followed this up with a 3–1 win at home to Exeter, which meant that they went into arguably their biggest game of the season so far - the return fixture against Colchester (with whom there had been considerable bad feeling brewing since Lambert's departure to Carrow Road) - in solid form. After the 7–1 drubbing on the opening day of the season and Paul Lambert's return to Colchester, it had all the makings of a classic. Ultimately though, the match merely served as a way for Norwich to exact fitting revenge, thrashing their hosts 5–0 on an extremely waterlogged pitch. A Chris Martin double put City 2–0 up at half-time before Gary Doherty, Grant Holt and Oli Johnson made it 5–0, with Wes Hoolahan's missed penalty proving not to be costly, whilst Colchester finished the match with 10 men thanks to Ian Henderson's sending off against his former side. On top of handing out a convincing defeat in a local derby, Norwich had now also closed the gap to league-leaders Leeds, and due to the latter's cup commitments, meant that City would usurp Leeds with a win over Brentford in their next match. That task was made more difficult after Grant Holt's sending off in the first half, but they still managed to see out a 1–0 win thanks to a Chris Martin goal. The Canaries now sat above Leeds on goal difference, albeit having played two games more. Another late come-from-behind win at Walsall in their next game, coupled with Leeds slipping to defeat, saw Norwich consolidate their position at the top of the table, extending their lead to three points. City ended the month with a 2–1 win over Hartlepool at Carrow Road, in a match that would see them record their highest attendance of the season, giving them a perfect record of 6 wins from 6 games in January.

==== February ====
6 February 2010	Millwall	2–1	Norwich City	Bermondsey, London
15:00 GMT	Craig 25'; Harris 51'	Report	C. Martin 4'	Stadium: The Den; Attendance: 14,371; Referee: Grant Hegley

13 February 2010	Brighton & Hove Albion	1–2	Norwich City	Brighton, East Sussex
15:00 GMT	Bennett 21'	Report	Holt 80'; Doherty 84'	Stadium: Withdean Stadium; Attendance: 7,258; Referee: Dean Whitestone

20 February 2010	Norwich City	0–2	Southampton	Norwich, Norfolk
15:00 GMT	Russell (red card) 64'	Report	Barnard 33', 77'	Stadium: Carrow Road; Attendance: 25,103; Referee: Russell Booth

23 February 2010	Norwich City	2–1	Southend United	Norwich, Norfolk
19:45 GMT	Johnson 78', 90'	Report	Vernon 45'	Stadium: Carrow Road; Attendance: 24,824; Referee: Mick Russell

27 February 2010	Oldham Athletic	0–1	Norwich City	Oldham, Greater Manchester
15:00 GMT		Report	Holt 53'	Stadium: Boundary Park; Attendance: 5,344; Referee: Rob Shoebridge

City got off to a bad start in February, losing 2–1 away at Millwall despite taking an early lead – their first defeat since October, however, they bounced back with a fortunate 2–1 win away at Brighton. The Canaries were 1–0 down going into the final 10 minutes of the match, before Lambert's gamble of having four strikers on the pitch ultimately paid off as Norwich grabbed two late goals through Holt and Doherty to snatch three vital points. In their next game City again suffered defeat, losing 0–2 to Southampton in what was their first home loss under Paul Lambert, but they had a chance to put it right against their next opponents when struggling Southend came to Carrow Road. Despite their respective league positions, it was Southend who scored first, and indeed were still leading 1–0 with only 11 minutes remaining, before super-sub Oli Johnson came on to score two late goals - the winner arriving in the 94th minute - to clinch the game for Norwich in the most dramatic of circumstances. The final game of the month saw the Canaries see out a 1–0 win away at Oldham, which - coupled with inconsistent results for their promotion rivals across February - was enough to have built-up a 5-point gap on second-placed Leeds and, crucially, a 9-point gap on third-placed Charlton.

==== March ====
6 March 2010	Norwich City	3–0	Yeovil Town	Norwich, Norfolk
15:00 GMT	Hoolahan 2'; Holt 69'; C. Martin 75'	Report		Stadium: Carrow Road; Attendance: 24,868; Referee: James Linington

13 March 2010	Huddersfield Town	1–3	Norwich City	Huddersfield, West Yorkshire
15:00 GMT	Trotman 3'	Report	Holt 69'; Elliott 74', 85'	Stadium: Galpharm Stadium; Attendance: 17,959; Referee: Nigel Miller

20 March 2010	Swindon Town	1–1	Norwich City	Swindon, Wiltshire
15:00 GMT	Greer 90'	Report	Holt 52'	Stadium: County Ground; Attendance: 11,972; Referee: Scott Mathieson

27 March 2010	Norwich City	1–0	Leeds United	Norwich, Norfolk
15:00 GMT	C. Martin 89'	Report	Kandol (red card) 90'	Stadium: Carrow Road; Attendance: 25,445; Referee: Lee Probert

As the season started to reach the business end of proceedings, March was an important month for Norwich with fixtures against 3 promotion chasers, including a home game against second-placed Leeds. City began with an easy 3–0 win over Yeovil at Carrow Road, before a tricky looking match at Huddersfield - who were unbeaten at their Galpharm Stadium going into this game - and had featured a notable home displays. After a disappointing first half, Norwich found themselves 1–0 down going into the break, however, a significant comeback in the second half saw Grant Holt, who had contributed all the goals, grabbing the equaliser before on-loan striker Stephen Elliot bagged a brace to give the Canaries a significant 3–1 win. Next up was a trip to 4th-placed Swindon Town who, despite falling a goal behind to Grant Holt's second-half header, managed to salvage a 92nd-minute equaliser in a 1–1 draw. This set the stage for the visit of out-of-form Leeds to Carrow Road and presented Norwich with the opportunity of moving 11 points clear of their nearest rivals if they could muster a victory. Few scoring chances were presented during the gameplay, but with 89 minutes on the clock, substitute Chris Martin scored a header in the final minutes, leaving them ahead of the chasing pack by considerable distance with just 8 games of the season to go.

==== April ====
2 April 2010	Tranmere Rovers	3–1	Norwich City	Birkenhead, Merseyside
19:45 BST	Thomas-Moore 6' (pen.), 12' (pen.); Curran 31'	Report	Forster (red card) 10'; Holt 58'	Stadium: Prenton Park; Attendance: 6,263; Referee: Eddie Ilderton

5 April 2010	Norwich City	2–1	Stockport County	Norwich, Norfolk
15:00 BST	McNamee 3'; Holt 25'	Report	Ibehre 12'	Stadium: Carrow Road; Attendance: 25,353; Referee: Fred Graham

10 April 2010	Norwich City	1–1	Milton Keynes Dons	Norwich, Norfolk
15:00 BST	C. Martin 90'	Report	Wilbraham 20' (yellow card) 53' (yellow-red card) 90'	Stadium: Carrow Road; Attendance: 24,888; Referee: Kevin Friend

13 April 2010	Leyton Orient	2–1	Norwich City	Leyton, London
19:45 BST	Thornton 3', 29'	Report	Smith 19'	Stadium: Brisbane Road; Attendance: 7,520; Referee: Graham Scott

17 April 2010	Charlton Athletic	0–1	Norwich City	Charlton, London
15:00 BST		Report	Nelson 34'	Stadium: The Valley; Attendance: 20,023; Referee: Andy Hall

24 April 2010	Norwich City	2–0	Gillingham	Norwich, Norfolk
15:00 BST	Russell 74'; Nelson 82'	Report		Stadium: Carrow Road; Attendance: 25,227; Referee: Trevor Kettle

Heading into April and given their advantage at the top of the table, Norwich knew that all that was required was to see the job through to earn promotion. However, the first game of the month proved to be one of the more bizarre games of the season. Away to struggling Tranmere, the home side were awarded two highly dubious penalties in the opening 10 minutes, scoring both, with Fraser Forster also being sent off for Norwich. Tranmere then added a third despite a clear handball, to leave the Canaries furious with the inexplicable performance of referee Eddie Ilderton, before they managed a consolation goal in the second half - but the damage had already been done and the game ended 3–1. Norwich were at least given the perfect opportunity to put things right after that with a home game against bottom team Stockport County following three days later. Whilst the Canaries were far from their best, the game ended in a 2–1 home win that saw Grant Holt become the first Norwich player since 1964 to score 30 goals in a season. MK Dons were the visitors to Carrow Road a few days later in what proved to be a fiery affair. The Dons went 1–0 up in the first half, with City being denied a clear-cut penalty in the second half as the game grew increasingly bad-tempered - the visitors racked up a total of 9 yellow cards (including two for goal-scorer Aaron Wilbraham which saw led to his dismissal) - but once again Chris Martin scored a late goal to rescue a point. With promotion looking as if it could be sealed as early as the next game, City headed to east London to play mid-table Leyton Orient, backed by a bumper away crowd. Unfortunately, it wasn't to be their day as the Canaries were defeated 2–1 by a spirited home side. However, they had a chance to put this right at Charlton. If results went their way, Norwich could be promoted with a win at the ground at which they were relegated 11 months previously. City went ahead through a Michael Nelson header in the first half and, after some terrific saves from Fraser Forster, survived the Charlton onslaught to seal the win and promotion back to the Championship at the first time of asking. Considering their opening day mauling and the 15-point lead that Leeds had once held, it was a monumental achievement for Norwich. It also meant that they only needed 1 point from their remaining three games to seal the title - which was duly delivered in their next game following a 2–0 home win over Gillingham.

==== May ====
1 May 2010	Bristol Rovers	0–3	Norwich City	Bristol
15:00 BST		Report	C. Martin 31'; Johnson 78'; Hughes 68'	Stadium: Memorial Stadium; Attendance: 8,836; Referee: Phil Gibbs

8 May 2010	Norwich City	0–2	Carlisle United	Norwich, Norfolk
15:00 BST		Report	Madine 1'; Price 7'	Stadium: Carrow Road; Attendance: 25,181; Referee: Andy Penn

With promotion and the League One title secured, Norwich City finished the season with a 3–0 away victory against Bristol Rovers and a 0–2 home loss to Carlisle. Norwich City finished the season 9 points ahead of second-placed Leeds and 10 points clear of third-placed Millwall. The team was also the league's highest scorers, with 89 goals scored across the season.

=== FA Cup ===
Round	1	2
Result	7–0	1–3

7 November 2009 Round 1	Paulton Rovers	0–7	Norwich City	Paulton, Somerset
12:45 GMT		Report	Holt 15', 43'; C. Martin 24', 77', 83', 85'; Hoolahan 74'	Stadium: Winterfield Road; Attendance: 2,070; Referee: Andy Hall

28 November 2009 Round 2	Carlisle United	3–1	Norwich City	Carlisle, Cumbria
17:45 GMT	Péricard 12'; Hurst 46'; Keogh 72'	Report	Holt 26'	Stadium: Brunton Park; Attendance: 3,946; Referee: Nigel Miller

Due to being in League One, City started in the FA Cup in the first round. They started off with a potential banana skin away at non-league Paulton Rovers. However City made easy work of Paulton winning 7–0, although City would not make it to the third round of the cup, losing 3–1 away at Carlisle

=== League Cup ===
Round	1	2
Result	4–0	1–4

11 August 2009 Round 1	Yeovil Town	0–4	Norwich City	Yeovil, Somerset
19:45 BST		Report	Hoolahan 55' (pen.); Holt 64', 82', 90'	Stadium: Huish Park; Attendance: 3,860; Referee: James Linington

24 August 2009 Round 2	Norwich City	1–4	Sunderland	Norwich, Norfolk
19:45 BST	Hoolahan 63'; Spillane (red card) 83'	Report	Tainio 26'; Reid 30', 36'; Tudur Jones 67' (o.g.)	Stadium: Carrow Road; Attendance: 12,345; Referee: Anthony Taylor

Norwich once again failed to make any sort of real impact in the Carling Cup, going out in the second round. They managed to pick up a 4–0 away win away at Yeovil with Grant Holt getting a hat-trick in what proved to be Bryan Gunn's final game as manager. Then, in Paul Lambert's second as manager, they lost 4–1 with Lambert putting out a below strength team. Wes Hoolahan grabbed the only goal. The game ended bizarrely with Michael Spillane sent off. Ben Alnwick was forced off injured so City were down to nine men and Cody McDonald was forced to go in goal.

=== Football League Trophy ===
Round	1	2	3	4
Result	1–0	1–0	0–0	2–2

1 September 2009 Round 1	Norwich City	1–0	Brentford	Norwich, Norfolk
19:45 BST	C. Martin 30'	Report		Stadium: Carrow Road; Attendance: 12,540; Referee: Gavin Ward

6 October 2009 Round 2	Gillingham	0–1	Norwich City	Gillingham, Kent
19:30 BST		Report	McDonald 66'	Stadium: Priestfield Stadium; Attendance: 2,814; Referee: Steve Cook

10 November 2009 Area quarter-final	Swindon Town	0–0 (3–5 p)	Norwich City	Swindon, Wiltshire
19:30 GMT		Report		Stadium: County Ground; Attendance: 4,978; Referee: Graham Horwood
	Penalties
	Paynter (penalty scored); Austin (penalty scored); Amankwaah (penalty scored); Easton (penalty missed)		(penalty scored) Tudur Jones; (penalty scored) Hughes; (penalty scored) Nelson; (penalty scored) Askou; (penalty scored) Cureton

15 December 2009 Area semi-final	Southampton	2–2 (6–5 p)	Norwich City	Southampton, Hampshire
19:45 GMT	Papa Waigo 14', 90'	Report	Doherty 33'; C. Martin 55'	Stadium: St Mary's Stadium; Attendance: 15,453; Referee: Kevin Wright
	Penalties
	Lambert (penalty scored); Papa Waigo (penalty scored); James (penalty missed); Lallana (penalty scored); Wotton (penalty scored); Hammond (penalty scored); Antonio (penalty missed); Thomas (penalty scored)		(penalty scored) Holt; (penalty scored) R. Martin; (penalty scored) C. Martin; (penalty missed) Nelson; (penalty scored) Russell; (penalty scored) Otsemobor; (penalty missed) Gill; (penalty missed) McDonald

== League table ==
Pos	Team	Pld	W	D	L	GF	GA	GD	Pts	Promotion, qualification or relegation
1	Norwich City (C, P)	46	29	8	9	89	47	+42	95	Promotion to Football League Championship
2	Leeds United (P)	46	25	11	10	77	44	+33	86	Promotion to Football League Championship
3	Millwall (O, P)	46	24	13	9	76	44	+32	85	Qualification for League One play-offs
4	Charlton Athletic	46	23	15	8	71	48	+23	84	Qualification for League One play-offs
5	Swindon Town	46	22	16	8	73	57	+16	82	Qualification for League One play-offs

Source: The Football League
Rules for classification: 1) points; 2) goal difference; 3) number of goals scored.
(C) Champions; (O) Play-off winners; (P) Promoted

== See also ==
- 2009–10 in English football
