= Jon Otsemobor =

English footballer (born 1983)

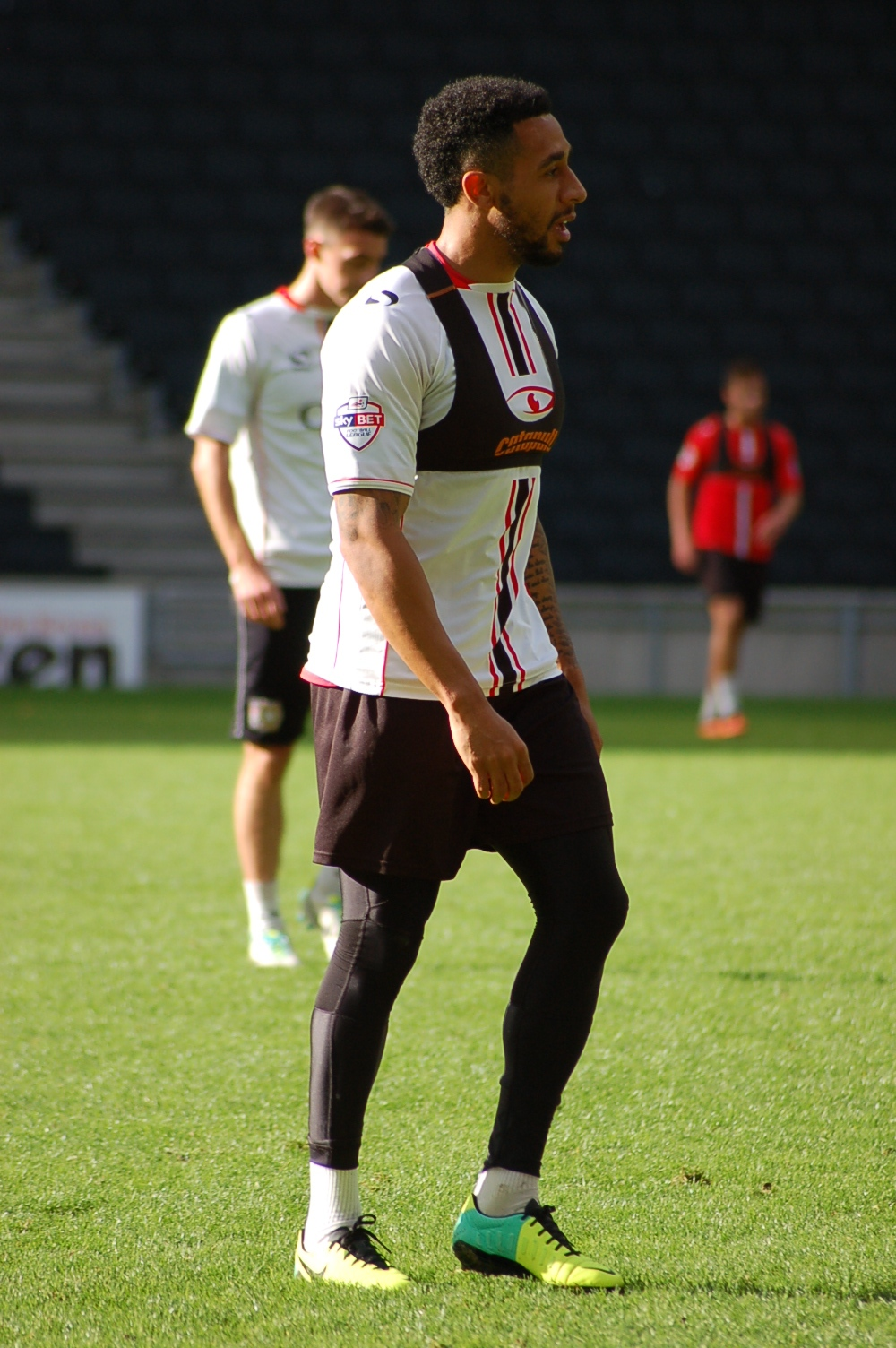
- Otsemobor warming up for Milton Keynes Dons in 2013

Personal information
- Full name: Jon Otsemobor
- Date of birth: 23 March 1983 (age 43)
- Place of birth: Liverpool, England
- Height: 5 ft 10 in (1.78 m)
- Position: Right back

Youth career
- –2002: Liverpool

Senior career*
Years	Team	Apps	(Gls)
2002–2005	Liverpool	4	(0)
2003	→ Hull City (loan)	9	(3)
2004	→ Bolton Wanderers (loan)	1	(0)
2004–2005	→ Crewe Alexandra (loan)	14	(1)
2005–2006	Rotherham United	10	(0)
2006–2007	Crewe Alexandra	43	(0)
2007–2010	Norwich City	93	(2)
2010	Southampton	19	(0)
2010–2012	Sheffield Wednesday	26	(0)
2012–2014	Milton Keynes Dons	44	(1)
2013–2014	→ Tranmere Rovers (loan)	2	(0)
Total		265	(7)
- * Club domestic league appearances and goals

Jon Otsemobor (born 23 March 1983) is an English former professional footballer who played as a right back.

Born in Liverpool, he began his career with hometown club Liverpool. He also played for Hull City, Bolton Wanderers, Crewe Alexandra, Rotherham United, Norwich City, Southampton, Sheffield Wednesday, Milton Keynes Dons and Tranmere Rovers.

He made headlines at the age of 20 when as an innocent bystander he was shot in the buttocks by an armed gang-member gunman in a Liverpool nightclub. As a footballer, he gained cult-hero status at the MK Dons for his "Heel of God" goal and upon leaving the club he described it as "one of the only clubs I've thoroughly enjoyed being at".

== Career ==
=== Liverpool ===
Born in Liverpool, Merseyside, Otsemobor progressed through Liverpool's youth system and signed a professional contract with the club on 23 March 2000. After impressing in the reserve side, he made his debut in Liverpool's 3–1 win over Southampton in the League Cup.

He was loaned out to Hull City for the rest of the season to gain some first team experience. Otsemobor scored his first career goal for Hull in their 4–2 defeat to Rushden & Diamonds. Otsemobor also scored a further two goals in Hull's 2–0 win over Shrewsbury Town and the 2–1 defeat at Wrexham. Following his loan spell at Hull City came to an end, Otsemobor signed a new contract with Liverpool, keeping him until 2005.

In the 2003–04 season, Otsemobor played five more games for Liverpool, making appearances in the 1–1 draw with Newcastle United and the 3–1 win over Bolton Wanderers. He also appeared in the newspapers in October 2003, when he was shot in the buttocks during a gun incident in a bar. He was then loaned out again, this time to Bolton Wanderers where he only played one game, which was their 3–1 defeat to Manchester City. However, before the end of the season, Otsemobor's loan spell with Bolton Wanderers came to an end, though he wasn't allowed to play for Liverpool throughout the 2003–04 season.

Otsemobor was then loaned out to Crewe Alexandra on a month loan. Six days later after signing for them, He made his debut for Crewe in the 3–0 win over Watford. He scored one goal during his loan at Crewe, which was in the 2–2 draw with Leicester City. Ostsemobor's loan spell with Crewe extended on a season long deal. This came after he turned down a contract with Liverpool, which was due to expire at the end of the 2004–05 season. Otsemobor said he was keen to stay at the club on a permanent basis; ironically, he said his loan spells would help him earn a first team at Liverpool. By the end of December, Otsemobor's loan spell with Crewe ended, with fourteen appearances and scoring once.

Otsemobor was released by the club at the end of the 2004–05 season.

=== Rotherham United ===
Despite interests from Crewe and Hearts, Otsemobor signed for Rotherham United on 5 July 2005, on a free transfer from Liverpool.

After appearing on the first four as an unused substitute, Otsemobor finally made his debut for Rotherham United, coming on as a substitute for Lee Williamson in the 71st minute, in a 4–0 win over Blackpool on 27 August 2005. At Rotherham United, Otsemobor made eight appearances and scored one goal for the club against Port Vale in the League Cup before being sold again, this time on a free transfer back to Crewe Alexandra.

=== Crewe Alexandra ===
Otsemobor signed permanently for Crewe on 19 January 2006, keeping him until at the end of the 2006–07 season. He made his second debut for the club in a 2–1 defeat to Plymouth Argyle. Otsemobor, along with Steve Foster, Madjid Bougherra and Billy Jones were considered the main reason for Crewe's late attempt for safety in the final few months of the 2005–06 season, which eventually failed. Otsemobor also appeared in all of the games during Crewe's five game undefeated run.

During pre-season, in June 2006, Otsemobor failed to return to training on an agreed date. From 9 to 14 June 2006, club manager Dario Gradi failed to make contact with Otsemobor and reasons for his absence were unknown. On 14 June 2006, Otsemobor returned to Crewe citing a long holiday and misunderstanding as the reason he missed training. After apologising for his actions, Manager Dario Gradi accepted Otsemobor's apology.

In the 2006–07 season, Ostemobor continued to be in the first team and played a vital role during a match against Cheltenham Town on 12 September 2006 when he provided a double assist, in a 3–1 win for Crewe. However, Ostemobor's playing time was reduced after suffering injuries, which saw make twenty-seven appearances in his first full season. Despite this, Ostemobor was named in the PFA League One Team of the Year for 2006–07, along with teammate Luke Varney.

With his contract expiring at the end of the 2006–07 season, Ostemobor was linked with a move to Norwich City and Preston North End. In December 2006, Ostemobor turned down a contract, which prompted criticism from Crewe supporters.

=== Norwich City ===
After leaving Crewe Alexandra, Otsemobor joined Norwich City on a three-year contract with the club in June 2007.

Otsemobor made his Norwich City debut in the opening game of the season, where he played 90 minutes as a right-back, in a 0–0 draw against Preston North End. His first goal for the club came in a 5–1 win against Colchester United on 22 March 2008. Otsemobor ended his first season at Norwich City, making forty-three appearances and scoring once.

However, his second season at Norwich City was not successful as the first one, as he was competing over the right-back spot with on-loan signing Elliott Omozusi. Ostemobor made his first appearance for the club in the 2008–09 season on 30 August 2008, in a 1–1 draw against Birmingham City. After the match, Manager Glenn Roeder praised Otsemobor's performance on his return. Soon, Otsemobor suffered ankle injury during a 2–1 loss against Derby County in mid-October. Otsemobor regained his right-back spot in the first team from November, after Omozusi left the club. Despite making thirty-eight appearances for the club, Norwich City, however, was relegated to League One.

In the 2009–10 season, Otsemobor's performance was criticised when the defense conceded seven goals, in a 7–1 loss against Colchester United in the opening game of the season. Weeks after the defeat, Otsemobor scored his first Norwich City goal of the 2009–10 season, in a 5–2 win over Wycombe Wanderers on 22 August 2009, in Paul Lambert's first win as Norwich City Manager. However, Otsemobor suffered injuries, which saw his playing time reduced and eventually being on the substitutes bench at the end of December. Despite this, Otsemobor made his 100th Norwich City appearance, in a 2–2 draw against Southampton on 21 November 2009.

=== Southampton ===
Otsemobor signed for Southampton on 14 January 2010, on a free transfer from League One promotion rivals Norwich City.

He made his debut on 16 January playing alongside two other recent signings, José Fonte and Danny Seaborne, in a 1–1 draw at Millwall. However, Otsemobor suffered an injury that kept him out throughout March, which was sustained during a 1–0 win over Leeds United. He was unable to contribute to Southampton winning the 2009–10 Football League Trophy as he was cup-tied.

Despite being keen to stay at Southampton, Otsemobor was among twelve players to be released by the club in May 2010.

=== Sheffield Wednesday ===
On 8 June 2010, it was announced that Otsemobor would be joining Sheffield Wednesday with effect from 1 July. Otsemobor was linked with a move to League One clubs before joining Sheffield Wednesday.

Otsemobor made his Sheffield Wednesday debut in the first round of League Cup, in a 1–0 win over Bury on 8 August 2010. However, Otsemobor did not make a perfect start at Sheffield Wednesday as he was on the substitutes' bench for the first seven matches. It took until 25 September 2010 before Otsemobor made his league debut, coming on as a substitute for Darren Purse in the 45th minute, in a 1–0 loss against former club Southampton. However, on 16 October against Yeovil Town, Otsemobor was sent-off in the 86th minute for a foul on Nathan Smith, just two minutes before winning the penalty, allowing Tommy Miller to convert the penalty successfully. The game ended with Sheffield Wednesday winning 2–0. Following this, Otsemobor made an appearance in a FA Cup match before suffering a calf injury. Despite making an appearance against Huddersfield Town on 3 January 2011, Otsemobor was once again sidelined with a calf injury. After making his return in late-March, Otsemobor retained his first team place for the remainder of the 2010–11 season, as he made fifteen appearances in his first season.

In the 2011–12 season, Otsemobor appeared in the first four matches before suffering an injury. Otsemobor made his first team return from injury on 31 December 2011, where he set up a goal for Ben Marshall in the 42nd minute, in a 2–0 win over Preston, followed up setting up another goal in the next goal for Chris Lines, in a 2–1 win over Tranmere Rovers. Otsemobor suffered an injury that kept him out for the 2011–12 season. Otsemobor ended his second season at Sheffield Wednesday, with eleven appearances.

After coming runners-up in the 2011–12 Football League One with Sheffield Wednesday he was released amongst six other players having played twenty-six times for the club in the league since he joined in 2010.

=== Milton Keynes Dons ===
On 5 July 2012, Otsemobor signed for League One side Milton Keynes Dons on a one-year deal, becoming the Dons first signing of the summer.

Otsemobor made his Milton Keynes Dons debut, playing as a right-back, in a 1–1 draw against AFC Bournemouth on 21 August 2012 and seven days later, he provided assist for Milton Keynes Dons's first goal, in a 2–1 win over Blackburn Rovers in the second round of League Cup. Otsemobor continued to be in the first team and then scored his first Milton Keynes Dons goal, in a 5–1 win over Colchester United on 24 November 2012. A week later on 2 December 2012, he scored the winning goal in the third minute of injury time as the Dons defeated AFC Wimbledon 2–1 in the Second Round of the FA Cup. This has given Otsemobor cult-hero status from Dons fans, dubbing the right-back "The Heel of God". Two years later, Otsemobor was later awarded Goal of the Decade title at the club's award ceremony. However, Otsemobor suffered a groin injury that kept him out for throughout December. After making his return to the first team, Otsemobor went on to make thirty-five appearances in his first season at Milton Keynes Dons.

In the 2013–14 season, however, Otsemobor dropped to third choice right back, as a result of focusing on development of youth at Milton Keynes Dons.

He returned to his native Merseyside on 28 November 2013, when he agreed to join Tranmere Rovers on a month's loan. He became the third player to join Rovers on that day on loan with Blackburn Rovers defender Ryan Edwards and Liverpool winger Kristoffer Peterson. Otsemobor made his Tranmere Rovers debut two days later after signing for the club, in a 2–1 win over Colchester United. After making two appearances for the club, Ostemobor returned to his parent club after suffering injury, prompting the club not extending his loan spell at Tranmere Rovers.

After his Tranmere Rovers loan spell ended, Otsemobor subsequently left MK Dons by mutual consent on 8 January 2014.

=== End of career ===
At the end of June 2014, he trialled with Doncaster Rovers and played for them against Bradford Park Avenue in a pre-season friendly on 9 July 2014.

== Personal life ==
He made headlines at the age of 20 when as an innocent bystander he was shot in the buttocks by an armed gang-member gunman in a Liverpool nightclub.

After he retired from football he became involved in property management and development.

== Career statistics ==
Appearances and goals by club, season and competition
Club	Season	League			FA Cup		League Cup		Other^{[A]}		Total	
Club	Season	Division	Apps	Goals	Apps	Goals	Apps	Goals	Apps	Goals	Apps	Goals
Liverpool	2002–03	Premier League	0	0	0	0	1	0	0	0	1	0
Liverpool	2003–04	Premier League	4	0	0	0	1	0	0	0	5	0
Liverpool	2004–05	Premier League	0	0	0	0	0	0	0	0	0	0
Liverpool	Total		4	0	0	0	2	0	0	0	6	0
Hull City (loan)	2002–03	Division Three	9	3	0	0	0	0	0	0	9	3
Bolton Wanderers (loan)	2003–04	Premier League	1	0	0	0	0	0	0	0	1	0
Crewe Alexandra (loan)	2004–05	Championship	14	1	0	0	1	0	0	0	15	1
Rotherham United	2005–06	League One	10	0	0	0	2	1	2	0	14	1
Crewe Alexandra	2005–06	Championship	16	0	0	0	0	0	0	0	16	0
Crewe Alexandra	2006–07	League One	27	0	1	0	3	0	3	0	34	0
Crewe Alexandra	Total		43	0	1	0	3	0	3	0	50	0
Norwich City	2007–08	Championship	43	1	1	0	3	0	0	0	47	1
Norwich City	2008–09	Championship	37	0	2	0	1	0	0	0	40	0
Norwich City	2009–10	League One	13	1	1	0	1	0	2	0	17	1
Norwich City	Total		93	2	4	0	5	0	2	0	104	2
Southampton	2009–10	League One	19	0	0	0	0	0	0	0	19	0
Sheffield Wednesday	2010–11	League One	15	0	1	0	2	0	3	0	21	0
Sheffield Wednesday	2011–12	League One	11	0	3	0	2	0	0	0	16	0
Sheffield Wednesday	Total		26	0	4	0	4	0	3	0	37	0
Milton Keynes Dons	2012–13	League One	35	1	5	1	1	0	0	0	41	2
Milton Keynes Dons	2013–14	League One	9	0	0	0	2	0	1	0	12	0
Milton Keynes Dons	Total		44	1	5	1	3	0	1	0	53	2
Tranmere Rovers	2013–14	League One	2	0	0	0	0	0	0	0	2	0
Career totals			265	7	14	1	20	1	11	0	310	9

A. The "Other" column constitutes appearances and goals (including those as a substitute) in the Football League Trophy.

== Honours ==
Individual

- PFA Team of the Year: 2006–07 Football League One
