= Nicola Cortese =

Italian banker

- Born: Nicola Cortese; 7 August 1968 (age 57); Italy
- Occupation: Banker
- Known for: Executive chairman of Southampton

Nicola Cortese (born 7 August 1968) is a Swiss-based Italian banker, best known for his time as executive chairman of Southampton Football Club. He joined the club in August 2009 as a director of Southampton Football Club Limited before departing in January 2014. Katharina Liebherr succeeded him as executive chairman of the club.

== Banking career ==
Cortese was educated in Switzerland and England in business communication and finance. He was involved for ten years in sports business practice as head of the sports and entertainment desk at various Swiss banks, providing global services to sports and entertainment professionals. He is currently a proposed buyer of Sunderland AFC. His most recent position was as an executive at Banque Heritage in Geneva, where he managed the finances of billionaires. He had previously run the sports business desk for Credit Suisse.

== Southampton Football Club ==
=== Appointment as executive chairman ===
In July 2009, Cortese conducted the deal to buy Southampton, then in administration, for Markus Liebherr, a German-born, Swiss-based industrialist. Following the completion of the purchase, Liebherr realised that his newly acquired business had no senior management structure, and invited Cortese to take the role of executive chairman, with the principal role of developing the long-term strategy for the football club and the business. Cortese was appointed a director of Southampton Football Club Limited on 1 August 2009.

At the time of the appointment, Liebherr commented:

Nicola has been pivotal in conceiving the purchase of the Club and making it happen. I am now delighted to entrust him with overseeing the Club's progress, development and achievement of success over the long term. Nicola and I have enjoyed a long business relationship and it was Nicola who convinced me about buying the Club. He then conducted what proved to be a very difficult process very expertly and professionally. Ultimately, it happened because Nicola was at all times focused on strong business and ethical principles. Since our early conversations about the deal I made it clear that I would only buy the Club if he remained involved following the purchase. I am therefore very happy that he has accepted the role as Executive Chairman.

On accepting the appointment, Cortese said:

I have been running the Club as Markus' representative since 8 July and a good start has been made in recruiting well regarded senior staff and our new First Team Manager, who have begun putting together the strategies for on and off field success. But it is only a start. We have been reviewing, and will continue to review, every aspect of the Club. We will be applying policies to our football team, commercial operations, financial structures, community work and fan communications which ensure that we run as a first-in-class football club and business.

I realise that there are great expectations and I will ensure that every effort is expended to meet these expectations, but effectively we need to restructure and create a solid base from which we can build and become successful. This will take time. We will take our example from our supporters, who already are what we aim to become – Premier League. With their support we will again become a Premier League Club. The supporters, the City of Southampton and the region deserve nothing less. Everyone at the Club will be fully committed to responding to this great challenge.

=== Links with Italian football clubs ===
In January 2010, rumours were circulated that a top Italian club had approached Southampton about Cortese with a view to him joining their board of directors. Initially the mystery club was believed to be Fiorentina, because at the time that Southampton signed Senegalese striker Papa Waigo on loan in September 2009, Cortese is alleged to have commented that he had "links on the board".

It was subsequently claimed that the club concerned was A.C. Milan, but Cortese pledged his future to Southampton, saying: "Southampton is my baby; I'm not going to abandon it". In a statement on the club's website, Cortese claimed that he had been approached but that he remained totally committed to Southampton:

I am obviously flattered about the interest, and flattered that it has come from a top, top team because I think this is a success, not just for me, but for Southampton Football Club, the supporters, my management team and our First Team. It shows that what is happening here is attracting awareness, that is good for both our supporters and our partners, and also good for attracting new partners. It shows that we are not just creating awareness locally, but nationally, and also as it seems internationally. My answer at the time when I had this approach was a simple one and I didn't have to think for even a second about it. The club, despite where they are and the success that they have had in the past in the Italian leagues cannot offer me anything that Southampton cannot achieve.

=== Comments to the Press ===
In February, Cortese was interviewed on Radio Solent when he appeared to put pressure on the Southampton manager, Alan Pardew, when he was reported to say that, despite the form in the EFL Trophy, he was not satisfied with the team's results in League One, with the club's "top priority" being to reach the end of season play-offs.

If you go back to the beginning of the season, Southampton were probably not in a much different position than Norwich or Charlton, with the difference that we started on minus ten points; but Norwich or Charlton had no money to spend in the window. We all know what we spent. Now we are approximately 30 points behind Norwich and 20 points behind Charlton. I think that gap is simply too big.

The following month, Cortese denied that there was any rift between him and Pardew, but once again underlined his desire to reach the play-offs at the end of the season. Cortese said they were both of the opinion that the amount spent in January – around £2 million – meant the playoffs had to become their target for the campaign.

We spent quite a considerable amount of money in the transfer window. Simply, when you do that automatically your expectations change. When the manager comes to ask me about buying players, we also talk about what we are going to end up with when we are buying those players. So we were always on the same page with what we want to achieve.

A few weeks later, on 28 March 2010, Cortese was present at Wembley to witness Southampton win the EFL Trophy, defeating Carlisle United 4–1. After collecting his winner's medal, Pardew embraced both Liebherr and Cortese. Pardew later commented:

There's been a lot of speculation about what the acting chief executive has said and some of the pressure he's put on us and I have to accept that. It was important we won this so I can look him in the eye and say "we've won this".

=== Departure ===
Following media speculation over an "irreconcilable rift" with the club's owner, Katharina Liebherr, Cortese resigned from his position at the club on 15 January 2014. Liebherr, who appointed herself as the Non-Executive Chairman of the club following Cortese's resignation, expressed her regret over the departure, commenting that Cortese had done a "wonderful job" in his tenure as chairman, and "we wanted him to stay".

== Business style ==
In an interview with The Times in March 2010, Cortese discussed his approach to running a football club.

Clubs spend money they do not have; they spend next year’s income. They spend money that will not arrive for two years and say, "But we'll have some success and bring in more cash to cover the shortfall". It cannot be sustained. In good times you need to be saving money for the bad times. If we reach the Premier League, I would like to be in a position where we did not need parachute payments. In good years you should put money away for the bad years.

== Family ==
At the time of his appointment, Cortese was living in Ennetbaden, Switzerland with his wife Alexandra and two children. He has since moved his family to Hampshire.
