= Danny Seaborne =

English footballer (born 1987)

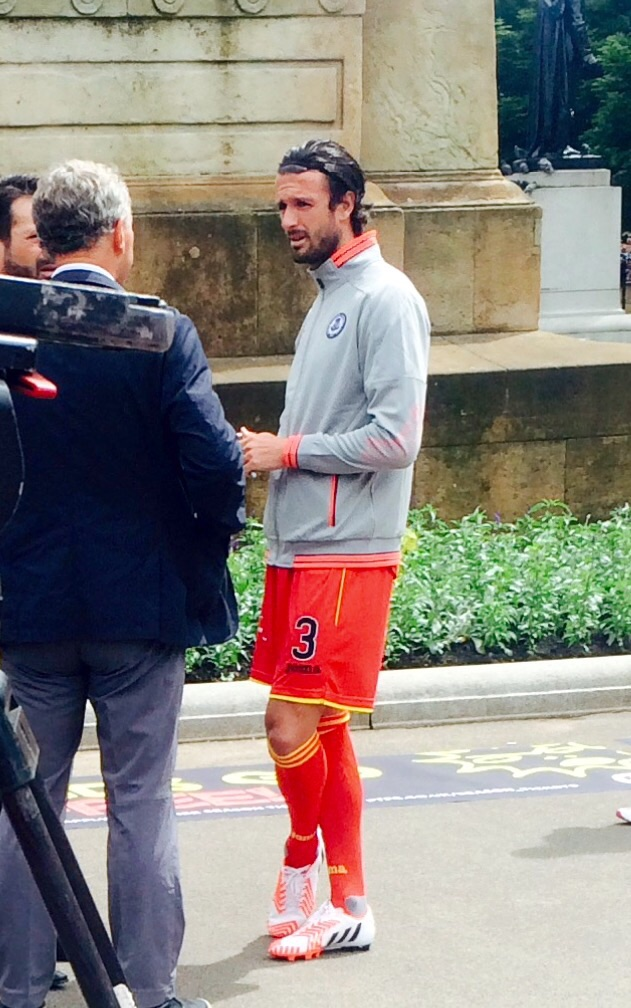
- Seaborne in 2015

Personal information
- Full name: Daniel Anthony Seaborne
- Date of birth: 5 March 1987 (age 39)
- Place of birth: Barnstaple, England
- Height: 6 ft 0 in (1.83 m)
- Position: Centre back

Youth career
- –2005: Exeter City

Senior career*
Years	Team	Apps	(Gls)
2005–2010	Exeter City	86	(5)
2004–2005	→ Clyst Rovers (loan)		
2005	→ Tiverton Town (loan)		
2006	→ Taunton Town (loan)		
2006–2007	→ Dorchester Town (loan)		
2010–2013	Southampton	44	(0)
2012–2013	→ Charlton Athletic (loan)	7	(0)
2013	→ Bournemouth (loan)	13	(0)
2013–2014	Yeovil Town	10	(0)
2013–2014	→ Coventry City (loan)	5	(0)
2014	Coventry City	16	(1)
2014–2016	Partick Thistle	50	(1)
2016–2017	Hamilton Academical	11	(0)
2017–2018	Exeter City	5	(0)
2018	Derry City	8	(0)
Total		255	(7)
- * Club domestic league appearances and goals as of 18:47, 30 December 2018 (UTC)

Daniel Anthony Seaborne (born 5 March 1987) is an English former professional footballer who played as a defender.

Seaborne began his professional career at Exeter City, having risen through the club's youth system; he signed his professional contract in May 2005. Seaborne had numerous loan spells during his time at Exeter, including moves to Clyst Rovers, Tiverton Town and Dorchester Town. In January 2010, Seaborne signed a 3 1/2-year contract with Southampton. Having made 44 appearances for the club, Seaborne was released by the Premier League side in June 2013. Following his release, Seaborne spent time at clubs including Bournemouth, Yeovil Town and Coventry City. In August 2014, Seaborne signed for Scottish Premiership side Partick Thistle on a two-year contract. He joined Hamilton Academicals in 2016 but was released the following year. After six months without a club, he rejoined Exeter City in December 2017.

== Career ==
=== Exeter City ===
Seaborne was born in Barnstaple, Devon. A defender who plays at centre half or left back, he began his football career as a trainee with Exeter City, and signed his first professional contract in May 2005. He spent several spells on loan, to Clyst Rovers in the 2004–05 season, Tiverton Town in September 2005, and Taunton Town in January 2006, before making his Conference debut in the 3–1 home win over Dagenham & Redbridge in April 2006. Also in the same month Seaborne scored his first career goal, a header from a corner, in the 4–0 home win against Crawley Town. He was rewarded with a new one-year contract, but, unable to get a regular place in the team, was loaned out again, this time to Conference South side Dorchester Town. In June 2007 he signed a new one-year deal, but a broken leg sustained as the result of a bad tackle in a pre-season friendly against South West Peninsula League side Bodmin Town kept him out for three months. Once restored to the team, he formed a successful defensive partnership with Matt Taylor, was handed the captaincy, and led them to promotion via the play-off final, in which they beat Cambridge United 1–0. Seaborne signed a new two-year contract before the 2008–09 season, and was a regular in the side as Exeter were again promoted, this time to Football League One.

=== Southampton ===
On 13 January 2010, Seaborne signed for Southampton for an undisclosed fee on a 3 1/2-year contract. He made his debut on 16 January playing alongside two other recent signings, José Fonte and Jon Otsemobor, in a 1–1 draw at Millwall. He was unable to contribute to Southampton winning the 2009–10 Football League Trophy as he was cup-tied. Seaborne, alongside seven other professional players was released by Southampton in June 2013.

==== Loans ====
On 9 November 2012, Seaborne joined Charlton on a one-month loan deal. On 17 January 2013, he joined AFC Bournemouth on loan for the remainder of the season.

=== Yeovil Town ===
On 19 July 2013, he signed for newly promoted Championship side Yeovil Town on a two-year contract, following his release from Southampton. Seaborne made his Yeovil debut, on 3 August 2013, in their 1–0 Championship victory over Millwall.

On 28 November 2013, Seaborne joined Football League One side Coventry City on loan until 5 January 2014.

=== Coventry City ===
On 14 January 2014, Seaborne joined Coventry City permanently after a successful loan spell. He scored his first goal for Coventry in a 1–0 win against Stevenage on 26 March 2014. However, he left on 8 August 2014, after his contract was terminated by mutual consent.

=== Partick Thistle ===
On 11 August 2014, Seaborne signed for Scottish Premiership club Partick Thistle, agreeing a two-year contract. He scored his first goal for Thistle in a 1–1 draw against Kilmarnock at Firhill in December 2014. Seaborne scored his second Partick Thistle goal in a 2–1 win against St Mirren in the Scottish Cup.

When his contract expired in May 2016, Seaborne was one of several players who quit the club.

=== Mohun Bagan ===
On 4 August 2016, it was reported that Seaborne had joined Kolkata-based Mohun Bagan of the I-League. However, only a few days later, after one training session, it was reported that Seaborne had left Mohun Bagan to attend a trial with Super League Greece side, Olympiacos. He had never officially signed a contract with Mohun Bagan or Olympiacos.

=== Hamilton Academical ===
On 24 August 2016, Seaborne returned to Scotland to sign for Hamilton Academical. He was released at the end of the season.

=== Return to Exeter City ===
On 1 December 2017, it was announced by Exeter City that Seaborne had rejoined the club.

He was released by Exeter at the end of the 2017–18 season.

=== Derry City ===
Seaborne joined League of Ireland Premier Division club Derry City in July 2018, signing a contract until the end of the 2018 season.

== Post-playing career ==
Seaborne joined Lincoln City in November 2025 as chief operations officer, before being promoted to the club's new chief operating officer in August 2026.

== Career statistics ==
As of 18 February 2017

Club	Season	League			FA Cup		League Cup		Other^{[A]}		Total	
Club	Season	Division	Apps	Goals	Apps	Goals	Apps	Goals	Apps	Goals	Apps	Goals
Exeter City	2005–06	Conference	4	1	0	0	0	0	0	0	4	1
Exeter City	2006–07	Conference	4	1	0	0	0	0	0	0	4	1
Exeter City	2007–08	Conference	26	2	1	0	0	0	2	0	29	2
Exeter City	2008–09	League Two	33	1	1	0	1	0	1	0	36	1
Exeter City	2009–10	League One	19	0	2	0	1	0	1	0	23	0
Exeter City	Total		86	5	4	0	2	0	4	0	96	5
Southampton	2009–10	League One	16	0	0	0	0	0	0	0	16	0
Southampton	2010–11	League One	24	0	3	0	1	0	0	0	28	0
Southampton	2011–12	Championship	4	0	0	0	2	0	0	0	6	0
Southampton	2012–13	Premier League	0	0	0	0	3	0	0	0	3	0
Southampton	Total		44	0	3	0	6	0	0	0	53	0
Charlton Athletic (loan)	2012–13	Championship	7	0	0	0	0	0	0	0	7	0
AFC Bournemouth (loan)	2012–13	League One	13	0	0	0	0	0	0	0	13	0
Yeovil Town	2013–14	Championship	10	0	0	0	1	0	0	0	11	0
Coventry City (loan)	2013–14	League One	5	0	2	0	0	0	0	0	7	0
Coventry City	2013–14	League One	16	1	1	0	0	0	0	0	17	1
Partick Thistle	2014–15	Scottish Premiership	18	1	2	0	2	0	0	0	22	1
Partick Thistle	2015–16	Scottish Premiership	32	0	2	1	1	0	0	0	35	1
Partick Thistle	Total		50	1	4	1	3	0	0	0	57	2
Hamilton Academical	2016–17	Scottish Premiership	11	0	2	0	0	0	0	0	13	0
Career total			242	7	16	1	12	0	4	0	274	8

A. The "Other" column constitutes appearances (including substitutes) and goals in the Football League Trophy, FA Trophy, 2008 Conference Premier play-off final.

== Personal life ==
On 1 September 2011, Seaborne was the victim of a serious assault outside a nightclub in Southampton. He received treatment at Southampton General Hospital.
