= Russell Martin (footballer) =

Football player and manager (born 1986)

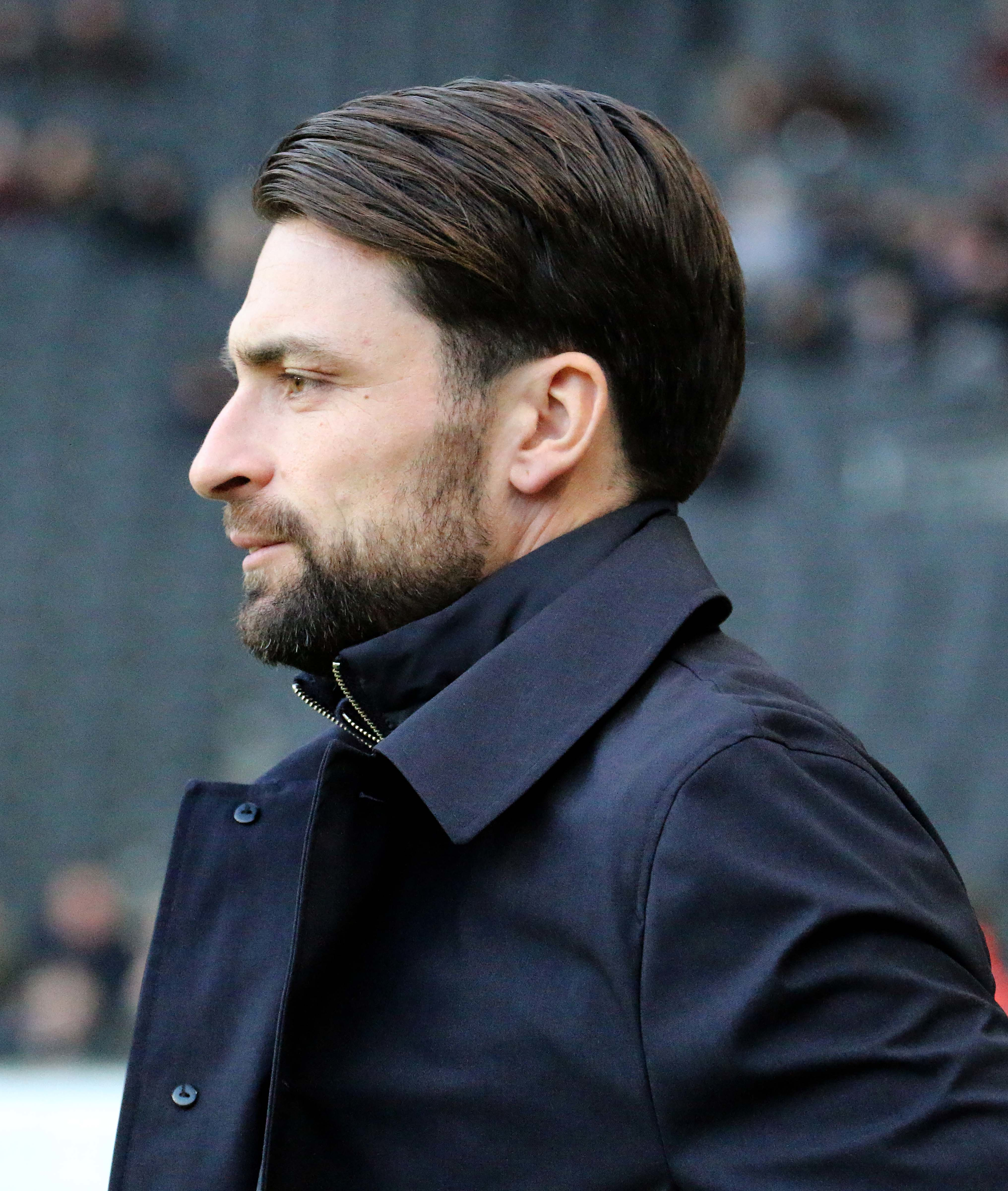
- Martin in 2019

Personal information
- Full name: Russell Kenneth Alexander Martin
- Date of birth: 4 January 1986 (age 40)
- Place of birth: Brighton, England
- Height: 6 ft 0 in (1.83 m)
- Position: Defender

Team information
- Current team: Leicester City (manager)

Youth career
- 2003–2004: Brighton & Hove Albion

Senior career*
Years	Team	Apps	(Gls)
2004	Lewes		
2004–2008	Wycombe Wanderers	116	(5)
2008–2010	Peterborough United	56	(1)
2009–2010	→ Norwich City (loan)	6	(0)
2010–2018	Norwich City	278	(16)
2018	→ Rangers (loan)	15	(1)
2018–2019	Walsall	8	(0)
2019	Milton Keynes Dons	29	(2)
Total		508	(25)

International career
2011–2017	Scotland	29	(0)

Managerial career
- 2019–2021: Milton Keynes Dons
- 2021–2023: Swansea City
- 2023–2024: Southampton
- 2025: Rangers
- 2026–: Leicester City
- * Club domestic league appearances and goals

Russell Kenneth Alexander Martin (born 4 January 1986) is a professional football manager and former player who is currently the manager of EFL League One club Leicester City. Born in England, he represented Scotland at international level.

A former defender, Martin began his playing career at Brighton & Hove Albion's youth academy. He established himself at Wycombe Wanderers in 2004, before moving to Peterborough United in 2008. Martin joined Norwich City in 2010 and made 309 appearances for the club. He then had brief spells with Rangers, Walsall and Milton Keynes Dons. During his playing career, Martin won five promotions (including two promotions to the Premier League) and was named in the 2014–15 Championship Team of the Year by the Professional Footballers' Association.

Martin moved into management in 2019 with Milton Keynes Dons and became head coach of Swansea City in 2021. Two years later, he was appointed manager of Southampton, whom he guided to Premier League promotion before being dismissed the following season. In June 2025, he was appointed head coach of Rangers, but was dismissed four months later. Martin was appointed manager of Leicester City in June 2026.

== Personal life ==
Martin was born in Brighton, East Sussex, to parents Dean and Kerry. He has two older brothers, Jamie and David, and a younger brother Pepe, whom his parents also fostered. His father was a taxi driver who subjected Martin's mother to domestic abuse and spent periods in prison. His father's gambling addiction saw the family lose their house in Hollingbury, moving to Hollingdean. His father coached his son's football teams. Martin was educated at Varndean School then Varndean College, achieving A-Levels in history, PE and drama. Prior to signing with Wycombe he was cleaning pub toilets in the mornings before school, then working in a Spar in the evenings.

Martin established a charitable foundation in his hometown of Brighton, initially set up as a football academy, named the Russell Martin Foundation. The charity aims to use "the power of football to help change people's lives" by providing access to football, education, and health courses in the local community.

Martin has been a vegan since 2014, initially for health reasons as he sought to manage issues with ulcerative colitis. He was also a part-owner of Erpingham House, a vegan restaurant in the UK. In a 2018 interview, he stated that he had joined the Green Party of England and Wales. He is also a proponent of Buddhism.

On 31 July 2024, Martin was awarded an honorary degree from the University of Brighton for his charitable work with the Russell Martin Foundation.

In February 2026, it was announced that he had married former glamour model Lucy Pinder.

== Club career ==
=== Early career ===
Martin joined Brighton & Hove Albion's youth academy before leaving by mutual consent in early 2004 to join Isthmian League Division One South team Lewes. He then had trials with several clubs, including Charlton Athletic.

Martin joined Wycombe Wanderers in 2004. He made his debut in a 2–1 home victory over Cambridge United on 7 August 2004, then went on to make ten more appearances during the 2004–05 season. Ahead of the 2006–07 season, Martin signed a new two-year contract with the club. In the following season, he played in the League Two play-off semi-final against Stockport County, which Wycombe lost 2–1 on aggregate.

On 29 May 2008, Martin moved to Peterborough United, who had just been promoted to League One. He signed a three-year contract. Martin became the club's youngest ever captain after taking over from Craig Morgan. In his first season at Peterborough, Martin captained the club to gain promotion to the Championship.

=== Norwich City ===
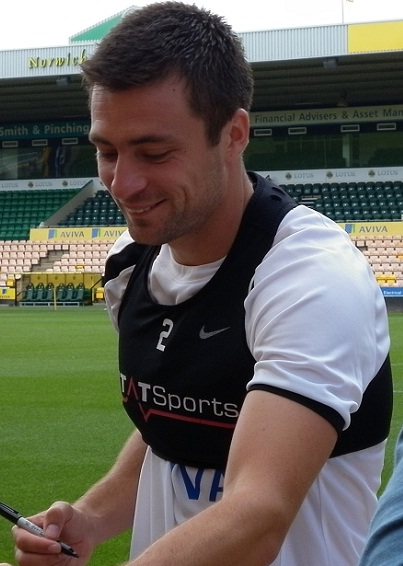
Martin as a player at Norwich City in 2012.

Following Mark Cooper's appointment as a replacement for Darren Ferguson in November 2009, Martin joined Norwich City on loan. On 4 January 2010, his transfer was made permanent and he joined Norwich on a 2 1/2-year contract. Martin scored his first goal for Norwich in the 3–1 defeat to Doncaster Rovers, with a diving header on 14 September 2010. He scored the only goal in a 1–0 victory over Championship league leaders Queens Park Rangers on 1 January 2011, and a last-minute equaliser against Cardiff City, leading fans to dub him "the Cafu of the Championship" or "the Norfolk Cafu", in honour of Cafu. On 7 May 2011, he was the runner up for the Norwich City Player of the Year award to winner Grant Holt, in a season where he played every minute of each game.

After an impressive first season in the Premier League with Norwich, filling in well at centre back during some games, Martin signed a new three-year deal in June 2012. On 29 December 2012, Martin scored two goals against Manchester City in a 4–3 home defeat. On 9 July 2013, Martin agreed a new three-year deal with the club. On 10 August 2013, he was officially named the club captain. In a 2013 interview, Martin revealed his desire to take up management after the end of his playing career, stating, "I would eventually love to come and manage Norwich."

On 22 November 2014, Martin made his 200th appearance for Norwich against his hometown club Brighton & Hove Albion. He scored Norwich's second goal in a 3–3 draw. Norwich were promoted to the Premier League in the 2014–15 season via the playoffs, a year after their relegation, but were relegated again after just one season back in the top division. Martin made his 300th appearance for Norwich on 21 April 2017, in a 2–0 win against Brighton & Hove Albion. He signed a new contract with Norwich in July 2017, but then had few first team appearances during the 2017–18 season.

==== Rangers (loan) ====
In January 2018, Martin moved on loan to Scottish Premiership club Rangers. He made his competitive debut for the club on 24 January, in a 2–0 win against Aberdeen. Martin was one of four players to make their first appearance for Rangers in that game. He scored his first (and only) goal for Rangers in a 2–0 win against Hearts on 24 February 2018.

Following his loan with Rangers, Martin left Norwich City on 31 August 2018 after his contract was terminated by mutual consent. He made 309 appearances for Norwich, placing him 22nd in the club's all-time appearance list.

=== Final years and retirement ===
Martin signed for League One club Walsall in October 2018 in a player-coach role. He left by mutual consent in January 2019, for family reasons, having made twelve appearances for the club.

On 15 January 2019, Martin joined League Two club Milton Keynes Dons on a short-term deal until the end of the season, and played a key role in the club clinching promotion on the final day of the season. Following the departure of manager Paul Tisdale on 2 November 2019, Martin was appointed as his successor in his first managerial position the following day and later announced his retirement as a player to concentrate on the role.

== International career ==
Martin, who was born in England, qualified to play for Scotland through his Scottish father. On 17 May 2011, he was named in the Scotland squad for Nations Cup games against Wales and the Republic of Ireland, making his debut as a late substitute against Wales. He remarked before a game against Croatia in June 2013 that he was not recognised by taxi drivers when he met up with the Scotland squad. Martin made his first competitive appearance for Scotland in that match against Croatia, which Scotland won 1–0 with then Norwich City teammate Robert Snodgrass scoring the only goal. He went on to play regularly under the management of Gordon Strachan, making 29 international appearances in total. His last cap came in a 1–0 win against Slovenia in March 2017.

== Managerial career ==
=== Milton Keynes Dons ===
On 3 November 2019, following the departure of manager Paul Tisdale, Martin was announced as the new permanent first-team manager of League One club Milton Keynes Dons – the club he had joined as a player earlier in the year. Following his appointment, the club finished 19th in League One, with the season finishing prematurely due to the COVID-19 pandemic.

Martin, alongside assistant Luke Williams, installed a possession-based style of play at the club which received widespread plaudits. On 2 March 2021, Martin's team scored after a 56-pass move, a new British record at the time. At the culmination of the 2020–21 season, only Manchester City and Barcelona had a higher average possession percentage in Europe than Martin's MK Dons. His team also had the most touches in the opposition box in League One, despite mixed results throughout the season which saw the club finishing 13th in the league.

On 31 July 2021, MK Dons confirmed that Championship club Swansea City had requested to speak to Martin about him becoming their new manager, leaving the club with no manager two days prior to the season opener.

=== Swansea City ===
On 1 August 2021, Martin was named head coach of Swansea City, signing a three-year contract. He was appointed six days before the first game of the 2021–22 Championship season. He was joined by his assistants Luke Williams, Matthew Gill, and Dean Thornton.

Martin's first game in charge was a 2–1 away loss to Blackburn Rovers, which was followed by a 3–0 away win against Reading in the EFL Cup. Martin's first home game was a 0–0 draw with Sheffield United at the Swansea.com Stadium. On 20 August, Martin won his first league game as Swansea beat Bristol City 1–0. In October, Martin led Swansea to a 3–0 win against rivals Cardiff City in the South Wales derby. Later in the season, Swansea beat Cardiff 4–0 in the reverse fixture; Swansea became the first team to complete the league double in the derby's 110-year history. Martin said, "I have not felt as emotional as this after a game... to watch the backroom staff and the players enjoy that with the supporters was the best moment I've had as a manager I'd say."

In his first season at the club, Swansea finished 15th in the league. The following season, he led the club to 10th place.

=== Southampton ===
On 21 June 2023, Martin was named manager of Southampton and signed a three-year contract. His first professional game in charge was a 2–1 victory against Sheffield Wednesday, ending Southampton's nine-match winless run in their last nine opening day fixtures. In that game, Southampton made 477 successful first-half passes, a divisional record. From September 2023 to February 2024, Martin led Southampton to a club-record 25-game unbeaten run. Martin led Southampton to play-off victory on 26 May 2024, beating Leeds United 1–0, securing promotion to the Premier League at the first time of asking.

On 2 July 2024, Martin signed a three-year contract extension. He secured his first Premier League victory on 2 November 2024 in a 1–0 victory against Everton. On 15 December 2024, Martin was dismissed after a 5–0 home defeat against Tottenham Hotspur. He left the club with one league win in sixteen matches, leaving Southampton bottom of the league.

=== Rangers ===
Martin was appointed head coach of Scottish Premiership club Rangers in June 2025 on a three-year deal. He initially received criticism after stating that he would not follow the club tradition of the manager wearing a suit pitchside. Four months later, on 5 October 2025, Martin was dismissed following a 1–1 draw away to Falkirk with the club eighth in the league table. With a tenure spanning 123 days, Martin is the shortest-serving manager in Rangers' history.

=== Leicester City ===
On 15 June 2026, Leicester City announced Martin as the club's new first-team manager. Martin signed a contract running until 2029. Martin had a poor start at Leicester, only winning three games from his first eight matches in charge.

== Managerial style ==
"I played in teams who were dominant with the ball and loved it. I also played in teams who didn't have much of the ball and hated it. My style is probably shaped by that and the teams I've enjoyed watching play football like Barcelona, Manchester City and Spain. I've tried to replicate that at the level I'm at and with the players I've had. If I didn't do that, I probably wouldn't have gone into coaching or management."

— Martin on his style of play, 2021.

Martin began studying for his coaching badges at age 22, and studied for his UEFA Pro Licence at the Scottish FA in 2019. His managerial style has been influenced by such managers as Chris Hughton, Daniel Farke, and Pep Guardiola. Inspired by Guardiola's Barcelona and Manchester City teams, Martin prefers his teams to dominate ball possession. Tactically, he prefers the 3–4–2–1, 3–5–2, 4–1–2–1–2, or 4–3–3 formations, with an emphasis on passing the ball and pressing the opposition. If his teams suffer a bad result, Martin prefers to improve his game plan, rather than changing the style of play.

After his MK Dons team scored a record-breaking 56-pass goal, Martin said, "People still react to that and say it's boring, but everyone has a different opinion... the more we have the ball, the more we can control the game and take the fight out of opposition teams. It's a 90-minute game plan to try and dominate the ball."

== Career statistics ==
=== Club ===
Appearances and goals by club, season and competition
Club	Season	League			National cup (Note: Includes FA Cup, Scottish Cup)		League cup (Note: Includes Football League Cup/EFL Cup)		Other		Total	
Club	Season	Division	Apps	Goals	Apps	Goals	Apps	Goals	Apps	Goals	Apps	Goals
Wycombe Wanderers	2004–05	League Two	7	0	1	0	0	0	3 (Note: Appearance(s) in Football League Trophy)	0	11	0
Wycombe Wanderers	2005–06	League Two	23	3	1	0	0	0	5 (Note: Three appearances in Football League Trophy, two in League Two play-offs)	0	29	3
Wycombe Wanderers	2006–07	League Two	42	2	2	0	7	0	2	0	53	2
Wycombe Wanderers	2007–08	League Two	44	0	1	0	1	0	3 (Note: One appearance in Football League Trophy, two in League Two play-offs)	0	49	0
Wycombe Wanderers	Total		116	5	5	0	8	0	13	0	142	5
Peterborough United	2008–09	League One	46	1	4	0	1	0	1	0	52	1
Peterborough United	2009–10	Championship	10	0	—		4	0	—		14	0
Peterborough United	Total		56	1	4	0	5	0	1	0	66	1
Norwich City	2009–10	League One	26	0	0	0	—		1	0	27	0
Norwich City	2010–11	Championship	46	5	1	0	2	0	—		49	5
Norwich City	2011–12	Premier League	33	2	3	0	1	0	—		37	2
Norwich City	2012–13	Premier League	31	3	2	0	1	0	—		34	3
Norwich City	2013–14	Premier League	31	0	2	0	2	0	—		35	0
Norwich City	2014–15	Championship	45	2	0	0	1	0	3 (Note: Appearances in Championship play-offs)	0	49	2
Norwich City	2015–16	Premier League	30	3	1	0	0	0	—		31	3
Norwich City	2016–17	Championship	37	1	2	0	1	1	—		40	2
Norwich City	2017–18	Championship	5	0	0	0	2	0	0	0	7	0
Norwich City	2018–19	Championship	0	0	—		0	0	—		0	0
Norwich City	Total		284	16	11	0	9	1	4	0	308	17
Rangers (loan)	2017–18	Scottish Premiership	15	1	2	0	0	0	0	0	17	1
Walsall	2018–19	League One	8	0	3	0	0	0	1	0	12	0
Milton Keynes Dons	2018–19	League Two	18	1	—		—		—		18	1
Milton Keynes Dons	2019–20	League One	11	1	0	0	3	0	1	0	15	1
Milton Keynes Dons	Total		29	2	0	0	3	0	2	0	34	2
Career total			508	25	25	0	25	1	21	0	579	26

=== International ===
Appearances and goals by national team and year
National team	Year	Apps	Goals
Scotland	2011	1	0
Scotland	2012	3	0
Scotland	2013	6	0
Scotland	2014	6	0
Scotland	2015	6	0
Scotland	2016	6	0
Scotland	2017	1	0
Total		29	0

=== Managerial record ===
As of match played 21 November 2026

Managerial record by team and tenure
Team	From	To	Record								Ref
Team	From	To	G	W	D	L	GF	GA	GD	Win %	Ref
Milton Keynes Dons	3 November 2019	31 July 2021	80	30	19	31	107	105	+2	37.50	
Swansea City	1 August 2021	21 June 2023	99	36	27	36	139	143	−4	36.36	
Southampton	21 June 2023	15 December 2024	73	33	14	26	120	113	+7	45.21	
Rangers	5 June 2025	5 October 2025	17	5	6	6	21	24	−3	29.41	
Leicester City	15 June 2026	present	20	10	4	6	38	28	+10	50.00	
Total			289	114	70	105	425	413	+12	39.45	

== Honours ==
=== Player ===
Peterborough United

- Football League One runner-up: 2008–09

Norwich City

- Football League One: 2009–10
- Football League Championship runner-up: 2010–11
- Football League Championship play-offs: 2015

Milton Keynes Dons

- EFL League Two third-place promotion: 2018–19

Individual

- PFA Team of the Year: 2014–15 Championship

=== Manager ===
Southampton

- EFL Championship play-offs: 2024

== See also ==
- List of Scotland international footballers born outside Scotland
