= Alan Bowkett =

British businessman

Alan John Bowkett (born 6 January 1951 in London) is a British businessman, and former chairman of British company Redrow. He was chairman of Norwich City football club from 2009 until he resigned in 2015. Bowkett is also a non-executive chairman of IDH, Europe's largest dental care provider.

He was previously chief executive of Boulton & Paul Ltd.

On appointment to his role at Norwich City, he said:

Our task at Norwich City is a simple one – we must start winning football matches. It will be the board's responsibility to ensure that we have the appropriate resources to do that, both human and financial.

== Career ==
Alan Bowkett has been a businessman in England for more than 35 years. In 1987, Bowkett undertook his first private equity deal and bought RHP, the ball-bearing company, for £72.5 million.

Between January 2010 and April 2017, Bowkett was the chairman of Avio SpA, an Italy-based leader in space propulsion. Since 2008, he has been a chairman of Strix Ltd., a British electronic controls company with manufacturing in China.
