= Neal Trotman =

English footballer

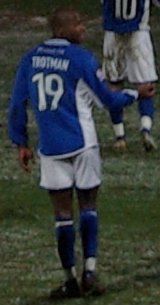
- Trotman in 2007

Personal information
- Full name: Neal Anthony Trotman
- Date of birth: 11 March 1987 (age 39)
- Place of birth: Levenshulme, Manchester, England
- Height: 6 ft 2 in (1.88 m)
- Position: Defender

Youth career
- 2004–2005: Burnley

Senior career*
Years	Team	Apps	(Gls)
2006–2008	Oldham Athletic	18	(1)
2007	→ Halifax Town (loan)	11	(2)
2008–2011	Preston North End	3	(0)
2009	→ Colchester United (loan)	6	(0)
2009–2010	→ Southampton (loan)	18	(2)
2010	→ Huddersfield Town (loan)	21	(2)
2010–2011	→ Oldham Athletic (loan)	18	(0)
2011–2012	Rochdale	12	(0)
2011–2012	→ Chesterfield (loan)	7	(0)
2012–2013	Chesterfield	47	(1)
2013–2014	Plymouth Argyle	41	(2)
2014–2015	Bristol Rovers	19	(1)
Total		221	(11)
- * Club domestic league appearances and goals

Neal Anthony Trotman (born 11 March 1987) is an English former professional footballer who played as a central defender.

== Football career ==
=== Oldham Athletic ===
Born in Levenshulme, Manchester, England, Trotman started his football career at grassroots club Fletcher Moss Rangers. He then joined Burnley and progressed through the club's youth system. He captained the club's youth side to reach the Alliance Cup final but lost. However, the following year, he was released by Burnley at the age of 18 and was soon picked up by Oldham Athletic.

After spending two months on the substitute bench in the first team, Trotman made his professional debut (and Oldham), coming on as a substitute for Stefan Stam in the second half, in a 2–1 win over Cheltenham Town on 4 November 2006. In his second appearance for the side, he scored his first goal for the club in an FA Cup tie against Kettering Town, in a 4–3 win. With his chances limited, he was sent out on loan to Halifax Town for the remainder of the 2006–07 season. By the time he joined Halifax Town on loan, Trotman made two appearances for the side and signed a new deal, keeping him until the end of the season.

Trotman made his Halifax Town debut on 23 January 2007 against York City, starting the whole game, in a 1–1 draw. He then scored three goals in three matches between 17 February 2007 and 24 February 2007, scoring against Stafford Rangers, Weymouth and Kidderminster Harriers. Trotman became a first team regular for Halifax Town until he suffered a hamstring injury that kept him out for six weeks. On 7 April 2007 he made his return from injury, starting the whole game, in a 1–0 win over Cambridge United. At the end of the 2006–07 season, Trotman made twelve appearances and scoring two times for the side.

Trotman's chances at the beginning of the 2007–08 season were also limited until injuries hit the Latics' defence. Trotman then found himself in a string of first team matches, impressing the manager and the fans in the process. He was quickly hailed a "hot prospect" by the fans and became a first team regular for the side. Trotman then scored his first goal of the season, coming against Doncaster Rovers in the first round of the FA Cup, which saw both drew 2–2. However, in the first round of the FA Cup replay, he was sent–off for a second bookable offence, which saw Oldham Athletic win 2–1. Trotman then scored his second goal of the season against Leeds United in Oldham's 3–1 win at Elland Road; however, he missed their historic 1–0 win over Everton at Goodison Park due to suspension after accumulating five yellow cards. His good aerial ability matched by his athleticism, strength and sharpness attracted scouts from clubs in higher divisions. With interest growing in Trotman, Oldham faced a tough fight to keep hold of him during the transfer window. On 29 January, it had been confirmed that Plymouth Argyle had made an undisclosed fee; however that bid alerted numerous clubs who were tracking his progress to make a move, among those clubs were Preston North End, Derby County, and Blackburn Rovers.

=== Preston North End ===
Trotman signed for Preston North End on 30 January 2008 for a fee of £500,000 (including "sell on" and "after appearances" clauses) on a three-year deal.

After spending three months on the sidelines, he made his Preston North End debut, coming on as a substitute for Sean St Ledger midway through the first half, who suffered an injury, in a 2–2 draw against Plymouth Argyle on 19 April 2008. At the end of the 2007–08 season, Trotman made three appearances for the side.

However, in the 2008–09 season, Trotman suffered a hernia injury that kept him sidelined for the rest of the year. By mid–December, he made his return to training and played in the reserve side for several months before being loaned out. For the next two years, Trotman was put on the transfer list by Preston manager Darren Ferguson after returning from a loan spell at League One side Huddersfield Town.

At the end of the 2010–11 season, he was released by the club upon expiry of his contract. Trotman was ranked number five by local newspaper Lancashire Live as "the most bizarre signings in the history of Preston North End".

==== Loan spells from Preston North End ====
In order to get first team football, he signed a one-month loan deal with Colchester United on 19 March 2009 to gain match fitness. Trotman made his Colchester United debut on 21 March 2009, starting the whole game, in a 1–1 draw against Leicester City. During the match, he "dominated both boxes in the air, turning in a man-of-the-match display", resulting from praise by Manager Paul Lambert. Trotman went on to make six appearances for Colchester United.

At the start of the 2009–10 season, he made his first start of the Preston North End coming on as a 67-minute substitute and scoring in their 5–1 win over Morecambe in the first round of the League Cup. On 20 August 2009, Trotman joined Southampton on loan until January 2010, having rejected a move to Millwall. His first start for the club came in their 1–1 draw at home to Brentford on 22 August 2009. Since joining the club, Trotman became a first team regular for the side. His first goal for the club came in a 3–1 victory away at Southend United on 9 October 2009. After being sidelined at the start of December, Trotman then scored in a 3–1 victory over Exeter City on Boxing Day, 2009. Trotman's last appearance for Southampton came in their 2–1 away defeat at Colchester United on 28 December 2009, after making 18 appearances with 17 of them starts and scoring two goals for the club.

In January 2010, he was then loaned out to League One side Huddersfield Town on loan until the end of the season. On 30 January, he made his debut in the 1–0 win against Yeovil Town at Huish Park, along with two other of Towns new signings on loan striker Nathan Eccleston and Australian left back Dean Heffernan. He scored his first goal for the club in the 2–0 win against Hartlepool United at Victoria Park on 20 February 2010. On 13 March 2010, he scored his first goal at the Galpharm Stadium against Norwich City where Town lost 3–1 in the end. Trotman became a regular in the side, replacing vice captain Nathan Clarke partnering captain Peter Clarke in Towns central defence for the second half of the season. After helping the Terriers reach the play-offs, Trotman played in both legs against Millwall, as they lost 2–0 loss to Millwall in the semi-finals. After making 23 appearances and scoring twice for the side, Huddersfield Town manager Lee Clark, confirmed he wants to bring Trotman back to the club on a permanent basis after returning to his parent club, saying: "Neal did well in his time here, playing a key role in our improved away form in the second half of the season and we're looking at his situation."

On 25 November 2010, Trotman re-joined his previous club, Oldham Athletic on loan until January 2011. On 3 January 2011 he made his second debut for Oldham Athletic, setting up the club's only goal of the game, in a 1–0 loss against Rochdale. Shortly after, his loan with the club was then extended until the end of the season. Since joining Oldham Athletic, Trotman became a first team regular for the side. Despite this, Trotman went on to make 18 appearances for Oldham Athletic while on loan.

=== Rochdale ===
Trotman signed for English League One club Rochdale on 14 July 2011 on a two-year contract. Prior to the move, he received "several other offers" before joining Rochdale.

Trotman made his debut for Rochdale in a 2–0 loss against Sheffield Wednesday in the opening game of the season. Trotman received his a red card after a second booking offence against his former Oldham Athletics (the club started his career) as Rochdale lost 2–0. After the match, Manager Steve Eyre criticised Trotman for his "moments of madness" during the match. He was again at fault against Stevenage on 3 September 2011 when he scored an own goal, in a 4–2 loss. Despite this, he continued to regain his first team place for Rochdale until his departure. At the end of the 2011–12 season, making twelve appearances for the club, local newspaper Manchester Evening News described Trotman time at Rochdale as "big disappointments".

=== Chesterfield ===
On 3 November 2011, Trotman joined Chesterfield on a two-month loan deal, with Dean Holden going in the opposite direction. Upon joining the club, he was given a number two shirt for the side.

He made his Chesterfield debut two days later, starting the whole game, in a 2–2 draw against Yeovil Town. The deal became permanent on 3 January 2012, having become a first team regular up until this moment. He was made captain of the side by manager John Sheridan for the rest of the season. On 10 March 2012 Trotman scored his first goal for the club, in a 2–2 draw against Stevenage. However, he was unavailable to play in the final of the Football League Trophy, having played for Rochdale in the same competition earlier in the season. However, Trotman missed the rest of the 2011–12 season, due to a knee injury, as he made 24 appearances and scoring once for the side.

Ahead of the 2012–13 season, Trotman returned from injury in the club's pre–season. At the start of the season, he continued to retain his first team status under the management of Sheridan. After Sheridan sacking, Paul Cook appointed as a new manager and under his management, Trotman's first team was limited, resulting in him placed on the transfer list, along with Craig Westcarr. Trotman returned to the first team on 12 January 2013 after the club's injury crisis in defence and made an impressive performance in a 3–0 win over Northampton Town. After the match, Trotman was praised by Cook as "absolutely magnificent" and "manful". Since returning to the first team, he was featured in a number of matches for the side. Later in the 2012–13 season, Trotman formed a defensive partner with Liam Cooper. At the end of the 2012–13 season, having made 34 appearances, Trotman was among seven players to be released by Chesterfield following his expiry of the contract.

=== Plymouth Argyle ===
After being released by Chesterfield, Trotman went on trial with Scottish Premiership side Partick Thistle. He was offered a contract by them, but a deal was not agreed and he then had a short trial at Dundee United. He played in a friendly against Wigan Athletic, but was not offered terms. Trotman signed a short-term contract with Plymouth Argyle in August. The move, initially until January 2014, reunited him with Sheridan, who previously signed him at Oldham and Chesterfield.

He made his debut in a League Cup game at Birmingham City the next day, playing 120 minutes, as Plymouth Argyle lost 3–2. Since joining the club, Trotman became a first team regular for the side, playing in the centre–back position. On 25 October 2013 he scored his first goal for the club in a league match at Mansfield Town, which saw Plymouth Argyle won 1–0. His handful of first team football resulted in Trotman signing a contract extension with the club until the end of the season. In a match against York City on 15 February 2014, he was sent–off in early first half, as Plymouth Argyle lost 4–0. After serving a one match suspension, Trotman then scored his second goal for the club, in a 2–1 loss against Bristol Rovers on 8 March 2014. At the end of the 2013–14 season, making forty–eight appearances and scoring two times for the side, Trotman was released by Plymouth Argyle upon expiry of his contract.

=== Bristol Rovers ===
On 7 August 2014, Neal agreed to a short-term deal to join Bristol Rovers in the Conference Premier following his release from Plymouth Argyle.

He made his Bristol Rovers debut against Barnet on 12 August 2014, starting a match before coming off at half time, as they lost 2–0. Trotman soon became a first team regular for the side at the start of the season. However, at the beginning of November, he suffered ankle injury that kept him out for a month. On 2 December 2014 Trotman returned to the first team from injury, coming on as a first half substitute in a 0–0 draw against Wrexham. He then scored his first goal for the club, in a 2–1 win over Torquay United on 26 December 2014. However, he was soon found himself away from the club, as he was placed on the substitute bench, and later sidelined with a knee injury for the rest of the season. Despite this, his involvement with Bristol Rovers this season saw the club went on to miss out on the Conference Premier league title on the final day by 1 point but earned promotion via the playoffs, triumphing on penalties against Grimsby Town, securing a return to the football league at the first time of asking.

After making 19 appearances and scoring once as the club won promotion, Trotman was released at the end of the 2014–15 season and subsequently retired from football aged 28 due to injury problems.

== After football ==
After injury curtailed his career prematurely, Trotman decided to utilise his negative experiences to guide other professional sportsmen with the ups and downs of elite sport.

Alongside a football agency role, Trotman owns a sports psychotherapy consultancy where he helps sportsmen with overcoming issues such as injuries, discrimination and career progression.
