= Stephen Hughes (footballer, born 1982) =

Scottish footballer

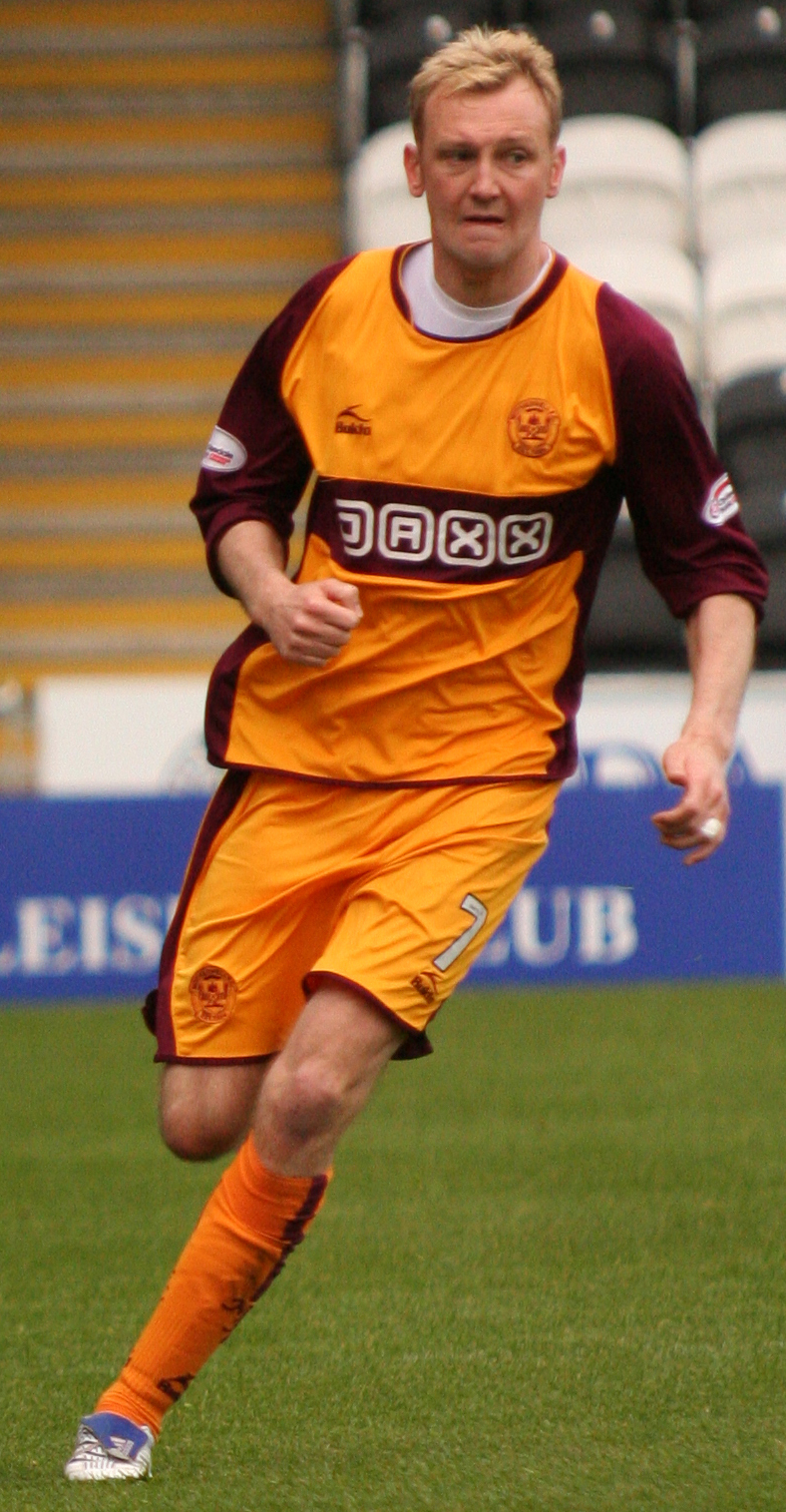
- Hughes playing for Motherwell

Personal information
- Full name: Stephen David Hughes
- Date of birth: 14 November 1982 (age 43)
- Place of birth: Motherwell, Scotland
- Position: Midfielder

Senior career*
Years	Team	Apps	(Gls)
1999–2005	Rangers	64	(7)
2005–2007	Leicester City	91	(7)
2007–2009	Motherwell	66	(2)
2009–2011	Norwich City	30	(3)
2011	→ Milton Keynes Dons (loan)	6	(0)
2011–2012	Motherwell	4	(0)
2012–2013	Aberdeen	28	(0)
2013–2014	East Fife	9	(1)
2014	Dundee	1	(0)
2014	→ East Fife (loan)	10	(1)
Total		309	(21)

International career
2001–2003	Scotland U21	12	(2)
2002–2009	Scotland B	2	(1)
2009	Scotland	1	(0)
- * Club domestic league appearances and goals

Stephen David Hughes (born 14 November 1982) is a Scottish former professional footballer. Hughes played as a midfielder for Rangers, Leicester City, Motherwell, Norwich City, Milton Keynes Dons, Aberdeen, Dundee and East Fife. Hughes made one appearance for Scotland, playing in the last 20 minutes of a friendly match against Japan in 2009.

== Club career ==
=== Rangers ===
Hughes started his career with Scottish Premier League club Rangers at the age of 16. He went on to make 90 appearances for the Ibrox club and scored seven goals in the process.

=== Leicester City ===
Hughes joined Leicester City in January 2005 for £100,000 and signed a three-and-a-half-year deal. In January 2006, he scored a memorable goal which helped knock Tottenham Hotspur out of the FA Cup in a cup upset.

=== Motherwell ===
On 4 June 2007, Hughes was placed on the transfer list by then Leicester manager Martin Allen, with Hearts and Motherwell reportedly offering £50,000 for the player. On 17 August, Hearts had successfully negotiated terms with Hughes. The transfer, however, was delayed, and on 31 August, Hughes joined Motherwell for an undisclosed fee. Hughes played for Motherwell in the 2007–08 and 2008–09 seasons.

=== Norwich City ===
Scottish newspapers on 22 July 2009 suggested that Hughes had joined Norwich City as a free agent on a three-year contract. This was confirmed later the same day. He played his first match for the Canaries in their final pre-season friendly against Wigan on 1 August 2009 playing for 59 minutes before being substituted. He scored his first goal for Norwich in a 2–0 win over Hartlepool on 29 August 2009. Hughes impressed fans with his performances in his first season with the club. However, Hughes sustained an knee injury, which required an operation on 21 October and ruled him out for two months. Hughes returned to Norwich after a loan spell at MK Dons to gain fitness after his operation. He left Norwich by mutual consent in August 2011.

=== Return to Motherwell ===
After leaving Norwich, Hughes became a free agent, but failed to find a club in the first few months. On 16 November 2011, Hughes re-joined Motherwell until 3 January 2012 after a successful trial. Hughes started the match against Hibernian on 2 December 2011, but this match was abandoned at half-time due to a floodlight fire, and was therefore a void match, so his second debut for the club came as a substitute in a 3–0 win away to St Johnstone the following week. Hughes left the club at the end of his deal, after the club decided not to offer him an extension. He made four appearances in his second spell at Fir Park.

=== Aberdeen ===
After a short trial, Hughes signed for Aberdeen on 27 January 2012. He was released from his contract on 7 June 2013.

=== East Fife ===
On 10 October 2013, Hughes signed for Scottish League One side East Fife. Hughes made 9 league appearances for East Fife, scoring one goal.

=== Dundee ===
Having completed a short-term contract with East Fife, Hughes signed for Scottish Championship club Dundee in January 2014. His Dundee career was short lived where he played only the first 45 minutes away to Falkirk where after a poor performance was substituted at half time. He never again played for Dundee.

=== East Fife (loan) ===
After making one appearance for Dundee, Hughes rejoined East Fife on loan after being told he was not part of the new manager Paul Hartley's plans.

== International career ==
Hughes's debut call-up to the Scotland national team was to play Japan in October 2009. Hughes appeared as a second-half substitute, replacing Charlie Adam in the 67th minute.

== Honours ==
Rangers

- Scottish Premier League: 2002–03, 2004–05
- Scottish League Cup: 2001–02

Norwich City

- Football League One: 2009–10
