= Papa Waigo =

Senegalese footballer

Personal information
- Full name: Papa Waigo N'Diaye
- Date of birth: 20 January 1984 (age 42)
- Place of birth: Saint-Louis, Senegal
- Height: 1.85 m (6 ft 1 in)
- Positions: Winger; striker

Senior career*
Years	Team	Apps	(Gls)
2002–2005	Verona	65	(13)
2005–2007	Cesena	71	(20)
2007	Genoa	9	(0)
2008–2011	Fiorentina	8	(2)
2009	→ Lecce (loan)	6	(0)
2009–2010	→ Southampton (loan)	35	(5)
2011	→ Grosseto (loan)	10	(2)
2011–2012	Ascoli	40	(15)
2012–2013	Al-Wahda	26	(13)
2013–2014	Al-Ettifaq	26	(9)
2014–2015	Al-Raed		
2015–2016	Ittihad Kalba		
2016–2017	Al Urooba		
2017–2018	Al-Dhaid		
2018 – 2019	Folgore Caratese	8	(0)
2019	Masafi		
Total		304	(79)

International career
2007–2008	Senegal	15	(1)
- * Club domestic league appearances and goals

Papa Waigo N'Diaye (born 20 January 1984), often simplified as Papa Waigo, is a Senegalese former professional footballer who played as a striker.

== Club career ==
=== Early career ===
Born in Saint-Louis, Senegal, Waigo began his career at Verona on 3 June 2002, before heading to Serie B outfit Cesena in 2005. After a successful spell where he was the highest-scoring non-Italian in the 2006–07 season he was signed by Genoa on 9 July 2007 for €5 million (cash plus Salvatore Aurelio valued at €500,000 and Dario Biasi at €100,000), signing a five-year contract.

=== Fiorentina ===
On 19 January 2008, Waigo joined Fiorentina in a swap deal for Belgian defender Anthony Vanden Borre, with the two clubs co-owning both players' rights. Both Vanden Borre and Papa Waigo's 50% registration right was valued €2.1 million.

He made his Serie A debut on 26 August 2007, Genoa 0–3 lost to Milan. He began his Fiorentina career in impressive style, with two goals in his first three games, including one in the 3–2 away victory against giants Juventus on 2 March.

==== Loan spells ====
On 27 January 2009, Waigo signed for Serie B side Lecce on loan until the end of the season. While on loan he played six games but failed to score for the club.

On 2 September 2009, Waigo signed a season long loan with Football League One side, Southampton. The season long loan carried with it an option for Southampton to purchase the player which was not taken up. He made his debut on 13 September 2009 in a 1–1 draw at Charlton Athletic, replacing Adam Lallana in the 90th minute.

He scored his first goal for the club on 3 October 2009 in a 4–1 home win over Gillingham. He celebrated with his trademark 'Waigo Dance', involving him stepping ungainly thrice, before tapping his neck twice. He followed this up by scoring twice against Torquay United, as the Saints came from 2–0 down at half time to draw 2–2 and then win on penalties (with Waigo converting his) in the Football League Trophy. Waigo also scored twice in the Area Semi-final against Norwich City, which took the game to penalties. Waigo also took a penalty which he scored. He also scored in the Football League Trophy final which took place at Wembley Stadium. He was able to lift up the trophy as Southampton won it 4–1. He finished that competition top goalscorer with five goals.

On 4 January 2011, Waigo moved on loan to Grosseto.

=== Ascoli Calcio ===
On his return from the latest loan spell, on 10 August 2011, he was transferred to Serie B side Ascoli on a free transfer.

=== Al Wahda ===
On 25 June 2012, Waigo moved to the UAE, to sign for Al-Wahda on a two-year deal.

== International career ==
Waigo plays international football for North-West African nation Senegal and was part of the Senegalese squad for the 2008 African Cup of Nations in Ghana. He played four matches (out of possible six) at 2010 FIFA World Cup qualification.

== Honours ==
Southampton

- Football League Trophy: 2010
