= 2002–03 Blackburn Rovers F.C. season =

Blackburn Rovers
2002–03 season
- Manager: Graeme Souness
- Premier League: 6th
- FA Cup: Fourth round
- League Cup: Semi-finals
- UEFA Cup: Second round
- Top goalscorer: League: Damien Duff (9); All: Dwight Yorke (13)
- Highest home attendance: 30,475 (vs. Manchester United, 22 December 2002)
- Lowest home attendance: 21,096 (vs. Fulham, 30 November 2002)
- Average home league attendance: 26,225

During the 2002–03 English football season, Blackburn Rovers competed in the FA Premier League.

== Season summary ==
After a season of consolidation in the Premiership the previous season (capped with victory in the League Cup), Blackburn Rovers enjoyed their best season since winning the title in 1995, finishing in sixth place and qualifying for the UEFA Cup for the second year in a row. While their UEFA Cup campaign was not especially impressive (only beating CSKA Sofia on away goals before being knocked out by eventual runners-up Celtic), their continued progress under Graeme Souness gave the fans much hope for the following season. Blackburn also embarked on another strong run in the League Cup for the second successive year, although they failed to defend their title after suffering a 4-2 aggregate defeat to Manchester United in the semi-finals. The star man for Blackburn this season was American goalkeeper Brad Friedel, who was named as the goalkeeper in the PFA Team of the Year.

== Final league table ==
Pos	Team	Pld	W	D	L	GF	GA	GD	Pts	Qualification or relegation
4	Chelsea	38	19	10	9	68	38	+30	67	Qualification for the Champions League third qualifying round
5	Liverpool	38	18	10	10	61	41	+20	64	Qualification for the UEFA Cup first round (Note: Since Liverpool qualified for the UEFA Cup via the league, their place in the UEFA Cup as League Cup winners reverted to the league and was awarded to Blackburn Rovers as the highest-placed team not already qualified for European competitions.)
6	Blackburn Rovers	38	16	12	10	52	43	+9	60	Qualification for the UEFA Cup first round
7	Everton	38	17	8	13	48	49	−1	59	
8	Southampton	38	13	13	12	43	46	−3	52	Qualification for the UEFA Cup first round (Note: Since Arsenal qualified for the Champions League, their place in the UEFA Cup as FA Cup winners went to Southampton, who were the FA Cup runners-up.)

Source: Premier League
Rules for classification: 1) points; 2) goal difference; 3) number of goals scored.

== First-team squad ==
Squad at end of season

Note: Flags indicate national team as defined under FIFA eligibility rules; some limited exceptions apply. Players may hold more than one non-FIFA nationality.

No.	Pos.	Nation	Player
1	GK	USA	Brad Friedel
2	DF	AUS	Lucas Neill
3	MF	TUR	Tugay Kerimoğlu
4	DF	ENG	Andy Todd
6	DF	ENG	Craig Short
7	MF	ENG	Garry Flitcroft
8	MF	ENG	David Dunn
9	FW	ENG	Andy Cole
10	FW	ENG	Matt Jansen
11	MF	IRL	Damien Duff
12	FW	ITA	Corrado Grabbi
13	GK	IRL	Alan Kelly
14	DF	SWE	Nils-Eric Johansson
15	FW	ENG	Craig Hignett
16	MF	IRL	Alan Mahon

No.	Pos.	Nation	Player
17	DF	ENG	John Curtis
18	MF	NIR	Keith Gillespie
19	FW	TRI	Dwight Yorke
20	MF	ENG	David Thompson
21	DF	ENG	Martin Taylor
22	FW	NOR	Egil Østenstad
23	DF	GER	Sebastian Pelzer
25	DF	NOR	Henning Berg
26	DF	SVK	Vratislav Greško (on loan from Parma)
29	MF	IRL	Jonathan Douglas
31	FW	SCO	Paul Gallagher
33	FW	TUR	Hakan Şükür
34	DF	ENG	Jay McEveley
35	MF	ENG	Neil Danns
36	FW	ENG	Marc Richards

=== Left club during season ===
Note: Flags indicate national team as defined under FIFA eligibility rules; some limited exceptions apply. Players may hold more than one non-FIFA nationality.

No.	Pos.	Nation	Player
5	DF	NOR	Stig Inge Bjørnebye (retired)
10	FW	ENG	Matt Jansen (on loan to Coventry City)

No.	Pos.	Nation	Player
20	MF	TUR	Hakan Ünsal (to Galatasaray)
27	GK	ENG	Alan Miller (retired)

== Reserve squad ==
Note: Flags indicate national team as defined under FIFA eligibility rules; some limited exceptions apply. Players may hold more than one non-FIFA nationality.

No.	Pos.	Nation	Player
24	MF	ENG	Darren Dunning
30	DF	SCO	Gordon Greer

No.	Pos.	Nation	Player
32	GK	ENG	Ryan Robinson

== Statistics ==
=== Appearances and goals ===
No.	Pos	Nat	Player	Total		Premier League		FA Cup		League Cup		UEFA Cup	
No.	Pos	Nat	Player	Apps	Goals	Apps	Goals	Apps	Goals	Apps	Goals	Apps	Goals
Goalkeepers
1	GK	(United States) USA	Brad Friedel	47	0	37	0	3	0	3	0	4	0
13	GK	(Republic of Ireland) IRL	Alan Kelly	3	0	1	0	0	0	2	0	0	0
Defenders
2	DF	(Australia) AUS	Lucas Neill	45	0	34	0	3	0	4	0	4	0
4	DF	(England) ENG	Andy Todd	19	1	7+5	1	2	0	4	0	1	0
6	DF	(England) ENG	Craig Short	30	1	26+1	1	0	0	1	0	2	0
14	DF	(Sweden) SWE	Nils-Eric Johansson	39	0	20+10	0	1+1	0	2+1	0	4	0
17	DF	(England) ENG	John Curtis	7	0	5	0	0	0	1	0	1	0
21	DF	(England) ENG	Martin Taylor	42	2	29+4	2	3	0	3	0	3	0
23	DF	(Germany) GER	Sebastian Pelzer	1	0	0	0	0	0	1	0	0	0
25	DF	(Norway) NOR	Henning Berg	19	1	15+1	1	1	0	0	0	1+1	0
26	DF	(Slovakia) SVK	Vratislav Greško	10	0	10	0	0	0	0	0	0	0
34	DF	(England) ENG	Jay McEveley	15	0	9	0	2	0	3+1	0	0	0
Midfielders
3	MF	(Turkey) TUR	Tugay Kerimoğlu	48	1	32+5	1	2+1	0	4	0	4	0
7	MF	(England) ENG	Garry Flitcroft	40	4	33	2	2	2	3+1	0	1	0
8	MF	(England) ENG	David Dunn	36	8	26+2	8	2	0	2	0	3+1	0
11	MF	(Republic of Ireland) IRL	Damien Duff	31	11	26	9	0	0	2	1	3	1
15	MF	(England) ENG	Craig Hignett	4	1	1+2	1	0	0	0	0	1	0
16	MF	(Republic of Ireland) IRL	Alan Mahon	3	0	0+2	0	0	0	1	0	0	0
18	MF	(Northern Ireland) NIR	Keith Gillespie	34	0	10+15	0	0+2	0	2+2	0	0+3	0
20	MF	(England) ENG	David Thompson	32	6	23	4	2	0	4	1	3	1
29	MF	(Republic of Ireland) IRL	Jonathan Douglas	5	0	0+1	0	1+2	0	0+1	0	0	0
35	MF	(England) ENG	Neil Danns	6	0	1+1	0	1	0	2	0	1	0
Forwards
9	FW	(England) ENG	Andy Cole	43	13	32+2	7	2	2	4	4	2+1	0
10	FW	(England) ENG	Matt Jansen	13	2	0+7	0	2	2	1+2	0	0+1	0
12	FW	(Italy) ITA	Corrado Grabbi	15	3	1+10	1	0+1	0	1+1	1	1	1
19	FW	(Trinidad and Tobago) TRI	Dwight Yorke	43	13	25+8	8	3	3	4	2	3	0
22	FW	(Norway) NOR	Egil Østenstad	25	2	8+9	1	1+2	0	0+2	0	2+1	1
31	FW	(Scotland) SCO	Paul Gallagher	1	0	0+1	0	0	0	0	0	0	0
33	FW	(Turkey) TUR	Hakan Şükür	9	2	7+2	2	0	0	0	0	0	0
36	FW	(England) ENG	Marc Richards	1	0	0	0	0	0	0+1	0	0	0
Players transferred out during the season
5	DF	(Norway) NOR	Stig Inge Bjørnebye	1	0	0	0	0	0	1	0	0	0

Last updated: 31 May 2003

== Transfers ==
=== In ===
- (England) Andy Todd - (England) Charlton Athletic, 22 May, £750,000 (rising to £1,000,000 depending on appearances)
- (Germany) Sebastian Pelzer - (Germany) 1. FC Kaiserslautern II, 25 June, undisclosed
- (Trinidad and Tobago) Dwight Yorke - (England) Manchester United, 26 July, £2,000,000 (rising to £2,600,000 depending on appearances and team performance)
- (England) David Thompson - (England) Coventry City, 29 August, £1,500,000 (rising to £2,500,000 depending on player and team performances)
- (Turkey) Hakan Şükür - unattached (last played for (Italy) Parma), 4 December, free
- (Slovakia) Vratislav Greško - (Italy) Parma, 11 February, four-month loan

=== Out ===
- (Wales) Mark Hughes - released, 13 May
- (England) Simon Grayson - (England) Blackpool, 19 July, free
- (Turkey) Hakan Ünsal - (Turkey) Galatasaray, 27 August, £650,000
- (England) Matt Jansen - (England) Coventry City, 18 February, four-month loan
- (Norway) Stig Inge Bjørnebye - retired, 11 March
- (England) Alan Miller - retired, 7 April
- (Wales) James Thomas - released

== Results ==
=== Premier League ===
==== Results by matchday ====
Matchday	1	2	3	4	5	6	7	8	9	10	11	12	13	14	15	16	17	18	19	20	21	22	23	24	25	26	27	28	29	30	31	32	33	34	35	36	37	38
Ground	H	A	H	A	H	A	H	A	H	H	A	H	A	H	A	H	A	A	H	A	H	H	A	H	A	A	H	A	H	H	A	A	H	A	H	A	H	A
Result	D	W	D	L	L	D	W	W	L	W	W	D	D	L	L	W	D	L	W	D	D	W	D	D	L	L	W	W	W	W	L	W	W	L	D	W	D	W
Position	10	9	9	10	15	14	10	9	10	8	8	8	8	8	9	9	10	10	9	10	11	8	10	9	11	12	11	9	8	7	8	7	7	7	7	7	7	6

Source: worldfootball.net
A = Away; H = Home; W = Win; D = Draw; L = Loss

17 August 2002 1	Blackburn Rovers	0–0	Sunderland	Blackburn
		Report		Stadium: Ewood Park; Attendance: 27,122; Referee: David Elleray

24 August 2002 2	Birmingham City	0–1	Blackburn Rovers	Birmingham
15:00 BST (UTC+01)		Report	Yorke 13'	Stadium: St. Andrew's; Attendance: 28,563; Referee: Dermot Gallagher

28 August 2002 3	Blackburn Rovers	2–2	Liverpool	Blackburn
	Dunn 15'; Grabbi 83'	Report	Murphy 31'; Riise 77'	Stadium: Ewood Park; Attendance: 29,207; Referee: Steve Bennett

31 August 2002 4	Middlesbrough	1–0	Blackburn Rovers	Middlesbrough
	Job 90'	Report		Stadium: Riverside Stadium

11 September 2002 5	Blackburn Rovers	2–3	Chelsea	Blackburn
	David Dunn 18' (pen.); David Thompson 45'	Report	Jesper Grønkjær 38'; Gianfranco Zola 52', 80'	Stadium: Ewood Park

15 September 2002 6	Manchester City	2–2	Blackburn Rovers	Manchester
15:00	Anelka 80'; Goater 90'; Tiatto (red card) 67'	Report	Thompson 26'; Cole 54'	Stadium: Maine Road; Attendance: 34,130

22 September 2002 7	Blackburn Rovers	1–0	Leeds United	Blackburn
	Flitcroft 24'	Report		Stadium: Ewood Park; Attendance: 25,415; Referee: Graham Poll

30 September 2002 8	West Bromwich Albion	0–2	Blackburn Rovers	West Bromwich
		Report	Dwight Yorke 72' (pen.); Damien Duff 76'	Stadium: The Hawthorns

6 October 2002 9	Blackburn Rovers	1–2	Tottenham Hotspur	Blackburn
	Egil Østenstad 59'	Report	Robbie Keane 6'; Jamie Redknapp 89'	Stadium: Ewood Park

19 October 2002 10	Blackburn Rovers	5–2	Newcastle United	Blackburn
15:00	Dunn 5' (pen.), 8'; Taylor 55', 74'; Griffin 65' (o.g.)	Report	Dabizas (red card) 4'; Shearer 36' (pen.), 48'	Stadium: Ewood Park; Attendance: 27,307; Referee: Alan Wiley

26 October 2002 11	Arsenal	1–2	Blackburn Rovers	London
15:00 BST	Edu 45'; Henry (yellow card) 83'	Report	Edu 6' (o.g.); Østenstad (yellow card) 37'; Johansson (yellow card) 45'; Yorke 51'; Flitcroft (yellow card) 70' (yellow-red card) 79'	Stadium: Highbury; Attendance: 38,064; Referee: Graham Barber

3 November 2002 12	Blackburn Rovers	0–0	Aston Villa	Blackburn
		Report		Stadium: Ewood Park

9 November 2002 13	Southampton	1–1	Blackburn Rovers	Southampton
	James Beattie 38' (pen.)	Report	Andy Cole 90'	Stadium: St Mary's Stadium

17 November 2002 14	Blackburn Rovers	0–1	Everton	Blackburn
		Report	Kevin Campbell 19'	Stadium: Ewood Park

24 November 2002 15	Charlton Athletic	3–1	Blackburn Rovers	Charlton, London
	Paul Konchesky 59'; Richard Rufus 74'; Jason Euell 90'	Report	David Thompson 60'	Stadium: The Valley

30 November 2002 16	Blackburn Rovers	2–1	Fulham	Blackburn
	Dwight Yorke 36'; Rufus Brevett 77' (o.g.)	Report	Steve Marlet 60'	Stadium: Ewood Park; Attendance: 21,096

7 December 2002 17	Bolton Wanderers	1–1	Blackburn Rovers	Horwich
	Jay-Jay Okocha 8'	Report	Craig Short 90'	Stadium: University of Bolton Stadium

14 December 2002 18	Everton	2–1	Blackburn Rovers	Walton, Liverpool
	Lee Carsley 12'; Wayne Rooney 25'	Report	Andy Cole 6'	Stadium: Goodison Park

22 December 2002 19	Blackburn Rovers	1–0	Manchester United	Blackburn
	Garry Flitcroft 40'	Report		Stadium: Ewood Park

26 December 2002 20	Liverpool	1–1	Blackburn Rovers	Liverpool
	Riise 17'	Report	Cole 77'	Stadium: Anfield; Attendance: 43,075; Referee: Neale Barry

28 December 2002 21	Blackburn Rovers	2–2	West Ham United	Blackburn
	Damien Duff 4'; Andy Cole 78'	Report	Martin Taylor 24' (o.g.); Jermain Defoe 86'	Stadium: Ewood Park

1 January 2003 22	Blackburn Rovers	1–0	Middlesbrough	Blackburn
	Dwight Yorke 57'	Report		Stadium: Ewood Park

11 January 2003 23	Sunderland	0–0	Blackburn Rovers	Sunderland
		Report		Stadium: Stadium of Light

18 January 2003 24	Blackburn Rovers	1–1	Birmingham City	Blackburn
15:00 GMT (UTC)	Duff 19'; Todd (red card) 28'	Report	John 83'	Stadium: Ewood Park; Attendance: 23,331; Referee: Clive Wilkes

29 January 2003 25	West Ham United	2–1	Blackburn Rovers	Upton Park, London
	Paolo Di Canio 58' (pen.); Jermain Defoe 89'	Report	Dwight Yorke 38'	Stadium: Boleyn Ground

2 February 2003 26	Aston Villa	3–0	Blackburn Rovers	Aston, Birmingham
	Dion Dublin 2', 40'; Gareth Barry 81'	Report		Stadium: Villa Park

8 February 2003 27	Blackburn Rovers	1–0	Southampton	Blackburn
	David Thompson 26'	Report		Stadium: Ewood Park

22 February 2003 28	Chelsea	1–2	Blackburn Rovers	Fulham, London
	Jimmy Floyd Hasselbaink 90'	Report	Dwight Yorke 86'; David Dunn 90'	Stadium: Stamford Bridge

1 March 2003 29	Blackburn Rovers	1–0	Manchester City	Blackburn
15:00	Dunn 13'	Report		Stadium: Ewood Park; Attendance: 28,647; Referee: Steve Dunn

15 March 2003 30	Blackburn Rovers	2–0	Arsenal	Blackburn
	Duff 22'; Tugay 52'	Report		Stadium: Ewood Park

22 March 2003 31	Newcastle United	5–1	Blackburn Rovers	Newcastle upon Tyne
15:00	Solano 24'; Robert 61'; Jenas 85'; Gresko 89' (o.g.); Bellamy 90'	Report	Duff 54'	Stadium: St James' Park; Attendance: 52,106; Referee: Neale Barry

7 April 2003 32	Fulham	0–4	Blackburn Rovers	White City, London
		Report	David Dunn 37' (pen.); Hakan Şükür 42', 54'; Damien Duff 53'	Stadium: Loftus Road

12 April 2003 33	Blackburn Rovers	1–0	Charlton Athletic	Blackburn
	Damien Duff 34'	Report		Stadium: Ewood Park

19 April 2003 34	Manchester United	3–1	Blackburn Rovers	Old Trafford, Manchester
	Ruud van Nistelrooy 20'; Paul Scholes 42', 61'	Report	Henning Berg 24'	Stadium: Old Trafford

21 April 2003 35	Blackburn Rovers	0–0	Bolton Wanderers	Blackburn
		Report		Stadium: Ewood Park; Attendance: 28,862; Referee: Mike Dean

26 April 2003 36	Leeds United	2–3	Blackburn Rovers	Leeds, West Yorkshire
	Viduka 21'; Smith 90'	Report	Dunn 38' (pen.); A. Cole 69'; Todd 78'	Stadium: Elland Road

3 May 2003 37	Blackburn Rovers	1–1	West Bromwich Albion	Blackburn
	Damien Duff 11'	Report	Jason Koumas 54'	Stadium: Ewood Park

11 May 2003 38	Tottenham Hotspur	0–4	Blackburn Rovers	Tottenham, London
		Report	Dwight Yorke 5'; Craig Hignett 45'; Damien Duff 48'; Andy Cole 60'	Stadium: White Hart Lane

=== FA Cup ===
4 January 2003 3	Aston Villa	1–4	Blackburn Rovers
	Juan Pablo Angel 41'		Matt Jansen 17', 60'; Dwight Yorke 52', 71'	Attendance: 23,884

25 January 2003 4	Blackburn Rovers	3–3	Sunderland	Blackburn
	Andy Cole 14', 73'; Dwight Yorke 90'		Marcus Stewart 2'; Michael Proctor 52'; Kevin Phillips 70'	Stadium: Ewood Park; Attendance: 14,315

5 February 2003 4R	Sunderland	2–2 (a.e.t.) (3-0 p)	Blackburn Rovers
	Kevin Phillips 10'; Gavin McCann 79'		Garry Flitcroft 50', 90'	Attendance: 15,745
	Penalties
	Kevin Phillips (penalty scored); Kevin Kilbane (penalty scored); Jody Craddock (penalty missed); Gavin McCann (penalty scored)		(penalty missed) David Thompson; (penalty missed) Andy Cole; (penalty missed) Corrado Grabbi

=== League Cup ===
6 November 2002 3	Blackburn Rovers	2–2 (a.e.t.) (5–4 p)	Walsall	Blackburn
	Corrado Grabbi 45'; Ian Roper 105' (o.g.)		Zigor Aranalde 67' (pen.); David Zdrilic 98'	Stadium: Ewood Park
	Penalties
	John Curtis (penalty scored); Corrado Grabbi (penalty scored); David Dunn (penalty scored); Alan Mahon (penalty scored); Marc Richards (penalty scored)		(penalty scored) Danny Sonner; (penalty scored) Tony Barras; (penalty missed) Darren Wrack; (penalty scored) Darren Bazeley; (penalty scored) David Zdrilic

4 December 2002 4	Blackburn Rovers	4–0	Rotherham United	Blackburn
	Yorke 12', 39'; Cole 16'; Duff 43'			Stadium: Ewood Park; Attendance: 11,220; Referee: Matt Messias

17 December 2002 5	Wigan Athletic	0–2	Blackburn Rovers	Wigan
			Cole 16', 80'	Stadium: JJB Stadium; Attendance: 16,922; Referee: Andy D'Urso

7 January 2003 Semi Final; Leg 1	Manchester United	1–1	Blackburn Rovers	Manchester
20:00	Scholes 58'	Report	Thompson 61'	Stadium: Old Trafford; Attendance: 62,740; Referee: Uriah Rennie

22 January 2003 Semi Final; Leg 2	Blackburn Rovers	1–3	Manchester United	Blackburn
20:00	Cole 12'	Report	Scholes 30', 42' van Nistelrooy 77' (pen.)	Stadium: Ewood Park; Attendance: 29,048; Referee: Jeff Winter

=== UEFA Cup ===
19 September 2002 Round 1 Leg 1	Blackburn Rovers	1–1	CSKA Sofia	Blackburn
	Corrado Grabbi 27'		Velizar Dimitrov 23'	Stadium: Ewood Park; Referee: Bruno Coué (France)

3 October 2002 Round 1 Leg 2	CSKA Sofia	3–3	Blackburn Rovers
	Emil Gargorov 66', 88' (pen.); Agnaldo 69'		David Thompson 30'; Egil Østenstad 56'; Damien Duff 58'	Referee: Alon Yefet (Israel)

31 October 2002 Round 2 Leg 1	Celtic	1–0	Blackburn Rovers
	Henrik Larsson 85'			Referee: Hermann Albrecht (Germany)

14 November 2002 Round 2 Leg 2	Blackburn Rovers	0–2	Celtic	Blackburn
			Henrik Larsson 15'; Chris Sutton 68'	Stadium: Ewood Park; Referee: Cosimo Bolognino (Italy)

=== Scores Overview ===
Win Draw Loss

Opposition	Home score	Away score	Double
Arsenal	2–0	2–1	4–1
Aston Villa	0–0	0–3	0–3
Birmingham City	1–1	1–0	1–0
Bolton Wanderers	0–0	1–1	1–1
Charlton Athletic	1–0	1–3	2–3
Chelsea	2–3	2–1	4–4
Everton	0–1	1–2	1–3
Fulham	2–1	4–0	6–1
Leeds United	1–0	3–2	4–2
Liverpool	2–2	1–1	3–3
Manchester City	1–0	2–2	3–2
Manchester United	1–0	1–3	2–3
Middlesbrough	1–0	0–1	1–1
Newcastle United	5–2	1–5	6–7
Southampton	1–0	1–1	2–1
Sunderland	0–0	0–0	0–0
Tottenham Hotspur	1–2	4–0	5–2
West Bromwich Albion	1–1	2–0	3–1
West Ham United	2–2	1–2	3–4
