= 2000–01 Blackburn Rovers F.C. season =

Blackburn Rovers
2000–01 season
- Chairman: Robert Coar
- Manager: Graeme Souness
- First Division: 2nd (promoted)
- FA Cup: Quarter-finals
- League Cup: Third round
- Top goalscorer: League: Matt Jansen (23); All: Matt Jansen (24)
- Average home league attendance: 20,740
Home colours

During the 2000–01 English football season, Blackburn Rovers F.C. competed in the Football League First Division (known as the Nationwide Division One for sponsorship reasons).

== Season summary ==
Rovers returned to the top flight of English football, thanks to a second-place finish in Division One which came two seasons after relegation. Rovers looked intent on returning to the top flight in style fulfilling the wishes of late owner Jack Walker who died shortly after the season began. Striker Matt Jansen, signed during the relegation campaign, was the club's top scorer with 23 Division One goals. Rovers also re-signed Henning Berg just after the start of the season, three years after they sold him to Manchester United. Berg was one of the club's last remaining links with the 1995 title winning side.

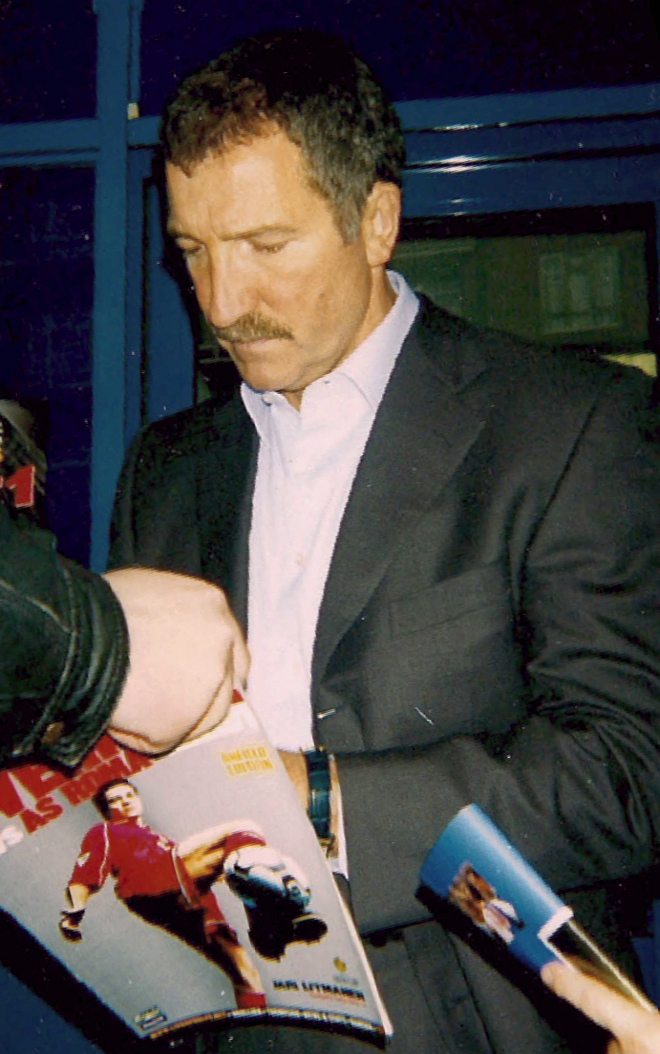
Souness signing autographs outside Loftus Road following Queens Park Rangers vs Blackburn Rovers on 7 April 2001.

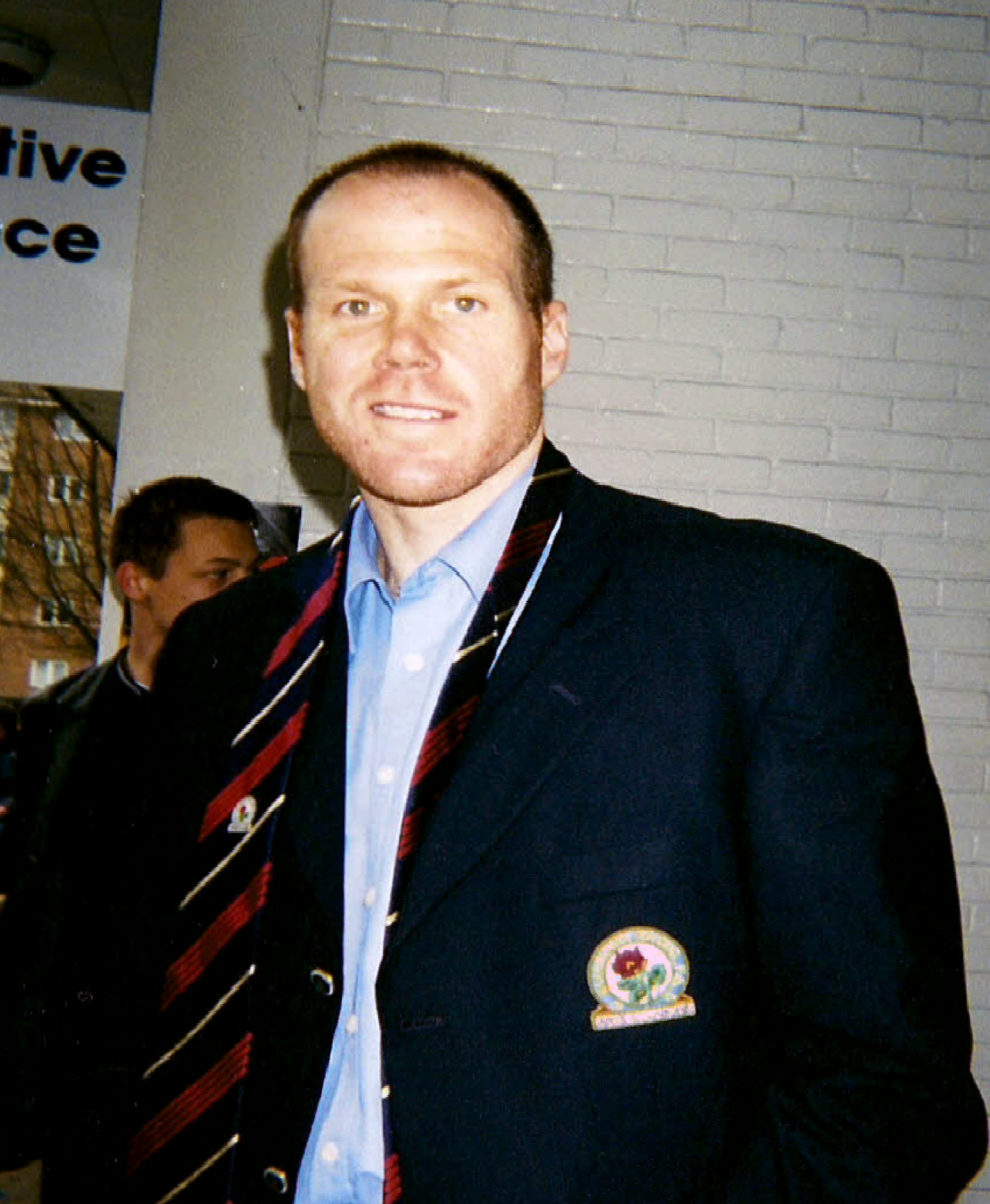
Friedel posing for picture outside Loftus Road following Queens Park Rangers vs Blackburn Rovers on 7 April 2001.

== Final league table ==
Pos	Team	Pld	W	D	L	GF	GA	GD	Pts	Qualification or relegation
1	Fulham (C, P)	46	30	11	5	90	32	+58	101	Promotion to the Premier League
2	Blackburn Rovers (P)	46	26	13	7	76	39	+37	91	Promotion to the Premier League
3	Bolton Wanderers (O, P)	46	24	15	7	76	45	+31	87	Qualification for the First Division play-offs
4	Preston North End	46	23	9	14	64	52	+12	78	Qualification for the First Division play-offs
5	Birmingham City	46	23	9	14	59	48	+11	78	Qualification for the First Division play-offs
6	West Bromwich Albion	46	21	11	14	60	52	+8	74	Qualification for the First Division play-offs
7	Burnley	46	21	9	16	50	54	−4	72	
8	Wimbledon	46	17	18	11	71	50	+21	69	
9	Watford	46	20	9	17	76	67	+9	69	
10	Sheffield United	46	19	11	16	52	49	+3	68	
11	Nottingham Forest	46	20	8	18	55	53	+2	68	
12	Wolverhampton Wanderers	46	14	13	19	45	48	−3	55	
13	Gillingham	46	13	16	17	61	66	−5	55	
14	Crewe Alexandra	46	15	10	21	47	62	−15	55	
15	Norwich City	46	14	12	20	46	58	−12	54	
16	Barnsley	46	15	9	22	49	62	−13	54	
17	Sheffield Wednesday	46	15	8	23	52	71	−19	53	
18	Grimsby Town	46	14	10	22	43	62	−19	52	
19	Stockport County	46	11	18	17	58	65	−7	51	
20	Portsmouth	46	10	19	17	47	59	−12	49	
21	Crystal Palace	46	12	13	21	57	70	−13	49	
22	Huddersfield Town (R)	46	11	15	20	48	57	−9	48	Relegation to the Second Division
23	Queens Park Rangers (R)	46	7	19	20	45	75	−30	40	Relegation to the Second Division
24	Tranmere Rovers (R)	46	9	11	26	46	77	−31	38	Relegation to the Second Division

Rules for classification: 1) Points; 2) Goal difference; 3) Goals scored
(C) Champions; (O) Play-off winners; (P) Promoted; (R) Relegated

== Results ==
Blackburn Rovers' score comes first

=== Legend ===
Win	Draw	Loss

=== Football League First Division ===
Date	Opponent	Venue	Result	Attendance	Scorers
12 August 2000	Crystal Palace	H	2–0	18,733	Blake, Jansen
19 August 2000	Crewe Alexandra	A	0–0	7,500	
26 August 2000	Norwich City	H	3–2	19,542	Dunn (pen), Blake, Jansen
28 August 2000	Sheffield Wednesday	A	1–1	15,646	Taylor
9 September 2000	Nottingham Forest	H	3–0	18,471	Jansen, Dunn (pen), Blake
12 September 2000	Watford	H	3–4	17,258	Dunn, Blake (2)
15 September 2000	Sheffield United	A	0–2	10,816	
23 September 2000	Bolton Wanderers	H	1–1	23,660	Thomas
30 September 2000	West Bromwich Albion	A	0–1	16,794	
15 October 2000	Fulham	A	1–2	15,247	Jansen
18 October 2000	Wimbledon	A	2–0	6,019	Willmott (own goal), Flitcroft
21 October 2000	Grimsby Town	H	2–0	16,397	Flitcroft, Jansen
25 October 2000	Tranmere Rovers	H	3–2	17,010	Hughes (2), Østenstad
28 October 2000	Huddersfield Town	A	1–0	12,287	Østenstad
4 November 2000	Stockport County	H	2–1	17,404	Hughes, Hignett
8 November 2000	Barnsley	A	2–1	13,622	Jansen, Dunn
11 November 2000	Portsmouth	A	2–2	14,141	Bjørnebye, Jansen
18 November 2000	Wolverhampton Wanderers	H	1–0	20,380	Dunn (pen)
25 November 2000	Gillingham	H	1–2	18,061	Hughes
2 December 2000	Tranmere Rovers	A	1–1	10,063	Dunn
9 December 2000	Queens Park Rangers	H	0–0	16,886	
17 December 2000	Burnley	A	2–0	21,369	McAteer, Bent
22 December 2000	Crystal Palace	A	3–2	15,010	Dunn (2, 1 pen), Taylor
26 December 2000	Birmingham City	H	2–1	24,899	Jansen (2)
30 December 2000	Crewe Alexandra	H	1–0	18,554	Jansen
1 January 2001	Norwich City	A	1–1	16,695	Bent
10 January 2001	Preston North End	H	3–2	23,983	Jansen (2), Hughes
13 January 2001	Sheffield Wednesday	H	2–0	19,308	Bent, Taylor
3 February 2001	Barnsley	H	0–0	18,573	
10 February 2001	Nottingham Forest	A	1–2	22,455	Jansen
20 February 2001	Watford	A	1–0	15,970	Bent
23 February 2001	Bolton Wanderers	A	4–1	20,017	Bent, Dunn, Jansen, Hignett
3 March 2001	West Bromwich Albion	H	1–0	23,926	Bent
14 March 2001	Birmingham City	A	2–0	29,150	Bent, Duff
17 March 2001	Wimbledon	H	1–1	19,000	Jansen
1 April 2001	Burnley	H	5–0	23,442	Short, Davis (own goal), Jansen (2), Hignett
4 April 2001	Sheffield United	H	1–1	26,276	Berg
7 April 2001	Queens Park Rangers	A	3–1	12,449	Dunn, Jansen, Berkovic
11 April 2001	Fulham	H	1–2	21,578	Jansen
14 April 2001	Stockport County	A	0–0	9,705	
16 April 2001	Huddersfield Town	H	2–0	29,426	Flitcroft, Jansen
21 April 2001	Wolverhampton Wanderers	A	0–0	20,018	
24 April 2001	Grimsby Town	A	4–1	6,507	Dunn, Berkovic, Jansen (2)
29 April 2001	Portsmouth	H	3–1	24,257	Hiley (own goal), Dunn, Bent
2 May 2001	Preston North End	A	1–0	16,975	Jansen
6 May 2001	Gillingham	A	1–1	10,319	Blake

=== FA Cup ===
Round	Date	Opponent	Venue	Result	Attendance	Goalscorers
R3	6 January 2001	Chester City	H	2–0	15,223	Taylor, Bent
R4	27 January 2001	Derby County	H	0–0	18,858	
R4R	7 February 2001	Derby County	A	5–2	15,203	Flitcroft, Bent (2), Dunn (pen), Jansen
R5	17 February 2001	Bolton Wanderers	A	1–1	22,048	Dunn
R5R	7 March 2001	Bolton Wanderers	H	3–0	20,318	Flitcroft, Hignett (2, 1 pen)
QF	10 March 2001	Arsenal	A	0–3	36,304	

=== League Cup ===
Round	Date	Opponent	Venue	Result	Attendance	Goalscorers
R1 1st Leg	22 August 2000	Rochdale	A	1–1	4,873	Blake
R1 2nd Leg	6 September 2000	Rochdale	H	6–1 (won 7–2 on agg)	12,977	Duff (2), Dunn (3 pens), Diawara
R2 1st Leg	19 September 2000	Portsmouth	H	4–0	10,360	Carsley, Thomas (2), Østenstad
R2 2nd Leg	26 September 2000	Portsmouth	A	1–1 (won 5–1 on agg)	2,731	Dunn
R3	31 October 2000	West Ham United	A	0–2	21,863	

== First-team squad ==
Squad at end of season

Note: Flags indicate national team as defined under FIFA eligibility rules; some limited exceptions apply. Players may hold more than one non-FIFA nationality.

No.	Pos.	Nation	Player
1	GK	AUS	John Filan
2	DF	ENG	John Curtis
4	MF	IRL	Jason McAteer
5	DF	NOR	Stig Inge Bjørnebye
6	DF	ENG	Craig Short
7	MF	ENG	Garry Flitcroft
8	MF	ENG	David Dunn
9	FW	WAL	Mark Hughes
10	MF	ENG	Craig Hignett
11	MF	IRL	Damien Duff
12	DF	IRL	Jeff Kenna
13	GK	IRL	Alan Kelly
14	FW	WAL	Nathan Blake
15	FW	ENG	Matt Jansen
16	DF	ENG	Marlon Broomes
17	FW	ENG	Marcus Bent
18	MF	NIR	Keith Gillespie

No.	Pos.	Nation	Player
19	MF	NIR	Damien Johnson
20	FW	NOR	Egil Østenstad
21	DF	NOR	Henning Berg
22	MF	ISR	Eyal Berkovic (on loan from Celtic)
23	MF	IRL	Alan Mahon (on loan from Sporting Lisbon)
24	DF	ENG	Darren Dunning
25	DF	ENG	Simon Grayson
26	FW	WAL	James Thomas
27	GK	ENG	Alan Miller
28	DF	ENG	Martin Taylor
29	MF	FRA	Marc Keller
30	FW	IRL	Gary Hamilton
31	MF	SCO	Burton O'Brien
32	GK	USA	Brad Friedel
33	MF	IRL	Jonathan Douglas
34	FW	ENG	Marc Richards
35	FW	ENG	Jonathan Ellison
—	MF	ENG	Jimmy Corbett

=== Left club during season ===
Note: Flags indicate national team as defined under FIFA eligibility rules; some limited exceptions apply. Players may hold more than one non-FIFA nationality.

No.	Pos.	Nation	Player
9	FW	ENG	Ashley Ward (to Bradford City)
3	DF	SCO	Christian Dailly (to West Ham United)
9	FW	FRA	Kaba Diawara (on loan from Paris Saint-Germain)
17	MF	SCO	Billy McKinlay (to Bradford City)

No.	Pos.	Nation	Player
22	FW	IRL	Ben Burgess (to Northern Spirit)
23	MF	ENG	Lee Carsley (to Coventry City)
24	DF	ENG	Steve Harkness (to Sheffield Wednesday)
29	DF	ENG	Darren Peacock (retired)

=== Reserve squad ===
Note: Flags indicate national team as defined under FIFA eligibility rules; some limited exceptions apply. Players may hold more than one non-FIFA nationality.

No. / Pos. / Nation / Player; — / DF / IRL / Fred Murray	No. / Pos. / Nation / Player; — / DF / SCO / David McNamee

== Top scorers ==
=== First Division ===
- (England) Matt Jansen 23
- (England) David Dunn 12
- (England) Marcus Bent 8
- (Wales) Nathan Blake 6
- (Wales) Mark Hughes 5
