= 1996–97 Blackburn Rovers F.C. season =

Blackburn Rovers F.C.
1996–97 season
- Owner: Jack Walker
- Chairman: Robert Coar
- Manager: Ray Harford (until 25 October); Tony Parkes (from 25 October)
- Stadium: Ewood Park
- FA Premier League: 13th
- FA Cup: Fourth round
- League Cup: Third round
- Top goalscorer: League: Chris Sutton (11); All: Chris Sutton (12)
- Average home league attendance: 24,947

During the 1996–97 English football season, Blackburn Rovers F.C. competed in the FA Premier League.

== Season summary ==
An early exit from the League Cup at the hands of Division Two side Stockport County was the final straw for manager Ray Harford, who stepped down on 25 October with Rovers also bottom of the FA Premier League with no wins from their opening 11 games. 18 months earlier, they had been league champions. Long-serving coach Tony Parkes was appointed caretaker, remaining in the post until the end of the season, when he handed over the reins to Roy Hodgson after Sampdoria's Sven-Göran Eriksson lied about accepting the manager's job and joined Lazio instead. Parkes steered Blackburn to safety as they finished 13th.

The world record £15 million sale of striker Alan Shearer to Newcastle United was seen as the biggest factor in Blackburn's lowest top flight finish since they returned to the elite in 1992. However, his strike-partner Chris Sutton helped keep the club alive after recovering from a drastic loss of form triggered by a spate of injuries the previous season. The acquisition of Swedish striker Martin Dahlin at the end of the season enhanced Blackburn's attack and gave fans hope for a higher finish next time round.

== Final league table ==
Pos	Team	Pld	W	D	L	GF	GA	GD	Pts
11	Leeds United	38	11	13	14	28	38	−10	46
12	Derby County	38	11	13	14	45	58	−13	46
13	Blackburn Rovers	38	9	15	14	42	43	−1	42
14	West Ham United	38	10	12	16	39	48	−9	42
15	Everton	38	10	12	16	44	57	−13	42

Source: Premier League
Rules for classification: 1) points; 2) goal difference; 3) number of goals scored.

Results summary

Overall								Home						Away					
Pld	W	D	L	GF	GA	GD	Pts	W	D	L	GF	GA	GD	W	D	L	GF	GA	GD
38	9	15	14	42	43	−1	42	8	4	7	28	23	+5	1	11	7	14	20	−6

Source: Statto

Results by round

Round	1	2	3	4	5	6	7	8	9	10	11	12	13	14	15	16	17	18	19	20	21	22	23	24	25	26	27	28	29	30	31	32	33	34	35	36	37	38
Ground	H	A	A	H	H	A	H	A	H	A	A	H	H	A	H	A	A	H	A	A	H	A	A	H	A	H	A	H	H	A	H	A	H	A	H	A	H	H
Result	L	L	D	L	L	L	D	D	L	D	L	W	D	D	W	D	L	W	D	W	W	D	L	W	D	W	D	D	W	L	L	D	L	D	W	L	D	L
Position	16	19	18	19	19	20	20	20	20	20	20	20	19	19	18	17	17	18	18	17	14	14	16	13	15	14	13	12	12	12	12	13	14	14	13	13	13	13

Source: Statto.com
A = Away; H = Home; W = Win; D = Draw; L = Loss

== Results ==
Blackburn Rovers' score comes first

=== Legend ===
Win	Draw	Loss

=== FA Premier League ===
Date	Opponent	Venue	Result	Attendance	Goalscorers
17 August 1996	Tottenham Hotspur	H	0–2	26,960	
21 August 1996	Aston Villa	A	0–1	32,457	
25 August 1996	Manchester United	A	2–2	54,178	Warhurst, Bohinen
4 September 1996	Leeds United	H	0–1	23,226	
9 September 1996	Derby County	H	1–2	19,214	Sutton
14 September 1996	Newcastle United	A	1–2	36,424	Sutton
21 September 1996	Everton	H	1–1	27,091	Donis
28 September 1996	Coventry City	A	0–0	17,032	
12 October 1996	Arsenal	H	0–2	24,303	
19 October 1996	Sheffield Wednesday	A	1–1	22,191	Bohinen
26 October 1996	West Ham	A	1–2	23,947	Berg
3 November 1996	Liverpool	H	3–0	29,598	Sutton (2), Wilcox
16 November 1996	Chelsea	H	1–1	27,229	Gallacher
25 November 1996	Nottingham Forest	A	2–2	17,525	Gallacher, Wilcox
30 November 1996	Southampton	H	2–1	23,018	Sherwood, Sutton
7 December 1996	Leicester City	A	1–1	19,306	Sutton
14 December 1996	Wimbledon	A	0–1	13,246	
26 December 1996	Newcastle United	H	1–0	30,398	Gallacher
28 December 1996	Derby County	A	0–0	17,847	
1 January 1997	Everton	A	2–0	30,427	Sherwood, Sutton
11 January 1997	Coventry City	H	4–0	24,055	Sutton (2), Gallacher, Donis
18 January 1997	Sunderland	A	0–0	20,850	
29 January 1997	Tottenham Hotspur	A	1–2	22,943	Hendry
1 February 1997	West Ham United	H	2–1	21,994	Gallacher, Sutton
22 February 1997	Liverpool	A	0–0	40,747	
1 March 1997	Sunderland	H	1–0	24,208	Gallacher
5 March 1997	Chelsea	A	1–1	25,784	Pedersen
11 March 1997	Nottingham Forest	H	1–1	20,485	Gallacher
15 March 1997	Wimbledon	H	3–1	23,333	Gallacher (3)
19 March 1997	Middlesbrough	A	1–2	29,891	Sutton
22 March 1997	Aston Villa	H	0–2	24,274	
7 April 1997	Leeds United	H	0–0	27,264	
12 April 1997	Manchester United	H	2–3	30,476	McKinlay, Warhurst
19 April 1997	Arsenal	A	1–1	38,086	Flitcroft
22 April 1997	Sheffield Wednesday	H	4–1	20,845	Berg, Sherwood, Le Saux, Flitcroft
3 May 1997	Southampton	A	0–2	15,247	
8 May 1997	Middlesbrough	H	0–0	27,411	
11 May 1997	Leicester City	H	2–4	25,881	Flitcroft, Fenton

=== FA Cup ===
Round	Date	Opponent	Venue	Result	Attendance	Goalscorers
R3	4 January 1997	Port Vale	H	1–0	19,891	Bohinen
R4	15 February 1997	Coventry City	H	1–2	21,123	Sherwood

=== League Cup ===
Round	Date	Opponent	Venue	Result	Attendance	Goalscorers
R2 1st Leg	17 September 1996	Brentford	A	2–1	8,938	Flitcroft, Sutton
R2 2nd Leg	24 September 1996	Brentford	H	2–0 (won 4–1 on agg)	9,599	Gallacher, Sherwood
R3	22 October 1996	Stockport County	H	0–1	14,622	

== Squad ==
Squad at end of season

Note: Flags indicate national team as defined under FIFA eligibility rules; some limited exceptions apply. Players may hold more than one non-FIFA nationality.

No.	Pos.	Nation	Player
1	GK	ENG	Tim Flowers
2	DF	WAL	Chris Coleman
3	DF	IRL	Jeff Kenna
4	MF	ENG	Tim Sherwood (captain)
5	DF	SCO	Colin Hendry
6	DF	ENG	Graeme Le Saux
7	MF	ENG	Stuart Ripley
8	FW	SCO	Kevin Gallacher
9	FW	ENG	Chris Sutton
10	MF	NOR	Lars Bohinen
11	MF	ENG	Jason Wilcox
12	DF	ENG	Nicky Marker
13	GK	IRL	Shay Given
14	MF	ENG	Graham Fenton
15	MF	ENG	Matty Holmes
16	FW	DEN	Per Pedersen
17	DF	SCO	Billy McKinlay

No.	Pos.	Nation	Player
18	MF	SWE	Niklas Gudmundsson
19	DF	ENG	Adam Reed
20	DF	NOR	Henning Berg
21	MF	GRE	Georgios Donis
23	MF	ENG	Garry Flitcroft
24	DF	ENG	Paul Warhurst
25	DF	ENG	Ian Pearce
26	DF	ENG	Marlon Broomes
27	DF	ENG	Tony Whealing
28	MF	ENG	Wayne Gill
29	DF	ENG	Steve Hitchen
30	FW	ENG	James Beattie
32	MF	IRL	Damien Duff
33	DF	NIR	Damien Johnson
34	DF	ENG	Gary Croft
35	FW	WAL	James Thomas

=== Reserve squad ===
Note: Flags indicate national team as defined under FIFA eligibility rules; some limited exceptions apply. Players may hold more than one non-FIFA nationality.

No.	Pos.	Nation	Player
-	GK	ENG	Gareth Stewart
-	GK	WAL	Anthony Williams

No.	Pos.	Nation	Player
-	DF	IRL	Graham Coughlan
-	DF	IRL	David Worrell

== Transfers ==
=== In ===
- July 1996: George Donis - Panathinaikos, free
- February 1997: Per Pedersen - Odense, £2,500,000

=== Out ===
- Alan Shearer - Newcastle United, £15,000,000
