= David Dunn =

English footballer (born 1979)

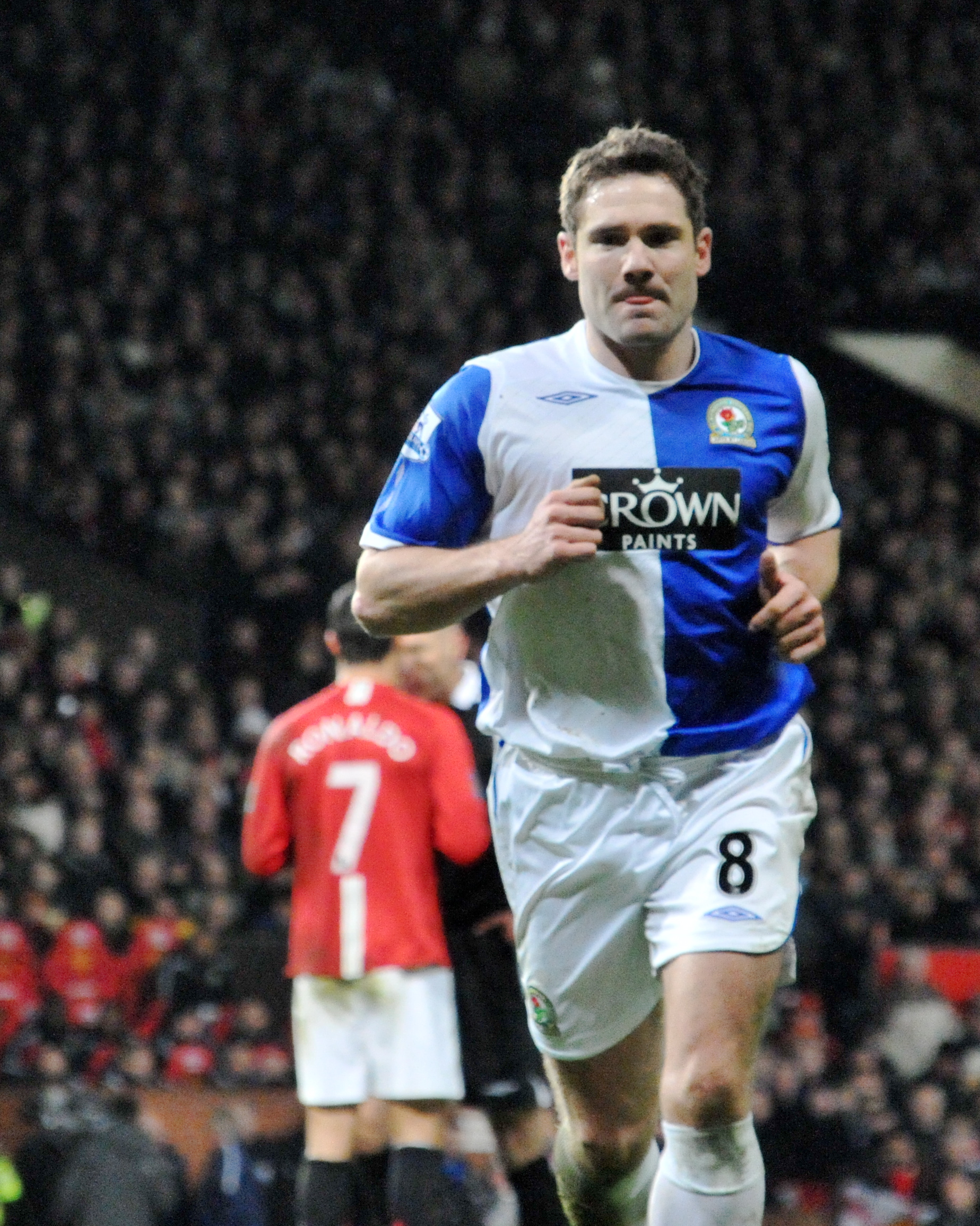
- Dunn playing for Blackburn Rovers in 2009

Personal information
- Full name: David John Ian Dunn
- Date of birth: 27 December 1979 (age 46)
- Place of birth: Great Harwood, England
- Height: 5 ft 10 in (1.78 m)
- Position: Attacking midfielder

Youth career
- 1997–1998: Blackburn Rovers

Senior career*
Years	Team	Apps	(Gls)
1998–2003	Blackburn Rovers	136	(30)
2003–2007	Birmingham City	58	(7)
2007–2015	Blackburn Rovers	180	(20)
2015–2016	Oldham Athletic	8	(0)
Total		382	(57)

International career
1998	England U18	3	(0)
1998–2002	England U21	20	(3)
2002	England	1	(0)

Managerial career
- 2015–2016: Oldham Athletic
- 2017–2018: Blackburn Rovers U-23 (co-manager)
- 2020: Blackpool (caretaker)
- 2020: Barrow
- * Club domestic league appearances and goals

David John Ian Dunn (born 27 December 1979) is an English former professional football player, manager and coach.

Dunn played as an attacking midfielder and spent the majority of his playing career representing Blackburn Rovers. His first stint began as a youth team player in 1997, and he signed professional terms a year later. During this time, Dunn helped the club to win promotion out of the First Division in 2000–01, as well as lift the League Cup the following season. He also made his only appearance for England in 2002. He was sold to Premier League rivals Birmingham City for £5.5 million a year later before returning to Blackburn in 2007 for a fee of £2.2 million; continuing as a crucial squad member. He remained there until 2015, with them now a Championship club, when he signed for Oldham Athletic, his final club as a player before his retirement under a year later.

He was player-manager at Oldham between September 2015 and January 2016 and then Blackburn's under-23s and first-team assistant coach. In 2020, he was a coach and briefly caretaker manager at Blackpool, and had five months as manager of Barrow.

== Early life ==
David John Ian Dunn was born on 27 December 1979 in Great Harwood, Lancashire. Dunn joined Blackburn Rovers as a schoolboy. After leaving St Augustine's School, Billington, he was taken on the Youth Training Scheme upon joining the club, which is just down the road from the club's Brockhall training ground. Dunn reflected on his school life, saying: "I wasn't very academic. I was bored in the classroom. It never really excited me and it was never something I really wanted to do. I went to a good school – St Augustine's in Billington. "I didn't wag school or anything like that."

Growing up, Dunn wanted to be a footballer because of the influence from his grandfather, David, who was a footballer himself and was a Blackburn Rovers fan, along with his family. Growing up, he idolised Simon Garner. In addition to playing football, Dunn also played cricket.

== Club career ==
=== Blackburn Rovers ===
Dunn joined Blackburn Rovers as a trainee at the beginning of 1997 and quickly impressed the reserve team. His first goal for Blackburn Rovers' Reserves came on 3 February 1997. Dunn then played in both legs of the FA Youth Cup semi–finals, as Blackburn Rovers Academy lost 4–3 on aggregate. Nevertheless, he was part of the squad that saw Blackburn Rovers Youth win 3–0 against Everton Youth in a penalty shoot-out following a 1–1 draw after extra-time. However, in the final of the Lancashire FA Youth Cup, they lost 3–1 against Manchester United Youth. The following season, Dunn played in both legs of the FA Youth Cup, as they lost 5–3 on aggregate against Everton Youth.

The start of the 1998–99 season saw Dunn being called up to the first-team squad by manager Roy Hodgson. He made his debut during a goalless draw with Everton on 26 September 1998. Dunn came off the bench after 70 minutes but was taken off after just 11 minutes on the pitch, due to the sending off of Martin Dahlin. After making his debut, he said: "I am not a nervous person so it doesn't really bother me. I am just glad to be playing. It's exciting and a brilliant experience. I was just happy to go on no matter how long it was for. It was a surprise to come off but it had to be done for the team. The gaffer explained to me why he did it afterwards and I agree with him." In his second appearance, Blackburn beat Newcastle United at St James' Park in the League Cup; Dunn scored the winning penalty in the shoot-out. The end of the year saw Dunn being linked a move away from Blackburn Rovers, as Preston North End wanted to sign him on loan. But it was announced on 12 December that he signed a contract with the club, keeping him until 2003. His first goal came in a 3–1 victory against Aston Villa on 6 February. Throughout the 1998–99 season, he had received a handful of first-team appearances for the club. At the end of the 1998–99 season, Dunn made 16 appearances and scored one goal in all competitions.

Ahead of the 1999–2000 season, it was expected that Dunn was to fight for his first-team place in the central midfield position. He began the season when he appeared in a number of matches, either starting a match and coming on as a substitute, without able to play the whole game for the side. On 22 September, Dunn scored his first goal of the season, in a 3–1 win against Portsmouth in the second round of the League Cup. Dunn then spend the next two months playing for the reserve side, though he did return to the first-team once, coming against Leeds United in the third round of the League Cup. On 6 November, Dunn returned to the first-team, where he started a match and played 83 minutes before being substituted, in a 2–2 draw against Ipswich Town. Dunn started in the next two matches before he returned to the reserve side for a month until on 28 December 1999 against Portsmouth, starting the whole game, winning 2–1. Dunn then regained his first-team place for the rest of the 1999–2000 season. His lack of first-eam opportunities led him to a transfer request, only to be rejected by Blackburn Rovers. He later withdrew the transfer request a month later. Dunn then scored two goals in two matches between 18 March and 22 March against Fulham and Birmingham City. Despite suffering injuries during the 1999–2000 season, Dunn made twenty–six appearances and scored three times in all competitions.

At the start of the 2000–01 season, Dunn became a first-team regular, establishing himself in the starting eleven and playing midfield. On 26 August, he scored his first goal of the season, in a 3–2 win against Norwich City. This was followed up when Blackburn entertained Rochdale in the League Cup, where Dunn scored a hat-trick from the penalty spot. He then scored in the next two matches, against Nottingham Forest and Watford. Two weeks later on 26 September, Dunn scored his seventh goal of the season, in a 1–1 draw against Portsmouth. He reached double figures in terms of goals in 2000 after scoring five more goals, including a brace against Crystal Palace on 22 December. Along the way, Dunn was suspended on three occasions. After his performances attracted interests from top division clubs, Blackburn Rovers began open talks with him over a new contract. It was announced on 14 February that he signed a four-year contract extension, keeping him at the club until 2005. During the same month, Dunn added three more goals in February, including scoring against Bolton Wanderers in two separate matches. His performances throughout February earned him the Young Player of the Month award. He then scored three goals throughout April and then helped Blackburn achieve promotion back to the Premier League for the first time since 1999. At the end of the 2000–01 season, Dunn made fifty–two appearances and scored 18 times in all competitions (although he stated in his column on Lancashire Telegraph that he aimed to score twenty goals). For his performance, Dunn was named PFA Team of the Year.

Ahead of the 2001–02 season, Dunn was linked a move away from Blackburn Rovers, but the club's chairman John Williams refused to sell him. He started in the opening game of the season against Derby County but was substituted at half-time following a challenge, as Blackburn Rovers lost 2–1. Having previously sustained a knee while on international duty, Dunn was sidelined for six weeks. On 30 September, he returned to the starting line–up and played 81 minutes before being substituted, in a 2–1 loss against Aston Villa. Dunn starred in Rovers' return to the Premier League, putting in a string of impressive performances, notably in their 7–1 win over West Ham United and a 3–3 draw at Arsenal, where he scored two goals, one a last minute equaliser. Following these two matches, local newspaper The Lancashire Telegraph praised Dunn's performance. He later reflected on his performance on his column for the Lancashire Telegraph. Since returning from injury, Dunn continued his good form in the season and regained his place in the midfield position. He then scored two goals in two matches between 15 December and 22 December against Newcastle United and Charlton Athletic. Dunn was sidelined with a calf injury during a 2–1 loss against Manchester United on 19 January. After being sidelined for three weeks, he returned to the starting line–up and played the whole game, as Blackburn Rovers lost 2–0 against Fulham on 9 February. Dunn then started in the League Cup final against Tottenham Hotspur, as he helped the side win 2–1 to win the trophy at the Millennium Stadium. Dunn scored his sixth goal of the season, in a 3–0 win against Aston Villa on 5 March. A week later, however, he suffered a rib injury and was substituted in the 34th minute, as Blackburn Rovers lost 3–1 against Leeds United. Dunn did not return to the first-team until on 1 April against Southampton and played 53 minutes before being substituted, as they won 2–0. Following his return, he started in the last six league matches, including scoring his seventh goal of the season, in a 3–1 win against Middlesbrough on 20 April. At the end of the 2001–02 season, Dunn made thirty–four appearances and scored seven times in all competitions.

Ahead of the 2002–03 season, Dunn, once again, was linked a move away from Blackburn Rovers, as Premier League clubs continued to declare their interests in signing him. He started the season well, scoring two goals in two separate weeks against Liverpool and Chelsea. Both of these matches saw him earn praises from The Lancashire Telegraph. Since the start of the 2002–03 season, Dunn continued to regain his first-team place in the midfield position and was in good form. He then made his UEFA Cup debut against CSKA Sofia and played in both legs, as Blackburn Rovers went through away goal following a 4–4 draw on aggregate. After suffering a hamstring injury during a 2–1 loss against Tottenham Hotspur on 6 October, Dunn returned to the starting line–up and scored twice for the side, in a 5–2 win against Newcastle United on 19 October. However, loss of form combined with his injury concerns did not help his cause and he fell out with then-Blackburn manager Graeme Souness. It was speculated the previous January that the pair fell out. Although Dunn was hurt over the situation leading up to his departure, he later said he did not have a grudge against Souness. Dunn then scored two goals in two matches between 22 February and 1 March against Chelsea and Manchester City. Despite suffering injuries along the way, he continued to regain his first-team place and then added two more goals later in the 2003–04 season. At the end of the season, Dunn made thirty–five appearances and scored eight times in all competitions.

Subsequently, Dunn was ready to move on to another club in the summer. He even turned down a contract extension from Blackburn Rovers, further doubting his stay at the club. Blackburn initially rejected offers from a number of clubs, but Birmingham City's revised bid of £5.5 million was accepted, and Dunn moved to the West Midlands in time for the start of the 2003–04 season. Dunn later said that he regretted leaving Blackburn Rovers for Birmingham City. During his time in his first spell at Blackburn Rovers, Dunn was at one time dubbed "the New Gazza", a testament to his flair and technical ability.

=== Birmingham City ===
After signing a four-year contract, Dunn impressively made an impact in the club's friendly matches, scoring three times before suffering a muscle injury against Walsall, which he recovered from. Dunn's Birmingham City career started brightly with a debut goal in a 1–0 victory over Tottenham Hotspur on 16 August 2003. After the match, Manager Steve Bruce praised his performance, saying: "David Dunn proved he had some real, real quality with the spotlight on him and such a big crowd. He's rushed to get the ball (for the penalty). He's got something about him and he's a special player." Two weeks later on 30 August, Dunn scored his second goal of the season, in a 1–0 win against Newcastle United. During a 0–0 draw against local rivals, Aston Villa on 19 October, he attempted to do the Rabona pass, only for it to backfire. Dunn later spoke about his embarrassing incident on numerous occasions. Since the start of the 2003–04 season, he started in every match until a niggling hamstring sustained in February meant that Dunn spent much of the second half of his first season on the side-line. At the end of the 2003–04 season, Dunn made twenty–two appearances and scored two times in all competitions.

The beginning of his second season saw Dunn continuing to recover from his injury. It was not until on 18 September 2004 when he returned to the first-team, coming on as a 61st-minute substitute, in a 1–1 draw against Charlton Athletic. Dunn quickly re-established himself in the heart of the Birmingham midfield and chipped in some vital goals despite suffering from injury along the way. However, a recurrence of Dunn's hamstring problems in November limited him to just a handful of performances for the remainder of the season, and kept him out of the side until midway through the following season. At one point, he thought about retiring from football because of the injury. At the end of the 2004-05 season, Dunn made twenty–eight appearances and scored two times in all competitions.

The 2005–06 season saw Dunn continuing rehabilitating from his hamstring injury. It was not until on 16 October when he returned to the first-team, coming on as a 67th-minute substitute, in a 1–0 loss against rivals Aston Villa. However, Dunn's return was short–lived when he suffered a calf injury while training and was sidelined for a month. Ultimately, Birmingham were relegated from the Premier League, with Dunn still not returning to fitness. Amidst injuries, he went on to score three goals during the season, coming against Portsmouth, Reading and Wigan Athletic. At the end of the 2005–06 season, Dunn made 19 appearances and scoring three times in all competitions.

Ahead of the 2006–07 season, Dunn returned to training and spent the whole pre-season regaining his fitness. He made his first appearance of the season, starting the whole game, in a 2–1 win against Colchester United in the opening game of the season. Since the start of the 2006–07 season, Dunn quickly became a first-team regular, playing in the midfield position. He then scored his first goal of the season, in a 2–2 draw against Ipswich Town on 16 September 2006. However, Dunn was plagued with injuries throughout the first half of the season. Amid to injuries, he was linked with a return to Blackburn in the upcoming transfer window in November, as Bruce said his departure from Birmingham City could be imminent. By the time he left the club, Dunn made eleven appearances and scored once in all competitions.

=== Return to Blackburn Rovers ===
On 17 January 2007, Dunn returned to Blackburn Rovers for an undisclosed fee on a three-and-a-half-year deal believed to be £2.2 million. He rejected a move to Bolton Wanderers in favour of returning to his boyhood club. On 3 February, Dunn played his first Premier League match since his return to Blackburn Rovers against Sheffield United and earned a free kick which led to Rovers scoring a last-minute winner. After the match, he said: "It was good to be back out there again – it felt like I'd never been away. I was really touched by the reception I got from the fans – it was special for me." Dunn then played a role in the FA Cup fifth round replay against Arsenal when he set up a goal for Benni McCarthy to score the only goal of the game to advance to the next round. At the end of this campaign, despite injury problems, he managed to feature in a total of 16 games in all competitions, including appearing in 11 Premier League matches.

Dunn started the 2007–08 season well, scoring in a 1–1 draw against Arsenal. Manager Mark Hughes praised Dunn's performance after the match. Since the start of the 2007–08 season, Dunn's place in the midfield position proved to be resurrection of his football career. He then set up two goals in two matches between 7 October and 20 October against his former club Birmingham City and Reading. Dunn started in every match since the start of the 2007–08 season until he was sent off for a second bookable offence, in a 2–0 loss against Manchester United. After serving a one match suspension, Dunn returned to the starting line–up against Aston Villa on 28 November, where they lost 4–0. He then provided a hat–trick of assists, as Blackburn Rovers won 4–1 against Bolton Wanderers on 24 February. At one point during a 2–1 loss against West Ham United, he was involved in altercation with teammate Christopher Samba after conceding the equalising and the argument carried on in the dressing room at half-time. Despite being sidelined on four more occasions later in the 2007–08 season, Dunn made thirty–eight appearances and scored once in all competitions. For his performances, he won the Special Club Award at Blackburn Rovers' annual Player of the Year awards.

Ahead of the 2008–09 season, Dunn was appointed vice-captain by new manager Paul Ince for the new season. He started the season well, scoring in the opening game of the season, in a 3–2 win against Everton. However, his 200th league appearance for Blackburn Rovers against Hull City on 23 August was overshadowed when he suffered an Achilles injury and was substituted at half-time. It was announced that Dunn was out for four months. By November, Dunn made his return to training to maintain his fitness, as he continued to recover from his injury. It was not until on 12 December when Dunn returned from injury, coming on as a second-half substitute, in a 3–0 loss against Wigan Athletic. Since returning from injury, he found himself in and out of the starting line–up, as his season was disrupted by niggling injuries. At the end of the 2008–09 season, Dunn made 17 appearances and scored once in all competitions.

Ahead of the 2009–10 season, Dunn was linked to a move away from Blackburn Rovers, with Sunderland interested in signing him, but the move did not materialise. He was featured in the club's pre-season matches before suffering a thigh injury that saw him miss the start of the 2009–10 season. Despite missing the first two games of the 2009–10 season Dunn returned in the League Cup clash against Gillingham and scored on his return in a 3–1 win in the second round making Rovers progress to the third round of the tournament. He then hit top form for Rovers, scoring first goals in the Premier League including strikes against Wolverhampton Wanderers, Aston Villa, Arsenal, Bolton Wanderers and a memorable equaliser against local rivals Burnley at Ewood Park. Since returning from injury, Dunn regained his first-team place, playing in the midfield position for the next two months. However, Dunn was plagued with injuries that sidelined him for the next three months, though he did return around January. While sidelined, it was announced on 26 January, with Dunn's contract expiring at Rovers, he signed a new two-and-a-half-year contract to keep him with the club until at least July 2012. His contract talks started in August 2008 but it was delayed following his injuries.

On 21 February 2010, Dunn returned to the first-team, coming on as an 87th-minute substitute, in a 3–0 win. He made his 260th appearance for Blackburn Rovers in a home fixture with Chelsea at Ewood Park in a 1–1 draw on 21 March, playing for 56 minutes before being replaced by Australian international Brett Emerton. In a follow–up match, he scored twice against Birmingham City on 24 March in a 2–1 victory at Ewood Park, one in front of the Darwen End in the 5th-minute with him shooting with his left foot right in the corner of the goal and the other goal came on 67 minutes with a well-timed header from a corner taken by winger El Hadji Diouf from the left by line, and he celebrated in front of the Walkersteel Blackburn End with all the Rovers supporters, and received a yellow card for going into the crowd. Four days later on 28 March, Dunn scored the winning goal from the penalty spot against rivals Burnley at Turf Moor. Since returning from injury, he regained his first-team place for the rest of the 2009–10 season. Two months later on 3 May, Dunn scored his tenth goal of the season, in a 2–1 win against Arsenal. At the end of the 2009–10 season, he made twenty–four appearances and scored ten times in all competitions, making him the club's top scorer this season. His performance in the 2009–10 season earned him the most Man of the Matches awards.

At the start of the 2010–11 season, Dunn featured in two matches for the club. However, he suffered a thigh injury while playing for the club's reserves and was sidelined for a month. On 18 October, Dunn returned to the first-team from injury, coming on as a 64th-minute substitute, in a 0–0 draw against Sunderland. Since returning from injury, he was involved in the first-team for the next three months. On 4 December, Dunn scored his first goal of the 2010–11 season against Wolverhampton Wanderers with a close range header. On 2 February 2011, in the match against Tottenham Hotspur at Ewood Park, he made his 100th Premier League appearance since returning to the club for a second spell which ended in a disappointing 1–0 defeat. Three days later on 5 February, he came on for Brett Emerton in the 60th-minute with Rovers down 3–2 against Wigan Athletic at the DW Stadium, he netted a penalty kick in the 81st-minute but could not prevent them from losing 4–3. However, Dunn suffered a groin injury while training and was sidelined for the rest of March. On 2 April, he returned to the first-team, coming on as a late substitute, in a 0–0 draw against Arsenal. Dunn then started in the next three matches before suffering a calf injury during a match against Manchester City on 25 April. Following Blackburn Rovers' survival in the Premier League, he called on the players to improve in the league next season. At the end of the 2010–11 season, Dunn went on to make twenty–seven appearances and scored two times in all competitions.

At the start of the 2011–12 season, Dunn appeared in the club's first five matches of the season before suffering a hamstring injury and was substituted in the 34th-minute, in a 1–0 loss against Everton 27 August. He returned to the starting line–up against Fulham on 11 September but was substituted in the 52nd-minute after suffering a calf injury, in a 1–1 draw, resulting in him being sidelined for a month. While sidelined, Dunn defended Rovers manager Steve Kean from criticism. On 29 October, Dunn returned to the first-team, coming on as a 70th-minute substitute, in a 3–3 draw against Norwich City. Three weeks later on 19 November, Dunn was sent off for a second bookable offence, in a 3–3 draw against Wigan Athletic. After serving a one match suspension, he returned to the starting line–up, in a 2–0 loss against Cardiff City on 29 November 2011. On 14 January 2012, Dunn scored his first goal of the season, as well as, setting up the club's first goal of the game, in a 3–1 win against Fulham. 13 days later it was announced that he signed a contract extension with Blackburn Rovers, keeping him at the club until 2013. Two months later on 3 March, Dunn scored his second goal of the season, in a 1–1 draw against Aston Villa. Despite being sidelined on four more occasions later in the 2011–12 season, Dunn found himself in and out of the starting line–up, playing in the midfield position. At the end of the 2011–12 season, Dunn made 28 appearances and scored two times in all competitions, as they suffered relegation for the third time in his career as Rovers finished in 19th-place in the Premier League.

Ahead of the 2012–13 season, Dunn believed the club's main priority was to aim for promotion back to the Premier League. After being featured for the first two league matches of the season, Dunn then found himself placed on the substitute bench, as well as, his own injury concern. In a match against Sheffield Wednesday on 24 October, he started and set up the club's only goal of the game before suffering a calf injury in the 34th-minute and was substituted, as they won 1–0. Following this, it was announced that Dunn was out for two months with the injury. It was not until on 26 December when he returned from injury, coming on as a 79th-minute substitute, in a 1–0 loss against Middlesbrough. However, Dunn's return was short–lived when he was sidelined for two months, though Dunn did return to the firs-team against Derby County in the fourth round of the FA Cup. It was not until on 10 March when he returned from injury, coming on as a 48th-minute substitute, in a 0–0 draw against Millwall. During the Cotton Mill derby against Burnley on 17 March, Dunn scored a 95th-minute goal for Rovers which secured a draw. Ultimately, his goal was named Goal of the Season. He was featured in the next seven matches before sidelined with a gash injury for the rest of the 2012–13 season. At the end of the season, Dunn made 18 appearances and scored once in all competitions.

At the start of the new 2013–14 season, Dunn signed a new one-year deal to remain at Blackburn until summer 2014. He made his first appearance of the campaign, making a start as captain in the League Cup first round tie against Carlisle United at Brunton Park, in which Dunn had a tame first half penalty saved; Rovers lost 4–3 on penalties after extra-time. He found himself on the scoresheet in the local derby against Bolton Wanderers with an excellent solo effort, beating three players before slotting into the net to put Blackburn one goal up on the way to a 4–1 victory. However, Dunn suffered a knee injury that kept him out for a month. On 9 November, he returned to the first-team, coming on as a 63rd-minute substitute, in a 3–0 win against Brighton & Hove Albion. After missing one match due to "not fit enough to play two matches in four days", Dunn scored his second goal of the season, in a 3–2 win against Millwall on 14 December. This was followed up by setting up the club's only goal of the game, in a 1–0 win against Yeovil Town. However, he suffered a hamstring injury that kept him out for weeks.

On 11 January 2014, Dunn returned to the starting line–up, coming on as a 72nd-minute substitute, in a 1–0 win against Doncaster Rovers. He set up the club's second goal of the game, in a 2–2 draw against Barnsley two weeks later on 28 January. This was followed up by scoring his second goal of the season, in a 2–0 win against Blackpool. A month later on 25 March, Dunn scored his fourth goal of the season, as well as, setting up the club's third goal of the game, in a 3–3 draw against Watford. Despite being sidelined later in the 2013–14 season, he continued to be involved in the first-team. For his performance, Dunn was awarded the club's Man of the Year. At the end of the 2013–14 season, he made twenty–four appearances and scored four times in all competitions. Dunn was released by Blackburn following the end of his contract on 1 July 2014, but re-signed for the club on 11 July of the same year.

At the start of the 2014–15 season, Dunn made his first appearance of the season, where he started and played 62 minutes before being substituted in a 1–0 loss against Scunthorpe United in the first round of the League Cup. However, Dunn suffered a minor knock that eventually kept him out for the month. On 21 October, he returned to the first-team, coming on as a 66th-minute substitute, in a 1–0 win against Birmingham City. However, Dunn found his first-team opportunities limited throughout the 2014–15 season. On 27 April, Dunn announced he would be departing Blackburn Rovers at the end of the season, ending his combined time of 13 years. Dunn made his 387th appearance for the club, where he started and played 76 minutes before substituted, which he received a standing ovation from supporters, as Blackburn Rovers won 3–2 against Ipswich Town in the last game of the season. At the end of the 2014–15 season, Dunn made twelve appearances in all competitions.

=== Oldham Athletic ===
On 30 July 2015, Dunn signed for League One club Oldham Athletic on a one-year deal. Manager Darren Kelly stated that his addition would make the team's midfield one of the strongest in the league for the upcoming 2015–16 Oldham Athletic A.F.C. season. Upon joining the club, he was given a number 17 shirt. Dunn made his Oldham Athletic debut, coming on as a 67th-minute substitute, in a 1–1 draw against Walsall in the opening game of the season. Since making his debut for the club, he was involved in every match, and contributed two assists. By the time Dunn was appointed manager, he made nine appearances in all competitions.

== International career ==
Dunn represented England at international level and was first called up to the England U18 squad for the first time and made his debut for the U18 squad on 12 February 1998. He was then a part of their squad for the 1998 UEFA European Championship in Cyprus, where they were eliminated in the Group Stage.

In November 1998, Dunn was called up to the Under-21 squad for the first time. He made his debut on 18 November 1998. In May 2000, Dunn was called up to the UEFA European Under-21 Championship in Slovakia. He played two times in the tournament, as England were eliminated in the Group Stage. It was not until on 31 August 2000 that Dunn scored his first goal for England U21, in a 6–1 win against Georgia U21. Two months later, he was appointed as captain for a 1–1 draw against Germany. Dunn was called up for the UEFA European Under-21 Championship and played three times, as they finished last in their group.

Throughout 2001, there were calls from the British media that Dunn should be called up to the England squad. On his column for the Lancashire Telegraph, he wrote positively about Sven-Göran Eriksson's early managerial start at England. Dunn was considered to be in the England squad for the FIFA World Cup, but he did not make the final cut. Three months later, on 3 September 2002, Dunn was called up to the England for the first time and made his first cap on 7 September 2002, when he replaced Steven Gerrard against Portugal at half-time. This turned out to be his only senior England appearance. Following this, there were calls for England to call Dunn to the squad, but to no avail, as he said: "I know that I should've had more caps. I truly wish that I'd knuckled down at times and pushed myself that bit more. I'm really proud that I played professionally for my country, it's what I started out wanting to do but there's always that little bugbear that I could and maybe should've had more caps."

== Coaching career ==
=== Oldham Athletic ===
On 13 September 2015, following the sacking of Darren Kelly, Dunn was appointed as the caretaker manager of his playing club Oldham Athletic, with him supposed to remain in that position until a permanent replacement was found. At the time of his appointment, he was working on completing his UEFA Pro Licence, having previously completed his UEFA A and B Licences. On 7 October, Dunn was appointed permanently, following a recent unbeaten run. His first game in charge as their permanent manager came three days later in a 4–2 defeat to Scunthorpe United at Boundary Park. His first victory was a 2–1 victory at Swindon Town on 20 October 2015.

His tenure as manager did not go according to plan: Oldham entered into a relegation battle after a negative run of results which resulted in Dunn being dismissed on 12 January 2016, just three months after his appointment. Oldham had gone several league games without a win. Dunn's departure also led to the exits of Dean Holden and Keith Brown, who were both members of Dunn's coaching staff. He left the club sat in twenty-second place, with Dunn being replaced by heavily experienced John Sheridan a day later.

On 25 February 2016, Dunn returned to his former playing club Blackburn Rovers to work alongside his former teammate Damien Johnson in the academy set-up as the under-23s assistant coach. His appointment as coach saw Dunn hang up his boots after an 18-year-spell as a professional footballer. On 22 February 2017, Dunn was promoted to first-team coach under new manager Tony Mowbray. Dunn remained in that role until the end of the season; he reverted to his previous position after Blackburn were relegated to League One. A successful season followed for Blackburn: the under-23s (which Dunn coached with Johnson) won the Premier League 2 Division 2, earning promotion to Division 1; whereas the first-team achieved immediate promotion back to the Championship as runners-up. Dunn departed Blackburn for the third time in June 2018, in order to concentrate on his family and other business interests outside of football.

=== Blackpool ===
In January 2020, Dunn joined League One side Blackpool as an assistant coach. On 12 February, Dunn was installed as the club's caretaker manager until further notice, following the dismissal of Simon Grayson, who was sacked after a negative run of form. His first game in charge was 2–1 defeat in the league, away at Bristol Rovers, taking place three days following his appointment. However, Blackpool went on to record a respectable run of form, including a goalless draw against AFC Wimbledon, before achieving 2–1 victories whilst hosting Bolton Wanderers and promotion-chasing Ipswich Town at Bloomfield Road, respectively.

Neil Critchley, a highly acclaimed coach who had previously been employed by Premier League giants Liverpool as their under-23s team manager, was appointed as Grayson's replacement on 2 March. Following his appointment, Critchley stated that he was satisfied with the existing coaching staff, with Dunn confirming two days later that he intended to remain in his previous role as an assistant coach, with all four members of the coaching staff being on the touchline for the club's reserves fixture against Huddersfield Town one day previously.

=== Barrow ===
In July 2020, Dunn became linked with the vacant managerial position at Barrow, whose previous manager Ian Evatt had recently departed to join Bolton Wanderers just shortly after guiding the club to promotion into the English Football League. On 9 July, his appointment at the club was confirmed, after he signed a two-year contract. This became Dunn's first permanent managerial position since his tenure at Oldham Athletic concluded in 2016. After 22 matches, the last nine without a win, and with the team 21st in the table, Dunn was sacked on 13 December 2020.

=== Port Vale ===
In July 2022, he joined Port Vale as a first-team coach. He left the club following the sacking of Andy Crosby in February 2024.

== Personal life ==
Dunn was in a relationship with actress Sammy Winward; the couple were once engaged and had a daughter named Mia. Dunn has three children with his wife, Hayley. The oldest, Isaac, was born in 2008.

During his first spell at Blackburn Rovers, Dunn wrote a column for the Lancashire Telegraph, and was known as a prankster. He later went onto business with former teammate Garry Flitcroft, running a timber firm named Flitcraft.

== Career statistics ==
=== Club ===
Appearances and goals by club, season and competition
Club	Season	League			FA Cup		League Cup		Other		Total	
Club	Season	Division	Apps	Goals	Apps	Goals	Apps	Goals	Apps	Goals	Apps	Goals
Blackburn Rovers	1998–99	Premier League	15	1	3	0	2	0	0	0	19	1
Blackburn Rovers	1999–2000	First Division	22	2	1	0	3	1	—		26	3
Blackburn Rovers	2000–01	First Division	42	12	5	2	5	4	—		52	18
Blackburn Rovers	2001–02	Premier League	29	7	2	1	5	0	—		36	8
Blackburn Rovers	2002–03	Premier League	28	8	2	0	2	0	4 (Note: Appearances in UEFA Cup)	0	36	8
Blackburn Rovers	Total		136	30	13	3	17	5	4	0	170	38
Birmingham City	2003–04	Premier League	21	2	3	0	1	0	—		25	2
Birmingham City	2004–05	Premier League	11	2	0	0	1	0	—		12	2
Birmingham City	2005–06	Premier League	15	2	3	1	2	0	—		20	3
Birmingham City	2006–07	Championship	11	1	—		1	0	—		12	1
Birmingham City	Total		58	7	6	1	5	0	—		69	8
Blackburn Rovers	2006–07	Premier League	11	0	3	0	—		2	0	16	0
Blackburn Rovers	2007–08	Premier League	31	1	0	0	3	0	4 (Note: One appearance in UEFA Intertoto Cup, three in UEFA Cup)	0	38	1
Blackburn Rovers	2008–09	Premier League	15	1	2	0	0	0	—		17	1
Blackburn Rovers	2009–10	Premier League	23	9	1	0	4	1	—		28	10
Blackburn Rovers	2010–11	Premier League	27	2	0	0	0	0	—		27	2
Blackburn Rovers	2011–12	Premier League	26	2	0	0	2	0	—		28	1
Blackburn Rovers	2012–13	Championship	15	1	3	0	0	0	—		18	1
Blackburn Rovers	2013–14	Championship	23	4	0	0	1	0	—		24	4
Blackburn Rovers	2014–15	Championship	9	0	2	0	1	0	—		12	0
Blackburn Rovers	Total		180	20	11	0	11	1	6	0	208	21
Oldham Athletic	2015–16	League One	8	0	0	0	1	0	0	0	9	0
Career total			382	57	30	4	34	6	10	0	456	67

=== International ===
Appearances and goals by national team and year
National team	Year	Apps	Goals
England	2002	1	0
Total		1	0

=== Managerial ===
As of 13 December 2020

Managerial record by team and tenure
Team	From	To	Record				
Team	From	To	G	W	D	L	Win %
Oldham Athletic	13 September 2015	12 January 2016	20	3	9	8	15.00
Blackpool (caretaker)	14 February 2020	2 March 2020	4	2	1	1	50.00
Barrow	9 July 2020	13 December 2020	22	2	11	9	9.09
Total			46	7	21	18	15.22

== Honours ==
Blackburn Rovers

- FA Youth Cup runner-up: 1998
- Football League First Division second-place promotion: 2000–01
- Football League Cup: 2001–02

Birmingham City

- Football League Championship second-place promotion: 2006–07

Individual

- BBC North West's Annual Sports Awards: 2001
- PFA Team of the Year: 2000–01 First Division
