= Jeff Kenna =

Irish footballer and manager (born 1970)

Personal information
- Full name: Jeffrey Jude Kenna
- Date of birth: 27 August 1970 (age 56)
- Place of birth: Dublin, Ireland
- Height: 5 ft 11 in (1.80 m)
- Position: Right back

Youth career
- 1987–1989: Southampton

Senior career*
Years	Team	Apps	(Gls)
1989–1995	Southampton	114	(4)
1995–2002	Blackburn Rovers	156	(1)
2001	→ Tranmere Rovers (loan)	11	(0)
2001	→ Wigan Athletic (loan)	6	(1)
2001–2002	→ Birmingham City (loan)	6	(0)
2002–2004	Birmingham City	69	(3)
2004–2006	Derby County	65	(0)
2006–2008	Kidderminster Harriers	57	(1)
2008	Galway United	6	(0)
2009	St Patrick's Athletic	0	(0)
Total		490	(10)

International career
1995–1999	Republic of Ireland	27	(0)

Managerial career
- 2008–2009: Galway United
- 2009: St Patrick's Athletic
- * Club domestic league appearances and goals

Jeffrey Jude Kenna (born 27 August 1970) is an Irish football manager and former professional footballer.

Kenna played as a defender from 1989 until 2009, notably in the Premier League for Southampton, Blackburn Rovers and Birmingham City. He was part of the Rovers side that won the title in 1995 following his mid-season transfer from the Saints. He also played in the Football League for Tranmere Rovers, Wigan Athletic and Derby County, finishing his career in England with Non-league side Kidderminster Harriers. He was capped 27 times by Republic of Ireland.

Following retirement he went on to manage Galway United and St Patrick's Athletic. In 2011, he joined the coaching staff of the IMG Academy in Bradenton, Florida.

== Playing career ==
Kenna was born in Dublin, but began his club career in England, with Southampton in 1988. He made his debut on 4 May 1991 in a 6–2 league defeat by Derby County at the Baseball Ground. He became a first team regular in the 1992–93 season and remained a fixture in the first team until 15 March 1995, when he moved to Blackburn Rovers for a fee of £1.5 million, playing a part in the run-in to the club's Premier League title that year.

He had played 114 league matches for the Saints, scoring four goals.

He was a regular in the Blackburn team until the 1999–2000 season, after Blackburn had been relegated to Division One. He made his final six appearances for Rovers in the 2000–01 season. During that campaign he had loan spells with Tranmere Rovers and Wigan Athletic, before finally exiting Ewood Park after nearly seven years to join Birmingham City on a free transfer on 24 December 2001.

Kenna scored three goals for Birmingham City after their promotion to the Premier League as Division One playoff winners at the end of the 2001–02 season – their first top division campaign in nearly 20 years.

He joined Derby County on a free transfer in March 2004, and was appointed club captain 2005, but was released at the end of the season in May 2006. In August 2006 he sealed a move to Kidderminster Harriers in the Conference National. Along with Steve Guppy, he became the first player to play at both Wembley stadiums, having played twice at the old ground, when he played for Kidderminster in their defeat to Stevenage in the FA Trophy Final 2007.

== Coaching career ==
Kenna was named Galway United manager (taking over from his former Republic of Ireland U21 international team-mate Tony Cousins) in a press conference on 21 April 2008. He lost his first match in charge 3–2 versus Bray Wanderers.

At the time taking over at United, the club were bottom of the table and haemorrhaging money. Due to league financial regulations a lot of the senior players were sold onto other clubs to ensure that the clubs salary expenditure fell within league requirements. On 15 July 2008, Kenna officially (albeit somewhat reluctantly) became player-manager at Galway United.

Galway United relied on a number of young and relatively inexperienced players during the season. However, as the campaign progressed, Kenna was credited with helping foster a strong team ethic, and the club recorded five wins, one draw and one defeat in its final seven league matches. This run earned Galway 17 points, allowing the club to narrowly avoid relegation to the First Division by finishing one point ahead of Finn Harps. In addition to ensuring the club's survival, Kenna guided Galway United to the semi finals of both the League Cup and the FAI Cup. Although he was understood to be under contract for a further season with Galway, he resigned during the winter period.

He took the position of St. Patricks' Athletic manager on 15 January 2009. His first competitive match was a 3–0 home defeat at the hands of his previous club whose new manager, Ian Foster, had been Kenna's assistant the season before. Indifferent league form (which included two more defeats at the hands of Galway) saw Kenna come under pressure from the St. Pat's fans quite quickly, but a run to the Fourth Qualifying Round of the Europa League (which included a victory over Russian side Krylia Sovetov) appeared to have weathered the storm.

However, a 2–0 loss at home to First Division Waterford United in the quarter final of the FAI Cup ultimately led to Kenna's resignation as St. Patrick's Athletic manager on 18 September 2009.

On 1 August 2011, Kenna joined the coaching staff at the IMG Academy in Bradenton, Florida.

== Personal life ==
Kenna is the brother of heavyweight boxer Colin Kenna and second cousin of football manager Pat Scully. His father Liam is an Irish former snooker international.

== Career statistics ==
=== Club ===
Appearances and goals by club, season and competition
Club	Season	League			FA Cup		League Cup		Other		Total	
Club	Season	Division	Apps	Goals	Apps	Goals	Apps	Goals	Apps	Goals	Apps	Goals
Southampton
Southampton	1990–91	First Division	2	0	0	0	0	0	—		2	0
Southampton	1991–92	First Division	14	0	4	0	0	0	3 (Note: Appearances in Full Members' Cup)	0	21	0
Southampton	1992–93	Premier League	29	2	1	0	0	0	—		30	2
Southampton	1993–94	Premier League	41	2	1	0	1	0	—		43	2
Southampton	1994–95	Premier League	28	0	5	0	2	0	—		35	0
Southampton	Total		114	4	11	0	3	0	3	0	131	4
Blackburn Rovers
Blackburn Rovers	1994–95	Premier League	9	1	0	0	0	0	—		9	1
Blackburn Rovers	1995–96	Premier League	32	0	2	0	4	0	6 (Note: Appearances in UEFA Champions League and Charity Shield)	0	44	0
Blackburn Rovers	1996–97	Premier League	37	0	2	0	3	0	—		42	0
Blackburn Rovers	1997–98	Premier League	37	0	4	0	1	0	—		42	0
Blackburn Rovers	1998–99	Premier League	23	0	3	0	3	0	1 (Note: Appearances in UEFA Europa League)	0	30	0
Blackburn Rovers	1999–2000	First Division	11	0	2	0	3	0	—		16	0
Blackburn Rovers	2000–01	First Division	7	0	0	0	4	0	—		11	0
Blackburn Rovers	2001–02	Premier League	0	0	0	0	1	0	—		1	0
Blackburn Rovers	Total		156	1	13	0	19	0	7	0	195	1
Tranmere Rovers (loan)	2000–01	First Division	11	0	0	0	0	0	—		11	0
Wigan Athletic (loan)	2001–02	Second Division	6	1	1	0	0	0	—		7	1
Birmingham City (loan)	2001–02	First Division	6	0	0	0	0	0	—		6	0
Birmingham City
Birmingham City	2001–02	First Division	15	0	0	0	0	0	3 (Note: Appearances in 2002 play-offs)	0	18	0
Birmingham City	2002–03	Premier League	37	1	1	0	1	0	—		39	1
Birmingham City	2003–04	Premier League	17	2	4	0	0	0	—		21	2
Birmingham City	Total		75	3	5	0	1	0	3	0	84	3
Derby County
Derby County	2003–04	First Division	9	0	0	0	0	0	—		9	0
Derby County	2004–05	Championship	40	0	2	0	1	0	2 (Note: Appearances in 2005 play-offs)	0	45	0
Derby County	2005–06	Championship	16	0	1	0	1	0	—		18	0
Derby County	Total		65	0	3	0	2	0	2	0	72	0
Kidderminster Harriers
Kidderminster Harriers	2006–07	Conference National	29	1	1	0	—		5 (Note: Appearances in FA Trophy)	0	35	1
Kidderminster Harriers	2007–08	Conference National	28	0	0	0	—		1 (Note: Appearances in Conference League Cup)	0	29	0
Kidderminster Harriers	Total		57	1	1	0	0	0	6	0	64	1
Galway United	2008	Irish Premier Division	6	0	2 (Note: Appearances in FAI Cup)	0	1 (Note: Appearances in League of Ireland Cup)	0	—		9	0
Career total			490	10	36	0	26	0	21	0	573	10

=== International ===
Appearances and goals by national team and year
National team	Year	Apps	Goals
Republic of Ireland U21	1989	3	0
Republic of Ireland U21	1990	1	0
Republic of Ireland U21	1991	4	0
Total		8	0
Republic of Ireland B	1994	1	0
Total		1	0
Republic of Ireland	1995	6	0
Republic of Ireland	1996	9	0
Republic of Ireland	1997	7	0
Republic of Ireland	1998	4	0
Republic of Ireland	1999	1	0
Total		27	0

=== Managerial ===
Managerial record by team and tenure
Team	From	To	Record							
Team	From	To	G	W	D	L	GF	GA	GD	Win %
Galway United	21 April 2008	14 January 2009	34	13	8	13	44	41	+3	38.24
St Patrick's Athletic	14 January 2009	18 September 2009	38	13	5	20	29	49	−20	34.21

== Honours ==
Southampton

- Full Members' Cup runner-up: 1991–92

Blackburn Rovers

- Premier League: 1994–95

Birmingham City

- Football League First Division play-offs: 2002
