= 2003–04 Birmingham City F.C. season =

Birmingham City F.C.
2003–04 season
- Chairman: David Gold
- Manager: Steve Bruce
- Ground: St Andrew's
- Premier League: 10th
- FA Cup: Fifth round
- League Cup: Second round
- Top goalscorer: League: Mikael Forssell (17); All: Mikael Forssell (19)
- Highest home attendance: 29,588 vs Arsenal, 22 November 2003
- Lowest home attendance: 18,688 vs Blackburn Rovers, FA Cup 3rd round, 3 January 2004
- Average home league attendance: 29,073

The 2003–04 season was Birmingham City Football Club's 101st season in the English football league system, their second season in the Premier League, and their 52nd season in the top tier of English football. They finished 10th in the 20-team league, three places higher than the previous season. They entered the FA Cup at the third round stage and lost to Sunderland in the fifth after a replay, and lost their opening second-round League Cup-tie to Blackpool. Top scorer was loan signing Mikael Forssell with 19 goals, 17 of which were scored in the league.

== Pre-season ==
=== Pre-season friendlies ===
Date	Opponents	Venue	Result	Score F–A	Scorers	Attendance	Ref
19 July 2003	Burton Albion	A	W	4–0	John (2) 3', 56', Dunn (2) 18', 30' (pen)	1,952	
24 July 2003	Newcastle United	N	L	1–2	Devlin 72' (pen)	14,600	(Note: Matches were played as part of the 2003 FA Premier League Asia Cup tournament in Kuala Lumpur, Malaysia.)
26 July 2003	Malaysia XI	N	W	4–0	John (2) 8', 50', Clemence 76', Hughes 82'	12,000	
30 July 2003	Port Vale	A	L	0–2			
2 August 2003	Burnley	A	D	2–2	Horsfield 10', Dunn 26'		
5 August 2003	Walsall	A	W	3–1	John 30', Dugarry 50', Carter 80'	7,451	
9 August 2003	Real Mallorca	H	D	0–0		19,148	

== Premier League ==
=== Season review ===
Having avoided relegation in their first season in the Premier League with seven wins from the last eleven games, Birmingham were expected to struggle. They were unbeaten in the league at the end of September, and went into November still in fourth place. During a poor spell in the middle of the season Steve Bruce's side fell as low as tenth, though they rallied again and stood one point off fourth place with eight matches to go. In contrast to the previous season, just one win from the last eleven games gave Birmingham a tenth-place finish, six points behind city rivals Aston Villa, who had been struggling against relegation at the turn of the year.

==== August–September ====
In Birmingham's first game of the season, they beat Tottenham Hotspur 1–0 at St Andrew's, courtesy of a debut goal by record signing David Dunn, who converted a penalty awarded for Anthony Gardner's foul on Robbie Savage. Tottenham's manager, Glenn Hoddle, said afterwards that Rob Styles should not have been appointed as referee because he had sent off Birmingham's Kenny Cunningham in pre-season and "it's human nature to balance things up." Steve Bruce's side shared what PA Sport's reporter dubbed "a thrilling 0-0" at Southampton the following weekend. Both sides had chances to win the match as James Beattie struck the post and Stern John saw a shot cleared off the line. Birmingham then overcame Newcastle United 1–0 at St James' Park: after Gary Speed brought down Damien Johnson in the penalty area, Dunn's penalty was saved, but he scored from the rebound to give Birmingham a second league win in three games. In the first minute of the match, referee Matt Messias accidentally struck Savage in the face as he signalled a free kick. Their second league win in three games saw Birmingham climb to sixth in the table as they entered September.

Birmingham signed Finland international striker Mikael Forssell on a season-long loan from Chelsea before the transfer window shut. He scored twice on debut in a 2–2 draw with Fulham at St Andrew's, equalising just before half-time after Louis Saha gave the visitors an early lead and then again tying the scores after 82 minutes. Both sides finished with ten men: Sylvain Legwinski received a second yellow card for tripping Dunn and Darren Purse was sent off for "aiming a punch at" Luis Boa Morte after he scored Fulham's second goal. At Elland Road, Leeds United had the upper hand until Roque Júnior fouled Forssell and was sent off. Paul Robinson saved Dunn's penalty but the assistant referee saw an infringement. Savage's retake was successful and Forssell made the score 2–0. A 2–0 win at home to Portsmouth on 27 September with goals from Stephen Clemence and Stan Lazaridis gave Birmingham their best ever start to a league season and moved them fourth in the table.

==== October–December ====
Manchester United inflicted Birmingham's first league defeat of the season, winning 3–0 at Old Trafford after goalkeeper Maik Taylor was sent off by Mike Dean for fouling Paul Scholes. A goalless draw was enough to take normally free-scoring Chelsea top of the league and Birmingham fourth. Having lost both Second City derbies in 2002–03, Aston Villa held out for a goalless draw at St Andrew's "in a game high on energy but desperately low on quality". A fine save by Taylor from Bolton Wanderers' Kevin Davies helped Birmingham keep another clean sheet and a well-worked goal by Forssell gave them a fifth win of the season. Faced with criticism of his team's style of play, Bruce was pragmatic: "I wanted to assemble a team that was difficult to beat. If I'd gone down the other route and brought in six flair players we’d have ended up bottom of the League."

Having conceded only five league goals in the first three months of the season, Birmingham's defence was unusually fragile against Charlton Athletic. Matt Holland's two goals and Dean Kiely's multiple saves helped them become the first team for nine months to win at St Andrew's. Christophe Dugarry's powerfully headed goal was his first of the season and the last of his Birmingham career. Forssell scored just after half-time in a 1–1 draw at home to local rivals Wolverhampton Wanderers, before Birmingham lost 3–0 at home to Arsenal. They had the better of the first half against Liverpool at Anfield, but two spectacular second-half goals gave the hosts a 3–1 victory that left Birmingham in eighth place.

Four goals in the last half hour gave Blackburn Rovers an emphatic win at Birmingham. Dugarry, who had earlier missed from a yard out and whose foul in the build-up caused Forssell's goal to be disallowed, was sent off on 72 minutes after receiving two yellow cards. He was later charged with misconduct by the Football Association over an incident missed by the referee in which Craig Short's nose was broken, and banned for three matches. In Dugarry's absence with a knee injury, Clinton Morrison made his first league start for eight months and scored the opening goal in a match in which two opponents were sent off: Leicester City's captain, Matt Elliott, for an arm in Dunn's face in the first half and their goalkeeper, Ian Walker, after an hour for handling the ball a long way outside his penalty area. Forssell's header completed a 2–0 win, and Maik Taylor ended the match with a black eye and three stitches. Manchester City took an early lead at St Andrew's on Boxing Day, and despite pressure from Birmingham it took two fortunate goals in the last ten minutes – Jeff Kenna headed home the rebound after Savage's free kick struck the goalpost, and Richard Dunne's attempted clearance bounced in off Forssell – to secure the three points. Against Everton at Goodison Park, when Taylor was "jostled" by both Duncan Ferguson and Alan Stubbs, no foul was given, and Wayne Rooney scored the only goal of the match; the defeat left Birmingham ninth in the table.

==== January–February ====
With a defence disrupted by injury – midfielder Darren Carter, making his first start of the season, was one of three players used at left back in the first 40 minutes – Birmingham conceded three times to Tottenham Hotspur in the first half. Savage's penalty reduced the deficit, but Morrison missed a chance when through on goal, and the match ended 4–1. A goal apiece after 16 minutes, Antti Niemi's goalkeeping kept Southampton in the game, but Kenna scored the winner after an exchange of passes with Morrison; it was his second goal in two weeks and third in 8 1/2 years. Moments later, Kenna was having his head stitched after a challenge for which David Prutton was sent off. At Stamford Bridge, PA Sport's reporter highlighted Birmingham's incredible tenacity, Savage and Clemence "excelling in central midfield as they outplayed, let alone outfought, their far more illustrious opponents" to record another goalless draw with Chelsea, helped by Olivier Tebily's acrobatic clearance off the line after a rare error by Maik Taylor. After Newcastle United took a first-half lead at St Andrew's, Birmingham dominated without success. They were awarded a free kick in the second minute of stoppage time, which was moved forward 10 yards after a Newcastle player kicked the ball away. Cunningham took the free kick, and Stern John slid in to score.

Taylor made several fine saves, including a "superlative double reflex save from first Macken and then Sibierski", in a goalless draw with Manchester City at the City of Manchester Stadium. Johnson had and missed a late chance to win the match for Birmingham, which even Bruce thought would have been a injustice. Three days later Birmingham comfortably beat Everton with goals by Johnson, Forssell and Stan Lazaridis: "after collecting a pass from Savage in his own half, the Australian embarked on a speedy, purposeful and unchecked 40-yard (37 m) run before unleashing a fierce cross-shot into the roof of the net" that earned him the club's Goal of the Season award. Birmingham came back from 2–0 down at Villa Park to draw the Second City derby; the equaliser came in the fourth minute of stoppage time when Morrison's shot was parried and Stern John "thrashed the loose ball into the roof of the net". It was Christophe Dugarry's final appearance before his contract was cancelled by mutual consent.

==== March–May ====
Home wins against Middlesbrough, League Cup winners just three days before, in which recent signing Martin Taylor scored his first goal when Forssell's shot struck his shoulder, and League Cup losers Bolton Wanderers, in which Bryan Hughes's first goal of the season and Forssell's fourth in four games took Birmingham fifth in the table. Leicester City prepared for their visit to Birmingham with a "bonding" break in Spain during which nine players were arrested, three of whom were jailed; thanks to Les Ferdinand's goal and their hosts' poor finishing, they put an end to Birmingham's eight-match unbeaten run. The away match with Middlesbrough, played in a howling gale, was described by the Independent as "an eight-goal thriller in which a keeper (Middlesbrough's Mark Schwarzer) was the star and managed to keep the scoring within reasonable bounds" and by the Guardian as "a snatch of comic relief, a red-face day out of the blue"; Birmingham lost 5–3, and the last goal was scored by Szilard Nemeth after Matthew Upson tried to head the ball back to his goalkeeper but could not reach it until he was almost flat on the floor. Birmingham conceded early at home to Leeds United but had a 3–1 lead when a penalty was awarded. Although Forssell was the designated penalty-taker, Hughes had two goals already and wanted to complete his hat-trick; Bruce intervened in favour of Forssell, who duly scored his 18th goal of the season.

Two weeks after Maik Taylor's loan from Fulham was made permanent, his goalkeeping was instrumental in Birmingham's goalless draw with his former club; the result left them in sixth place. Martin Grainger, who had replaced the injured Lazaridis after 14 minutes, opened the scoring against Manchester United after 39 with a free kick. He was himself substituted at half-time because of a patellar tendon torn before he took the free kick, and he never played again. Cristiano Ronaldo and Louis Saha gave United a 2–1 win. Just before half-time at Portsmouth, Yakubu Aiyegbeni gave the hosts the lead. Referee Barry Knight disallowed the goal, sent off Maik Taylor for handling the ball outside his area, and awarded a free kick, from which Dejan Stefanović scored. Portsmouth doubled their lead, and then Stern John made the score 2–1. Knight then awarded a penalty, converted by Yakubu, and disallowed John's second for offside – harshly, according to BBC Sport. Morrison gave Birmingham the lead at Charlton, who promptly equalised; Hughes miskicked in front of an open goal in stoppage time. Away to Wolverhampton Wanderers, Forssell scored his 19th and last goal of the season and played a through ball from which Morrison gave Birmingham a 2–1 lead, but Taylor parried the ball to Carl Cort's feet for the equaliser.

Without Maik Taylor and Forssell, Birmingham secured a goalless draw away to a strong Arsenal side already confirmed as league champions. Had Morrison not failed to control Lazaridis' second-half cross, their unbeaten record might well have been broken. In their last home game of the season, Birmingham lost 3–0 to Liverpool; Emile Heskey, who made the assist for Michael Owen's goal and scored the second, signed for Birmingham ten days later. With Cunningham suspended, Savage captained the team for the visit to Blackburn Rovers; Stern John's late equaliser secured a 1–1 draw away and a tenth-place finish, six points short of European qualification.

=== Match details ===
Premier League match details
Date	League position	Opponents	Venue	Result	Score F–A	Scorers	Attendance	Ref(s)
16 August 2003	6th	Tottenham Hotspur	H	W	1–0	Dunn 36' pen.	29,358	
23 August 2003	6th	Southampton	A	D	0–0		31,656	
30 August 2003	6th	Newcastle United	A	W	1–0	Dunn 61'	52,006	
14 September 2003	8th	Fulham	H	D	2–2	Forssell (2) 45', 82'	27,250	
20 September 2003	7th	Leeds United	A	W	2–0	Savage 79' pen., Forssell 84'	34,305	
27 September 2003	4th	Portsmouth	H	W	2–0	Clemence 21', Lazaridis 50'	29,057	
4 October 2003	5th	Manchester United	A	L	0–3		67,633	
14 October 2003	4th	Chelsea	H	D	0–0		29,460	
19 October 2003	4th	Aston Villa	H	D	0–0		29,546	
25 October 2003	4th	Bolton Wanderers	A	W	1–0	Forssell 31'	25,023	
3 November 2003	4th	Charlton Athletic	H	L	1–2	Dugarry 64'	27,225	
8 November 2003	5th	Wolverhampton Wanderers	A	D	1–1	Forssell 49'	28,831	
22 November 2003	5th	Arsenal	H	L	0–3		29,588	
30 November 2003	8th	Liverpool	A	L	1–3	Forssell 33'	42,683	
6 December 2003	8th	Blackburn Rovers	H	L	0–4		29,354	
13 December 2003	8th	Leicester City	A	W	2–0	Morrison 42', Forssell 66'	30,639	
26 December 2003	8th	Manchester City	H	W	2–1	Kenna 81', Forssell 87'	29,520	
28 December 2003	9th	Everton	A	L	0–1		39,631	
7 January 2004	10th	Tottenham Hotspur	A	L	1–4	Savage 68' pen.	30,016	
10 January 2004	8th	Southampton	H	W	2–1	Clemence 16', Kenna 67'	29,071	
18 January 2004	9th	Chelsea	A	D	0–0		41,073	
31 January 2004	9th	Newcastle United	H	D	1–1	John 90'	29,513	
8 February 2004	10th	Manchester City	A	D	0–0		46,967	
11 February 2004	9th	Everton	H	W	3–0	Johnson 8', Lazaridis 39', Forssell 49'	29,004	
22 February 2004	8th	Aston Villa	A	D	2–2	Forssell 60', John 90'	40,061	
3 March 2004	7th	Middlesbrough	H	W	3–1	Martin Taylor 23', Savage 57', Forssell 79'	29,369	
6 March 2004	5th	Bolton Wanderers	H	W	2–0	Forssell 24', Hughes 69'	28,003	
13 March 2004	6th	Leicester City	H	L	0–1		29,491	
20 March 2004	7th	Middlesbrough	A	L	3–5	Forssell (2) 23', 59', Morrison 45'	30,244	
27 March 2004	6th	Leeds United	H	W	4–1	Hughes (2) 12', 67, Forssell (2) 69', 82' pen.	29,069	
3 April 2004	6th	Fulham	A	D	0–0		14,667	
10 April 2004	6th	Manchester United	H	L	1–2	Grainger 53'	29,548	
12 April 2004	8th	Portsmouth	A	L	1–3	John 67'	20,104	
17 April 2004	8th	Charlton Athletic	A	D	1–1	Morrison 84'	25,206	
25 April 2004	9th	Wolverhampton Wanderers	H	D	2–2	Forssell 34', Morrison 41'	29,494	
1 May 2004	9th	Arsenal	A	D	0–0		38,061	
8 May 2004	10th	Liverpool	H	L	0–3		29,553	
15 May 2004	10th	Blackburn Rovers	A	D	1–1	John 83'	26,070	

=== League table ===
Pos	Team	Pld	W	D	L	GF	GA	GD	Pts	Qualification or relegation
8	Bolton Wanderers	38	14	11	13	48	56	−8	53	
9	Fulham	38	14	10	14	52	46	+6	52	
10	Birmingham City	38	12	14	12	43	48	−5	50	
11	Middlesbrough	38	13	9	16	44	52	−8	48	Qualification for the UEFA Cup first round (Note: Middlesbrough qualified as the 2003–04 Football League Cup winners.)
12	Southampton	38	12	11	15	44	45	−1	47	

Source: Premier League
Rules for classification: 1) points; 2) goal difference; 3) number of goals scored.

=== Results summary ===
Overall								Home						Away					
Pld	W	D	L	GF	GA	GD	Pts	W	D	L	GF	GA	GD	W	D	L	GF	GA	GD
38	12	14	12	43	48	−5	50	8	5	6	26	24	+2	4	9	6	17	24	−7

== FA Cup ==
Birmingham reached the fifth round of the 2003–04 FA Cup before losing to Sunderland of Division One after a replay.

FA Cup match details
Round	Date	Opponents	Venue	Result	Score F–A	Scorers	Attendance
Third round	3 January 2004	Blackburn Rovers	H	W	4–0	Morrison 23', Clemence 36', Forssell 78', Hughes 84'	18,688
Fourth round	24 January 2004	Wimbledon	H	W	1–0	Hughes 4'	22,159
Fifth round	14 February 2004	Sunderland	A	D	1–1	Forssell 28'	24,966
Fifth round replay	25 February 2004	Sunderland	H	L	0–2		25,645

== League Cup ==
Birmingham entered the 2003–04 League Cup at the second round. They conceded after six minutes away to Blackpool of the Second Division, and when given a chance from the penalty spot, Clemence's kick cleared the bar.

League Cup match details
Round	Date	Opponents	Venue	Result	Score F–A	Scorers	Attendance
Second round	23 September 2003	Blackpool	A	L	0–1		7,370

== Transfers ==
=== In ===
Date	Player	Club	Fee	Ref
1 July 2003	Christophe Dugarry	Bordeaux	Free	
7 July 2003	David Dunn	Blackburn Rovers	£5.5m	
23 July 2003	Luciano Figueroa	Rosario Central	£2.5m	
2 February 2004	Martin Taylor	Blackburn Rovers	£1.25m	

=== Out ===
Date	Player	Fee	Joined†	Ref
8 July 2003	Tommy Mooney	Free	Swindon Town	
8 August 2003	Joey Hutchinson	Free	Darlington	
14 August 2003	Michael Johnson	Nominal	Derby County	
5 September 2003	Geoff Horsfield	£500,000	Wigan Athletic	
12 September 2003	Paul Devlin	£150,000	Watford	
23 December 2003	Luciano Figueroa	Contract cancelled	(Cruz Azul)	
2 February 2004	Jovan Kirovski	Released	(Los Angeles Galaxy)	
11 March 2004	Christophe Dugarry	Released	(Qatar SC)	
12 March 2004	Jeff Kenna	Free	Derby County	
25 March 2004	Craig Fagan	Free	Colchester United	
30 March 2004	Tom Williams	Released	Peterborough United	
18 June 2004	Darren Purse	£750,000	West Bromwich Albion	
30 June 2004	Bryan Hughes	Released	(Charlton Athletic)	

† Brackets round club names denote the player joined that club after his Birmingham City contract expired.

=== Loan in ===
Date	Player	Club	Return	Ref
8 August 2003	Maik Taylor	Fulham	End of season	
28 August 2003	Mikael Forssell	Chelsea	End of season	

=== Loan out ===
Date	Player	Club	Return	Ref
1 August 2003	Craig Fagan	Colchester United	25 March 2004	
10 October 2003	Andrew Barrowman	Crewe Alexandra	One month	
21 November 2003	Mat Sadler	Northampton Town	Two months	
24 December 2003	Nico Vaesen	Gillingham	One month	
1 January 2004	Tom Williams	Peterborough United	Three months	
12 February 2004	Martin Grainger	Coventry City	18 March 2004	
13 February 2004	Nico Vaesen	Bradford City	One month	
18 March 2004	Nico Vaesen	Crystal Palace	End of season	

== Appearances and goals ==
Numbers in parentheses denote appearances made as a substitute.
Players marked † left the club during the playing season.
Players with names in italics and marked * were on loan from another club for the whole of their season with Birmingham.
Players listed with no appearances have been in the matchday squad but only as unused substitutes.
Key to positions: GK – Goalkeeper; DF – Defender; MF – Midfielder; FW – Forward

Players' appearances and goals by competition
No.	Pos.	Nat.	Name	League		FA Cup		League Cup		Total		Discipline	
No.	Pos.	Nat.	Name	Apps	Goals	Apps	Goals	Apps	Goals	Apps	Goals	A yellow rectangle, denoting the yellow penalty card shown to a player being cautioned	A red rectangle, denoting the red penalty card shown to a player being sent off
1	GK	ENG	Ian Bennett	4 (2)	0	0	0	0	0	4 (2)	0	0	0
2	DF	IRE	Jeff Kenna †	14 (3)	2	4	0	0	0	18 (3)	2	1	0
3	DF	ENG	Martin Grainger	3 (1)	1	0	0	0	0	3 (1)	1	0	0
4	DF	IRE	Kenny Cunningham	36	0	4	0	1	0	41	0	3	1
5	DF	ENG	Darren Purse	9	0	3	0	0	0	12	0	1	1
6	MF	SEN	Aliou Cissé	5 (10)	0	0 (1)	0	1	0	6 (11)	0	6	1
7	MF	SCO	Paul Devlin †	0 (2)	0	0	0	0	0	0 (2)	0	9	0
8	MF	WAL	Robbie Savage	31	3	4	0	0	0	34	3	12	0
9	FW	ENG	Geoff Horsfield †	2 (1)	0	0	0	0	0	2 (1)	0	0	0
9	FW	FIN	Mikael Forssell *	32	17	3 (1)	2	0 (1)	0	35 (2)	19	1	0
10	MF	ENG	Bryan Hughes	17 (9)	3	3 (1)	2	0	0	20 (10)	5	0	0
11	MF	AUS	Stan Lazaridis	25 (5)	2	2	0	1	0	28 (5)	2	0	0
12	GK	NIR	Maik Taylor *	34	0	4	0	1	0	39	0	2	2
13	GK	IRE	Colin Doyle	0	0	0	0	0	0	0	0	0	0
14	FW	TRI	Stern John (Note: Soccerbase omits four substitute appearances in the Premier League by Stern John.)	7 (22)	4	1 (1)	0	1	0	9 (23)	4	0	0
15	FW	USA	Jovan Kirovski †	0 (6)	0	0 (1)	0	0 (1)	0	0 (8)	0	0	0
15	DF	ENG	Martin Taylor	11 (1)	1	0	0	0	0	11 (1)	1	0	0
16	MF	ENG	David Dunn	20 (1)	2	3	0	1	0	24 (1)	2	2	0
18	GK	BEL	Nico Vaesen	0	0	0	0	0	0	0	0	0	0
19	FW	IRE	Clinton Morrison	19 (13)	4	4	1	1	0	24 (13)	5	1	0
21	FW	FRA	Christophe Dugarry †	12 (2)	1	0 (1)	0	0	0	12 (3)	1	6	1
22	MF	NIR	Damien Johnson (Note: Soccerbase counts four of Damien Johnson's Premier League starts as substitute appearances.)	35	1	4	0	1	0	40	1	7	0
23	DF	ENG	Jamie Clapham	22 (3)	0	0 (1)	0	1	0	23 (4)	0	0	0
24	MF	ENG	Darren Carter	1 (4)	0	0 (3)	0	0	0	1 (7)	0	0	0
25	DF	ENG	Matthew Upson	30	0	2	0	1	0	33	0	2	0
26	DF	CIV	Olivier Tébily	17 (10)	0	2	0	0	0	19 (10)	0	4	0
27	FW	SCO	Andrew Barrowman	0 (1)	0	0	0	0	0	0 (1)	0	0	0
28	MF	ENG	Carl Motteram	0	0	0	0	0	0	0	0	0	0
32	MF	ENG	Stephen Clemence	32 (3)	2	1 (1)	1	1	0	34 (4)	3	4	0
35	FW	ARG	Luciano Figueroa †	0 (1)	0	0	0	0 (1)	0	0 (2)	0	0	0

Players not included in matchday squads
No.	Pos.	Nat.	Name
20	MF	ENG	Tom Williams †
27	DF	ENG	Joey Hutchinson †
29	DF	ENG	Craig Fagan †
30	DF	ENG	Mat Sadler
34	MF	ENG	Neil Kilkenny

== Sources ==
- Matthews, Tony (1995). Birmingham City: A Complete Record. Derby: Breedon Books. ISBN 978-1-85983-010-9.
- Matthews, Tony (2010). Birmingham City: The Complete Record. Derby: DB Publishing. ISBN 978-1-85983-853-2.
