= Sebastian Pelzer =

German footballer (born 1980)

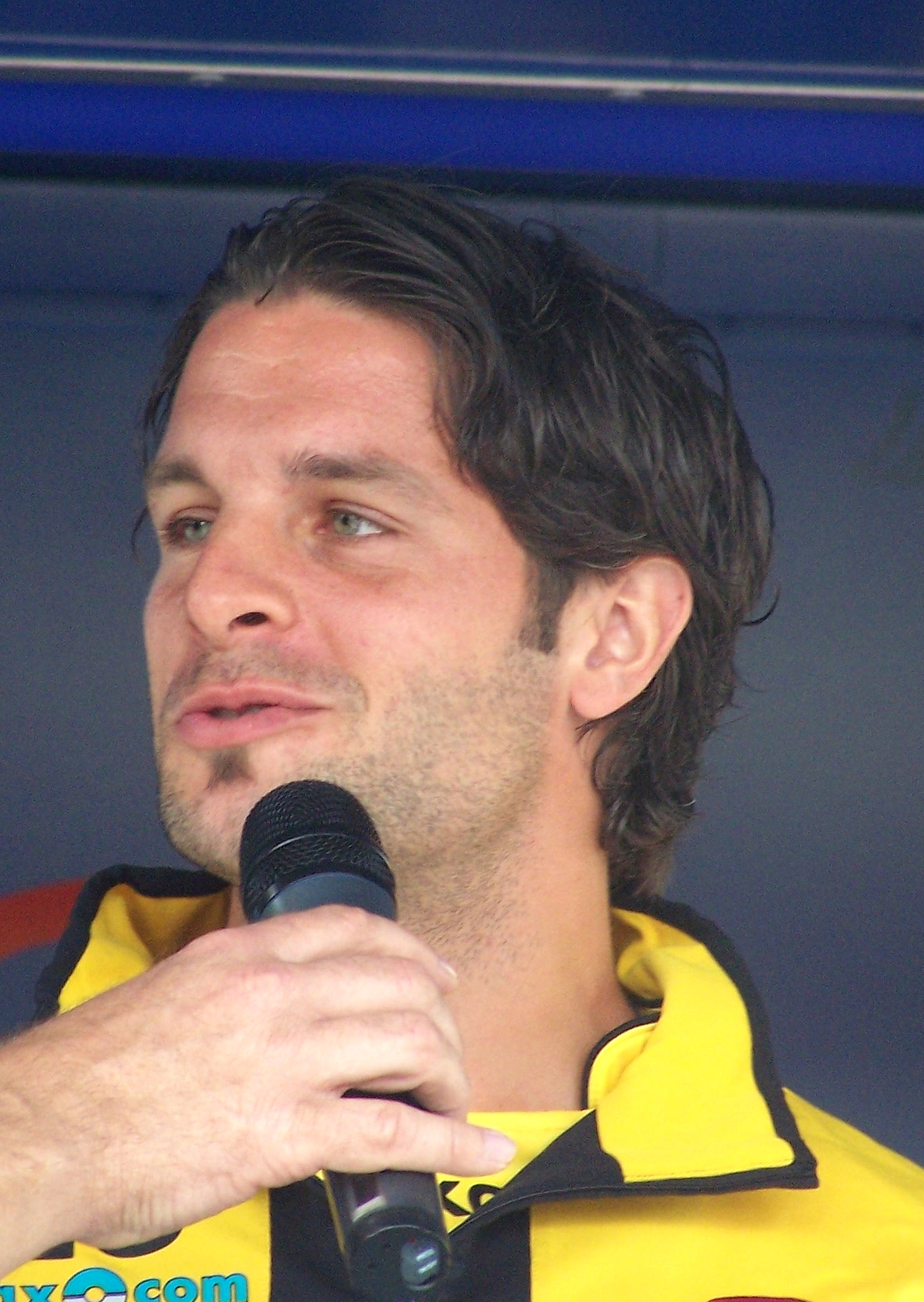
- Pelzer in 2008

Personal information
- Full name: Sebastian Pelzer
- Date of birth: 24 September 1980 (age 46)
- Place of birth: Trier, West Germany
- Height: 1.78 m (5 ft 10 in)
- Positions: Left-back; centre-back

Senior career*
Years	Team	Apps	(Gls)
1995–1997	FSV Salmrohr		
1997–2002	1. FC Kaiserslautern II	60	(6)
2002–2004	Blackburn Rovers	1	(0)
2004–2005	Eintracht Trier	48	(1)
2005–2006	1. FC Saarbrücken	27	(0)
2006–2009	Dynamo Dresden	60	(0)
2009–2010	Rot-Weiss Ahlen	36	(0)
2010–2015	Hansa Rostock	129	(1)

International career
1995–1996	Germany U15	2	(0)
- * Club domestic league appearances and goals

Sebastian Pelzer (born 24 September 1980) is a German former professional footballer who played as a left-back and centre-back. Pelzer represented Germany at youth level and made 130 appearances in the second Bundesliga. As a 15-year-old Pelzer played as left-back for the German National U15 side that played against England U15's in the Olympiastadion (Berlin) in front of 70,000 people, they won 3–0. Pelzer is currently the Chief Sports Officer of Swiss Super League club FC Lugano. He was previously the technical director for Major League Soccer franchise Chicago Fire.

== Playing career ==
Born in Trier, Pelzer began his career with FSV Salmrohr before joining 1. FC Kaiserslautern as a 16-year-old. He played for the U19's for two years before progressing to their reserve side for three years when he was promoted to first team by Otto Rehhagel who coached the club to the Bundesliga title in 1998.

=== English Premier League ===
In 2002 he moved to England, signing for Blackburn Rovers. He made his debut as a reserve player before making his first team appearance in the Football League Cup against Walsall. However, injuries were to blight his time at Blackburn and he was unable to make it back into the first team.

=== Return to Germany with Eintracht Trier ===
He returned to Germany after eighteen months at Ewood Park, joining his hometown club, SV Eintracht Trier 05 who were fighting relegation at the time. Pelzer helped the club back into safety where they finished that season in impressive 11th place. He played here for a season and a half, leaving in 2005 after the club's relegation from the 2. Bundesliga. Linked to A.C. Perugia Calcio, Real Murcia, Hannover 96 and Borussia Mönchengladbach he instead was advised by his agent to make the short journey to 1. FC Saarbrücken, where he played for one season. Despite ambitious plans for promotion with the signing of players such as Mustapha Hadji Saarbrücken suffered relegation, and Pelzer left the club.

=== Dynamo Dresden ===
He then signed for Dynamo Dresden in October 2006, where he became a fans' favourite, and was made captain just two months after signing. The club came close to promotion into the second Bundesliga but faltered late on in the season. Pelzer helped lead the club to success in the Saxony Cup competition of 2007.

Pelzer left the club in the summer of 2007, with the intention of returning to England following trials with Hull City and Plymouth Argyle. Whilst on trial with Plymouth, manager Ian Holloway indicated he wished to sign the player but Pelzer's agent rejected the terms on the grounds of money, something Pelzer was not aware of at the time. He eventually returned to Dynamo Dresden, after the club had agreed a shirt sponsorship deal, and could afford to sign him. Pelzer was soon made captain again and helped the club qualify for the new third Bundesliga in 2008. His contract with Dynamo was annulled in January 2009 at his own request. On 12 January 2009, he moved up a league to join Bundesliga 2 side Rot-Weiss Ahlen who had tried to sign the player during the previous summer.

=== Hansa Rostock ===
On 9 June 2010, he signed a two-year contract with F.C. Hansa Rostock. Pelzer was immediately made captain of the club and was used extensively in the clubs marketing campaign. During the promotion season of 2010–11 Pelzer made 37 league appearances missing just one match through suspension. He also led the club to the Mecklenburg-Vorpommern Cup in 2011. The club made major changes to the promotion winning side, with Pelzer making just 14 league appearances for season. The new team struggled and were eventually relegated after just one season in Bundesliga 2. Pelzer signed a one-year extension to his contract and was back playing regularly in the first team. In 2013 Pelzer suffered a debilitating injury to his toe. Despite this career threatening injury the club extended his contract by two further years with plans to keep Pelzer at the club after his playing career.

In 2015 Pelzer officially retired from playing due to the injury. He has since become a well-known and popular presence in the media appearing in broadcasts in both his native Germany and in England. Pelzer is fluent in English from his time spent playing there. For five years he has sat on the German board of the PFA.

== Post-playing career ==
=== Chicago Fire ===
On 28 December 2019, Sebastian Pelzer was announced as the new Technical Director of Major League Soccer franchise Chicago Fire. The official press release stated: "[Pelzer] will work on all aspects of the Fire’s football operations and will report to new Fire Sporting Director Georg Heitz. In his role as Technical Director, Pelzer, will scout and evaluate players locally and abroad; help establish relationships with clubs around the world; work closely with Fire Head Coach Raphael Wicky and the coaching and technical staff; as well as help with the football operations budget and team salary cap."

In an article in the Chicago Tribune, Heitz described Pelzer as a “maniac” with an extensive knowledge of players. “Sebastian is a database. He knows so many players, he’s interested in various markets. He monitors players every day. He really, in a positive sense, is quite a bit of a maniac when it comes to players. He always tries to find players every day.”

Chicago Fire owner Joe Mansueto describes both Georg Heitz and Sebastian Pelzer as “critical to our future.” Perhaps unusually for an owner he went on to say, “I’m willing to spend as fast as Georg and Sebastian are willing to build in terms of a scouting organization and building up our development of the academy and youth programs.”

On August 18, 2021, it was announced that Fire Owner, Mansueto, had purchased FC Lugano and that the Fire and FC Lugano were to work together as sister clubs. Pelzer was immediately brought in to oversee recruitment and strategy for the Swiss club. Speaking in the Swiss Press Pelzer stated on his role at Lugano, "Of course we exchange ideas regularly. I am in daily contact with [FC Lugano sports coordinator] Carlos da Silva. It's important not to have diametrically different ideas about football."

Pelzer's impact during the club's first season would immediately prove successful, as FC Lugano were able to win their first title in 29 years, winning the 2021–22 Swiss Cup.

Under Pelzer Chicago Fire were able to make returns on their player investments. Particularly from transfers to the English Premier League, a league Pelzer knows well from his time spent playing there. By January 2023 it is estimated Pelzer earned Chicago nearly $40 million USD with the transfers of Gabriel Slonina and Jhon Duran. Slonina was fast-tracked from their Academy and Duran was bought for just $2m.

Pelzer spotted Duran while watching another player at his former club Envigado and quickly sanctioned a £1.5m move. He was convinced the club could make a big profit on the youngster, who moved to America in early 2022 and quickly attracted the attention of several Premier League clubs.

=== FC Lugano ===
On January 1st 2025 Pelzer embarked on an ambitious project with FC Lugano of the Swiss Super League. The club moved to a new stadium and made use of Pelzer's extensive knowledge of global football with the signings of Bekhruz Karimov of Uzbekistan and Dereck Moncada of Honduras. As of September 9 2026, FC Lugano currently sits unbeaten at top of the table and has progressed to the League Phase of the Uefa Conference.

== Personal life ==
Pelzer is the father of FC Energie Cottbus defender Gianluca Pelzer, born 2006. As of July 2026 Gianluca is on loan at Eintracht Trier where he wears the same number 25 shirt once worn by his father.
