= Henning Berg =

Norwegian footballer and manager (born 1969)

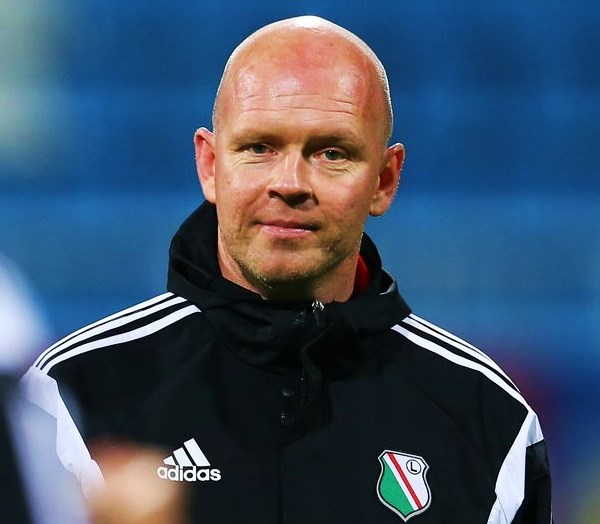
- Berg as a coach of Legia Warsaw in 2014

Personal information
- Full name: Henning Stille Berg
- Date of birth: 1 September 1969 (age 57)
- Place of birth: Eidsvoll, Norway
- Height: 1.84 m (6 ft 0 in)
- Positions: Right-back; centre-back

Team information
- Current team: Omonia (manager)

Youth career
- 1978–1986: KFUM

Senior career*
Years	Team	Apps	(Gls)
1986–1988	KFUM	100	(0)
1988–1991	Vålerenga	66	(0)
1992–1993	Lillestrøm	20	(1)
1993–1997	Blackburn Rovers	159	(4)
1997–2000	Manchester United	66	(2)
2000	→ Blackburn Rovers (loan)	17	(0)
2000–2003	Blackburn Rovers	74	(3)
2003–2004	Rangers	20	(0)
Total		422	(10)

International career
1992–2004	Norway	100	(9)

Managerial career
- 2005–2008: Lyn
- 2008–2011: Lillestrøm
- 2012: Blackburn Rovers
- 2014–2015: Legia Warsaw
- 2016–2017: Videoton
- 2018–2019: Stabæk
- 2019–2022: Omonia
- 2022–2023: Pafos
- 2023–2024: AIK
- 2024–2025: AEK Larnaca
- 2025–: Omonia
- * Club domestic league appearances and goals

Henning Stille Berg (Norwegian pronunciation: [ˈhɛ̂nːɪŋ ˈstɪ̂lːə ˈbærɡ]; born 1 September 1969) is a Norwegian football manager and former player. He is currently the manager of Omonia.

His career lasted from 1988 to 2004, most notably in the Premier League where he won titles with both Blackburn Rovers and Manchester United, becoming the first player to win the Premier League with two clubs. He also played in his native land for Vålerenga and Lillestrøm before finishing his career in the Scottish Premier League with Rangers. He was capped 100 times by Norway, scoring nine goals.

Berg became a manager in 2005 with Lyn and then Lillestrøm. He returned to Blackburn as manager in 2012, but was sacked after just 57 days in the post. In January 2014, he became the new coach of Legia Warsaw, with whom he won the Ekstraklasa and the Polish Cup. He then managed Videoton and Stabæk, before moving to Cyprus, where he managed Omonia, and led them to their first championship in over a decade.

== Club career ==
Born in Eidsvoll, Berg played for Vålerenga and Lillestrøm before coming to England. Blackburn Rovers manager Kenny Dalglish attended a match between England and Norway at Wembley on 14 October 1992 to scout Tore Pedersen, but Pedersen was injured during the match and replaced by Berg. Dalglish was so impressed with Berg that he later offered him a contract. Berg joined Blackburn in January 1993 for £400,000.

Berg made his debut for Blackburn on 2 February 1993, coming on as a substitute in a 2–1 Premier League home defeat to Crystal Palace. He soon made the right-back position his own in the Rovers side and played a vital role in Blackburn's successful title-winning season under manager Kenny Dalglish in 1994–95, missing only two games throughout the season. Also a competent centre-back, Berg's versatility and consistent performances for Blackburn earned him a move to Manchester United in 1997 for a fee of £5 million – at the time the joint-highest fee ever paid for a defender by a British club.

Berg had supported Manchester United as a boy and manager Alex Ferguson had first wanted to sign Berg for United nine years earlier when he was a teenager, but the move fell through because United could not obtain a work permit. Berg was a regular choice in the Manchester United line-up during the 1997–98 season, but the arrival of Jaap Stam in July 1998 meant he was restricted to just 16 Premier League appearances in 1998–99 as the team won the Treble of the Premier League, the FA Cup and the UEFA Champions League. Berg missed the 1999 FA Cup Final and the 1999 UEFA Champions League Final through injury, but still picked up a medal for both, having been involved in most of the team's matches on the way to the final. With the league title in 1999, Berg became the first player to win the Premier League with two clubs, a feat he would be alone with until 2010, when it was matched by Ashley Cole and Nicolas Anelka. Gael Clichy, Kolo Touré, Carlos Tevez, Robert Huth, James Milner, N'Golo Kanté, Riyad Mahrez and Gabriel Jesus have all since matched the feat as well. Berg regained his place in the side during the 1999–2000 season, when Ronny Johnsen was injured.

Berg rejoined Blackburn Rovers in September 2000, initially on loan for three months, before securing a permanent transfer under manager Graeme Souness. Rovers were promoted back to the Premier League in 2000–01. Further success followed for Berg in the following season, when Blackburn won the League Cup, beating Tottenham Hotspur 2–1 at the Millennium Stadium in Cardiff, with Berg lifting the trophy as captain.

Berg later moved on from Blackburn and had a season at the Scottish club Rangers in 2003–04, where he played his last game professionally.

== International career ==
At international level, Berg was part of the Norwegian national team at the 1994 and 1998 FIFA World Cups, as well as Euro 2000. He made his debut for Norway in a friendly against the Faroe Islands in May 1992 and earned a total of 100 caps over a period of 12 years, scoring nine goals. His final international match was a friendly against Wales in May 2004, in which he was substituted early on by Claus Lundekvam to mark the end of his Norway career.

== Managerial career ==
=== Lyn ===
On 22 April 2005, Berg was appointed manager of Lyn at the age of 35, signing a four-year contract with the Oslo side. His first game with Lyn was against Start two days later, getting a 1–1 draw, followed by a 6–1 win against Molde the next week. Lyn finished third that season.

=== Lillestrøm ===
On 19 August 2008, Lyn announced that Berg had accepted an offer from Lillestrøm, where he had last played in 1992. He signed a five-year contract and took over as head coach on 21 October 2008. On 27 October 2011, Berg was sacked three matches before the end of the season as investor Per Berg promised fresh funds for acquiring quality players after the season.

=== Blackburn Rovers ===
While working as a pundit for Norwegian TV, Berg had made a withering assessment of Blackburn Rovers' owners, Venky's. He said: "There are no real managers with credibility who would accept a job like that." On 31 October 2012, Blackburn Rovers announced that Berg had accepted an offer for a three-year contract to manage the club. He became Blackburn's first foreign manager. Berg said of his previous comments about the club's owners, Venky's: "That was me looking at it from the outside without knowing really what was going on in the inside. I think this club at the moment is going in the right direction."

Berg's first match in charge of Blackburn came on 3 November 2012, a 2–0 defeat away to Crystal Palace. His first and only win was on 17 November 2012, a 4–1 victory away to Peterborough. That was to prove to be his only win as Blackburn manager, as Berg was sacked on 27 December, after just 57 days in the post.

On 14 February 2013, the LMA lodged legal proceedings to the high court against Blackburn Rovers for non-payment of wages to Berg.

After leaving Blackburn Rovers, Berg has worked as a scout on an informal basis for Norwich City, looking at matches in both England and Germany.

=== Legia Warsaw ===
On 19 December 2013, it was announced that he will be new manager of Legia Warsaw starting from 1 January 2014. In his first full season as coach, he led the team to the Polish Ekstraklasa title. On 5 October 2015, he was sacked while sitting second in the league, following a 2–2 draw against Górnik Zabrze.

=== Videoton ===
On 5 May 2016, Berg signed a two-year contract with Székesfehérvár-based Hungarian League club Videoton. He was sacked at the end of the season despite having been a contender for the title until the last matchday.

=== Omonia ===
On 6 June 2019, Berg signed a two-year contract with Omonia in Cyprus, which he would later renew for another year.

Berg was responsible for Omonia's return to the Champions League, as they were ranked first in the domestic league when the 2019–20 season was abandoned due to the COVID-19 pandemic. The following year, he led Omonia to win the 2020–21 Cypriot First Division, their first in 11 years, as well as the Super Cup. Although he led Omonia to the 2020–21 UEFA Europa League group stage (the first time the club had made it to a European group stage) and the 2021–22 UEFA Europa Conference League group stage, a dismal 2021–22 league campaign that saw the club out of the top six meant he was released on 28 February 2022.

Berg's work at Omonia was widely praised by pundits, fans and even other managers in the league, not only for restoring success to the club, but for his tactics, the team's exceptional defense, and most importantly, for trusting the local talent in a league notorious for its high percentage of foreign players. Several Cypriot players broke through under Berg, including Loizos Loizou, Marinos Tzionis and Ioannis Kousoulos.

=== Pafos ===
On 12 June 2022, Berg joined Cypriot club Pafos as their new head coach, and his team started the season off with a 13-match long undefeated streak. Despite making expensive transfers in the January transfer window, Pafos' form worsened over time, and Berg was sacked in early April 2023 when his team went seven consecutive games without a win, just three days before their Cypriot Cup semi-final clash. The last game he oversaw was a 2–0 loss to his previous club, Omonia.

=== AEK Larnaca ===
On 14 August 2024, Berg returned to Cyprus and signed a one-season contract with AEK Larnaca. He led AEK to their third Cypriot Cup before leaving the club at the end of the 2024–25 season.

== Career statistics ==
=== Club ===
Appearances and goals by club, season and competition
Club	Season	League			National Cup		League Cup		Continental (Note: Includes UEFA Champions League and UEFA Cup)		Other (Note: Includes FA Community Shield, UEFA Super Cup and FIFA Club World Cup)		Total	
Club	Season	Division	Apps	Goals	Apps	Goals	Apps	Goals	Apps	Goals	Apps	Goals	Apps	Goals
Blackburn Rovers	1992–93	Premier League	4	0	0	0	2	0	—		—		6	0
Blackburn Rovers	1993–94	Premier League	40	1	4	0	3	0	—		—		47	1
Blackburn Rovers	1994–95	Premier League	42	1	2	0	4	0	2	0	1	0	51	1
Blackburn Rovers	1995–96	Premier League	37	0	2	0	4	0	6	0	0	0	49	0
Blackburn Rovers	1996–97	Premier League	36	2	2	0	3	0	—		—		41	2
Blackburn Rovers	Total		159	4	10	0	16	0	8	0	1	0	194	4
Manchester United	1997–98	Premier League	27	1	2	0	0	0	7	1	0	0	36	2
Manchester United	1998–99	Premier League	16	0	5	0	3	0	5	0	1	0	29	0
Manchester United	1999–2000	Premier League	22	1	—		0	0	12	0	3	0	37	1
Manchester United	2000–01	Premier League	1	0	0	0	0	0	0	0	0	0	1	0
Manchester United	Total		66	2	7	0	3	0	23	1	4	0	103	3
Blackburn Rovers (loan)	2000–01	Division One	17	0	0	0	1	0	—		—		18	0
Blackburn Rovers	2000–01	Division One	24	1	3	0	0	0	—		—		27	1
Blackburn Rovers	2001–02	Premier League	34	1	2	0	2	0	—		—		38	1
Blackburn Rovers	2002–03	Premier League	16	1	1	0	0	0	2	0	—		19	1
Blackburn Rovers	Total		91	3	6	0	3	0	2	0	—		102	3
Rangers	2003–04	Scottish Premier League	20	0	3	0	0	0	7	0	—		30	0
Career total			336	9	26	0	22	0	40	1	5	0	429	10

=== International ===
Appearances and goals by national team and year
National team	Year	Apps	Goals
Norway	1992	5	0
Norway	1993	5	0
Norway	1994	13	2
Norway	1995	10	2
Norway	1996	7	0
Norway	1997	7	0
Norway	1998	13	2
Norway	1999	5	0
Norway	2000	11	2
Norway	2001	8	0
Norway	2002	9	1
Norway	2003	6	0
Norway	2004	1	0
Total		100	9

Scores and results list Norway's goal tally first, score column indicates score after each Berg goal.

List of international goals scored by Henning Berg
No.	Date	Venue	Opponent	Score	Result	Competition	Ref.
1	1 June 1994	Ullevaal Stadion, Oslo, Norway	Denmark	2–1	2–1	Friendly	
2	16 November 1994	Dinamo Stadium, Minsk, Belarus	Belarus	1–0	4–0	UEFA Euro 1996 qualifying	
3	26 April 1995	Ullevaal Stadion, Oslo, Norway	Luxembourg	4–0	5–0	UEFA Euro 1996 qualifying	
4	16 August 1995	Ullevaal Stadion, Oslo, Norway	Czech Republic	1–0	1–1	UEFA Euro 1996 qualifying	
5	20 May 1998	Bislett Stadium, Oslo, Norway	Mexico	4–1	5–2	Friendly	
6	14 October 1998	Ullevaal Stadion, Oslo, Norway	Albania	2–2	2–2	UEFA Euro 2000 qualifying	
7	2 February 2000	La Manga Club Football Stadium, Cartagena, Spain	Denmark	1–1	4–2	Friendly	
8	2 February 2000	La Manga Club Football Stadium, Cartagena, Spain	Denmark	3–2	4–2	Friendly	
9	14 May 2002	Ullevaal Stadion, Oslo, Norway	Japan	1–0	3–0	Friendly	

=== Managerial ===
As of match played 21 November 2026

Team	Nat	From	To	Record				
Team	Nat	From	To	G	W	D	L	Win %
Lyn	(Norway)	22 April 2005	9 September 2008	122	55	25	42	45.08
Lillestrøm	(Norway)	21 October 2008	26 October 2011	100	35	30	35	35.00
Blackburn Rovers	(England)	31 October 2012	27 December 2012	10	1	3	6	10.00
Legia Warsaw	(Poland)	1 January 2014	4 October 2015	97	60	16	21	61.86
Videoton	(Hungary)	5 May 2016	3 June 2017	42	22	10	10	52.38
Stabæk	(Norway)	4 July 2018	6 June 2019	27	8	8	11	29.63
Omonia	(Cyprus)	6 June 2019	28 February 2022	113	58	29	26	51.33
Pafos	(Cyprus)	1 July 2022	3 April 2023	33	17	11	5	51.52
AIK	(Sweden)	2 July 2023	14 June 2024	35	16	8	11	45.71
AEK Larnaca	(Cyprus)	14 August 2024	30 June 2025	42	24	12	6	57.14
Omonia	(Cyprus)	1 July 2025	Present	73	45	13	15	61.64
Total				694	341	165	188	49.14

== Honours ==
=== As a player ===
Blackburn Rovers

- Premier League: 1994–95
- Football League Cup: 2001–02

Manchester United

- Premier League: 1998–99, 1999–2000
- FA Cup: 1998–99
- UEFA Champions League: 1998–99

Individual

- Kniksen's Honour Award: 2004
- PFA Team of the Year: 2000–01 First Division

=== As a manager ===
Legia Warsaw

- Ekstraklasa: 2013–14
- Polish Cup: 2014–15

Omonia

- Cypriot First Division: 2020–21, 2025–26
- Cypriot Super Cup: 2021

AEK Larnaca

- Cypriot Cup: 2024–25

Individual

- Piłka Nożna Foreigner of the Year: 2014

== See also ==
- List of men's footballers with 100 or more international caps
