= Garry Flitcroft =

English footballer (born 1972)

Personal information
- Full name: Garry William Flitcroft
- Date of birth: 6 November 1972 (age 53)
- Place of birth: Bolton, Lancashire, England
- Height: 1.83 m (6 ft 0 in)
- Position: Midfielder

Youth career
- Manchester City

Senior career*
Years	Team	Apps	(Gls)
1991–1996	Manchester City	116	(13)
1992	→ Bury (loan)	12	(0)
1996–2006	Blackburn Rovers	248	(14)
2006	Sheffield United	6	(0)
Total		382	(27)

International career
1993	England U21	10	(3)

Managerial career
- 2009–2010: Leigh Genesis
- 2010–2015: Chorley
- * Club domestic league appearances and goals

Garry William Flitcroft (born 6 November 1972) is an English football manager and former professional player who played as a midfielder.

Between 1991 and 2006, Flitcroft spent four seasons in the Premier League with Manchester City, winning the club's Player of the Year award in only his second year in senior football. He joined Blackburn Rovers in 1996, with whom he spent ten years, of which eight were in the Premier League, and won the 2001–02 Football League Cup. He also played briefly in the Football League, beginning his career on loan to Bury and ending it with Sheffield United. He was capped 10 times by England U21, scoring three goals.

In 2009 he became manager of Leigh Genesis and the following year took over as manager of Chorley, where he won two promotions in five years, taking the team up to the Conference North.

== Playing career ==
Flitcroft came through the youth ranks at Manchester City where he made 116 appearances in the Premier League, scoring 13 goals. In only his second season of senior football he was awarded City's Player of the Season award for the 1992–93 season. He played for the England U21s 10 times in 1993. He was also called up to Terry Venables' get-together England squad in April 1995, but ultimately was never capped for the senior side.

In March 1996, he was signed by reigning Premier League Champions Blackburn Rovers for £3.5 million, but was sent off on his debut in a 3–0 defeat to Everton. Rovers were relegated to Division One in 1999 and new manager Graeme Souness appointed Flitcroft captain ahead of the 2000–01 season, in which Rovers gained promotion back to the Premier League. Flitcroft continued in his role as club captain for the next three years, but was suspended for Blackburn's 2001-02 League Cup victory although he did lift the trophy with match captain Henning Berg.

== Managerial career ==
On 23 March 2009, it was announced that Flitcroft would replace Lee Merricks as manager of Northern Premier League side Leigh Genesis. This also came with the news that the club had moved into their new ground at Leigh Sports Village. Flitcroft left Leigh Genesis after revealing to the media that he and many of his players had not been paid at Leigh for some time, and moved to Leigh's rivals, Chorley F.C. in May 2010.

Flitcroft was hugely successful at Chorley, earning them two promotions – as Northern Premier League Division One play-off winners in 2010–11 and then Premier Division Champions in 2013–14. He immediately guided Chorley to 4th place in the Conference North but lost 3–2 at home to Guiseley in the Play Off Final. On 2 July 2015, Flitcroft stepped down as manager and his assistant Matt Jansen was put in charge.

== Personal life ==
Flitcroft's brother David was also a midfielder who played in the lower divisions. Flitcroft married Karen, whom he had met at Turton High School, and the couple had three children. The couple subsequently divorced.

Flitcroft, now owner of a timber frame business called "Flitcraft" with his son Thomas, faced trial in 2019 following a legal dispute. In September 2020 he won the case against a rival business.

=== Flitcroft and the Leveson Inquiry ===
During his marriage, Flitcroft had two affairs, one with a nursery nurse and the second with a lap dancer. After a disagreement with one of the women, the media began to pursue the story, so Flitcroft took out a High-Court injunction, banning media coverage of the affairs. After a long legal battle, during the 2001–02 season an injunction preventing Flitcroft being named ran out. The lawsuit resulting from this allegation, presided over by Lord Chief Justice Lord Woolf, was notable for the way it weighed personal privacy rights against the right to freedom of expression under the European Convention on Human Rights (applicable since the Human Rights Act 1998 came into force in 2000).

In September 2011, Flitcroft was named as a "core participant" in the Leveson Inquiry into the News International phone hacking scandal.

== Honours ==
=== As a player ===
Manchester City

- Player of the Year: 1992–93

Blackburn Rovers

- League Cup: 2001–02

=== As a manager ===
Chorley

- Northern Premier League Division One: play-off winners 2010–11
- Northern Premier League: 2013–14

== Managerial statistics ==
As of July 2015.

Managerial record by team and tenure
Team	From	To	Record					Ref
Team	From	To	P	W	D	L	Win %	Ref
Chorley	May 2010	July 2015	197	102	44	51	51.8	
Total			197	102	44	51	51.8	—
