= James Thomas (footballer, born 1979) =

Welsh footballer

Personal information
- Date of birth: 16 January 1979 (age 47)
- Place of birth: Swansea, Wales
- Position: Striker

Youth career
- –1997: Blackburn Rovers

Senior career*
Years	Team	Apps	(Gls)
1997–2002	Blackburn Rovers	4	(1)
1997	→ West Bromwich Albion (loan)	3	(0)
2000	→ Blackpool (loan)	9	(2)
2000–2001	→ Sheffield United (loan)	10	(1)
2002	→ Bristol Rovers (loan)	7	(1)
2002–2006	Swansea City	57	(16)
2006–2008	Llanelli	8	(0)
Total		107	(21)
- * Club domestic league appearances and goals

James Thomas (born 16 January 1979) is a Welsh former professional footballer who last played for Dandenong Thunder in the Victorian Premier League which is one tier below Australia's national competition. He represented Wales at Under-21 level.

Thomas began his career as a trainee with Blackburn Rovers, turning professional in August 1997. He struggled to establish himself at Ewood Park and was loaned to a number of clubs before being released at the end of the 2001–02 season. A highlight of his loan spells was when he scored the winning goal for Sheffield United against Preston North End, helping them win 3-2 when they had at one stage trailed 2–0. Another loan spell at Bristol Rovers yielded one goal against Rochdale. He scored three goals during his time at Blackburn; once in the league against Bolton Wanderers and twice in a League Cup tie against Portsmouth.

In May 2002 he joined Swansea City and quickly established himself in the first team. He is fondly remembered for the hat-trick he scored in a 4–2 victory over Hull on the last day of the 2002–03 season to save his hometown club from relegation to the Football Conference. With Swansea he became Wales' most capped player at Under-21 level and was called up to the full squad for the match away to Azerbaijan in November 2002, but did not get to play.

Thomas later suffered a knee injury that kept him out of the game for two years. He joined Llanelli in August 2006. After a short time playing in Australia, he returned to Wales where he now works as a Paramedic.
