= 2005–06 Birmingham City F.C. season =

Birmingham City F.C.
2005–06 season
- Chairman: David Gold
- Manager: Steve Bruce
- Ground: St Andrew's
- Premier League: 18th (relegated)
- FA Cup: Sixth round
- League Cup: Quarter-finals
- Top goalscorer: League: Jiří Jarošík (5); All: Mikael Forssell, Jiří Jarošík (8)
- Highest home attendance: 29,257 vs Sunderland, 25 February 2006
- Lowest home attendance: 16.644 vs Reading, League Cup 4th round replay, 7 February 2006
- Average home league attendance: 27,392
Home colours	Away colours	Third colours

The 2005–06 season was Birmingham City Football Club's 103rd season in the English football league system and their fourth in the Premier League. Under the management of Steve Bruce, they finished in 18th position in the 20-team division, so were relegated to the Championship for 2006–07. They entered the 2005–06 FA Cup at the third round and progressed to the sixth round (quarter-final), in which they suffered their heaviest ever FA Cup defeat, and their heaviest defeat at St Andrew's in any competition, losing 7–0 at home to Liverpool. They also reached the quarter-final of the League Cup, in which they were eliminated by Manchester United.

Jiří Jarošík was top scorer in league competition, with just five goals. If all competitions are included, Jarošík and fellow loanee Mikael Forssell scored eight apiece.

== Pre-season ==
=== Pre-season friendlies ===
Date	Opponents	Venue	Result	Score F–A	Scorers	Attendance	Report
13 July 2005	Egersunds IK	A	W	2–0	Gray 44', Kuqi 70'		
16 July 2005	Viking Stavanger	A	W	1–0	Pennant 43'		
19 July 2005	Brann Bergen	A	L	0–4			
23 July 2005	Derby County	A	W	4–0	Forssell 33', Heskey (2) 43' 55', Kuqi 90'		
27 July 2005	Northampton Town	A	L	0–1			
30 July 2005	QPR	A	L	1–2	Pennant 90' (pen)		
30 July 2005	Peterborough United	A	L	1–2	Morrison 35'		
6 August 2005	Deportivo La Coruna 'B'^{1}	A	W	1–0	Forssell (pen)		
6 August 2005	Deportivo La Coruna 'A'^{1}	A	L	0–2			

- Note 1: Each match was 45 minutes long as part of a short three-team tournament in Spain

== Premier League ==
=== Match details ===
Date	League position	Opponents	Venue	Result	Score F–A	Scorers	Attendance	Report
11 August 2005	7th	Fulham	A	D	0–0		16,550	
20 August 2005	13th	Manchester City	H	L	1–2	Butt 7'	26,366	
23 August 2005	18th	Middlesbrough	H	L	0–3		27,998	
27 August 2005	13th	West Bromwich Albion	A	W	3–2	Heskey 10', 33', Jarošík 26'	23,993	
10 September 2005	16th	Charlton Athletic	H	L	0–1		26,846	
17 September 2005	15th	Portsmouth	A	D	1–1	Jarošík 6'	19,319	
24 September 2005	14th	Liverpool	H	D	2–2	Warnock 72' o.g., Pandiani 75'	27,733	
2 October 2005	15th	Arsenal	A	L	0–1		37,891	
16 October 2005	17th	Aston Villa	H	L	0–1		29,312	
22 October 2005	18th	Blackburn Rovers	A	L	0–2		18,341	
29 October 2005	19th	Everton	H	L	0–1		26,554	
5 November 2005	19th	Newcastle United	A	L	0–1		52,191	
26 November 2005	19th	Sunderland	A	W	1–0	Gray 68'	32,442	
5 December 2005	19th	West Ham United	H	L	1–2	Heskey 11'	24,010	
10 December 2005	18th	Fulham	H	W	1–0	Butt 84'	27,597	
17 December 2005	19th	Manchester City	A	L	1–4	Jarošík 76'	41,343	
26 December 2005	19th	Tottenham Hotspur	A	L	0–2		36,045	
28 December 2005	19th	Manchester United	H	D	2–2	Clapham 18', Pandiani 78'	28,459	
31 December 2005	19th	Chelsea	A	L	0–2		40,652	
2 January 2006	19th	Wigan Athletic	H	W	2–0	Melchiot 20', Pennant 33'	29,189	
14 January 2006	19th	Charlton Athletic	A	L	0–2		26,312	
21 January 2006	18th	Portsmouth	H	W	5–0	Jarošík 5', Pennant 37', Upson 55', Forssell 90' pen., Dunn 90'	29,138	
1 February 2006	18th	Liverpool	A	D	1–1	Alonso 88' o.g.	43,851	
4 February 2006	18th	Arsenal	H	L	0–2		27,075	
13 February 2006	18th	West Ham United	A	L	0–3		31,294	
25 February 2006	18th	Sunderland	H	W	1–0	Heskey 39'	29,257	
4 March 2006	18th	Middlesbrough	A	L	0–1		28,141	
11 March 2006	18th	West Bromwich Albion	H	D	1–1	Forssell 49' pen.	28,041	
18 March 2006	18th	Tottenham Hotspur	H	L	0–2		26,398	
26 March 2006	18th	Manchester United	A	L	0–3		69,070	
1 April 2006	19th	Chelsea	H	D	0–0		26,364	
4 April 2006	17th	Bolton Wanderers	H	W	1–0	Jarošík 37'	26,493	
8 April 2006	18th	Wigan Athletic	A	D	1–1	Dunn 77'	18,669	
16 April 2006	18th	Aston Villa	A	L	1–3	Sutton 25'	40,158	
19 April 2006	17th	Blackburn Rovers	H	W	2–1	Butt 62', Forssell 87'	25,287	
22 April 2006	18th	Everton	A	D	0–0		35,420	
29 April 2006	18th	Newcastle United	H	D	0–0		28,331	
7 May 2006	18th	Bolton Wanderers	A	L	0–1		26,275	

=== League table ===
Pos	Team	Pld	W	D	L	GF	GA	GD	Pts	Qualification or relegation
16	Aston Villa	38	10	12	16	42	55	−13	42	
17	Portsmouth	38	10	8	20	37	62	−25	38	
18	Birmingham City (R)	38	8	10	20	28	50	−22	34	Relegation to the Football League Championship
19	West Bromwich Albion (R)	38	7	9	22	31	58	−27	30	Relegation to the Football League Championship
20	Sunderland (R)	38	3	6	29	26	69	−43	15	Relegation to the Football League Championship

Source: Barclays Premier League
Rules for classification: 1) points; 2) goal difference; 3) number of goals scored.
(R) Relegated

=== Results summary ===
Overall								Home						Away					
Pld	W	D	L	GF	GA	GD	Pts	W	D	L	GF	GA	GD	W	D	L	GF	GA	GD
38	8	10	20	28	50	−22	34	6	5	8	19	20	−1	2	5	12	9	30	−21

== FA Cup ==
Round	Date	Opponents	Venue	Result	Score F–A	Scorers	Attendance	Report
Third round	7 January 2006	Torquay United	A	D	0–0		5,974	
Third round replay	17 January 2006	Torquay United	H	W	2–0	Forssell 45', Jarošík 68'	24,650	
Fourth round	28 January 2006	Reading	A	D	1–1	Dunn 67'	23,762	
Fourth round replay	7 February 2006	Reading	H	W	2–1	Forssell 30', Gray 67'	16,644	
Fifth round	19 February 2006	Stoke City	A	W	1–0	Forssell 47'	18,768	
Sixth round	21 March 2006	Liverpool	H	L	0–7		27,378	

== League Cup ==
Round	Date	Opponents	Venue	Result	Score F–A	Scorers	Attendance	Report
Second round	20 September 2005	Scunthorpe United	A	W	2–0	Forssell 15', 70' pen.	6,109	
Third round	26 October 2005	Norwich City	H	W	2–1	Pennant 5', Jarošík 86'	28,825	
Fourth round	29 November 2005	Millwall	A	W	2–2 (a.e.t.) (4–3 pens.)	Gray 10', Heskey 102'	7,732	
Fifth round	20 December 2005	Manchester United	H	L	1–3	Jarošík 75'	20,454	

== Transfers ==
=== In ===
Date	Player	Club†	Fee	Ref
10 June 2005	Mikael Forssell	Chelsea	£3m	
30 June 2005	Mehdi Nafti	Racing Santander	Undisclosed	
5 August 2005	Walter Pandiani	Deportivo La Coruña	£3m	
21 November 2005	Ingi Højsted	(B36 Tórshavn)	Free	
5 January 2006	Chris Sutton	Celtic	Free	
31 January 2006	DJ Campbell	Brentford	£500,000	

† Brackets round club names indicate the player's contract with that club had expired before he joined Birmingham.

=== Out ===
Date	Player	Fee	Joined†	Ref
4 July 2005	Darren Carter	£1.5m	West Bromwich Albion	
18 July 2005	Robbie Blake	Undisclosed	Leeds United	
22 August 2005	Darren Anderton	Free	Wolverhampton Wanderers	
25 August 2005	Clinton Morrison	£2m	Crystal Palace	
13 January 2006	Walter Pandiani	£1m	RCD Espanyol	
31 January 2006	Andrew Barrowman	Free	Walsall	
5 April 2006	Ingi Højsted	Free	(B36 Tórshavn)	
30 June 2006	Sam Alsop	Released		
30 June 2006	Jamie Clapham	Released	(Wolverhampton Wanderers)	
30 June 2006	Chris Cottrill	Released		
30 June 2006	Kenny Cunningham	Released	(Sunderland)	
30 June 2006	James Dormand	Released		
30 June 2006	Muzzy Izzet	Retired		
30 June 2006	Njazi Kuqi	Released	(FC Groningen)	
30 June 2006	Stan Lazaridis	Released	(Perth Glory)	
30 June 2006	Mario Melchiot	Released	(Rennes)	
30 June 2006	Carl Motteram	Released	(Torquay United)	
30 June 2006	Chris Sutton	Released	(Aston Villa)	
30 June 2006	Nico Vaesen	Released	(Lierse)	

† Brackets round club names denote the player joined that club after his Birmingham City contract expired.

=== Loan in ===
Date	Player	Club	Return	Ref
3 August 2005	Nicky Butt	Newcastle United	End of season	
22 August 2005	Jiří Jarošík	Chelsea	End of season	
30 January 2006	Martin Latka	Slavia Prague	End of season	

=== Loan out ===
Date	Player	Club	Return	Ref
17 August 2005	Alex Bruce	Tranmere Rovers	27 October 2005	
9 August 2005	James Dormand	Tamworth	End of season	
5 October 2005	Peter Till	Scunthorpe United	9 January 2006	
24 November 2005	Colin Doyle	Millwall	19 December 2005	
24 November 2005	Carl Motteram	Tamworth	2 January 2006	
24 November 2005	Sam Oji	Doncaster Rovers	Six weeks	
23 December 2005	Colin Doyle	Millwall	Two weeks	
6 January 2006	Asa Hall	Boston United	Three months	
12 January 2006	Peter Till	Boston United	End of season	
12 January 2006	Colin Doyle	Millwall	End of season	
23 January 2006	Njazi Kuqi	Blackpool	One month	
17 March 2006	Njazi Kuqi	Peterborough United	End of season	
24 March 2006	Sam Alsop	Yeovil Town	End of season	

== Appearances and goals ==
Numbers in parentheses denote appearances made as a substitute.
Players marked † left the club during the playing season.
Players with names in italics and marked * were on loan from another club for the whole of their season with Birmingham.
Players listed with no appearances have been in the matchday squad but only as unused substitutes.
Key to positions: GK – Goalkeeper; DF – Defender; MF – Midfielder; FW – Forward

Players' appearances and goals by competition
No.	Pos.	Nat.	Name	League		FA Cup		League Cup		Total		Discipline	
No.	Pos.	Nat.	Name	Apps	Goals	Apps	Goals	Apps	Goals	Apps	Goals	A yellow rectangle, denoting the yellow penalty card shown to a player being cautioned	A red rectangle, denoting the red penalty card shown to a player being sent off
1	GK	NIR	Maik Taylor	34	0	6	0	1	0	41	0	0	0
2	DF	ENG	Martin Taylor	20 (1)	0	3	0	4	0	27 (1)	0	2	0
3	DF	ENG	Jamie Clapham	13 (3)	1	2 (1)	0	3 (1)	0	18 (5)	1	2	0
4	DF	IRE	Kenny Cunningham	31	0	2	0	0	0	33	0	5	1
5	DF	ENG	Matthew Upson	24	1	1	0	4	0	29	1	5	0
6	MF	TUR	Muzzy Izzet	10 (6)	0	1	0	1	0	12 (6)	0	2	1
7	MF	ENG	Jermaine Pennant	35 (3)	2	6	0	4	1	45 (3)	3	4	0
8	FW	URU	Walter Pandiani †	7 (10)	2	0 (1)	0	2 (1)	0	9 (12)	2	3	0
8	DF	CZE	Martin Latka *	6	0	1	0	0	0	7	0	3	0
9	FW	FIN	Mikael Forssell	10 (17)	3	4 (1)	3	2 (1)	2	16 (19)	8	1	0
10	MF	ENG	David Dunn	8 (7)	2	2 (1)	1	1 (1)	0	11 (9)	3	0	0
11	MF	AUS	Stan Lazaridis	11 (6)	0	2	0	0 (1)	0	13 (7)	0	1	0
12	MF	TUN	Mehdi Nafti	1	0	0	0	0	0	1	0	0	0
13	GK	IRL	Colin Doyle	0	0	0	0	0	0	0	0	0	0
14	MF	CZE	Jiří Jarošík *	19 (5)	5	4 (1)	1	2 (1)	2	25 (7)	8	2	0
15	MF	AUS	Neil Kilkenny	6 (12)	0	1 (3)	0	1 (2)	0	8 (17)	0	0	1
16	FW	ENG	Emile Heskey	34	4	3	0	3	1	40	5	4	1
18	GK	BEL	Nico Vaesen	4	0	0	0	3	0	7	0	1	1
19	FW	IRE	Clinton Morrison †	0 (1)	0	0	0	0	0	0 (1)	0	0	0
20	MF	ENG	Nicky Butt *	22 (2)	3	2	0	3	0	27 (2)	3	6	1
21	MF	ENG	Julian Gray	18 (3)	1	4	1	2	1	24 (3)	3	2	0
22	MF	NIR	Damien Johnson	31	0	4	0	3	0	38	0	7	1
23	DF	ENG	Mat Sadler	8	0	0 (1)	0	0	0	8 (1)	0	1	0
24	DF	IRL	Alex Bruce	3 (3)	0	4 (2)	0	0	0	7 (5)	0	2	0
25	MF	ENG	Stephen Clemence	13 (2)	0	4	0	2	0	19 (2)	0	6	0
26	DF	CIV	Olivier Tébily	12 (4)	0	1 (1)	0	1	0	14 (5)	0	4	0
28	FW	ENG	DJ Campbell	4 (7)	0	0	0	0	0	4 (7)	0	0	0
29	DF	NED	Mario Melchiot	22 (1)	1	5	0	1	0	28 (1)	1	3	0
30	DF	ENG	Sam Oji	0	0	0 (1)	0	0	0	0 (1)	0	0	0
31	DF	IRE	Marcos Painter	2 (2)	0	2 (1)	0	1 (1)	0	5 (4)	0	0	0
35	DF	ENG	Sam Alsop	0	0	0	0	0	0	0	0	0	0
36	MF	ENG	Mathew Birley	0 (1)	0	1	0	0 (1)	0	1 (2)	0	0	0
37	MF	ENG	Peter Till	0	0	0	0	0 (1)	0	0 (1)	0	0	0
39	FW	ENG	Sone Aluko	0	0	0	0	0	0	0	0	0	0
40	FW	ENG	Chris Sutton	10	1	1	0	0	0	11	1	2	0
41	FW	ENG	Oliver Allen	0	0	0	0	0	0	0	0	0	0

Players not included in matchday squads
No.	Pos.	Nat.	Name
14	MF	ENG	Darren Anderton †
17	MF	ENG	Asa Hall
19	FW	ENG	James McPike
27	FW	ENG	Carl Motteram
28	FW	SCO	Andrew Barrowman †
32	MF	NIR	David Howland
33	FW	FIN	Njazi Kuqi
34	GK	ENG	James Dormand
38	DF	ENG	Chris Cottrill

== See also ==
- Birmingham City F.C. seasons
