= 2004–05 Birmingham City F.C. season =

Birmingham City F.C.
2004–05 season
- Chairman: David Gold
- Manager: Steve Bruce
- Ground: St Andrew's
- Premier League: 12th
- FA Cup: Fourth round
- League Cup: Third round
- Top goalscorer: League: Emile Heskey (10); All: Emile Heskey (11)
- Highest home attendance: 29,382 vs Aston Villa, 20 March 2005
- Lowest home attendance: 15,363 vs Lincoln City, League Cup 2nd round, 21 September 2004
- Average home league attendance: 28,760
Home colours	Away colours

The 2004–05 season was Birmingham City Football Club's 102nd season in the English football league system, their third season in the Premier League and their 53rd in the top tier of English football. It ran from 1 July 2004 to 30 June 2005. Under the management of former Birmingham City player Steve Bruce, the team finished in 12th place, two places lower than the season before. They reached the fourth round of the FA Cup and the third round of the League Cup. The top scorer for the season was England forward Emile Heskey with eleven goals in all competitions, of which ten were scored in the League.

== Pre-season ==
=== Pre-season friendlies ===
Date	Opponents	Venue	Result	Score F–A	Scorers	Attendance	Report
17 July 2004	Cheltenham Town	A	D	1–1	Izzet 16'	4,255	
19 July 2004	VfB09 Pössneck	A	W	5–0	Morrison (3) 5', 35' 50', John, Forssell	1,000	
21 July 2004	Erzgebirge Aue	(Note: Each match was 50 minutes long as part of a four-team mini-tournament played at the Wasserwerk Stadion, Weiden in der Oberpfalz, Germany.)	L	0–1			
21 July 2004	SpVgg Weiden		W	4–1	John (2), Morrison, Barrowman		
23 July 2004	SSV Ulm	A	L	0–1			
29 July 2004	Sheffield Wednesday	A	W	1–0	Forssell 77'	8,000	
31 July 2004	Hull City	A	W	4–1	Morrison 14', Izzet 35', Delaney (o.g.) 46', Savage 50'		
3 August 2004	Exeter City	A	W	2–0	Forssell 72', Heskey 82'	4,000	
7 August 2004	Osasuna	H	D	1–1	Clapham 86'		

== Premier League ==
=== Season review ===
==== August ====
Steve Bruce named four debutants, Mario Melchiot, Muzzy Izzet, Jesper Grønkjær and club-record signing Emile Heskey, in the starting eleven for the opening-day visit to Portsmouth, with another, Julian Gray, on the bench. Robbie Savage's free kick gave Birmingham an early lead, equalised from the penalty spot five minutes later. Both goalkeepers excelled in the 1–1 draw. Birmingham's midfield dominated at home to Chelsea, but neither team's strikers were on form; the only goal came from substitute Joe Cole's second-half shot deflected past Maik Taylor off Martin Taylor. Heskey's first goal for his new club, an "unstoppable header" from Stan Lazaridis' cross, was enough to beat Manchester City and ended a run of 11 winless Premier League games, but he had an "awful day in front of goal" and was booked for diving against Tottenham Hotspur at White Hart Lane, where Jermain Defoe's solo goal was the difference between the sides.

==== September ====
Even with new signing Dwight Yorke on the left wing, Heskey and Mikael Forssell up front, and two penalty appeals, Birmingham only managed one goal to Mark Viduka's two for Middlesbrough. Maik Taylor's error allowed Charlton Athletic to take a lead, and after Damien Johnson was sent off for two yellow cards, Bruce brought on Yorke and David Dunn, making his first appearance of the season after injury. Dunn was instrumental in the play that led to Izzet's corner from which Yorke headed an equaliser, and Birmingham were the better side thereafter. Without Forssell, whose loan was ended early after exploratory surgery found a serious issue with his knee, Bruce selected a five-man midfield with Heskey as lone striker away to fourth-placed Bolton Wanderers. They duly fell behind, Izzet equalised just after half-time, and the game ended 1–1 after Henrik Pedersen's goal for Bolton was incorrectly disallowed for offside and Heskey's last-seconds header "was going in until it diverted past the far post."

==== October ====
Nicky Butt scored an equaliser when Newcastle United came to St Andrew's. Goals from Yorke and Upson had given Birmingham a 2–1 lead, but Butt pounced on 67 minutes to rescue the Magpies a point. Birmingham held Manchester United to a goalless draw at St Andrew's two weeks later and also played out a 0–0 draw at St Mary's Stadium against Southampton after that. But they were disappointing in a 1–0 loss at home to Crystal Palace on 24 October. Former Birmingham striker Andrew Johnson scored the goal for Palace, who were coming into form. Johnson ran clear of the Birmingham backline after a quick Palace counterattack.

==== November ====
Following a run of eight games without a win, Birmingham beat Liverpool 1–0 at Anfield. Veteran Darren Anderton scored the goal on 77 minutes. He turned home from one yard out after Upson had headed a corner across goal. It was Birmingham's first away win in the league all season. But Birmingham fell to a 1–0 defeat at home to Everton the following week. Thomas Gravesen scored a 69th-minute penalty after Izzet handled a shot on the goalline. Referee Rob Styles sent Izzet off and awarded Everton the spot-kick. Heskey was denied a leveller by a great last-ditch block by Tony Hibbert and Yorke wasted a late chance from ten yards. Birmingham wasted a two-goal lead at Ewood Park against Blackburn Rovers. Matt Jansen gave the hosts an early lead with an incisive finish but Anderton equalised 12 minutes later. Robbie Savage put Birmingham ahead on 38 minutes after Melchiot's marauding run down the right. Moments before half-time Dunn netted against his old side to give Birmingham a 3–1 lead at the interval. But Steven Reid and Paul Gallagher's goals in the second period rescued Rovers an unlikely point. Clinton Morrison gave Birmingham an early lead against Norwich at St Andrew's with his first goal of the campaign, but Darren Huckerby's stunning second-half strike denied the Blues their third league win of the season.

==== December ====
Arsenal thumped Birmingham 3–0 in early December. Robert Pires gave the Gunners the advantage before Thierry Henry netted twice. Birmingham bounced back by beating arch-rivals Aston Villa 2–1 on 12 December at Villa Park. Clinton Morrison scored the opener after Villa goalkeeper Thomas Sørensen let the ball slip through his hands. Shortly afterwards, David Dunn doubled Birmingham's lead after a swift counterattack. He converted Damien Johnson's cross to silence Villa Park. Gareth Barry scored a late consolation for the hosts but they were unable to prevent another defeat to their city rivals. City recorded back-to-back league wins for the first time that season when they beat West Bromwich Albion 4–0 at St Andrew's. Former Birmingham defender Darren Purse conceded a penalty by holding Morrison and Savage was able to net his third goal of the season. Morrison, who impressed throughout, scored his side's second on 23 minutes after a quick free-kick and, minutes afterwards, Heskey angled home Birmingham's third. Anderton heaped more misery on the struggling visitors by scoring a late free-kick. And Birmingham moved up to 12th for the visit of Middlesbrough on Boxing Day. Jimmy Floyd Hasselbaink had an early goal disallowed for offside before Morrison netted his third goal in as many matches. Heskey confirmed Birmingham's dominance when he headed in from six yards moments before half-time. Birmingham's impressive December form continued at Fulham on 28 December. Heskey lashed his side ahead with a stunning drive on 25 minutes but Sylvain Legwinski equalised against the run of play. Darren Carter turned home a Heskey header to restore Birmingham's advantage four minutes before half-time. Savage sealed the win with a spectacular second-half volley. Tomasz Radzinski found the net late on for a consolation goal.

==== January ====
Following a successful December, Birmingham slumped to four straight losses in January and, by the end of the month, fell to 15th in the table. By the time Emile Heskey scored at St James' Park, Birmingham were already 2–0 down to Newcastle United. Shola Ameobi and Lee Bowyer had scored. Kevin Nolan scored a last-minute winner as Bolton Wanderers won for the first time in the Premiership since October by beating Birmingham 2–1 at St Andrew's. Birmingham's dreadful run continued as they lost 3–1 at The Valley to Charlton Athletic. Steve Bruce's side didn't manage to record a single point during January. Fulham won at St Andrew's on 22 January. An own goal by Moritz Volz gave Birmingham the lead on 51 minutes. Luís Boa Morte was soon booked for diving under pressure by Birmingham goalkeeper Maik Taylor but, minutes later, Fulham were awarded a spot-kick. Boa Morte went to ground again under Damien Johnson's challenge but contact appeared to be outside the penalty box. Referee Phil Dowd awarded the penalty and Andy Cole converted. Fulham won it after Papa Bouba Diop scored a late header.

==== February ====
Birmingham signed striker Walter Pandiani and winger Jermaine Pennant on loans in January after slipping towards the relegation zone. The duo combined in their next game at St Andrew's against struggling Southampton. Pandiani headed home a Pennant cross on 12 minutes. Fellow new signing Robbie Blake scored from the penalty spot on 41 minutes after Melchiot was fouled. Southampton debutant Henri Camara netted a spectacular consolation in the second period. Three days later, on 5 February, Birmingham lost 2–0 at Old Trafford to Manchester United. Wayne Rooney scored the pick of the goals against an injury-ravaged City team. But resilient Birmingham bounced back to beat Liverpool 2–0 on 12 February. Sami Hyypiä fouled ex-Liverpool striker Heskey in the box and Pandiani duly delivered from the spot on 38 minutes. Birmingham doubled their advantage moments before half-time. Pennant crossed for Julian Gray to head in his first goal of the campaign. Birmingham completed the double over Liverpool that season. The win was followed by a 2–0 loss at Crystal Palace, who celebrated the double over Birmingham. Upson conceded two penalties, both scored by Andrew Johnson. The referee was Phil Dowd, whom Bruce publicly criticised after the match as he had now given three penalties against Birmingham in the past two games he refereed them.

==== March ====
Birmingham began March poorly, with a 2–0 defeat at West Brom. The Baggies were fighting to stay in the division and easily saw off a lethargic Birmingham team. Neil Clement and Kevin Campbell scored the second-half goals. Following an international break, Birmingham rallied to beat rivals Aston Villa and celebrated another double over their neighbours. Heskey put his side ahead on 52 minutes after another goalkeeping error by Sørensen. Gray sealed the victory late on with his second goal in four games.

==== April ====
The win over Aston Villa saw Bruce's squad climb up to 13th in the table. They faced Tottenham Hotspur at St Andrew's on 2 April. Stephen Kelly, who would later go on to become a Birmingham player, netted Spurs' opener on 59 minutes but Darren Carter levelled for the hosts on 66 minutes with his second goal of the campaign. Birmingham were denied a win against Chelsea at Stamford Bridge after a late Didier Drogba goal cancelled out another Pandiani strike. The Uruguayan was becoming a favourite with the fans, who were calling for him to be signed permanently. Birmingham drew for a third time in a row on 16 April 16 when Portsmouth travelled to St Andrew's. Chances were at a premium in a dull 0–0 draw. Manchester City thumped Birmingham City 3–0 on 20 April. Clinton Morrison thought he had given his side the lead early on but the goal was ruled out for offside. The hosts scored all their goals in the second-half, including an unfortunate own goal by Maik Taylor. Birmingham scored an early goal at Goodison Park to take the lead against Everton. Heskey powered home from 20 yards but Birmingham were denied all three points late on. Experienced forward Duncan Ferguson scored after a goalmouth scramble to rescue Everton a draw.

==== May ====
Heskey continued his impressive form in Birmingham's next game, against Blackburn Rovers. Birmingham fell behind at St Andrew's to an early Jon Stead goal but, in the second half, Blake netted his second goal for Blues. Heskey won it on 80 minutes after rifling home a long-range strike with his weaker left foot for his 10th goal of the season. But Birmingham were unable to cement back-to-back victories. They travelled to a Norwich City side fighting to stay in the league. The Canaries won the match 1–0, courtesy of a Dean Ashton penalty in the first half. Birmingham played most of the match with ten men after Damien Johnson punched an opponent. Arsenal visited St Andrew's to complete the season. Pandiani gave Birmingham the lead on 79 minutes with his fourth goal for the club after a goalmouth scramble but veteran Dennis Bergkamp equalised on 88 minutes. An error by Philippe Senderos allowed Heskey in to crash home a winner in injury time.

=== Match details ===
Premier League match details
Date	League position	Opponents	Venue	Result	Score F–A	Scorers	Attendance
14 August 2004	5th	Portsmouth	A	D	1–1	Savage 10'	20,021
21 August 2004	19th	Chelsea	H	L	0–1		28,559
24 August 2004	7th	Manchester City	H	W	1–0	Heskey 8'	28,551
28 August 2004	13th	Tottenham Hotspur	A	L	0–1		35,290
11 September 2004	14th	Middlesbrough	A	L	1–2	Heskey 42'	30,252
18 September 2004	14th	Charlton Athletic	H	D	1–1	Yorke 68'	27,400
25 September 2004	15th	Bolton Wanderers	A	D	1–1	Izzet 49'	23,692
3 October 2004	15th	Newcastle United	H	D	2–2	Yorke 23', Upson 57'	29,021
16 October 2005	14th	Manchester United	H	D	0–0		29,221
24 October 2004	14th	Southampton	A	D	0–0		27,568
30 October 2004	16th	Crystal Palace	H	L	0–1		28,916
6 November 2004	14th	Liverpool	A	W	1–0	Anderton 77'	42,669
13 November 2004	15th	Everton	H	L	0–1		28,388
21 November 2004	14th	Blackburn Rovers	A	D	3–3	Anderton 17', Savage 38', Dunn 45'	20,290
27 November 2004	13th	Norwich City	H	D	1–1	Morrison 9'	29,120
4 December 2004	15th	Arsenal	A	L	0–3		38,064
12 December 2004	14th	Aston Villa	A	W	2–1	Morrison 9', Dunn 18'	41,329
18 December 2004	14th	West Bromwich Albion	H	W	4–0	Savage 4' pen., Morrison 23', Heskey 30'	28,880
26 December 2004	12th	Middlesbrough	H	W	2–0	Morrison 10', Heskey 45'	29,082
28 December 2004	9th	Fulham	A	W	3–2	Heskey 25', Carter 41', Savage 53'	18,706
1 January 2005	12th	Newcastle United	A	L	1–2	Heskey 64'	52,222
4 January 2005	13th	Bolton Wanderers	H	L	1–2	Upson 66'	27,177
15 January 2005	14th	Charlton Athletic	A	L	1–3	Melchiot 55'	26,111
22 January 2005	15th	Fulham	H	L	1–2	Volz 51' o.g.	28,512
2 February 2005	14th	Southampton	H	W	2–1	Pandiani 12', Blake 41' pen.	28,797
5 February 2005	14th	Manchester United	A	L	0–2		67,838
12 February 2005	12th	Liverpool	H	W	2–0	Pandiani 38' pen., Gray 45'	29,318
26 February 2005	12th	Crystal Palace	A	L	0–2		23,376
6 March 2005	13th	West Bromwich Albion	A	L	0–2		25,749
20 March 2005	13th	Aston Villa	H	W	2–0	Heskey 52', Gray 89'	29,382
2 April 2005	13th	Tottenham Hotspur	H	D	1–1	Carter 66'	29,304
9 April 2005	13th	Chelsea	A	D	1–1	Pandiani 65'	42,031
16 April 2005	12th	Portsmouth	H	D	0–0		28,883
20 April 2005	13th	Manchester City	A	L	0–3		42,453
23 April 2005	13th	Everton	A	D	1–1	Heskey 5'	36,828
30 April 2005	12th	Blackburn Rovers	H	W	2–1	Blake 61', Heskey 8'	28,621
7 May 2005	13th	Norwich City	A	L	0–1		25,477
15 May 2005	12th	Arsenal	H	W	2–1	Pandiani 80', Heskey 90'	29,302

=== League table ===
Pos	Team	Pld	W	D	L	GF	GA	GD	Pts	Qualification or relegation
10	Aston Villa	38	12	11	15	45	52	−7	47	
11	Charlton Athletic	38	12	10	16	42	58	−16	46	
12	Birmingham City	38	11	12	15	40	46	−6	45	
13	Fulham	38	12	8	18	52	60	−8	44	
14	Newcastle United	38	10	14	14	47	57	−10	44	Qualification for the Intertoto Cup third round

Rules for classification: 1) points; 2) goal difference; 3) number of goals scored.

=== Results summary ===
Overall								Home						Away					
Pld	W	D	L	GF	GA	GD	Pts	W	D	L	GF	GA	GD	W	D	L	GF	GA	GD
38	11	12	15	40	46	−6	45	8	6	5	24	15	+9	3	6	10	16	31	−15

== FA Cup ==
Round	Date	Opponents	Venue	Result	Score F–A	Scorers	Attendance	Report
Third round	8 January 2005	Leeds United	H	W	3–0	Heskey 11', Carter (2) 21', 65'	25,159	
Fourth round	30 January 2005	Chelsea	A	L	0–2		40,379	

== League Cup ==
Birmingham lost in the third round of the 2004–05 League Cup to Premier League club Fulham.

Round	Date	Opponents	Venue	Result	Score F–A	Scorers	Attendance	Report
Second round	3 October 2004	Lincoln City	H	W	3–1	Grønkjær 64', Morrison 77', Savage 80' pen.	15,363	
Third round	27 October 2004	Fulham	H	L	0–1		26,371	

== Transfers ==
=== In ===
Date	Player	Club†	Fee	Ref
18 May 2004	Emile Heskey	Liverpool	£6,250,000	
23 June 2004	Julian Gray	(Crystal Palace)	Free	
1 July 2004	Muzzy Izzet	(Leicester City)	Free	
9 July 2004	Mario Melchiot	(Chelsea)	Free	
12 July 2004	Jesper Grønkjær	Chelsea	£2,200,000	
10 August 2004	Darren Anderton	(Tottenham Hotspur)	Free	
31 August 2004	Dwight Yorke	Blackburn Rovers	Undisclosed	
1 January 2005	Njazi Kuqi	Lahti	£400,000	
5 January 2005	Robbie Blake	Burnley	£1,250,000	
25 January 2005	Alex Bruce	Blackburn Rovers	Undisclosed	

† Brackets round club names denote the player's contract with that club expired before he joined Birmingham City.

=== Out ===
Date	Player	Fee	Joined†	Ref
6 August 2004	Aliou Cissé	£300,000	Portsmouth	
14 September 2004	Stern John	£200,000	Coventry City	
1 January 2005	Jesper Grønkjær	Undisclosed	Atlético Madrid	
19 January 2005	Robbie Savage	£3,000,000	Blackburn Rovers	
30 June 2005	Ian Bennett	Free	(Leeds United)	
25 April 2005	Dwight Yorke	Cancelled	(Sydney FC)	

† Brackets round club names denote the player joined that club after his Birmingham City contract expired.

=== Loan in ===
Date	Player	Club	Return	Ref
1 July 2004	Mikael Forssell	Chelsea	End of season	
18 January 2005	Salif Diao	Liverpool	End of season	
31 January 2005	Mehdi Nafti	Racing Santander	End of season	
31 January 2005	Walter Pandiani	Deportivo La Coruña	End of season	
31 January 2005	Jermaine Pennant	Arsenal	End of season	

=== Loan out ===
Date	Player	Club	Return	Ref
2 August 2004	Andrew Barrowman	Blackpool	Three weeks	
16 September 2004	Darren Carter	Sunderland	6 December 2004	
22 October 2004	Colin Doyle	Chester City	One month	
18 November 2004	Neil Kilkenny	Oldham Athletic	End of season	
4 December 2004	Colin Doyle	Nottingham Forest	End of season	
9 December 2004	Ian Bennett	Sheffield United	One month	
16 February 2005	Ian Bennett	Coventry City	One month	
11 March 2005	Alex Bruce	Sheffield Wednesday	End of season	

== Appearances and goals ==
Numbers in parentheses denote appearances made as a substitute.
Players marked † left the club during the playing season.
Players with names in italics and marked * were on loan from another club for the whole of their season with Birmingham.
Players listed with no appearances have been in the matchday squad but only as unused substitutes.
Key to positions: GK – Goalkeeper; DF – Defender; MF – Midfielder; FW – Forward

Players' appearances and goals by competition
No.	Pos.	Nat.	Name	League		FA Cup		League Cup		Total		Discipline	
No.	Pos.	Nat.	Name	Apps	Goals	Apps	Goals	Apps	Goals	Apps	Goals	A yellow rectangle, denoting the yellow penalty card shown to a player being cautioned	A red rectangle, denoting the red penalty card shown to a player being sent off
1	GK	NIR	Maik Taylor	38	0	2	0	2	0	42	0	0	0
2	DF	CIV	Olivier Tebily	9 (6)	0	0 (2)	0	0	0	9 (8)	0	2	0
3	DF	ENG	Jamie Clapham	18 (9)	0	1 (1)	0	1 (1)	0	20 (11)	0	0	0
4	DF	IRE	Kenny Cunningham	36	0	1	0	1	0	38	0	3	0
5	DF	ENG	Matthew Upson	36	2	2	0	2	0	40	2	7	0
6	MF	TUR	Muzzy Izzet	10	1	0	0	0	0	10	1	3	1
7	MF	DEN	Jesper Grønkjær †	13 (3)	0	0	0	2	1	15 (3)	1	1	0
7	FW	ENG	Robbie Blake	2 (9)	2	1 (1)	0	0	0	3 (10)	2	0	0
8	MF	WAL	Robbie Savage †	18	4	0	0	1	1	19	5	6	0
8	MF	ENG	Jermaine Pennant	12	0	0	0	0	0	12	0	3	0
9	FW	FIN	Mikael Forssell * †	4	0	0	0	0	0	4	0	0	0
9	FW	URU	Walter Pandiani *	13 (1)	4	0	0	0	0	13 (1)	4	2	0
10	MF	ENG	David Dunn	9 (2)	2	0	0	0 (1)	0	9 (3)	2	4	0
11	MF	AUS	Stan Lazaridis	15 (5)	0	1	0	0 (1)	0	16 (6)	0	1	0
12	GK	ENG	Ian Bennett	0	0	0	0	0	0	0	0	0	0
14	FW	TRI	Stern John †	0 (3)	0	0	0	0	0	0 (3)	0	0	0
14	FW	FIN	Njazi Kuqi	0	0	0	0	0	0	0	0	0	0
15	DF	ENG	Martin Taylor	4 (3)	0	1	0	1	0	6 (3)	0	1	0
16	FW	ENG	Emile Heskey	34	10	2	1	2	0	38	11	6	0
18	GK	BEL	Nico Vaesen	0	0	0	0	0	0	0	0	0	0
19	FW	IRE	Clinton Morrison	13 (13)	4	1 (1)	0	0 (1)	1	14 (15)	5	5	0
20	MF	SEN	Salif Diao *	2	0	0	0	0	0	2	0	1	0
21	MF	ENG	Julian Gray	18 (14)	2	2	0	2	0	22 (14)	2	0	0
22	MF	NIR	Damien Johnson	36	0	0	0	0 (1)	0	36 (1)	0	8	2
24	MF	ENG	Darren Carter	12 (3)	2	2	2	0	0	14 (3)	4	1	0
25	MF	ENG	Stephen Clemence	13 (9)	0	2	0	2	0	17 (9)	0	3	0
29	DF	NED	Mario Melchiot	33	1	2	0	2	0	37	1	3	0
32	MF	ENG	Darren Anderton	9 (11)	3	2	0	2	0	13 (11)	3	2	0
33	FW	TRI	Dwight Yorke	4 (9)	2	0 (1)	0	2	0	6 (10)	2	1	0
36	MF	TUN	Mehdi Nafti *	7 (3)	0	0	0	0	0	7 (3)	0	4	0

Players not included in matchday squads
No.	Pos.	Nat.	Name
13	GK	IRE	Colin Doyle
17	FW	ENG	Neil Kilkenny
20	DF	ENG	Martin Grainger †
23	DF	ENG	Mat Sadler
26	DF	ENG	Chris Cottrill
27	FW	SCO	Andrew Barrowman
28	MF	ENG	Carl Motteram
30	DF	ENG	Sam Oji
31	DF	ENG	Sam Alsop
34	MF	ENG	Peter Till
35	DF	IRE	Alex Bruce

== Sources ==
- Matthews, Tony (1995). Birmingham City: A Complete Record. Derby: Breedon Books. ISBN 978-1-85983-010-9.
- Matthews, Tony (2010). Birmingham City: The Complete Record. Derby: DB Publishing. ISBN 978-1-85983-853-2.
- For match dates, league positions and results: "Birmingham City 2004–2005: Results". Statto Organisation. Archived from the original on 2 October 2013.
- For lineups, appearances, goalscorers and attendances: Matthews (2010), Complete Record, pp. 444–445.
- For goal times: "Birmingham Results 2004/05". Soccerbase. Centurycomm.
- For transfers: "Birmingham Transfers 2004/05". Soccerbase. Centurycomm.
