= 2012–13 Atromitos F.C. season =

Atromitos
2012–13 season
- Chairman: Georgios Spanos
- Manager: Dušan Bajević (Matchdays 1-15); Nikos Anastopoulos (Matchdays 16-28); Georgios Paraschos (Matchdays 29-PO6)
- Stadium: Peristeri Stadium (Capacity: 10,200)
- Super League Greece: 3rd
- Greek Football Cup: Round of 32
- UEFA Europa League: Play-off round
- Top goalscorer: League: Karagounis(5 goals); All: Karagounis(5 goals)
- Average home league attendance: 2,586
Home colours	Away colours	Third colours

The 2012–13 season of Atromitos was the 90th in the club's history and the second that the club participated in the UEFA Europa League, after 2006–07. It also was the fifth consecutive season that the club competed in the Super League Greece.

== Club ==
(as of 2 June 2013)

=== Athletic staff ===
Position	Staff
Head coach	Georgios Paraschos
Coach assistant	Panayiotis Gungides
Goalkeeping coach	Slobodan Sujica
Fitness coach	Sotirios Kakaryias
Technical Director	Ioannis Aggelopoulos
General Director	Spyridon Sofianos
Scouter	Apostolos Apostolou
Medical Director	Nikolaos Piskopakis
Doctor	Petros Kapralos
Physiotherapist	Panayiotis Ambeliotis
Physiotherapist	Nikolaos Zafiropoulos
Caregiver	Nikolaos Katsikas
Exercise Physio	Georgios Ziogas
Bus driver	Angelos Verikakis

Last updated: 2 July 2013
Source: Atromitos F.C.

=== Other information ===
President & CEO	Georgios Spanos
Vice President	Evangelos Batayiannis
Vice CEO	Ekaterini Koxenoglou
Ground Manager	Panayiotis Michaletos
Press Director	Pavlos Katonis
Marketing Director	Spyridon Boulousis
Security Director	Georgios Petrou
Information Director	Roberto Panayos
Accountants Director	Vasilios Karakatsanis
Club Lawyer	Argirios Livas
Secretary Director	Christina Moschona
Tickets Director	Marios Panayos
Ground (capacity and dimensions)	Peristeri Stadium (10,200 / 102x65 metres)

Last updated: 2 July 2013
Source: Atromitos F.C.

=== Squad statistics ===
No.	Pos.	Name	Age	Apps	Gls	Yellow card	Red card
Goalkeepers
1	GK	(France) Charles Itandje	30	19	0	0	0
12	GK	(Greece) Fotis Karagiolidis	25	0	0	0	0
28	GK	(Spain) Manolo	27	0	0	0	0
30	GK	(Croatia) Velimir Radman	29	17	0	3	0
94	GK	(Greece) Vasilis Barkas	18	0	0	0	0
Defenders
2	DF	(Greece) Ioannis Skondras	22	33	2	9	0
3	DF	(Greece) Kostas Giannoulis	25	32	1	7	0
4	DF	(Greece) Stathis Tavlaridis	32	21	1	9	2
6	DF	(Greece) Sokratis Fytanidis	28	31	3	8	0
13	DF	(Greece) Evangelos Nastos	32	9	0	0	0
18	DF	(Greece) Evangelos Ikonomou	25	0	0	0	0
24	DF	(Greece) Nikolaos Lazaridis	33	26	1	1	0
31	DF	(Greece) Panagiotis Simitsis	19	0	0	0	0
32	DF	(Greece) Theodoros Papoutsogiannopoulos	18	0	0	0	0
Midfielders
7	MF	(Brazil) Eduardo Brito	30	33	3	6	0
8	MF	(Germany) Denis Epstein	26	23	0	3	0
10	MF	(Greece) Thanasis Karagounis	21	28	5	5	0
14	MF	(Greece) Manolis Kallergis	22	1	0	0	0
16	MF	(Greece) Panagiotis Ballas	19	7	0	2	0
17	MF	(Argentina) Walter Iglesias	27	30	3	13	0
21	MF	(Greece) Elini Dimoutsos	24	32	1	8	0
22	MF	(Greece) Antonis Athanasiou	20	0	0	0	0
23	MF	(Portugal) Fábio Moreira Tavares	24	0	0	0	0
26	MF	(Argentina) Pitu Garcia	28	30	0	3	0
29	MF	(Ghana) Arago Jamal	19	0	0	0	0
Forwards
5	FW	(Nigeria) Chigozie Udoji	26	16	2	0	0
9	FW	(Finland) Njazi Kuqi	22	21	3	3	0
11	FW	(Serbia) Nikola Beljić	29	15	0	1	0
20	FW	(Greece) Tasos Karamanos	26	16	4	0	0
33	FW	(Greece) Vangelis Mantzios	29	24	1	1	0
86	FW	(Brazil) Chumbinho	26	30	2	6	0
90	FW	(Italy) Stefano Napoleoni	29	7	1	1	0

Source: Superleague Greece 2012–13 Compilation.

== League table ==
=== Main season ===
Pos	Team	Pld	W	D	L	GF	GA	GD	Pts	Qualification or relegation
2	PAOK	30	18	8	4	46	19	+27	62	Qualification for the Play-offs
3	Asteras Tripolis	30	17	5	8	41	25	+16	56	Qualification for the Play-offs
4	Atromitos	30	11	13	6	26	22	+4	46	Qualification for the Play-offs
5	PAS Giannina	30	12	8	10	28	24	+4	44	Qualification for the Play-offs
6	Panathinaikos (Note: Panathinaikos started the league season with minus 2 points because of severe crowd violence during their home match against Olympiacos last year.)	30	10	12	8	32	30	+2	40 (Note: 6th place play-off: Panathinaikos–Skoda Xanthi 3–0.)	

Source: Super League Greece
Rules for classification: 1) Points; 2) Head-to-head points; 3) Head-to-head goal difference.
If in current league table there are tied teams after applying criteria 1 to 3, they are considered to share places and listed in Greek language alphabetic order.
If in final league table there are still tied teams after applying criteria 1 to 3, a decision match (or matches if they are more than two) are to be played but only in three cases: to determine the champion, to fill spots in the play-off or to determine the teams to be relegated. In any other case, the final standings of tied teams are determined with a public draw

=== Play-offs ===
Pos	Team	Pld	W	D	L	GF	GA	GD	Pts	Qualification	PAOK	ATR	AST	PAS
2	PAOK	6	3	0	3	7	7	0	13	Qualification for the Champions League third qualifying round		1–2	1–0	0–1
3	Atromitos	6	3	2	1	8	5	+3	11	Qualification for the Europa League play-off round (Note: Since Asteras Tripolis lost the 2012–13 Greek Football Cup final to a team already qualified for European competitions, Olympiacos, all of the Europa League allocations were made through play-off positions.)	2–1		0–0	2–0
4	Asteras Tripolis	6	2	1	3	6	7	−1	9	Qualification for the Europa League third qualifying round	1–2	2–1		2–1
5	PAS Giannina	6	2	1	3	6	8	−2	7		1–2	1–1	2–1	

Source: Superleague Greece: Standings and Schedule
Rules for classification: 1) points; 2) head-to-head points; 3) head-to-head goal difference; 4) classification of regular season
