= 2008–09 AFC Bournemouth season =

AFC Bournemouth
2008–09 season
- Manager: Jimmy Quinn/Eddie Howe
- Stadium: Dean Court
- League Two: 21st
- FA Cup: Second round
- League Cup: First round
- Football League Trophy: Quarter-finals
- Top goalscorer: League: Brett Pitman (17); All: Brett Pitman (17)

== Results ==
Bournemouth's score comes first

=== Legend ===
Win	Draw	Loss

=== Football League Two ===
Match	Date	Opponent	Venue	Result	Attendance	Scorers
1	9 August 2008	Gillingham	H	1–1	5,377	Anderton 42
2	16 August 2008	Aldershot Town	A	1–1	4,564	Sappleton 81
3	23 August 2008	Exeter City	H	0–1	5,350	
4	30 August 2008	Port Vale	A	1–3	6,048	Lindfield 58
5	6 September 2008	Notts County	A	1–1	4,362	Pitman 19
6	13 September 2008	Macclesfield Town	H	0–1	3,922	
7	20 September 2008	Bradford City	A	3–1	12,824	Hollands 39, Goulding 54, Pearce 70
8	27 September 2008	Darlington	H	3–1	4,124	Bartley 15, Austin (og) 37, Pitman 90
9	4 October 2008	Wycombe Wanderers	A	1–3	5,005	Hollands 57
10	11 October 2008	Rotherham United	H	0–0	4,530	
11	18 October 2008	Shrewsbury Town	A	1–4	5,738	Pitman 60
12	21 October 2008	Dagenham & Redbridge	H	2–1	3,554	Bradbury 24, Pitman 31
13	25 October 2008	Lincoln City	H	0–1	4,464	
14	1 November 2008	Chesterfield	H	1–1	4,082	Goodall (og) 82
15	15 November 2008	Accrington Stanley	A	0–3	1,152	
16	21 November 2008	Grimsby Town	A	3–3	4,353	Bradbury 6, 89, Anderton 79
17	25 November 2008	Morecambe	H	0–0	3,068	
18	2 December 2008	Luton Town	A	3–3	6,773	Molesley 20, 51, Tubbs 76
19	6 December 2008	Chester City	H	1–0	4,154	Anderton 88
20	13 December 2008	Rochdale	A	1–1	2,285	Bradbury (p) 45
21	20 December 2008	Bury	H	2–0	3,479	Igoe 39, Partington 44
22	26 December 2008	Brentford	A	0–2	6,450	
23	28 December 2008	Barnet	H	0–2	4,725	
24	3 January 2009	Darlington	A	1–2	2,571	Hollands 29
25	17 January 2009	Rotherham United	A	0–1	3,270	
26	24 January 2009	Wycombe Wanderers	H	3–1	5,946	Pitman 24, Pearce 32, Thomson 64
27	27 January 2009	Luton Town	H	1–1	5,230	Hollands 29
28	31 January 2009	Lincoln City	A	3–3	3,634	Molesley 36, Pitman (p) 65, (p) 77
29	7 February 2009	Shrewsbury Town	H	1–0	4,187	Pitman 23
30	14 February 2009	Accrington Stanley	H	1–0	4,109	Pitman 86
31	20 February 2009	Chesterfield	A	0–1	3,130	
32	24 February 2009	Dagenham & Redbridge	A	1–0	1,602	Molesley 90
33	28 February 2009	Gillingham	A	0–1	5,353	
34	3 March 2009	Aldershot Town	H	2–0	4,556	Hollands 39, Fletcher 56
35	7 March 2009	Port Vale	H	0–0	5,924	
36	10 March 2009	Exeter City	A	3–1	4,946	Hollands 56, Pitman 59, 87
37	14 March 2009	Macclesfield Town	A	2–0	1,589	Bradbury 50, 70
38	17 March 2009	Bradford City	H	4–1	4,847	Fletcher 4, 39, Goulding 40, 51
39	21 March 2009	Notts County	H	0–1	5,510	
40	28 March 2009	Bury	A	0–1	2,762	
41	5 April 2009	Rochdale	H	4–0	5,092	Pitman 12, 67, 90, Feeney 25
42	11 April 2009	Barnet	A	0–1	3,133	
43	13 April 2009	Brentford	H	0–1	8,168	
44	18 April 2009	Chester City	A	2–0	3,349	Pitman 3, Robinson 79
45	25 April 2009	Grimsby Town	H	2–1	9,008	Feeney 47, Fletcher 80
46	2 May 2009	Morecambe	A	4–0	2,601	Ward 7, Feeney 36, Pitman 43, 69

=== FA Cup ===
Match	Date	Opponent	Venue	Result	Attendance	Scorers
R1	8 November 2008	Bristol Rovers	H	1–0	3,935	Pearce 76
R2	29 November 2008	Blyth Spartans	H	0–0	4,165	
R2 - Replay	16 December 2008	Blyth Spartans	A	0–1 (a.e.t.)	4,040	

=== Football League Cup ===
Match	Date	Opponent	Venue	Result	Attendance	Scorers
R1	12 August 2008	Cardiff City	H	1–2	3,399	Kuffour 28

=== Football League Trophy ===
Match	Date	Opponent	Venue	Result	Attendance	Scorers
R1	2 September 2008	Bristol Rovers	H	3–0	2,220	Goulding 38, Igoe 67, Hollands 76
R2	7 October 2008	MK Dons	A	1–0	4,329	Anderton 77
QF	4 November 2008	Colchester United	H	0–1	2,275	

== Squad ==
Squad at end of season

Note: Flags indicate national team as defined under FIFA eligibility rules; some limited exceptions apply. Players may hold more than one non-FIFA nationality.

No.	Pos.	Nation	Player
1	GK	ENG	Shwan Jalal
2	DF	AUS	Scott Guyett
3	DF	ENG	Ryan Garry
4	DF	ENG	Shaun Cooper
5	DF	ENG	Jason Pearce
6	MF	ENG	Marvin Bartley
7	MF	ENG	Sammy Igoe
9	FW	Jersey	Brett Pitman
10	FW	ENG	Alan Connell
11	MF	ENG	Liam Feeney
13	GK	ENG	Ryan Pryce
14	MF	ENG	Danny Hollands
15	DF	ENG	Joel Ward (on loan from Portsmouth)
16	FW	ENG	Jeff Goulding

No.	Pos.	Nation	Player
17	FW	ENG	Josh McQuoid
18	DF	WAL	Rhoys Wiggins (on loan from Crystal Palace)
20	MF	ENG	Mark Molesley
20	MF	ENG	Anton Robinson
22	MF	ENG	Joe Partington
23	FW	ENG	Lee Bradbury
24	DF	ENG	George Webb
25	MF	ENG	Steve Hutchings
28	DF	SCO	Warren Cummings
29	MF	ENG	Carl Preston
31	DF	ENG	Jason Tindall
33	FW	ENG	Steve Fletcher

=== Left club during season ===
Note: Flags indicate national team as defined under FIFA eligibility rules; some limited exceptions apply. Players may hold more than one non-FIFA nationality.

No.	Pos.	Nation	Player
10	FW	ENG	Jo Kuffour (joined Bristol Rovers on 29 August 2008)
16	MF	ENG	Carl Pettefer (joined Bognor Regis Town)
11	MF	ENG	Scott Wagstaff (on loan from Charlton Athletic)
26	FW	JAM	Ricky Sappleton (on loan from Leicester City)
21	FW	SCO	Blair Sturrock (on loan from Swindon Town)
11	FW	ENG	Michael Rankine (on loan from Rushden & Diamonds)

No.	Pos.	Nation	Player
8	MF	ENG	Darren Anderton (retired on 7 December 2008)
18	FW	ENG	Michael Symes (on loan from Shrewsbury Town)
19	FW	ENG	Matt Tubbs (on loan from Salisbury City)
12	FW	ENG	Craig Lindfield (on loan from Liverpool)
12	GK	ENG	David Button (on loan from Tottenham Hotspur)
18	MF	ENG	Jake Thomson (on loan from Southampton)
