= Andy Gosney =

English footballer

Personal information
- Full name: Andrew Robert Gosney
- Date of birth: 8 November 1963 (age 62)
- Place of birth: Southampton, England
- Height: 6 ft 4 in (1.93 m)
- Position: Goalkeeper

Youth career
- 1979–1981: Portsmouth

Senior career*
Years	Team	Apps	(Gls)
1981–1992	Portsmouth	48	(0)
1991	→ York City (loan)	5	(0)
1992–1993	Birmingham City	21	(0)
1993	Exeter City	1	(0)
Total		70	(0)

International career
1981	England Youth	4	(0)
1981	England U20	1	(0)
- * Club domestic league appearances and goals

Andrew Robert Gosney (born 8 November 1963) is an English former professional footballer who played as a goalkeeper. He made 70 appearances in the Football League playing for Portsmouth, York City, Birmingham City and Exeter City. He represented England at youth level.

== Career ==
Gosney was born in Southampton, Hampshire, and began his football career as an apprentice with Portsmouth in 1979. He turned professional in November 1981, but never established himself as first choice for the club because of the consistency of Alan Knight. Over a 13-year career with the club Gosney made only 60 first-team appearances in all competitions. He spent a month on loan at York City in 1991 before eventually leaving Portsmouth to join Birmingham City at the start of the 1992–93 season. After one unsuccessful season with Birmingham, at the end of which the club brought in Kevin Miller from Exeter City to replace him, Gosney moved in the opposite direction. He was stretchered off during his only appearance for Exeter, a 6–4 home defeat to Reading, with an injury that ended his career.

Gosney was credited by Anderton himself as the man who gave Darren Anderton the "Sicknote" nickname.
