= Jermaine Pennant =

English footballer (born 1983)

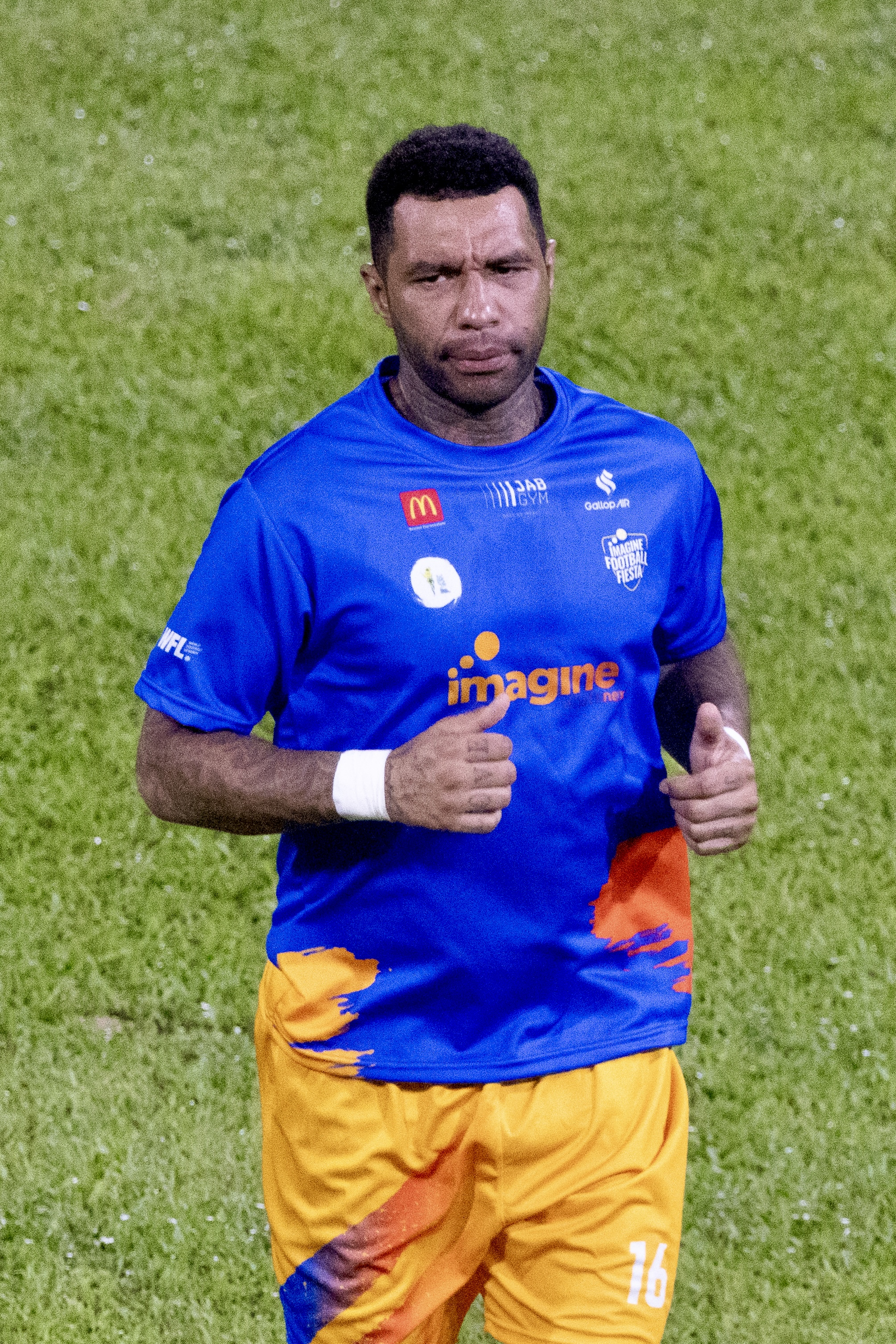
- Pennant in 2024

Personal information
- Full name: Jermaine Lloyd Pennant
- Date of birth: 15 January 1983 (age 43)
- Place of birth: Nottingham, England
- Height: 5 ft 8 in (1.73 m)
- Position: Winger

Youth career
- 1993–1998: Notts County

Senior career*
Years	Team	Apps	(Gls)
1998–1999	Notts County	0	(0)
1999–2005	Arsenal	12	(3)
2002	→ Watford (loan)	9	(2)
2002–2003	→ Watford (loan)	12	(0)
2003–2004	→ Leeds United (loan)	36	(2)
2005	→ Birmingham City (loan)	12	(0)
2005–2006	Birmingham City	38	(2)
2006–2009	Liverpool	55	(3)
2009	→ Portsmouth (loan)	13	(0)
2009–2010	Real Zaragoza	25	(0)
2010	→ Stoke City (loan)	13	(0)
2011–2014	Stoke City	52	(4)
2012–2013	→ Wolverhampton Wanderers (loan)	15	(0)
2014	Pune City	7	(0)
2015	Wigan Athletic	13	(3)
2016	Tampines Rovers	21	(5)
2017	Bury	7	(0)
2017	Billericay Town	13	(1)
Total		353	(25)

International career
2001–2004	England U21	24	(0)
- * Club domestic league appearances and goals

Jermaine Lloyd Pennant (born 15 January 1983) is an English retired professional footballer who played as a winger. Pennant made over 350 league appearances for 15 clubs, and scored 25 league goals.

Born in Nottingham, Pennant played for his local side Notts County as a teenager. He earned promising reviews in the youth team at County and Arsenal signed him in 1999. He struggled to make much of an impact at the North London club and spent time on loan at Watford, Leeds United and Birmingham City before joining the latter permanently. While an Arsenal player, he won 24 caps for the England under-21 team. He gained notoriety in 2005, when he had to play a match while on probation – he played while wearing an electronic tag following a drink-driving conviction. Following Birmingham's relegation in 2006, Pennant signed for Liverpool for a fee of £6.7 million. He won the 2006 FA Community Shield and also played a vital role in the club's run to the 2007 UEFA Champions League Final, where Liverpool lost 2–1 to AC Milan.

However, off-field problems continued to affect Pennant and consequently led to him being left out of the side. He joined Portsmouth on loan before leaving to join Spanish side Real Zaragoza in 2009. His time in Spain was overshadowed by disciplinary problems. He returned to the Premier League for the 2010–11 season signing on loan at Midlands club Stoke City. Following a successful loan spell, he signed a permanent contract at Stoke in December 2010. He played in the 2011 FA Cup Final, Stoke losing 1–0 to Manchester City, and also played in the UEFA Europa League the following season. Pennant fell out of favour with Tony Pulis in 2012–13 and spent time out on loan at Wolverhampton Wanderers. With his Stoke career looking to be coming to an end, new manager Mark Hughes gave Pennant a new contract. However, after failing to make an impact, he left Stoke in January 2014. He then spent time playing in India with Pune City before returning to England to sign a short-term contract with Wigan Athletic. In January 2016, he signed a one-year deal with Singapore S.League club Tampines Rovers. Pennant returned to England once more signing for EFL League Two side Bury, before retiring in non-league football with Billericay Town in 2017.

== Early years ==
Pennant was born in The Meadows area of Nottingham. His father Gary was a semi-professional footballer who inspired Pennant to play. Pennant recalls how as a child his favourite toy was a football and how it rarely left his side.

Pennant, who grew up in a crime and drug-infested neighbourhood, credits football for saving him from a life of crime. When he was 14, he moved away from home and was living with Youth Training Scheme players who were 16, 17 and 18.

== Club career ==
=== Arsenal ===
Pennant was signed at age 15 by Arsenal from Notts County for £2 million, a record transfer fee for a trainee at the time.

Pennant's career seemed promising following his move to Arsenal. He made his debut aged 16 years and 319 days against Middlesbrough in the League Cup on 30 November 1999, making him Arsenal's youngest-ever first team player, surpassing Gerry Ward's long-standing record by two days; Pennant's record has since been surpassed by Cesc Fàbregas. He continued to make League Cup appearances over the next few seasons, but had to wait 2 1/2 years for his league debut, as a substitute against West Ham United on 24 August 2002 in the Premier League.

At first, Pennant became homesick. After that subsided, he began to get sick from not playing. It affected him greatly. He played for Arsenal for seven years and only made five starts, including a hat-trick on his full league debut against Southampton on 7 May 2003. He said in 2018 that he did not expect to start that match, and had been drinking until 6 in the morning the night before. However, these were also his only Arsenal league goals and he did not manage to secure a regular place in an Arsenal side that went on a run of 49 consecutive games without defeat. Arsenal manager Arsène Wenger appeared to have eventually lost patience with Pennant, who had a history of turning up late to training. Between 2002 and 2004, Pennant spent time on loan at Watford and Leeds United. Pennant received regular first-team action at Leeds, who were relegated at the conclusion of the 2003–04 season.

=== Birmingham City ===
Pennant was loaned to Birmingham City for the second half of the 2004–05 season. He made a good start at St Andrew's, providing Walter Pandiani with the winning goal against Southampton on his debut. Pennant then stated he wanted to make his loan move permanent. On 1 March 2005, he was arrested and convicted for drink-driving, driving while disqualified and driving without insurance. He was handed a three-month prison sentence by the courts. Despite this, Birmingham manager Steve Bruce and chairman David Gold vowed to stand by Pennant once his sentence was over. He was released from prison after serving 30 days and wore an electronic tag in a match against Tottenham Hotspur.

Pennant signed a permanent contract with Birmingham on 25 April 2005 for a fee of £3 million. He again struggled with discipline problems in 2005–06 as the club battled against relegation. Ultimately, Birmingham were relegated to the Championship after they drew 0–0 with Newcastle United. Following Birmingham's relegation, Liverpool made a bid for Pennant.

=== Liverpool ===
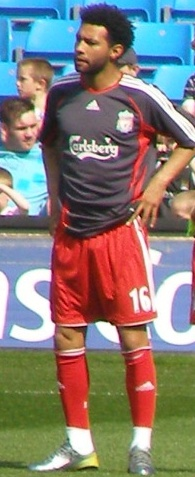
Pennant playing for Liverpool in 2007

On 26 July 2006, Pennant signed for Liverpool on a four-year contract for a £6.7 million transfer fee, potentially rising to £8 million with add-ons. After impressing in pre-season, Pennant made his Liverpool debut against Maccabi Haifa in a UEFA Champions League third round qualifying match at Anfield, where he went on to win the fans' Star Man award. On 20 January 2007, he scored his first goal for Liverpool in their 2–0 home victory over Chelsea in the Premier League. On 31 March, Pennant participated in a 4–1 win against his former club Arsenal. After not being chosen for the England squad to play Israel and Andorra in March 2007, Pennant expressed the lack of recognition from England manager Steve McClaren as "frustrating".

Pennant started the 2007–08 season in good form, putting in strong performances on either flank as Liverpool reached the top of the Premier League table in the first month. However, he was again ignored by McClaren for the England team in their European Championship qualifying matches against Israel and Russia, despite the backing of Liverpool manager Rafael Benítez. As Liverpool struggled to regain their early season form following the international break, Pennant too could not maintain his form.

On 18 September 2007, Pennant was sent off against Porto in Liverpool's opening UEFA Champions League match of the season.

In January 2009, Pennant was loaned out to Portsmouth, where he spent the second half of the 2008–09 season. He played 13 league matches for Portsmouth without scoring a goal. Pennant was not offered a new contract by Liverpool following his return, and he subsequently became a free agent when his contract expired on 1 July 2009.

=== Real Zaragoza ===
On 9 July 2009, Pennant passed a medical and signed a three-year deal at Real Zaragoza. He made his La Liga debut on the first matchday of the season, playing 71 minutes in Zaragoza's 1–0 win over Tenerife. On 24 February 2010, he was reprimanded by coach José Aurelio Gay after turning up late for training three times in the space of two weeks; he was sent home on the third occasion and disciplined. He never played for Real Zaragoza again.

=== Stoke City ===
On 31 August 2010, the final day of the summer transfer window, Pennant agreed a four-month loan deal with Premier League side Stoke City. He made his Stoke debut as a substitute in the home match against Aston Villa on 13 September 2010. Manager Tony Pulis indicated he would look to make Pennant's loan switch permanent in the January transfer window. Pennant also expressed his desire to stay at Stoke after his loan spell.

Pennant joined Stoke on a permanent transfer on 29 December 2010, signing a two-and-a-half-year contract for an initial fee of £1.725 million which could eventually rise to £2.8 million.

"I think everyone knows how I feel about being at this football club. The supporters, players and management have been absolutely fantastic to me over these past four months and I desperately wanted to stay here because I love it so much. I know I have only been here a few months, but it really does feel like I have been here for years. The atmosphere around the place is brilliant, so I am looking forward to the fact that I am here at Stoke now for the long term and back in the best league in the world."

— Pennant on his permanent transfer to Stoke City.

Following his transfer, Pulis stated that Pennant must not become complacent. He scored his first goal for Stoke in a 4–0 win over Newcastle United in March 2011, contributed an assist in their 5–0 defeat of Bolton Wanderers in the FA Cup semi-final, and scored his second goal of the season as they defeated Wolverhampton Wanderers 3–0 a week later. He also scored against his former club Arsenal. Pennant played in the 2011 FA Cup Final as Stoke lost 1–0 to Manchester City.

Pennant was handed the number 7 shirt prior to the start of the 2011–12 season. However, he reverted to number 16 as a large number of fans had already purchased a replica shirt with his name and old number. Pennant went on to have an up-and-down season as he played in 40 of the club's 59 fixtures (starting in 23), helping the side reach the round of 32 of the UEFA Europa League and the quarter-final of the FA Cup. But off-the-pitch problems dominated Pennant's season as he broke a club curfew twice, before matches against Everton and Crawley Town. This led to speculation over his future at the club, but Pennant insisted he was not looking to leave the Britannia Stadium.

However, with the arrival of Wolverhampton Wanderers winger Michael Kightly, Pennant was unable to force his way back into Tony Pulis' plans, and on 12 October 2012, he moved to Wolves on an emergency three-month loan deal. He did not have the best of spells at Molineux, making just ten starts and was jeered by some of the Wolves support for some poor performances, and returned to Stoke in January 2013. After returning to Stoke, Pennant found himself out of the first team and looked to be leaving at the end of the 2012–13 season after the deadline for an appearances-related contract extension expired, and he was included on Stoke's released list. However, new Stoke manager Mark Hughes offered Pennant a one-year contract, which he accepted.

Pennant returned to the side for the 2013–14 season, and on 31 August 2013, he scored a free-kick against West Ham United in a 1–0 victory. However, after making little impact under Hughes, his contract was terminated on 24 January 2014.

=== Pune City ===
On 6 November 2014, Pennant joined Indian Super League side Pune City. He played seven times for Pune as they finished in sixth position.

=== Wigan Athletic ===
Pennant returned to England and joined Championship club Wigan Athletic on 21 February 2015 until the end of the season on a free transfer. He played 13 times and scored three goals, all of which were free-kicks, but was unable to help prevent Wigan suffering relegation to the third tier. He was offered a new contract with the club, but chose not to accept.

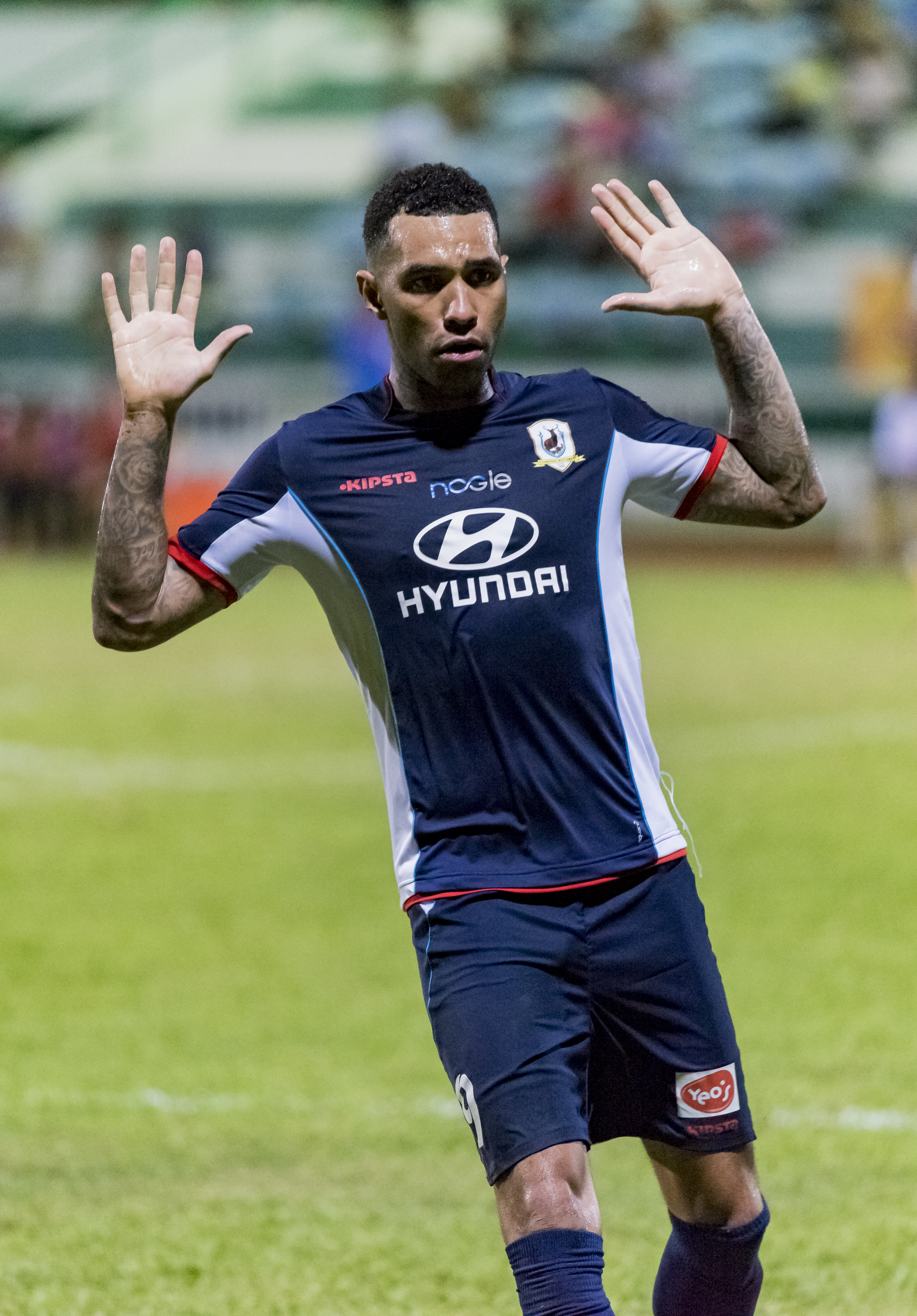
Pennant with Tampines Rovers in 2016

=== Tampines Rovers ===
After failing a trial with Thailand club Muangthong United, Pennant had a trial in January 2016 with the Singapore-based Tampines Rovers, which led to a 12-month contract. According to the local media, he was to take a 70% pay cut from his salary at Wigan. On 26 February 2016, he scored his first goal in a friendly match against Hougang United from a free-kick. Pennant went on to score against Home United and against Warriors.

=== Bury ===
Pennant returned to English football in January 2017 on a short-term contract with League One club Bury.

=== Billericay Town and retirement ===
Pennant had a trial spell with Scottish Premiership club Hibernian during July 2017, but the club decided against offering him a contract.

He then signed a two-year deal with Isthmian League Premier Division side Billericay Town. On 28 December 2017, Pennant left Billericay Town, after just four months, having made 13 appearances league (1 goal) and 2 in the FA Cup.

After failing to find a new club upon leaving Billericay, Pennant subsequently retired.

== International career ==
While on the England under-21 team, Pennant was sent home by head coach David Platt for breaking a curfew before an important match against Turkey. He later apologised for his actions. He was also sent off for punching Niko Kranjčar in a match against the Croatia under-21s. However, he did manage to make 24 appearances for the U21s in total, making him one of the ten most-capped Englishmen at this level.

Despite being of Jamaican and Irish descent, he opted to represent England internationally; although he played at under-21 level, he did not play for the senior team. In March 2011, Pennant revealed that though he would still "love to play for England", he had made the Football Association of Ireland aware he was interested in representing the Republic of Ireland, saying, "If I've got a chance to play international football with Ireland, I'm going to take it with both hands."

Pennant is one of only two English players to have played in a UEFA Champions League Final, but never to have represented England at senior level, the other being Jamie Gittens.

== Style of play ==
Pennant played as a right winger. He had been described by former Newcastle United left-back José Enrique as a player with similar style to that of Aaron Lennon and Theo Walcott. Pennant was also able to use skill to beat opponents' full backs.

== Personal life ==
In February 2004, Pennant was given a 16-month driving ban after being caught drink-driving in Paddington, West London. On 23 January 2005, he was arrested and again charged with drink-driving, and driving while uninsured, after crashing his Mercedes into a lamp-post in Aylesbury while still serving the ban for the first offence. During questioning, Pennant initially identified himself as his friend Ashley Cole. Pennant pleaded guilty to drink-driving and driving while disqualified, and was sentenced to 90 days in prison on 1 March. He was released on parole after 30 days and immediately returned to playing for Birmingham City, although he had to wear an electronic tag at all times, including while on the pitch. It emerged during the trial that he was illiterate.

In January 2011, Pennant's Porsche Turbo with his personal number plate was found abandoned at a railway station in Zaragoza with five months' worth of parking tickets. He was reported to have forgotten he owned the car. In April 2012, Pennant was arrested for drink driving, driving while disqualified and without insurance after being involved in a traffic collision. The following month, he was banned from driving for three years and given an eight-week jail sentence, suspended for a year.

In 2007, Pennant began dating glamour model Amii Grove. Following a domestic disturbance in July 2007, he was arrested for a Section 5 public order offence – using words or behaviour likely to cause distress – for which he had to pay a fixed penalty fine. According to Grove, she ended the relationship upon finding CCTV footage of Pennant cheating, and "took revenge by destroying £200,000 of his designer gear". In December 2008, Pennant's front gates at his home in Cheshire were ram-raided by burglars in an attempted robbery.

Until January 2008, Pennant was dating Hollyoaks actress Jennifer Metcalfe. In October 2008, he reunited with former girlfriend Amii Grove following the death of her brother and became engaged. Soon afterwards, Pennant's father Gary was convicted on drug dealing charges and sentenced to four years imprisonment. In early 2009, Pennant and Grove broke up and Pennant began dating Metcalfe again.

In May 2010, Pennant became engaged to Lara Murphy, with whom he had a son named Trey who was born in August 2010. The relationship with Murphy ended when his son was one year old, when Pennant left her for glamour model Alice Goodwin. He married Goodwin in May 2014. In October 2018, the couple appeared on The Jeremy Kyle Show, with an appearance on comedy gameshow Your Face or Mine? following in 2019.

Pennant's autobiography, Mental: Bad Behaviour, Ugly Truths and the Beautiful Game, was released in 2018. In the same year, he was a contestant on Celebrity Big Brother.

For Season Two of the Apple TV series Ted Lasso, assistant director Sophie Worger hired former professional player Kasali Casal to manage the soccer choreography. Casal enlisted a team of former professional players to play for the opposition teams facing AFC Richmond during game scenes, these included Pennant and fellow former Premier League players and Lee Hendrie, Jay Bothroyd and George Elokobi.

Since his retirement, Pennant has worked as a pundit, and can often be heard on Talksport. In October 2026, he required more than fifty stitches in his leg after being attacked by a German Shepherd in North London.

== Career statistics ==
Appearances and goals by club, season and competition
Club	Season	League			National Cup		League Cup		Other		Total	
Club	Season	Division	Apps	Goals	Apps	Goals	Apps	Goals	Apps	Goals	Apps	Goals
Notts County	1998–99	Second Division	0	0	1	0	0	0	1 (Note: Appearance in Football League Trophy)	0	2	0
Arsenal	1999–2000	Premier League	0	0	0	0	1	0	0	0	1	0
Arsenal	2000–01	Premier League	0	0	0	0	1	0	0	0	1	0
Arsenal	2001–02	Premier League	0	0	0	0	3	0	2 (Note: Appearances in UEFA Champions League)	0	5	0
Arsenal	2002–03	Premier League	5	3	—		1	0	1	0	7	3
Arsenal	2003–04	Premier League	0	0	—		—		0	0	0	0
Arsenal	2004–05	Premier League	7	0	1	0	3	0	1 (Note: Appearance in FA Community Shield)	0	12	0
Arsenal	Total		12	3	1	0	9	0	4	0	26	3
Watford (loan)	2001–02	First Division	9	2	—		—		—		9	2
Watford (loan)	2002–03	First Division	12	0	2	1	—		—		14	1
Watford (loan)	Total		21	2	2	1	—		—		23	3
Leeds United (loan)	2003–04	Premier League	36	2	0	0	0	0	—		36	2
Birmingham City	2004–05	Premier League	12	0	—		—		—		12	0
Birmingham City	2005–06	Premier League	38	2	6	0	4	1	—		48	3
Birmingham City	Total		50	2	6	0	4	1	—		60	3
Liverpool	2006–07	Premier League	34	1	1	0	2	0	15 (Note: Fourteen appearances in UEFA Champions League, one in FA Community Shield)	0	52	1
Liverpool	2007–08	Premier League	18	2	2	0	0	0	5	0	25	2
Liverpool	2008–09	Premier League	3	0	0	0	1	0	0	0	4	0
Liverpool	Total		55	3	3	0	3	0	20	0	81	3
Portsmouth (loan)	2008–09	Premier League	13	0	1	0	—		—		14	0
Real Zaragoza	2009–10	La Liga	25	0	1	0	—		—		26	0
Stoke City	2010–11	Premier League	29	3	6	0	1	0	—		36	3
Stoke City	2011–12	Premier League	27	0	2	0	2	0	9 (Note: Appearances in UEFA Europa League)	0	40	0
Stoke City	2012–13	Premier League	1	0	0	0	1	0	—		2	0
Stoke City	2013–14	Premier League	8	1	0	0	3	0	—		11	1
Stoke City	Total		65	4	8	0	7	0	9	0	89	4
Wolverhampton Wanderers (loan)	2012–13	Championship	15	0	0	0	0	0	—		15	0
FC Pune City	2014	Indian Super League	7	0	—		—		—		7	0
Wigan Athletic	2014–15	Championship	13	3	—		—		—		13	3
Tampines Rovers	2016	S.League	21	5	5	0	0	0	8 (Note: Appearances in AFC Cup)	0	34	5
Bury	2016–17	League One	7	0	—		—		—		7	0
Billericay Town	2017–18	Isthmian League Premier Division	13	1	2	0	—		—		15	1
Career total			353	25	30	1	23	1	42	0	448	27

== Honours ==
Arsenal Youth

- FA Youth Cup: 1999–2000, 2000–01

Arsenal

- FA Community Shield: 2004

Liverpool

- FA Community Shield: 2006
- UEFA Champions League runner-up: 2006–07

Stoke City

- FA Cup runner-up: 2010–11

Tampines Rovers

- Singapore Cup runner-up: 2016

Billericay Town

- Isthmian League Premier Division: 2017–18
- Alan Turvey Trophy: 2017–18
