= 2016 Tampines Rovers FC season =

Tampines Rovers FC
2016 season
- Chairman: (Singapore) Desmond Ong
- Coach: (Singapore) V. Sundramoorthy
- Ground: Jurong West Stadium
Home colours	Away colours

The 2016 S.League season is Tampines Rovers's 21st season at the top level of Singapore football and 71st year in existence as a football club. The club also competed in the Singapore League Cup, Singapore Cup, Singapore Community Shield and the AFC Cup.

== Squad ==
=== Sleague Squad ===
As of 4 May 2017.

No.	Name	Nationality	Date of Birth (Age)	Last club	Contract Since	Contract End
Goalkeepers
1	Izwan Mahbud	(Singapore)	14 July 1990 (age 36)	(Singapore) LionsXII	2016	
21	Joey Sim	(Singapore)	2 March 1987 (age 39)	(Singapore) Geylang International	2015	
26	Ahmad Fadly	(Singapore)	1 March 1997 (age 29)	Youth Team	2016	
44	Haikal Hasnol	(Singapore)	4 November 1995 (age 31)	Youth Team	2016	
Defenders
2	Ismadi Mukhtar	(Singapore)	16 December 1983 (age 42)	(Singapore) Woodlands Wellington	2010	
3	Jufri Taha	(Singapore)	4 March 1985 (age 41)	(Singapore) Balestier Khalsa	2010	
4	Fahrudin Mustafic	(Singapore) (Serbia)	17 April 1981 (age 45)	(Indonesia) Persela Lamongan	2011	
5	Noh Rahman	(Singapore)	2 August 1980 (age 46)	(Singapore) Home United	2016	
14	Afiq Yunos	(Singapore)	10 December 1990 (age 35)	(Singapore) LionsXII	2016	
17	Shakir Hamzah	(Singapore)	10 October 1992 (age 34)	(Singapore) LionsXII	2016	2017
19	Irwan Shah	(Singapore)	2 November 1988 (age 38)	(Singapore) Warriors FC	2016	
20	Kwon Jun	(South Korea)	12 October 1987 (age 39)	(Malaysia) Putrajaya SPA F.C.	2016	
32	Ariyan Shamsuddin	(Singapore)	28 August 1997 (age 29)	Youth Team	2016	
Midfielders
6	Yasir Hanapi	(Singapore)	21 June 1989 (age 37)	(Singapore) Home United	2016	
7	Christopher van Huizen	(Singapore)	28 November 1992 (age 33)	(Singapore) LionsXII	2016	
8	Shahdan Sulaiman	(Singapore)	9 May 1988 (age 38)	(Singapore) LionsXII	2016	2017
9	Jermaine Pennant	(England)	15 January 1983 (age 43)	(England) Wigan Athletic F.C.	2016	
12	Fabian Kwok	(Singapore)	17 March 1989 (age 37)	(Singapore) Geylang International	2015	
13	Izzdin Shafiq	(Singapore)	14 December 1990 (age 35)	(Singapore) LionsXII	2016	
15	Nawari Ahmad	(Singapore)	15 February 1992 (age 34)	Youth Team	2016	
16	Hafiz Sujad	(Singapore)	1 November 1990 (age 36)	(Singapore) LionsXII	2016	
30	Aide Shazwandi	(Singapore)	13 January 1997 (age 29)	Youth Team	2016	
38	Gautam Selvamany	(Singapore)	10 November 1996 (age 30)	Youth Team	2016	
43	Saifullah Akbar	(Singapore)	31 January 1999 (age 27)	Youth Team	2016	
Forwards
10	Fazrul Nawaz	(Singapore)	17 April 1985 (age 41)	(Singapore) Warriors FC	2016	
11	Jordan Webb	(Canada)	24 March 1988 (age 38)	(Singapore) Courts Young Lions	2016	
18	Sufian Anuar	(Singapore)	28 August 1987 (age 39)	(Singapore) LionsXII	2016	
25	Billy Mehmet	(England)	3 January 1985 (age 41)	(Malaysia) Sarawak FA	2016	
29	Diego Silvas	(United States)	25 September 1997 (age 29)	(United States) Seattle Sounders FC 2	2016	
33	Noor Faridzuan	(Singapore)	7 January 1996 (age 30)	Youth Team	2016	

== Coaching staff ==
Position	Name	Ref.
Head coach	(Germany) Jürgen Raab	
Assistant coach	(Singapore) Herman Zailani	
Goalkeeping coach	(Singapore) Rameshpal Singh	
Team manager	(Singapore) Desmund Khusnin	
Physiotherapist		
Kitman	(Singapore) Goh Koon Hiang	
Director of Football	(Singapore) Jita Singh	

== Transfers ==
=== Pre-season transfers ===
==== In ====
Position	Player	Transferred From	Ref
GK	(Singapore) Izwan Mahbud	(Singapore) LionsXII	
DF	(Singapore) Hafiz Abu Sujad	(Singapore) LionsXII	
DF	(Singapore) Afiq Yunos	(Singapore) LionsXII	
DF	(Singapore) Shakir Hamzah	(Singapore) LionsXII	
DF	(Singapore) Irwan Shah	(Singapore) Warriors FC	
DF	(Singapore) Noh Rahman	(Singapore) Home United	
DF	(South Korea) Kwon Jun	(Malaysia) Putrajaya SPA F.C.	
MF	(Singapore) Yasir Hanapi	(Singapore) Home United	
MF	(Singapore) Izzdin Shafiq	(Singapore) LionsXII	
MF	(Singapore) Firdaus Kasman	(Singapore) LionsXII	
MF	(Singapore) Christopher van Huizen	(Singapore) LionsXII	
MF	(Singapore) Shahdan Sulaiman	(Singapore) LionsXII	
MF	(England) Jermaine Pennant	(England) Wigan Athletic F.C.	
FW	(Singapore) Sufian Anuar	(Singapore) LionsXII	
FW	(Singapore) Fazrul Nawaz	(Singapore) Warriors FC	
FW	(Canada) Jordan Webb	(Singapore) Courts Young Lions	
FW	(England) Billy Mehmet	(Malaysia) Sarawak FA	
FW	(United States) Diego Silvas	(United States) Seattle Sounders FC 2	

==== Retained ====
Position	Player	Ref
GK	(Singapore) Joey Sim	
DF	(Singapore) Mustafic Fahrudin	
DF	(Singapore) Ismadi Mukhtar	
DF	(Singapore) Jufri Taha	
MF	(Singapore) Fabian Kwok	

==== Out ====
Position	Player	Transferred To	Ref
GK	(Singapore) Siddiq Durimi		
GK	(Brazil) Rodrigo Pacheco		
DF	(Croatia) Predrag Počuča	(Serbia) FK BSK Borča	
DF	(Singapore) Shaiful Esah	(Singapore) Warriors FC	
DF	(Singapore) Zulfadli Zainal Abidin	(Singapore) Warriors FC	
DF	(Singapore) Ismail Yunos	(Singapore) Warriors FC	
DF	(Singapore) Aqhari Abdullah	(Singapore) Home United	
MF	(Singapore) Jamil Ali	(Singapore) Balestier Khalsa	
MF	(Singapore) Firdaus Idros		
MF	(Singapore) Ridhuan Muhammad	(Singapore) Warriors FC	
MF	(Croatia) Robert Alviž	(Croatia) HNK Šibenik	
MF	(Australia) Mohammad Naeem Rahimi	(Australia) Bankstown Berries FC	
MF	(Singapore) Isa Halim	(Singapore) Geylang International	
FW	(Croatia) Mateo Roskam	(Malaysia) Sarawak FA	
FW	(Brazil) Rodrigo Tosi	(Indonesia) Persija Jakarta	
FW	(Singapore) Indra Sahdan Daud	(Singapore) Geylang International	
FW	(Singapore) Noh Alam Shah		

=== Trial ===
Position	Player	From	Ref

== Friendlies ==
=== Pre-season friendlies ===
Win Draw Loss

== Team statistics ==
=== Appearances and goals ===
No.	Pos.	Player	Sleague		Singapore Cup		League Cup		AFC Cup		Total	
No.	Pos.	Player	Apps.	Goals	Apps.	Goals	Apps.	Goals	Apps.	Goals	Apps.	Goals
1	GK	(Singapore) Izwan Mahbud	18	0	2	0	0	0	9	0	29	0
2	DF	(Singapore) Ismadi Mukhtar	13(4)	1	2	0	4	0	4(3)	0	30	1
3	DF	(Singapore) Jufri Taha	11	0	3	0	4	0	2	0	20	0
4	DF	(Singapore) Fahrudin Mustafic	18(3)	1	4	1	1	0	7(1)	1	34	3
5	DF	(Singapore) Noh Rahman	6	0	0	0	4	0	7	0	17	0
6	MF	(Singapore) Yasir Hanapi	20(2)	3	2(1)	0	0	0	10	1	35	4
7	MF	(Singapore) Christopher van Huizen	5(5)	1	1(1)	0	0	0	3(1)	0	16	1
8	MF	(Singapore) Shahdan Sulaiman	11(2)	2	0	0	1	1	4(2)	0	20	3
9	MF	(England) Jermaine Pennant	15(6)	5	2(2)	0	0	0	6(1)	0	32	5
10	FW	(Singapore) Fazrul Nawaz	15(3)	7	2	1	0	0	5(1)	1	26	9
11	FW	(Canada) Jordan Webb	22(2)	12	3	0	4	1	7(3)	1	41	14
12	MF	(Singapore) Fabian Kwok	5(4)	0	0(1)	0	4	1	2(2)	0	17	1
13	MF	(Singapore) Izzdin Shafiq	20(4)	0	3	0	0	0	7(2)	0	36	0
14	DF	(Singapore) Afiq Yunos	11(3)	0	2(1)	1	0	0	7(1)	2	25	3
15	MF	(Singapore) Nawari Ahmad	0	0	0	0	0(1)	0	0	0	1	0
16	MF	(Singapore) Hafiz Sujad	18(3)	2	3(1)	3	0	0	8(2)	2	35	7
17	DF	(Singapore) Shakir Hamzah	16(4)	2	4	0	0	0	3(1)	0	28	2
18	FW	(Singapore) Sufian Anuar	1(8)	0	2(2)	1	1	1	0(2)	0	16	2
19	DF	(Singapore) Irwan Shah	14(5)	0	4	0	4	0	6(1)	0	34	0
20	DF	(South Korea) Kwon Jun	0	0	0	0	0	0	4(3)	0	7	0
21	GK	(Singapore) Joey Sim	6(1)	0	1	0	4	0	1	0	13	0
25	FW	(England) Billy Mehmet	22	12	3	2	4	3	6(1)	3	36	20
29	FW	(United States) Diego Silvas	1	2	0	0	0	0	0	0	1	2
30	MF	(Singapore) Aide Shazwandi	0	0	0	0	0(2)	0	0	0	2	0
32	DF	(Singapore) Ariyan Shamsuddin	0	0	0	0	1(1)	1	0	0	2	1
33	FW	(Singapore) Noor Faridzuan	0	0	0	0	0(1)	0	0	0	1	0
35	MF	(Singapore) Haiqal Sulaiman	0	0	0	0	0(1)	0	0	0	1	0
38	MF	(Singapore) Guatam Selvamany	0	0	0	0	3(1)	0	0	0	4	0
40	MF	(Singapore) Shafie Muliantoh	0	0	0	0	0(2)	0	0	0	2	0
43	MF	(Singapore) Saifullah Akbar	0(1)	0	0(1)	1	4	1	0	0	6	2

== Competitions ==
=== Overview ===
Competition	Record							
Competition	P	W	D	L	GF	GA	GD	Win %

=== S.League ===
Win Draw Loss

15 February 1	Tampines Rovers	3–3	Geylang International	Jurong West, Singapore
19:30 UTC+08:00	Webb 13'; Mehmet 34'; Yasir 86'	Details	Amy 35'; Delgado 55'; Ng 78'	Stadium: Jurong West Stadium; Attendance: 2,930; Referee: Sukhbir Singh

26 February 2	Tampines Rovers	4–1	Hougang United	Jurong West, Singapore
19:45 UTC+08:00	Shahdan 8'; Ismadi 11'; Pennant 20'; Fazrul 84'	Details	Plazibat 26'	Stadium: Jurong West Stadium; Attendance: 2,106; Referee: Ahmad A'Qashah

3 March 3	Home United	1–1	Tampines Rovers	Bishan, Singapore
19:30 UTC+08:00	Ilsø 25'	Details	Pennant 40'	Stadium: Bishan Stadium; Attendance: 3,551; Referee: Muhd Taqi

19 March 4	Brunei DPMM	1–2	Tampines Rovers	Bandar Seri Begawan, Brunei
20:15 UTC+08:00	Ramazotti 59'	Details	Mehmet 4'; Webb 15'	Stadium: Hassanal Bolkiah National Stadium; Referee: Farhad Mohd

3 April 5	Garena Young Lions	1–2	Tampines Rovers	Kallang, Singapore
19:30 UTC+08:00	Fareez 62' (pen.)	Details	Shakir 45' van Huizen 50'	Stadium: Jalan Besar Stadium; Attendance: 2,200; Referee: W. Ravisanthiran

7 April 6	Tampines Rovers	1–0	Balestier Khalsa	Jurong West, Singapore
19:30 UTC+08:00	Webb 47'	Details		Stadium: Jurong West Stadium; Referee: Jansen Foo

16 April 7	Albirex Niigata (S)	1–0	Tampines Rovers	Jurong East, Singapore
19:30 UTC+08:00	Inui 71' (pen.)	Details		Stadium: Jurong East Stadium; Attendance: 2,550; Referee: Ahmad A'Qashah

21 April 8	Geylang International	0–1	Tampines Rovers	Bedok, Singapore
19:30 UTC+08:00		Details	Yasir 28'	Stadium: Bedok Stadium; Attendance: 2,369; Referee: G. Letchman

30 April 9	Tampines Rovers	4–2	Warriors	Jurong West, Singapore
19:30 UTC+08:00	Mehmet 38'; Pennant 54' (pen.); Hafiz 75', 87'	Details	Hafiz N. 41'; Ridhuan 45'	Stadium: Jurong West Stadium; Attendance: 1,756; Referee: Farhad Mohd

4 May 10	Hougang United	1–1	Tampines Rovers	Hougang, Singapore
19:30 UTC+08:00	Iqbal 70'	Details	Mehmet 41' (pen.)	Stadium: Hougang Stadium; Attendance: 1,538; Referee: Ahmad A'Qashah

13 May 11	Tampines Rovers	1–2	Home United	Kallang, Singapore
19:45 UTC+08:00	Fazrul 22'	Details	Azhar 24'; Ilsø 70'	Stadium: Jalan Besar Stadium; Attendance: 2,099; Referee: Farhad Mohd

17 May^{A} 12	Warriors	0–0	Tampines Rovers	Choa Chu Kang, Singapore
19:30 UTC+08:00		Details		Stadium: Choa Chu Kang Stadium; Referee: Jansen Foo

11 June 13	Tampines Rovers	4–3	Brunei DPMM	Jurong West, Singapore
20:00 UTC+08:00	Fazrul 38'; Webb 45'; Mehmet 63'; Pennant 79'	Details	Hendra 43'; Ramazotti 57', 70'	Stadium: Jurong West Stadium; Referee: Muhd Taqi

14 June 14	Tampines Rovers	6–1	Garena Young Lions	Jurong West, Singapore
20:00 UTC+08:00	Fazrul 20'; Webb 25', 48', 80'; Mustafić 41'; Pennant 78' (pen.)	Details	Fareez 33'	Stadium: Jurong West Stadium; Referee: Nathan Chan

17 June 15	Balestier Khalsa	2–3	Tampines Rovers	Toa Payoh, Singapore
20:00 UTC+08:00	Krištić 64'; Fadli 90'	Details	Mehmet 6'; Fazrul 43', 74'	Stadium: Toa Payoh Stadium; Referee: Sukhbir Singh

24 June 16	Tampines Rovers	1–0	Albirex Niigata (S)	Jurong West, Singapore
20:00 UTC+08:00	Fazrul 81'	Details		Stadium: Jurong West Stadium; Referee: Jansen Foo

4 August 17	Tampines Rovers	2–1	Geylang International	Jurong West, Singapore
19:30 UTC+08:00	Webb 21'; Mehmet 39'	Details	Hartmann 42'	Stadium: Jurong West Stadium; Referee: W. Ravisanthiran

12 August 18	Warriors	2–3	Tampines Rovers	Choa Chu Kang, Singapore
19:30 UTC+08:00	Béhé 23'; Ridhuan 34'	Details	Mehmet 1', 75' (pen.); Webb 57'	Stadium: Choa Chu Kang Stadium; Referee: G. Letchman

17 August 19	Tampines Rovers	1–2	Hougang United	Jurong West, Singapore
19:30 UTC+08:00	Webb 45'	Details	Plazibat 22'; Kogure 90+2'	Stadium: Jurong West Stadium; Referee: Sukhbir Singh

10 September 20	Home United	1–0	Tampines Rovers	Bishan, Singapore
19:30 UTC+08:00	Shamil 74'	Details		Stadium: Bishan Stadium; Referee: G. Letchman

1 October 21	Tampines Rovers	0–1	Brunei DPMM	Jurong West, Singapore
19:30 UTC+08:00		Details	Rahman 4'	Stadium: Jurong West Stadium; Referee: G. Letchman

15 October 22	Garena Young Lions	1–3	Tampines Rovers	Kallang, Singapore
19:30 UTC+08:00	Syaffiq 57'	Details	Mehmet 54'; Hanapi 61'; Webb 76'	Stadium: Jalan Besar Stadium; Referee: W. Ravisanthiran

22 October 23	Tampines Rovers	2–0	Balestier Khalsa	Kallang, Singapore
19:30 UTC+08:00	Hamzah 39'; Mehmet 90+3'	Details		Stadium: Jalan Besar Stadium; Referee: Farhad Mohd

26 October 24	Albirex Niigata (S)	1–5	Tampines Rovers	Kallang, Singapore
19:45 UTC+08:00	Ishiyama 90'	Details	Mehmet 9'; Webb 37'; Silvas 42', 73'; Sulaiman 64'	Stadium: Jalan Besar Stadium; Referee: Ahmad A'Qashah

Pos	Team	Pld	W	D	L	GF	GA	GD	Pts	Qualification
1	(Japan) Albirex Niigata (S) (Note: The two foreign clubs – Albirex Niigata (S) and DPMM FC – as well as the Football Association of Singapore (FAS) under-21 team, Young Lions, are not eligible for any AFC competition spots.)	24	16	2	6	50	24	+26	50	
2	Tampines Rovers	24	15	4	5	50	28	+22	49	Qualification to AFC Champions League Preliminary Round 1 or AFC Cup Group Stage
3	(Brunei) DPMM FC	24	12	5	7	47	37	+10	41	
4	Home United	24	11	4	9	50	42	+8	37	Qualification to AFC Cup Play-off Round
5	Geylang International	24	10	7	7	35	29	+6	37	

Updated to match(es) played on 31 October 2016. Source: S.League
Rules for classification: 1) points; 2) goal difference; 3) number of goals scored; 4) number of wins

=== Singapore Cup ===
==== Quarter-final ====
29 June 2016	Tampines Rovers	3–1	(Philippines) Global FC	Jurong West Stadium, Singapore
20:00 UTC+8	Mehmet 15'; Fazrul 61'; Hafiz 69'	Details	Bahadoran 44'	Referee: Farhad Mohd

2 July 2016	Global FC (Philippines)	1–2	Tampines Rovers	Jalan Besar Stadium, Singapore
20:00 UTC+8	Minegishi 21'	Details	Mehmet 42'; Hafiz 72'	Referee: Ahmad A'Qashah

Tampines Rovers won 5–2 on aggregate.

==== Semi-final ====
21 August 2016	Tampines Rovers	2–1	(Philippines) Ceres-La Salle	Jurong West Stadium, Singapore
19:30 UTC+8	Mustafic 12'; Sufian 49'	Details	Bienve 17'	Referee: Farhad Mohd

24 August 2016	Ceres-La Salle (Philippines)	2–3	Tampines Rovers	Jalan Besar Stadium, Singapore
19:45 UTC+8	Schröck 12' (pen.); Reichelt 78'	Details	Hafiz Sujad 57'; Afiq Yunos 105'; S. Akbar 112'	Referee: Muhd Taqi

Tampines Rovers won 5–3 on aggregate.

==== Final ====
29 October 2016	Albirex Niigata (S) (Japan)	2–0	Tampines Rovers	Jalan Besar Stadium
20:00 UTC+8	Kawata 28'; Nagasaki 87'	Report		Referee: Sukhbir Singh

=== Singapore TNP League Cup ===
Pos	Team	Pld	W	D	L	GF	GA	GD	Pts	Qualification
1	(Brunei) DPMM FC	3	3	0	0	8	1	+7	9	Advance to semi-final
2	Tampines Rovers	3	2	0	1	10	6	+4	6	Advance to semi-final
3	Hougang United	3	1	0	2	8	9	−1	3	
4	Warriors FC	3	0	0	3	1	11	−10	0	

Source: S.League

Win Draw Loss

13 July 2016	Tampines Rovers	6–4	Hougang United	Jurong West Stadium, Singapore
19:30 UTC+8	Shahdan 28'; Na'iim 32' (o.g.); Webb 35'; Sufian 44' (pen.); Mehmet 75' (pen.); Saifullah 83'	Details	Kogure 56'; Kapláň 67', 87'; Plazibat 90'	Referee: Sukhbir Singh

17 July 2016	Warriors FC	0–3	Tampines Rovers	Jalan Besar Stadium, Singapore
19:30 UTC+8		Details	Mehmet 45'; Kwok 55'; Ariyan 62'	Referee: Jansen Foo

21 July 2016	DPMM FC (Brunei)	2–1	Tampines Rovers	Jalan Besar Stadium, Singapore
19:30 UTC+8	Adi Said 24'; Azim Izamuddin 86'	Details	Billy Mehmet 75' (pen.)	Referee: Ahmad A'Qashah

==== Semi-final ====
26 July 2016	(Japan) Albirex Niigata (S)	4–0	Tampines Rovers	Jurong East Stadium, Singapore
19:30 UTC+8	Kawata 32', 67', 72'; Tatsuro 87'	Details		Referee: Farhad Mohd

=== AFC Champions League ===
Win Draw Loss

==== Qualifying play-off ====
27 January 2016	Mohun Bagan (India)	3–1	(Singapore) Tampines Rovers	Salt Lake Stadium, Kolkata
19:00 UTC+5:30	Lalpekhlua 6'; Glen 42'; Yusa 84'	Report	Hanapi 44'	Attendance: 12,640; Referee: Jarred Gillett (Australia)

=== AFC Cup ===
==== Group stage ====
Win Draw Loss

23 February 2016	Tampines Rovers (Singapore)	4–0	(Bangladesh) Sheikh Jamal Dhanmondi	Jalan Besar Stadium, Singapore
19:30 UTC+8	Mehmet 2'; Abu Sujad 33'; Yunos 52'; Barman 54' (o.g.)	Report		Attendance: 2,378; Referee: Ali Abdulnabi (Bahrain)

8 March 2016	Selangor (Malaysia)	0–1	(Singapore) Tampines Rovers	Majlis Perbandaran Selayang Stadium, Selayang
20:45 UTC+8		Report	Fazrul 26'	Attendance: 5,985; Referee: Khamis Al-Kuwari (Qatar)

15 March 2016	Tampines Rovers (Singapore)	1–1	(Philippines) Ceres	Jalan Besar Stadium, Singapore
19:30 UTC+8	Abu Sujad 69'	Report	Gallardo 88'	Attendance: 2,241; Referee: Ho Wai Sing (Hong Kong)

12 April 2016	Ceres (Philippines)	2–1	(Singapore) Tampines Rovers	Panaad Park and Stadium, Bacolod
19:00 UTC+8	Bienve 21' (pen.); Gallardo 36' (pen.)	Report	Mehmet 64'	Attendance: 6,400; Referee: Wang Di (China)

26 April 2016	Sheikh Jamal Dhanmondi (Bangladesh)	3–2	(Singapore) Tampines Rovers	Bangabandhu National Stadium, Dhaka
18:30 UTC+6	Darboe 20', 82'; Onuoha 56' (pen.)	Report	Mustafić 44'; Mehmet 70'	Attendance: 550; Referee: Yaqoob Abdul Baki (Oman)

10 May 2016	Tampines Rovers (Singapore)	1–0	(Malaysia) Selangor	National Stadium, Singapore
19:00 UTC+8	Hanapi 31'	Report		Attendance: 11,875; Referee: Jameel Abdulhusin (Bahrain)

Pos	Team	Pld	W	D	L	GF	GA	GD	Pts	Qualification	CER	TAM	SEL	SJD
1	(Philippines) Ceres	6	3	3	0	12	4	+8	12	Knockout stage	—	2–1	2–2	5–0
2	(Singapore) Tampines Rovers	6	3	1	2	10	6	+4	10	Knockout stage	1–1	—	1–0	4–0
3	(Malaysia) Selangor	6	2	2	2	8	8	0	8		0–0	0–1	—	2–1
4	(Bangladesh) Sheikh Jamal Dhanmondi	6	1	0	5	7	19	−12	3		0–2	3–2	3–4	—

Source: AFC
Rules for classification: Group stage tiebreakers

==== Knockout stage ====
24 May 2016	Mohun Bagan (India)	1–2 (a.e.t.)	(Singapore) Tampines Rovers	Indira Gandhi Athletic Stadium, Guwahati
19:00 UTC+5:30	Singh 72'	Report	Webb 63'; Yunos 116'	Attendance: 282; Referee: Turki Al-Khudhayr (Saudi Arabia)

14 September 2016	Bengaluru FC (India)	1–0	(Singapore) Tampines Rovers	Sree Kanteerava Stadium, Bengaluru
16:00 UTC+5:30	Vineeth 7'	Report		Attendance: 120 (Note: The Bengaluru FC v Tampines Rovers match was played behind closed doors due to local unrest.); Referee: Ahmed Al-Kaf (Oman)

21 September 2016	Tampines Rovers (Singapore)	0–0	(India) Bengaluru FC	Jalan Besar Stadium, Singapore
19:30 UTC+8		Report		Attendance: 1,985; Referee: Kim Dong-jin (South Korea)

Bengaluru FC won 1–0 on aggregate.
