= Njazi Kuqi =

Finnish footballer (born 1983)

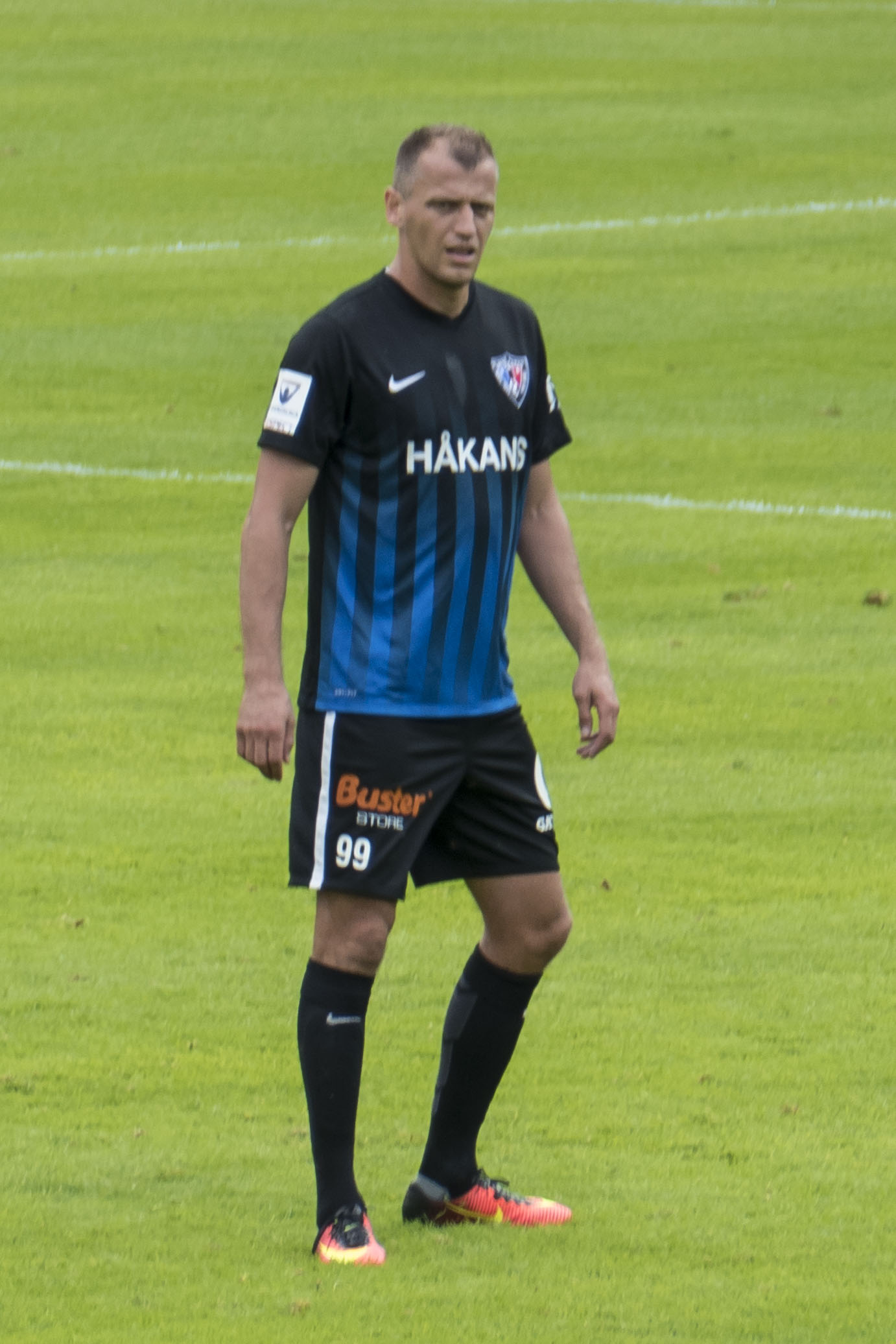
- Kuqi with Inter Turku in 2016

Personal information
- Date of birth: 25 March 1983 (age 43)
- Place of birth: Vučitrn, SFR Yugoslavia
- Height: 6 ft 4 in (1.93 m)
- Position: Forward

Youth career
- 1998–1999: FinnPa
- 1999–2000: MP
- 2001: Kapa-51

Senior career*
| Years | Team | Apps | (Gls) |
| 2002–2005 | Lahti | 53 | (16) |
| 2005–2006 | Birmingham City | 0 | (0) |
| 2006 | → Blackpool (loan) | 4 | (0) |
| 2006 | → Peterborough United (loan) | 1 | (0) |
| 2006 | Groningen | 0 | (0) |
| 2007–2008 | Carl Zeiss Jena | 1 | (0) |
| 2008–2010 | TuS Koblenz | 52 | (11) |
| 2010 | Stevenage | 1 | (0) |
| 2010 | Dundee | 3 | (0) |
| 2011 | TPS Turku | 21 | (8) |
| 2011–2012 | Panionios | 24 | (10) |
| 2012–2013 | Atromitos | 24 | (1) |
| 2014 | Pro Vercelli | 8 | (0) |
| 2014 | Olympiacos Volos | 8 | (3) |
| 2015 | SG Sonnenhof | 7 | (0) |
| 2016 | PK-35 Vantaa | 12 | (8) |
| 2016–2017 | Inter Turku | 31 | (15) |
| 2017–2018 | ATK | 6 | (1) |
| 2019 | HIFK | 6 | (0) |

International career
| 2005–2013 | Finland | 12 | (5) |
Medal record
Finland national football team
| Runner-up | Baltic Cup | 2012 |
Lahti
| Runner-up | Finnish Cup | 2002 |
| Runner-up | Finnish League Cup | 2004 |
- * Club domestic league appearances and goals

Njazi Kuqi (born 25 March 1983) is a Finnish former professional footballer, who played as a forward.

Kuqi started his career with FC Lahti of the Veikkausliiga in 2002, spending three years with the club and scoring twenty goals in all competitions. In January 2005, Kuqi signed for Birmingham City, but failed to make any first–team appearances during his 18-month spell with the club. During his time at Birmingham, Kuqi was loaned out for a month to Blackpool in January 2006, making four appearances before returning to his parent club. He was loaned out once again in March 2006, joining Peterborough United until the end of the 2005–06 season. However, he only made one appearance for Peterborough, and returned to Birmingham a month earlier than scheduled. At the end of the campaign, Kuqi was released by Birmingham.

Ahead of the 2006–07 season, Kuqi joined Dutch side FC Groningen on a free transfer. However, he was released just two months after signing for the club, having not made a single appearance for the club. Six months later, in January 2007, Kuqi signed for German outfit FC Carl Zeiss Jena, but made just one first–team appearance in twelve months, before signing for TuS Koblenz in January 2008 on a three–year deal. He spent two and a half seasons with Koblenz, scoring eleven times. In August 2010, Kuqi joined League Two side Stevenage, but left after playing just one game. Shortly after, in September 2010, Kuqi joined Dundee on a one-year deal, but was released a month later when the club went into administration. Kuqi has also played internationally for the Finland national team, earning 12 caps and scoring 5 goals for his country.

== Club career ==
=== Youth career ===
Kuqi was born in Vučitrn, SFR Yugoslavia (present-day Vushtrri, Kosovo), and moved to Finland with his family as a child. In Finland, Kuqi played for youth sectors of Finnairin Palloilijat, MP Mikkeli and Kangasniemen Palloilijat. Also HJK (Helsingin jalkapallo klubi)

=== FC Lahti ===
He began his senior career with FC Lahti in 2002, aged 19, and he was named Finland's Under-21 Player of the Year in 2004. Kuqi spent three seasons with the club, scoring a total of 20 goals in 57 appearances in all competitions.

=== Birmingham ===
In January 2005, Kuqi signed for Birmingham City for a fee of £400,000, but failed to make any first–team appearances for the club during the latter stages of the 2004–05 season, although he was an unused substitute in Birmingham's 2–0 away defeat to Chelsea in the FA Cup. Kuqi featured regularly for Birmingham's reserve side, but had a number of more experienced strikers in front of him, including Emile Heskey and Mikael Forssell, which made it difficult for him to break into the starting eleven.

During the second half of the 2005–06 season, Kuqi was sent out on loan to Blackpool on a month's loan deal. A day after joining the club, he made his debut in the club's 4–2 win against Doncaster Rovers, coming on as an 81st-minute substitute. Kuqi subsequently started in the club's 3–0 loss away to MK Dons, and played a total of four times for Blackpool before returning to his parent club. In March 2006, Kuqi was loaned out once more, this time to Peterborough United until the end of the season. However, Kuqi played just once for the club, starting in Peterborough's 2–2 draw with Barnet, before returning to Birmingham a month earlier than expected. At the end of the 2006–07 season, Kuqi was released by Birmingham, having not made a single first–team appearance.

=== Groningen ===
In June 2006, Kuqi signed for FC Groningen on a free transfer, where he was to compete for a place in the team with players such as the former Manchester United striker Erik Nevland. After a range of conflicts, Kuqi was released by Groningen in August 2006, having made no first-team appearances for the club, with the season just two weeks old.

=== Carl Zeiss Jena ===
Six months later, he signed an 18-month contract with FC Carl Zeiss Jena after failing to win a contract during a trial at his brother's former club, Ipswich Town. However, Kuqi struggled to make first-team appearances for the club, and was subsequently featuring regularly in the reserve side, FC Carl Zeis Jena II, in the German NOFV-Oberliga.

=== TuS Koblenz ===
In January 2008, he joined TuS Koblenz on a three-year contract. During the second half of the club's 2007–08 campaign, Kuqi scored four goals in nine appearances, scoring his first goal for Koblenz in a 1–1 draw away to FC St. Pauli. He also scored in the club's 3–2 away win against 1. FC Kaiserslautern ten days later. He subsequently started the following season as the club's point of attack, and played a total of 29 games during the season, scoring five times as Koblenz narrowly avoided relegation. Kuqi remained at the club ahead of the 2009–10 season, although his season was disrupted by persistent injuries, only managing to play in 14 games, scoring twice in losses against FC St. Pauli and Karlsruher SC respectively. Kuqi played his last game for the club in March 2010, coming on as an 83rd-minute substitute in a 2–0 loss to Rot-Weiß Oberhausen. He left the club at the end of the 2009–10 season.

Kuqi spent a week on trial at Dutch Eerste Divisie side RBC Roosendaal in July 2010, scoring in the club's 1–0 friendly win against Royal Antwerp. However, just three days after his trial at Roosendaal, Kuqi linked up with his brother Shefki once again, having previously played alongside him at Koblenz, as he joined Championship side Swansea City on trial for two weeks. He featured in a pre–season friendly against Port Talbot Town, scoring the winning goal in the 93rd minute. He also netted in another friendly against Llanelli, scoring the final goal of the game from 25–yards in a 5–1 win. However, he was unsuccessful in his attempt to earn a contract at Swansea, and subsequently requested a trial at League Two side Stevenage in August 2010.

=== Stevenage ===
He played in a reserve match for the club against Ipswich Town. Three days later, Kuqi made his debut in the club's 3–1 win against Stockport County, coming on as a substitute in the 84th minute. He left Stevenage after failing to secure a full-time contract with the club.

=== Dundee ===
Shortly after, on 1 September 2010, Kuqi signed for Scottish First Division club Dundee on a one-year contract. He made his debut for the club in a 3–1 loss to Dunfermline Athletic, and featured in two other games for the club. However, in October 2010, Kuqi was one of nine players released by Dundee after the club went into administration. On being released, Kuqi said "My family just moved in two weeks ago. Of course you feel let down. Before I came here they spoke differently. They promised things and then after five weeks you're in administration".

=== TPS Turku ===
On 28 March 2011, TPS Turku announced that the club had signed Kuqi on a one-year contract. He made his debut for the club on 6 May 2011, scoring in a 2–0 win over HJK Helsinki, the first game of the 2011 Veikkausliiga season. Kuqi scored eight goals in 23 appearances for the club during the 2011 season.

=== Panionios ===
In September 2011, Kuqi joined Super League side Panionios. He made his debut for the club in a 1–0 away win against Panetolikos, scoring the only goal of the game in the eleventh minute. Two weeks later, in his third appearance for the club, Kuqi scored twice in a 3–0 victory away at Kerkyra.

=== Atromitos ===
In June 2012 it was announced that Kuqi would transfer from Panionios to another Super League club, Atromitos, a club which he left after a mutual consent contract termination.

=== ATK ===
On 12 September 2017, Kuqi joined Indian Super League franchise ATK for the 2017–18 season. He was released in January 2018, having scored once in six appearances.

=== Helsinki IFK ===
On 11 December 2018, Finnish Veikkausliiga-side HIFK Fotboll announced, that they had signed Kuqi for the 2019 season on a one-year deal.

== International career ==
In March 2005, Kuqi was called up to the Finland squad for a friendly against Kuwait. He started the match, and scored the only goal of the game in a 1–0 win. Six days later, he came off the substitute's bench to score twice within the space of five minutes in Finland's 4–1 win against Saudi Arabia. In 2005, he got a six-month ban to the national team after leaving the team, after a U21-match against Czech Republic was played, for a birthday night out in Prague with a fellow international Toni Koskela. After that, Kuqi was out of the picture and it was thought that he was keen to play for Kosovo, but in August 2008 he was called up to the squad once more when Stuart Baxter selected him for a friendly against Israel, although he was an unused substitute. In September 2008, Kuqi gained his third cap as a 75th-minute substitute in Finland's 2010 World Cup qualifier against Germany, with the game ending 3–3.

== Personal life ==
He is the younger brother of footballer Shefki Kuqi and older brother of footballer Albert Kuqi. They are of Kosovo Albanian descent.

== Career statistics ==
As of 19 January 2018

=== Club ===
Appearances and goals by club, season and competition
| Club | Season | League | | | National cup | | League cup | | Other | | Total | |
| Club | Season | Division | Apps | Goals | Apps | Goals | Apps | Goals | Apps | Goals | Apps | Goals |
|---|---|---|---|---|---|---|---|---|---|---|---|---|
| Lahti | 2002 | Veikkausliiga | 24 | 5 | | | | | | | 24 | 5 |
| Lahti | 2003 | Veikkausliiga | 14 | 6 | | | | | | | 14 | 6 |
| Lahti | 2004 | Veikkausliiga | 15 | 5 | | | | | | | 15 | 5 |
| Lahti | 2005 | Veikkausliiga | 0 | 0 | | | | | | | 0 | 0 |
| Lahti | Total | | 53 | 16 | | | | | | | 53 | 16 |
| Birmingham City | 2004–05 | Premier League | 0 | 0 | 0 | 0 | 0 | 0 | — | | 0 | 0 |
| Birmingham City | 2005–06 | Premier League | 0 | 0 | 0 | 0 | 0 | 0 | — | | 0 | 0 |
| Birmingham City | Total | | 0 | 0 | 0 | 0 | 0 | 0 | 0 | 0 | 0 | 0 |
| Blackpool (loan) | 2005–06 | League One | 4 | 0 | 0 | 0 | 0 | 0 | 0 | 0 | 4 | 0 |
| Peterborough United (loan) | 2005–06 | League Two | 1 | 0 | 0 | 0 | 0 | 0 | 0 | 0 | 1 | 0 |
| Carl Zeiss Jena | 2006–07 | 2. Bundesliga | 1 | 0 | 0 | 0 | 0 | 0 | 0 | 0 | 1 | 0 |
| Carl Zeiss Jena | 2007–08 | 2. Bundesliga | 0 | 0 | 0 | 0 | 0 | 0 | 0 | 0 | 0 | 0 |
| Carl Zeiss Jena | Total | | 1 | 0 | 0 | 0 | 0 | 0 | 0 | 0 | 1 | 0 |
| TuS Koblenz | 2007–08 | 2. Bundesliga | 9 | 4 | 0 | 0 | 0 | 0 | 0 | 0 | 9 | 4 |
| TuS Koblenz | 2008–09 | 2. Bundesliga | 29 | 5 | 1 | 0 | 0 | 0 | 0 | 0 | 30 | 6 |
| TuS Koblenz | 2009–10 | 2. Bundesliga | 14 | 2 | 2 | 0 | 0 | 0 | 0 | 0 | 16 | 2 |
| TuS Koblenz | Total | | 52 | 11 | 3 | 0 | 0 | 0 | 0 | 0 | 55 | 11 |
| Stevenage | 2010–11 | League Two | 1 | 0 | 0 | 0 | 0 | 0 | 0 | 0 | 1 | 0 |
| Dundee | 2010–11 | Scottish First Division | 3 | 0 | 0 | 0 | 0 | 0 | 0 | 0 | 3 | 0 |
| TPS Turku | 2011 | Veikkausliiga | 21 | 8 | | | | | 2 (Note: Appearances in UEFA Europa League) | 0 | 23 | 8 |
| Panionios | 2011–12 | Super League Greece | 24 | 10 | 2 | 0 | — | | — | | 26 | 10 |
| Atromitos | 2012–13 | Super League Greece | 16 | 1 | 1 | 0 | — | | 2 | 0 | 19 | 1 |
| Pro Vercelli | 2013–14 | Lega Pro Prima Divisione | 7 | 0 | 0 | 0 | 0 | 0 | 1 (Note: Appearance in Lega Pro Prima Divisione playoffs) | 0 | 8 | 0 |
| Olympiacos Volou | 2014–15 | Football League (Greece) | 8 | 3 | 3 | 0 | — | | — | | 11 | 3 |
| SG Sonnenhof Großaspach | 2014–15 | 3. Liga | 8 | 3 | 3 | 0 | — | | — | | 11 | 3 |
| PK-35 Vantaa | 2016 | Veikkausliiga | 12 | 8 | 1 | 1 | 5 | 2 | — | | 18 | 11 |
| Inter Turku | 2016 | Veikkausliiga | 13 | 8 | 0 | 0 | 0 | 0 | 1 (Note: Appearances in relegation play-offs) | 0 | 14 | 8 |
| Inter Turku | 2017 | Veikkausliiga | 18 | 7 | 3 | 0 | — | | — | | 22 | 7 |
| Inter Turku | Total | | 31 | 15 | 3 | 0 | 0 | 0 | 1 | 0 | 35 | 15 |
| ATK | 2017–18 | Indian Super League | 6 | 1 | — | | — | | — | | 6 | 1 |
| Career total | | | 248 | 76 | 16 | 1 | 5 | 2 | 6 | 0 | 375 | 79 |

=== International ===
Appearances and goals by national team and year
| National team | Year | Apps | Goals |
|---|---|---|---|
| Finland | 2005 | 2 | 3 |
| Finland | 2008 | 1 | 0 |
| Finland | 2012 | 8 | 2 |
| Finland | 2013 | 1 | 0 |
| Total | | 12 | 5 |

Scores and results list Finland's goal tally first, score column indicates score after each Kuqi goal.

List of international goals scored by Njazi Kuqi
| No. | Date | Venue | Opponent | Score | Result | Competition |
|---|---|---|---|---|---|---|
| 1 | 12 March 2005 | Kuwait National Stadium, Kuwait City, Kuwait | Kuwait | 1–0 | 1–0 | Friendly |
| 2 | 18 March 2005 | Prince Mohamed bin Fahd Stadium, Dammam, Saudi Arabia | Saudi Arabia | 2–1 | 4–1 | Friendly |
| 3 | 18 March 2005 | Prince Mohamed bin Fahd Stadium, Dammam, Saudi Arabia | Saudi Arabia | 4–1 | 4–1 | Friendly |
| 4 | 1 June 2012 | Tamme Stadium, Tartu, Finland | Estonia | 1–0 | 2–1 | Friendly |
| 5 | 1 June 2012 | Tamme Stadium, Tartu, Finland | Estonia | 2–0 | 2–1 | Friendly |
