= Manolis Kallergis =

Greek footballer

Personal information
- Full name: Emmanouil Kallergis
- Date of birth: 5 December 1990 (age 35)
- Place of birth: Amfissa, Greece
- Height: 1.82 m (6 ft 0 in)
- Position: Winger

Team information
- Current team: Ethnikos Piraeus

Youth career
- 2007–2008: Akadimia '94
- 2008–2009: Kechagias Prosilio
- 2009–2010: A.O. Karditsa

Senior career*
Years	Team	Apps	(Gls)
2010–2012	Fokikos	60	(6)
2012–2016	Atromitos	2	(0)
2014	→ Ionikos (loan)	12	(2)
2014–2015	→ Fokikos (loan)	22	(5)
2015	→ Lamia (loan)	0	(0)
2016–2017	Parnassos		
2017–2020	AO Diana	87	(51)
2020	AONF Attalos	4	(1)
2021–2023	A.E. Kifisia	61	(5)
2023–2024	Kozani	32	(5)
2024–2026	Marko	35	(6)
2026	Pyrgos		
2026–	Ethnikos Piraeus		
- * Club domestic league appearances and goals as of 29 September 2025

Manolis Kallergis (Greek: Μανώλης Καλλέργης, born 5 December 1990) is a Greek professional football player who plays as a winger for Gamma Ethniki club Ethnikos Piraeus.

Kallergis has played for Akadimia '94, Kechagias Prosilio and A.O. Karditsa in the 2009-10 Delta Ethniki. Since 2010, Kallergis made a total of 60 league appearances for Fokikos in the Football League and Football League 2. He signed for Atromitos in June 2012.
