= Ingi Højsted =

Faroese footballer (born 1985)

Personal information
- Date of birth: 12 November 1985 (age 40)
- Place of birth: Tórshavn, Faroe Islands
- Height: 1.74 m (5 ft 8 1/2 in)
- Position: Midfielder

Team information
- Current team: B36 Tórshavn
- Number: 6

Youth career
- B36 Tórshavn

Senior career*
Years	Team	Apps	(Gls)
2002–2005	Arsenal	0	(0)
2005	B36 Tórshavn	25	(1)
2005–2006	Birmingham City	0	(0)
2006–2011	B36 Tórshavn	51	(2)

International career^{‡}
2003–2008	Faroe Islands	6	(0)
- * Club domestic league appearances and goals as of 31 December 2011 ‡ National team caps and goals as of 31 October 2008

Ingi Højsted (born 12 November 1985) is a Faroese retired football midfielder, who last played for B36 Tórshavn. He has been capped for the Faroe Islands at senior level.

== Club career ==
In the summer of 2002 he joined Arsenal in London as a trainee, later playing for B36 Tórshavn. On 22 November 2005 Birmingham City signed him until the end of the season. Højsted has since parted company with Birmingham City after playing only 45 minutes of reserve team football.

His career's progression was curtailed by several short to long-term injuries, of which fostered him eventually retiring.

== International career ==
Højsted made his debut for the Faroe Islands in an April 2003 friendly match against Kazakhstan, coming on as a substitute for Jákup á Borg. He has collected 6 caps and has scored no goals.
