= Carl Preston =

English footballer (born 1991)

Personal information
- Full name: Carl William Preston
- Date of birth: 25 April 1991 (age 35)
- Place of birth: Poole, England
- Position: Midfielder

Team information
- Current team: Poole Town

Youth career
- 2006–2008: AFC Bournemouth

Senior career*
Years	Team	Apps	(Gls)
2008–2009	AFC Bournemouth	2	(0)
2009	→Poole Town (loan)	8	(3)
2009	Weymouth	3	(0)
2009–	Poole Town	138	(44)
- * Club domestic league appearances and goals

Carl William Preston (born 1991) is an English footballer. He started his career with AFC Bournemouth.

Preston made four first team appearances for AFC Bournemouth. His league debut came against Bury at Dean Court on 20 December 2008. In July 2009, Preston joined Conference South side Weymouth on a one-year contract. He left in August 2009 and signed for then Wessex League side Poole Town.

He went on trial at Reading from 3–6 May 2011. Although Carl has had many trials at different clubs he is still playing at Poole Town FC.
