= Darren Anderton =

English footballer

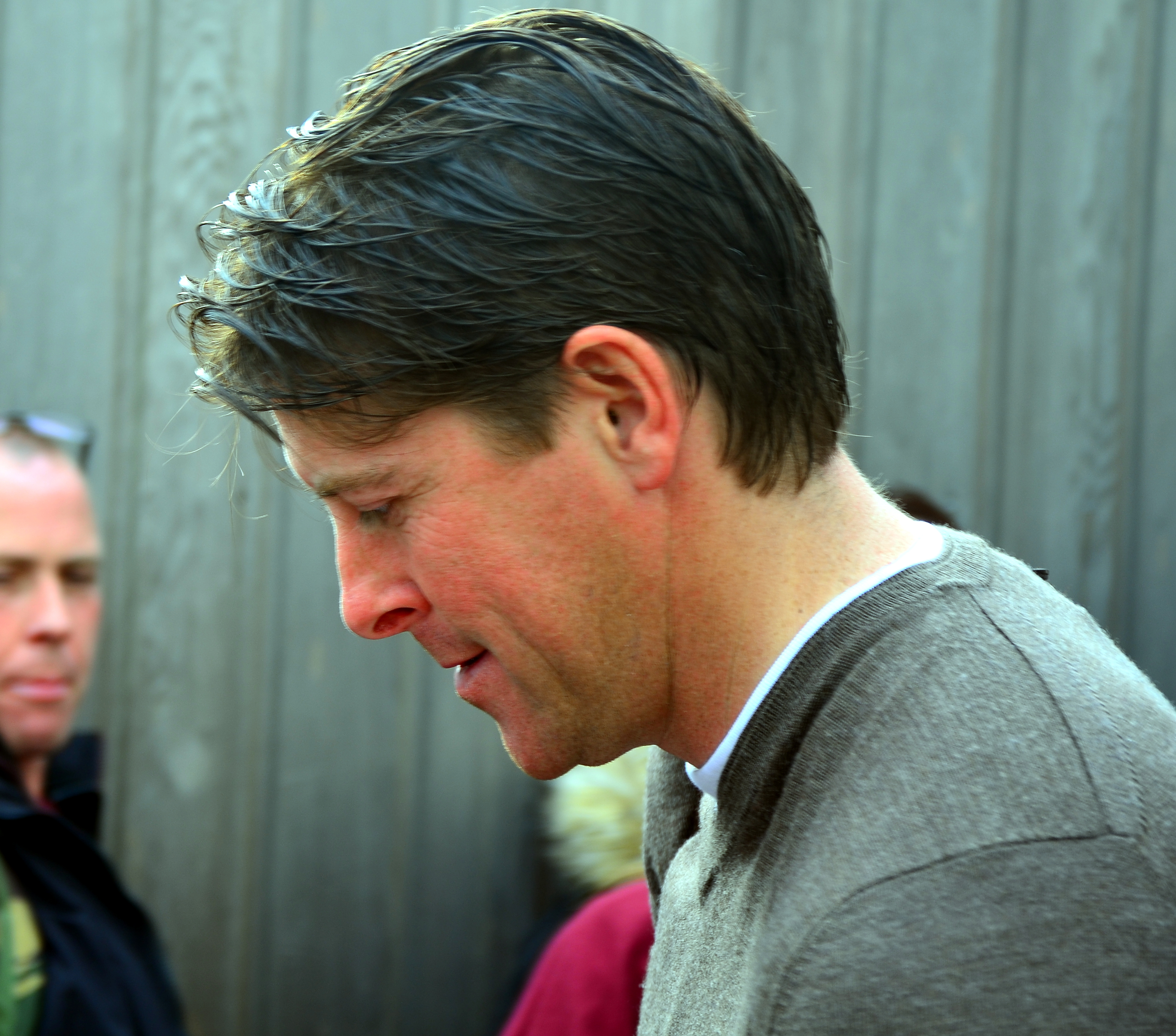
- Anderton in 2013

Personal information
- Full name: Darren Robert Anderton
- Date of birth: 3 March 1972 (age 54)
- Place of birth: Southampton, Hampshire, England
- Height: 1.85 m (6 ft 1 in)
- Positions: Winger; attacking midfielder

Youth career
- 1985–1987: Itchen Saints

Senior career*
Years	Team	Apps	(Gls)
1990–1992	Portsmouth	62	(7)
1992–2004	Tottenham Hotspur	299	(35)
2004–2005	Birmingham City	20	(3)
2005–2006	Wolverhampton Wanderers	24	(1)
2006–2008	AFC Bournemouth	66	(12)
Total		471	(57)

International career
1992–1993	England U21	12	(5)
1998	England B	1	(0)
1994–2001	England	30	(7)
- * Club domestic league appearances and goals

Darren Robert Anderton (born 3 March 1972) is an English former professional footballer and pundit.

As a player, he was a midfielder who notably played in the Premier League for Tottenham Hotspur and Birmingham City. His twelve-year spell with Spurs yielded 299 league appearances, scoring 35 goals. He won the League Cup with Spurs in 1999, and was then runners-up in the same tournament again in 2002.

He also played in the English Football League for Portsmouth and Wolverhampton Wanderers before finishing his career with AFC Bournemouth. In his final ever game as a professional player he came off the bench to score the winner with a spectacular volley in a 3–2 win for Bournemouth on 6 December 2008. He was capped 30 times by England, scoring seven goals and started every match at UEFA Euro 1996 and the 1998 FIFA World Cup.

Since retirement, Anderton has largely worked as a pundit, notably for Canada's The Sports Network.

== Club career ==
=== Portsmouth ===
Anderton started his career in the Southampton Tyro League and played for Itchen Saints during a successful period for the side. His potential was evident and he was soon scouted and playing youth football at professional clubs.

Anderton was signed as an apprentice by Portsmouth manager Alan Ball, coming to prominence at 18 when he scored at Anfield in an FA Youth Cup match against Liverpool which ended 2–2. His first team debut came against Cardiff City in the second round of the League Cup in October 1990 as a substitute for youth team colleague Darryl Powell. Anderton made his full league debut against Wolverhampton Wanderers in a 0–0 draw, making 20 appearances in the 1990–91 season. Under new manager Jim Smith, Anderton became a regular in the attacking side of the 1991–92 season, scoring his first club goal in the season opener against Blackburn Rovers. His performances soon drew the attention of bigger clubs and after an impressive FA Cup run, during which he scored in a semi-final clash with Liverpool, he joined Tottenham Hotspur for £1.75 million in 1992.

=== Tottenham Hotspur ===
After a slow start, Anderton settled at Tottenham, playing as a right winger, forming part of an exciting attacking trio along with Teddy Sheringham and the young Nick Barmby. He turned down a move to Manchester United in the summer of 1995 following an exciting season spent playing with the likes of Jürgen Klinsmann at Tottenham, a decision that he later regretted.

Anderton won the 1998–99 League Cup with Tottenham, and signed a new reported £24,000-a-week contract in March 2000.

In the summer of 2001, Anderton was heavily linked with a move to Liverpool, but he remained at Tottenham for the 2001–02 season and started in his second League Cup final, which Spurs lost 2–1 to Blackburn Rovers.

Despite interest from Leeds United in 2002 and both Portsmouth and West Ham United in 2003, Anderton remained at Tottenham until the summer of 2004. He was keen to remain at the club and was promised a new contract by David Pleat but the club, under the advice of incoming manager Jacques Santini, reneged. In all, he appeared in 364 games for Spurs, scoring 51 goals.

=== Birmingham City and Wolverhampton Wanderers ===
Birmingham City swooped to sign Anderton on a free transfer for the 2004–05 season. His best moment for the Blues was scoring the winner in the 1–0 victory over Liverpool at Anfield.

Anderton left Birmingham on a free transfer after one year and reunited with his former Tottenham and England coach Glenn Hoddle at Wolverhampton Wanderers, signing a one-year deal at the start of the 2005–06 season. He played 24 times for Wolves, scoring once in the league against Sheffield Wednesday. He also scored in a 5–1 win over Chester City in the League Cup. His contract was not renewed at season's end.

=== AFC Bournemouth ===
On 8 September 2006, Anderton joined League One club AFC Bournemouth on a 'pay-as-you-play' basis, scoring a spectacular 40-yard free kick on his first-team debut against Scunthorpe United. On 10 February 2007, he scored his first career hat-trick against Leyton Orient. Following a pre-season friendly with Portsmouth in July 2007, Portsmouth boss Harry Redknapp heaped praise on Anderton, telling the Bournemouth Daily Echo: "In the right team and with the right players around him, I honestly think he could still be playing in the Premiership".

At the start of the 2007–08 season, Anderton was named as Bournemouth's club captain by manager Kevin Bond. Anderton spearheaded a survival bid at the end of the season, with the Cherries winning six of the seven last games, but, ultimately, a 1–1 draw with Carlisle on the final day saw Bournemouth relegated to League Two. Bournemouth were deducted 10 points earlier in the season for going into administration and had this not happened they would have finished 15th.

Anderton signed a new one-year contract with Bournemouth at the start of the 2008–09 season which would have taken him past his 37th birthday. However, on 4 December 2008, Anderton announced he would retire on 7 December 2008, one day after his last game for club against Chester City. In his last match, Anderton scored the winning goal with a spectacular volley in the 88th minute after coming on as a substitute in the second half of the game.

== International career ==
In March 1994, Anderton was named in Terry Venables' first squad as England manager and went on to start in the friendly match against Denmark at Wembley Stadium. He scored his first goal for England in his second cap; opening the scoring in a 5–0 friendly win over Greece on 18 May 1994.

In June 1995, Anderton appeared for England at the Umbro Cup mini tournament where he scored the opening goal of a 2–1 win against Japan and a stoppage time equaliser in a 3–3 draw with Sweden.

Despite missing most of the 1995–96 season, first because of hernia surgery and then with a groin injury that kept him out for eight months, Anderton was named in England's squad for UEFA Euro 1996. He scored twice during his first England appearance in 11 months in a pre-tournament friendly against Hungary. He went on to play every match for the England team that reached the semi-finals of the tournament and, in the semi-final against Germany, Anderton came within inches of putting England into the final when his shot hit the post during Golden Goal extra time.

Anderton did not make a single appearance for England during the 1998 FIFA World Cup qualifiers due to injury but was included in England's final squad by Glenn Hoddle. He appeared for the first time since Euro 96 in a pre-World Cup friendly against Saudi Arabia, where he started at right wingback as the team drew 0–0.

Anderton was again ever present during the 1998 World Cup and scored a spectacular opening goal in England's final Group G match against Colombia.

After missing UEFA Euro 2000 with an Achilles tendon injury, Anderton played in England's 1–1 draw away to France in September 2000 and also featured against Italy the following November.

In November 2001, Anderton made his final England appearance in a friendly against Sweden. He was selected in England's squad for their next game, a friendly against the Netherlands in February 2002 but withdrew due to injury and was not included in the squad for the 2002 FIFA World Cup.

One notable statistic about Anderton's England career is that his last five caps were given to him by five different managers. These were: vs Czech Republic (18 November 1998) by Glenn Hoddle, vs France (10 February 1999) by Howard Wilkinson, vs France (2 September 2000) by Kevin Keegan, vs Italy (15 November 2000) by Peter Taylor and vs Sweden (10 November 2001) by Sven-Göran Eriksson.

== Personal life ==
Renowned as a player of huge potential, Anderton's career was constantly frustrated by injury, earning him the nickname "Sicknote", which was coined by Portsmouth goalkeeper Andy Gosney.

Anderton has worked as the in-studio analyst for Canadian network TSN's coverage of Euro 2012.

As of 2015 he resided in California.

== Career statistics ==
=== Club ===
Appearances and goals by club, season and competition
Club	Season	League			FA Cup		League Cup		Other		Total	
Club	Season	Division	Apps	Goals	Apps	Goals	Apps	Goals	Apps	Goals	Apps	Goals
Portsmouth	1990–91	Second Division	20	0	1	0	1	0	1 (Note: Appearances in Full Members' Cup)	0	23	0
Portsmouth	1991–92	Second Division	42	7	7	5	4	1	1	0	54	13
Portsmouth	Total		62	7	8	5	5	1	2	0	77	13
Tottenham Hotspur	1992–93	Premier League	34	7	5	1	2	1	—		41	8
Tottenham Hotspur	1993–94	Premier League	37	6	3	0	5	0	—		45	6
Tottenham Hotspur	1994–95	Premier League	37	5	6	1	2	1	—		45	7
Tottenham Hotspur	1995–96	Premier League	8	2	0	0	1	0	0	0	9	2
Tottenham Hotspur	1996–97	Premier League	16	3	0	0	3	2	—		19	5
Tottenham Hotspur	1997–98	Premier League	15	0	0	0	0	0	—		15	0
Tottenham Hotspur	1998–99	Premier League	32	3	7	2	7	0	—		46	5
Tottenham Hotspur	1999–2000	Premier League	22	3	0	0	0	0	0	0	22	3
Tottenham Hotspur	2000–2001	Premier League	23	2	2	1	1	1	—		26	4
Tottenham Hotspur	2001–02	Premier League	35	3	3	1	6	1	—		44	5
Tottenham Hotspur	2002–03	Premier League	20	0	1	0	1	0	—		22	0
Tottenham Hotspur	2003–04	Premier League	20	1	1	0	3	2	—		24	3
Tottenham Hotspur	Total		299	35	28	6	31	8	0	0	358	49
Birmingham City	2004–05	Premier League	20	3	2	0	2	0	—		24	3
Wolverhampton Wanderers	2005–06	Championship	24	1	1	0	1	1	—		26	2
AFC Bournemouth	2006–07	League One	28	6	2	0	0	0	1 (Note: Appearances in Football League Trophy)	0	31	6
AFC Bournemouth	2007–08	League One	20	3	0	0	1	0	2	0	23	3
AFC Bournemouth	2008–09	League Two	18	3	2	0	1	0	3	1	24	4
AFC Bournemouth	Total		66	12	4	0	2	0	6	1	78	13
Career total			471	57	43	11	41	10	8	1	563	79

=== International ===
Appearances and goals by national team and year
National team	Year	Apps	Goals
England	1994	4	1
England	1995	5	2
England	1996	7	2
England	1997	0	0
England	1998	10	2
England	1999	1	0
England	2000	2	0
England	2001	1	0
Total		30	7

Scores and results list England's goal tally first, score column indicates score after each Anderton goal.

List of international goals scored by Darren Anderton
No.	Date	Venue	Cap	Opponent	Score	Result	Competition
1	17 May 1994	Wembley Stadium, London, England	2	Greece	1–0	5–0	Friendly
2	3 June 1995	Wembley Stadium, London, England	7	Japan	1–0	2–1	Umbro Cup
3	8 June 1995	Elland Road, Leeds, England	8	Sweden	3–3	3–3	Umbro Cup
4	18 May 1996	Wembley Stadium, London, England	10	Hungary	1–0	3–0	Friendly
5	18 May 1996	Wembley Stadium, London, England	10	Hungary	3–0	3–0	Friendly
6	26 June 1998	Stade Bollaert-Delelis, Lens, France	21	Colombia	1–0	2–0	1998 FIFA World Cup
7	18 November 1998	Wembley Stadium, London, England	26	Czech Republic	1–0	2–0	Friendly

== Honours ==
Tottenham Hotspur

- Football League Cup: 1998–99; runner-up: 2001–02

England U21

- Toulon Tournament: 1993
