= Carl Motteram =

English footballer

Personal information
- Date of birth: 3 September 1984 (age 42)
- Place of birth: Birmingham, England
- Position: Midfielder

Team information
- Current team: Solihull Moors

Youth career
- –2003: Birmingham City

Senior career*
Years	Team	Apps	(Gls)
2003–2006	Birmingham City	0	(0)
2005–2006	→ Tamworth (loan)	2	(0)
2006–2007	Torquay United	7	(0)
2007	Moor Green	3	(0)
2007–2008	Solihull Moors		
2009–20??	Stratford Town		
2016–Present	South Molton		
- * Club domestic league appearances and goals as of 11:51, 17 August 2007 (UTC)

Carl Motteram (born 3 September 1984) is an English professional footballer who plays as a midfielder for South Molton F.C. in the North Devon Premier League.

Moterram was born in Birmingham and joined Birmingham City as a 12-year-old. He progressed through the youth and trainee sides and turned professional in August 2003. He made the substitutes' bench for the trip to Tottenham Hotspur on 7 January 2004, but that was the closest he got to playing for Birmingham's first team.

He joined Conference club Tamworth on loan in November 2005 where he played for them against Hartlepool United on their FA Cup run. He then moved on to Torquay United on a free transfer in July 2006.

He made his Torquay debut in the League Cup defeat at home to Norwich City on 23 August 2006, coming on as a late substitute for Chris McPhee. He struggled to establish himself at Torquay, finding himself even further away from the starting line-up once Ian Atkins, who had signed him, was replaced by new manager Lubos Kubik. In December 2006 he was given a one-month extension to his contract, but on 22 January 2007 it was announced that he would be released at the end of the month.

He signed for Moor Green of the Conference North in February 2007. Moor Green merged with Solihull Borough in the summer of 2007 and Motteram was retained by the newly formed Solihull Moors.
