= 2001–02 Blackburn Rovers F.C. season =

Blackburn Rovers
2001–02 season
- Chairman: Robert Coar
- Manager: Graeme Souness
- FA Premier League: 10th
- FA Cup: Fifth round
- League Cup: Winners
- Top goalscorer: League: Matt Jansen (10); All: Matt Jansen (16)
- Average home league attendance: 25,984

During the 2001–02 English football season, Blackburn Rovers competed in the Premier League (known as the FA Barclaycard Premiership for sponsorship reasons).

== Season summary ==
Blackburn won just four of their first 14 league games, a run which also included seven draws and three defeats. However, they had little time to savour their Worthington Cup glory that resulted from a 2–1 win over Tottenham Hotspur on 24 February - they were deep in the relegation mire and occupying third place from bottom following a dreadful winter period, as they won two and lost ten in 12 games, the two wins seeing them do a decidedly one-sided double over Charlton Athletic (2–0 away and 4–1 home). But Graeme Souness inspired his side, bolstered by the arrival of striker Andy Cole, to a considerable turnaround in form - seeing them win six in their final 12 games - which saw them climb to 10th place in the final table. UEFA Cup qualification had already been achieved thanks to the Worthington Cup triumph, but the club's fans were left wondering whether it could have been achieved automatically had it not been for the club's dismal winter period. Especially, their league record produced four more defeats than wins in contrast to a final goal difference of +4, concluding them as a comprehensively winning team despite their inconsistency.

At the end of the season, striker Mark Hughes retired at the age of 38, after a playing career spanning 22 years that had yielded two league titles, four FA Cups, a Cup Winners' Cup and three League Cups.

== Final league table ==
Pos	Team	Pld	W	D	L	GF	GA	GD	Pts	Qualification or relegation
8	Aston Villa	38	12	14	12	46	47	−1	50	Qualification for the Intertoto Cup third round
9	Tottenham Hotspur	38	14	8	16	49	53	−4	50	
10	Blackburn Rovers	38	12	10	16	55	51	+4	46	Qualification for the UEFA Cup first round (Note: Blackburn Rovers qualified for the UEFA Cup as League Cup winners.)
11	Southampton	38	12	9	17	46	54	−8	45	
12	Middlesbrough	38	12	9	17	35	47	−12	45	

Source: Premier League
Rules for classification: 1) points; 2) goal difference; 3) number of goals scored.
Notes:

Results summary

Overall								Home						Away					
Pld	W	D	L	GF	GA	GD	Pts	W	D	L	GF	GA	GD	W	D	L	GF	GA	GD
38	12	10	16	55	51	+4	46	8	6	5	33	20	+13	4	4	11	22	31	−9

Source: Statto

Results by round

Round	1	2	3	4	5	6	7	8	9	10	11	12	13	14	15	16	17	18	19	20	21	22	23	24	25	26	27	28	29	30	31	32	33	34	35	36	37	38
Ground	A	H	H	A	A	H	H	A	H	A	H	A	H	A	H	H	A	A	H	H	A	H	A	H	A	A	A	H	H	A	A	H	H	A	H	A	A	H
Result	L	D	W	L	D	D	W	L	W	D	D	W	D	D	L	L	L	W	L	L	L	W	L	L	L	L	D	W	W	L	L	W	D	W	D	W	L	W
Position	14	15	8	13	13	12	6	11	8	10	10	7	7	10	10	14	15	12	14	14	15	14	15	17	17	18	18	18	15	16	17	17	17	16	15	12	12	10

Source: Statto.com
A = Away; H = Home; W = Win; D = Draw; L = Loss

== Results ==
Blackburn Rovers' score comes first

=== Legend ===
Win	Draw	Loss

=== FA Premier League ===
Date	Opponent	Venue	Result	Attendance	Scorers
18 August 2001	Derby County	A	1–2	28,236	Blake
22 August 2001	Manchester United	H	2–2	29,836	Beckham (o.g.), Gillespie
25 August 2001	Tottenham Hotspur	H	2–1	24,992	Mahon, Duff
8 September 2001	Sunderland	A	0–1	45,103	
16 September 2001	Ipswich Town	A	1–1	22,126	Jansen
19 September 2001	Bolton Wanderers	H	1–1	25,949	Neill
22 September 2001	Everton	H	1–0	27,732	Grabbi
30 September 2001	Aston Villa	A	0–2	28,623	
14 October 2001	West Ham United	H	7–1	22,712	Flitcroft, Dunn, Johnson, McCann (o.g.), Tugay, Jansen, Hignett
20 October 2001	Arsenal	A	3–3	38,108	Van Bronckhorst (o.g.), Dunn (2)
29 October 2001	Leicester City	H	0–0	21,873	
3 November 2001	Southampton	A	2–1	30,523	Tugay, Hignett
17 November 2001	Liverpool	H	1–1	28,859	Jansen
24 November 2001	Chelsea	A	0–0	37,978	
1 December 2001	Middlesbrough	H	0–1	23,849	
9 December 2001	Leeds United	H	1–2	28,309	Berg
15 December 2001	Newcastle United	A	1–2	50,064	Dunn
22 December 2001	Charlton Athletic	A	2–0	25,857	Duff, Dunn
26 December 2001	Sunderland	H	0–3	29,869	
29 December 2001	Derby County	H	0–1	23,529	
1 January 2002	Tottenham Hotspur	A	0–1	35,131	
12 January 2002	Charlton Athletic	H	4–1	23,365	Tugay, Cole, Hignett, Jansen
19 January 2002	Manchester United	A	1–2	67,552	Hignett
30 January 2002	Arsenal	H	2–3	25,893	Jansen (2)
2 February 2002	West Ham United	A	0–2	35,307	
9 February 2002	Fulham	A	0–2	19,580	
2 March 2002	Bolton Wanderers	A	1–1	27,203	Jansen
5 March 2002	Aston Villa	H	3–0	21,988	Dunn, Duff, Cole
13 March 2002	Ipswich Town	H	2–1	23,305	Duff, Cole
17 March 2002	Leeds United	A	1–3	39,857	Jansen
30 March 2002	Leicester City	A	1–2	16,236	Hughes
1 April 2002	Southampton	H	2–0	28,851	Duff, Yordi
10 April 2002	Chelsea	H	0–0	25,441	
20 April 2002	Middlesbrough	A	3–1	26,932	Yordi, Cole, Dunn (pen.)
23 April 2002	Newcastle United	H	2–2	26,712	Gillespie, Cole
28 April 2002	Everton	A	2–1	34,976	Jansen, Cole
8 May 2002	Liverpool	A	3–4	40,663	Duff, Cole, Jansen
11 May 2002	Fulham	H	3–0	30,487	Cole (2), Duff

=== FA Cup ===
Round	Date	Opponent	Venue	Result	Attendance	Goalscorers
R3	5 January 2002	Barnsley	A	1–1	12,314	Hignett
R3R	16 January 2002	Barnsley	H	3–1	10,203	Grabbi, Dunn (pen.), Johansson
R4	26 January 2002	Millwall	A	1–0	15,004	Cole
R5	16 February 2002	Middlesbrough	A	0–1	20,921	

=== League Cup ===
Round	Date	Opponent	Venue	Result	Attendance	Goalscorers
R2	12 September 2001	Oldham Athletic	H	2–0	9,559	Jansen, Dunning
R3	10 October 2001	Middlesbrough	H	2–1 (a.e.t.)	9,536	Hignett, Short
R4	28 November 2001	Manchester City	H	2–0	17,907	Johansson, Johnson
R5	11 December 2001	Arsenal	H	4–0	13,278	Jansen (3), Hughes
SF First Leg	8 January 2002	Sheffield Wednesday	A	2–1	30,883	Hignett, Cole
SF Second Leg	22 January 2002	Sheffield Wednesday	H	4–2 (won 6–3 on agg)	26,844	Jansen, Duff, Cole, Hignett
F	24 February 2002	Tottenham Hotspur	N	2–1	72,500	Jansen, Cole

== First-team squad ==
Squad at end of season

Note: Flags indicate national team as defined under FIFA eligibility rules; some limited exceptions apply. Players may hold more than one non-FIFA nationality.

No.	Pos.	Nation	Player
1	GK	USA	Brad Friedel
2	DF	ENG	John Curtis
3	MF	TUR	Tugay Kerimoğlu
4	DF	NOR	Henning Berg (Vice captain)
5	DF	NOR	Stig Inge Bjørnebye
6	DF	ENG	Craig Short
7	MF	ENG	Garry Flitcroft (captain)
8	MF	ENG	David Dunn
9	FW	ENG	Andy Cole
10	FW	ENG	Matt Jansen
11	MF	IRL	Damien Duff
12	FW	WAL	Mark Hughes
14	DF	SWE	Nils-Eric Johansson
15	MF	ENG	Craig Hignett

No.	Pos.	Nation	Player
16	MF	IRL	Alan Mahon
17	FW	ESP	Yordi (on loan from Real Zaragoza)
18	MF	NIR	Keith Gillespie
20	FW	NOR	Egil Østenstad
21	FW	ITA	Corrado Grabbi
22	DF	TUR	Hakan Ünsal
23	GK	IRL	Alan Kelly
24	MF	ENG	Darren Dunning
27	GK	ENG	Alan Miller
28	DF	ENG	Martin Taylor
29	MF	IRL	Jonathan Douglas
30	DF	SCO	Gordon Greer
31	DF	AUS	Lucas Neill

=== Left club during season ===
Note: Flags indicate national team as defined under FIFA eligibility rules; some limited exceptions apply. Players may hold more than one non-FIFA nationality.

No.	Pos.	Nation	Player
9	FW	ENG	Marcus Bent (to Ipswich Town)
13	GK	AUS	John Filan (to Wigan Athletic)
14	FW	WAL	Nathan Blake (to Wolverhampton Wanderers)
17	MF	IRL	Jason McAteer (to Sunderland)

No.	Pos.	Nation	Player
19	MF	NIR	Damien Johnson (to Birmingham City)
22	DF	IRL	Jeff Kenna (to Birmingham City)
29	DF	ENG	Marlon Broomes (to Sheffield Wednesday)
—	DF	IRL	Fred Murray (to Cambridge United)

=== Reserve squad ===
Note: Flags indicate national team as defined under FIFA eligibility rules; some limited exceptions apply. Players may hold more than one non-FIFA nationality.

No.	Pos.	Nation	Player
25	DF	ENG	Simon Grayson
26	FW	WAL	James Thomas
32	GK	ENG	Ryan Robinson
34	FW	ENG	Marc Richards
—	DF	SCO	David McNamee

No.	Pos.	Nation	Player
—	MF	ENG	Jimmy Corbett
—	MF	ENG	Neil Danns
—	MF	SCO	Burton O'Brien
—	MF	USA	Jemal Johnson

== Transfers ==
=== In ===
Date	Nation	Position	Name	Club From	Fee	Reference
11 May 2001	(Scotland)	DF	Gordon Greer	Clyde	£250k	
17 May 2001	(Turkey)	MF	Tugay Kerimoğlu	Rangers	£1.3 million	
18 June 2001	(Italy)	FW	Corrado Grabbi	Ternana	£7 million	
29 June 2001	(Republic of Ireland)	MF	Alan Mahon	Sporting CP	£1.5 million	
7 September 2001	(Australia)	DF	Lucas Neill	Millwall	£600k	
5 October 2001	(Sweden)	DF	Nils-Eric Johansson	Nurenburg	Undisclosed	
29 December 2001	(England)	FW	Andy Cole	Manchester United	£7.6 million	
21 February 2002	(Turkey)	DF	Hakan Ünsal	Galatasaray	Undisclosed	

=== Out ===
Date	Nation	Position	Name	Club To	Fee	Reference
13 September 2001	(Wales)	FW	Nathan Blake	Wolverhampton Wanderers	£1.5 million	
19 October 2001	(Republic of Ireland)	MF	Jason McAteer	Sunderland	Undisclosed	
23 November 2001	(England)	FW	Marcus Bent	Ipswich Town	Undisclosed	
12 December 2001	(England)	DF	Marlon Broomes	Sheffield Wednesday	Free Transfer	
14 December 2001	(Australia)	GK	John Filan	Wigan Athletic	£600k	
1 February 2002	(Republic of Ireland)	DF	Jeff Kenna	Birmingham City	Free transfer	
8 March 2002	(Northern Ireland)	MF	Damien Johnson	Birmingham City	Undisclosed	

=== Loans In ===
Date	Nation	Position	Name	Club From	Length	Reference
20 February 2002	(Spain)	FW	Yordi	Real Zaragoza	Until end of season	

=== Loans Out ===
Date	Nation	Position	Name	Club To	Length	Reference
4 September 2001	(England)	DF	Simon Grayson	Notts County	One Month	
6 September 2001	(England)	DF	Marlon Broomes	Grimsby Town	One Month	
10 October 2001	(England)	GK	Alan Miller	St Johnstone	Three Months	
13 February 2002	(England)	DF	Simon Grayson	Bradford City	One Month	

== Statistics ==
=== Appearances and goals ===
No.	Pos	Nat	Player	Total		Premier League		FA Cup		League Cup	
No.	Pos	Nat	Player	Apps	Goals	Apps	Goals	Apps	Goals	Apps	Goals
Goalkeepers
1	GK	(United States) USA	Brad Friedel	45	0	36	0	3	0	6	0
23	GK	(Republic of Ireland) IRL	Alan Kelly	3	0	2	0	1	0	0	0
Defenders
2	DF	(England) ENG	John Curtis	16	0	10	0	1	0	5	0
4	DF	(Norway) NOR	Henning Berg	38	1	34	1	2	0	2	0
5	DF	(Norway) NOR	Stig Inge Bjørnebye	29	0	23	0	2	0	4	0
6	DF	(England) ENG	Craig Short	26	1	21+1	0	2	0	2	1
14	DF	(Sweden) SWE	Nils-Eric Johansson	28	2	14+6	0	3	1	5	1
22	DF	(Turkey) TUR	Hakan Ünsal	8	0	7+1	0	0	0	0	0
28	DF	(England) ENG	Martin Taylor	29	0	12+7	0	3+1	0	6	0
30	DF	(Scotland) SCO	Gordon Greer	1	0	0	0	0	0	1	0
31	DF	(Australia) AUS	Lucas Neill	31	5	31	1	0	4	0	0
Midfielders
3	MF	(Turkey) TUR	Tugay Kerimoğlu	43	3	32+1	3	3+1	0	5+1	0
7	MF	(England) ENG	Garry Flitcroft	32	1	26+3	1	1	0	2	0
8	MF	(England) ENG	David Dunn	36	8	26+3	7	2	1	5	0
11	MF	(Republic of Ireland) IRL	Damien Duff	39	8	31+1	7	1+1	0	5	1
12	MF	(Wales) WAL	Mark Hughes	30	2	4+17	1	1+2	0	4+2	1
15	MF	(England) ENG	Craig Hignett	29	8	4+16	4	2+1	1	5+1	3
16	MF	(Republic of Ireland) IRL	Alan Mahon	22	1	10+3	1	3	0	3+3	0
18	MF	(Northern Ireland) NIR	Keith Gillespie	39	2	21+11	2	2+1	0	3+1	0
24	MF	(England) ENG	Darren Dunning	1	1	0	0	0	0	1	1
29	MF	(Republic of Ireland) IRL	Jonathan Douglas	1	0	0	0	0+1	0	0	0
Forwards
9	FW	(England) ENG	Andy Cole	20	13	15	9	2	1	3	3
10	FW	(England) ENG	Matt Jansen	43	16	34+1	10	2+1	0	4+1	6
17	FW	(Spain) ESP	Yordi	9	2	5+3	2	0	0	0+1	0
20	FW	(Norway) NOR	Egil Østenstad	7	0	2+2	0	1	0	0+2	0
21	FW	(Italy) ITA	Corrado Grabbi	19	2	10+4	1	1+1	1	1+2	0
Left club during season
9	FW	(England) ENG	Marcus Bent	10	0	1+8	0	0	0	0+1	0
13	GK	(Australia) AUS	John Filan	1	0	0	0	0	0	1	0
14	FW	(Wales) WAL	Nathan Blake	3	1	0+3	1	0	0	0	0
17	MF	(Republic of Ireland) IRL	Jason McAteer	4	0	1+3	0	0	0	0	0
19	MF	(Northern Ireland) NIR	Damien Johnson	12	2	6+1	1	2	0	3	1
22	DF	(Republic of Ireland) IRL	Jeff Kenna	1	0	0	0	0	0	1	0

=== Top scorers ===
==== Premier League ====
- (England) Matt Jansen 10
- (England) Andy Cole 9
- (Republic of Ireland) Damien Duff 7
- (England) David Dunn 7
- (England) Craig Hignett 4

== Football League Cup Final line-up ==
24 February 2002
14:00

Blackburn Rovers	2 – 1	Tottenham Hotspur
Jansen 25'; Cole 69'	Report	Ziege 33'

Millennium Stadium, Cardiff
Attendance: 72,500
Referee: Graham Poll (Hertfordshire)

Blackburn Rovers	Tottenham Hotspur

GK	1	(United States) Brad Friedel
RB	28	(England) Martin Taylor
CB	4	(Norway) Henning Berg (c)
CB	14	(Sweden) Nils-Eric Johansson
LB	5	(Norway) Stig Inge Bjørnebye
RM	18	(Northern Ireland) Keith Gillespie	(substituted off) 75'
CM	8	(England) David Dunn
CM	12	(Wales) Mark Hughes
LM	11	(Republic of Ireland) Damien Duff
CF	10	(England) Matt Jansen	(substituted off) 74'
CF	9	(England) Andy Cole
Substitutes:
GK	27	(England) Alan Miller
DF	2	(England) John Curtis
MF	15	(England) Craig Hignett	(substituted on) 75'
MF	16	(Republic of Ireland) Alan Mahon
FW	17	(Spain) Yordi	(substituted on) 74'
Manager:
(Scotland) Graeme Souness

GK	1	(Scotland) Neil Sullivan
RB	18	(Wales) Ben Thatcher
CB	6	(England) Chris Perry
CB	26	(England) Ledley King
LB	3	(Argentina) Mauricio Taricco		(yellow card) (substituted off) 79'
RM	7	(England) Darren Anderton
CM	8	(England) Tim Sherwood	Yellow card
CM	14	(Uruguay) Gustavo Poyet		(substituted off) 84'
LM	23	(Germany) Christian Ziege	Yellow card
CF	10	(England) Teddy Sheringham (c)
CF	9	(England) Les Ferdinand
Substitutes:
GK	13	(United States) Kasey Keller
DF	30	(England) Anthony Gardner
MF	29	(Wales) Simon Davies		(substituted on) 79'
FW	11	(Ukraine) Serhii Rebrov
FW	16	(Norway) Steffen Iversen		(substituted on) 84'
Manager:
(England) Glenn Hoddle
