= Saint John Henry Newman Catholic School =

Saint John Henry Newman Catholic School may refer to:

- The Saint John Henry Newman Catholic School, Stevenage, in Hertfordshire, England
- St John Henry Newman Catholic School, Carlisle, in Cumbria, England
- St. John Henry Newman Catholic High School, in Toronto, Ontario, Canada
- St. John Henry Newman Catholic Secondary School, in Hamilton, Ontario, Canada
