= Egil Østenstad =

Norwegian footballer (born 1972)

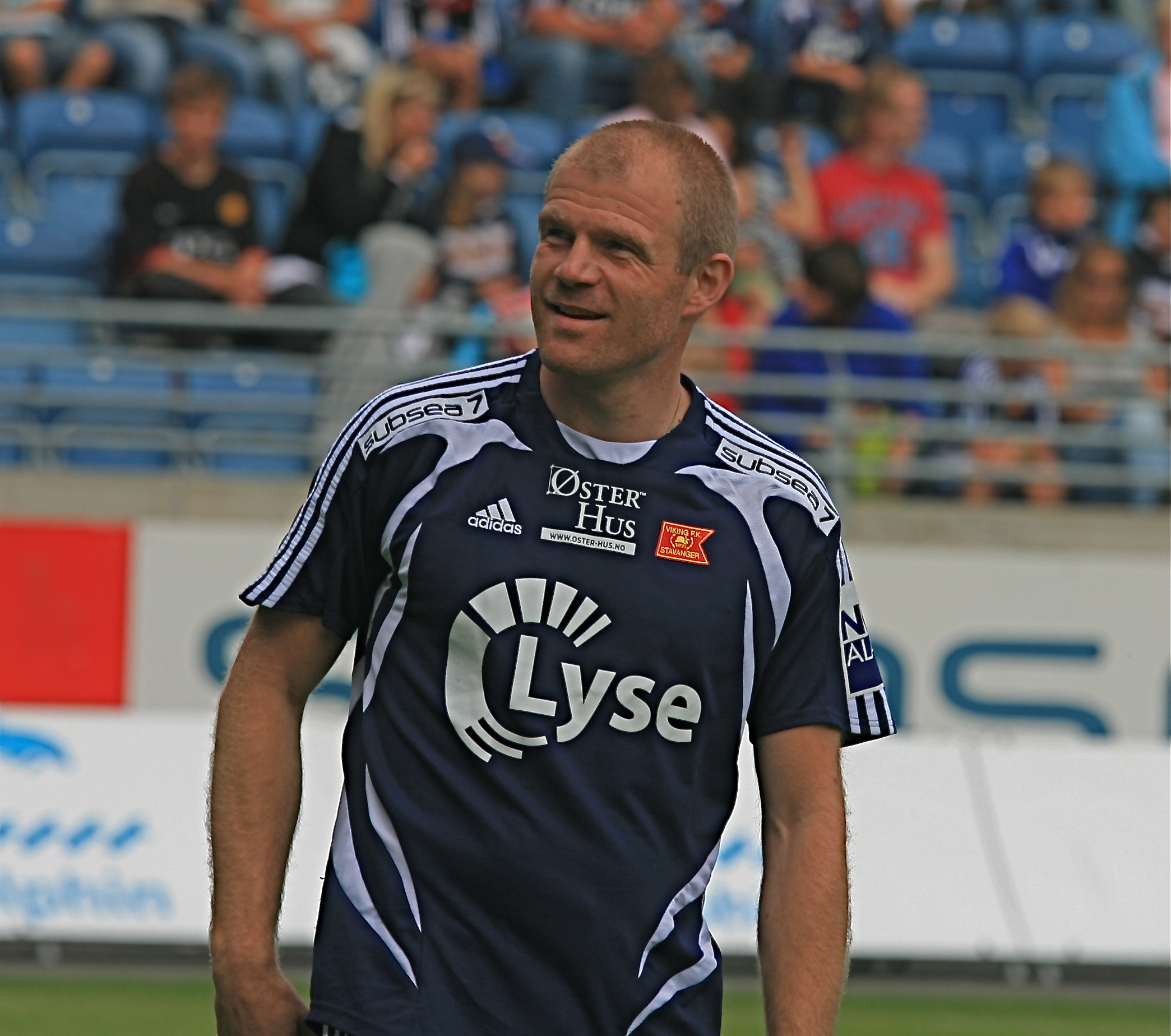
- Østenstad in 2008

Personal information
- Full name: Egil Johan Østenstad
- Date of birth: 2 January 1972 (age 54)
- Place of birth: Haugesund, Norway
- Height: 1.83 m (6 ft 0 in)
- Position: Forward

Youth career
- Torvastad IL

Senior career*
Years	Team	Apps	(Gls)
1990–1996	Viking FK	128	(54)
1996–1999	Southampton	96	(29)
1999–2003	Blackburn Rovers	62	(11)
2001	→ Manchester City (loan)	4	(0)
2003–2004	Rangers	11	(0)
2004–2005	Viking FK	33	(16)
Total		334	(111)

International career
1987	Norway U15	12	(4)
1988	Norway U16	4	(0)
1989–1990	Norway U18	8	(5)
1989–1993	Norway U18	27	(8)
1993–2005	Norway	18	(6)
- * Club domestic league appearances and goals

Egil Johan Østenstad (Norwegian pronunciation: [ˈèːɡiːl ˈœ̀stn̩stɑː]; born 2 January 1972) is a Norwegian former professional footballer who played as a forward.

He started and ended his career at Viking, before going on to play in the Premier League for Southampton, Blackburn Rovers and Manchester City. In 2003 he made a move to the Scottish Premier League with Rangers before finishing his career back with Viking in 2005. He was capped 18 times by Norway, scoring 6 goals.

Following his retirement he was appointed director of football at Viking and remained in the position until stepping down in 2011.

== Club career ==
=== Viking FK ===
Born in Haugesund, Østenstad started his career with local club Torvastad IL.

Østenstad made his international debut for Norway in 1987 on the U-15 level, and won several youth caps up to U21 level.

He arrived at Viking FK in 1990, and helped the club to win the Eliteserien title in 1991, when he featured in 10 out of the 22 league games. He played a total of 280 games for the club, scoring 88 goals, before moving to Southampton in the FA Premier League in October 1996.

=== Southampton ===
Østenstad was signed by manager Graeme Souness for £800,000 on 3 October 1996 and made his debut at Coventry City on 13 October 1996. In only his third game for the Saints he opened his goal-scoring account in spectacular fashion with a hat-trick in the 6–3 win against Manchester United on 26 October 1996. Subsequently, the Dubious Goals Committee credited his third goal to an own goal by Phil Neville, who touched the ball last in a vain attempt to prevent it from crossing the goal-line, although Østenstad retained the match ball.

In his first season at The Dell he led the line well linking up superbly with Matthew Le Tissier and Eyal Berkovic scoring nine goals from 30 league appearances and was voted the Fans' player of the season. During the 1997 close season, Østenstad was a transfer target for Liverpool and Newcastle United, but Østenstad remained at The Dell as neither club was willing to match Southampton's £7 million asking price.

By the start of the following season, Souness had departed to be replaced by Dave Jones from Stockport County. Unfortunately, Eyal Berkovic also departed thus breaking up what had looked like becoming a successful partnership. Østenstad was now paired with Kevin Davies in attack but failed to score until a substitute appearance against West Ham United on 4 October 1997. Following the signing of David Hirst he was dropped from the team, making only the occasional substitute appearance. After coming off the bench to score in a 3–2 victory over Liverpool on 7 February 1998, he started the remaining 13 league games, scoring eight goals as the Saints finished the 1997–98 season in 11th place.

Østenstad was part of the Norway squad for the 1998 World Cup held in France, but was given little chance to make any impact.

In the 1998 close season, Kevin Davies departed for Blackburn Rovers, with James Beattie joining the Saints as part of the deal. Østenstad was now paired up front with veteran striker Mark Hughes. The 1998–99 season saw Saints struggle to score goals and they were never out of the relegation zone until the last two weeks of the season. Despite only scoring seven goals, Østenstad was Saints top goal-scorer for the season (jointly with Matthew Le Tissier), but by the end of the season he had lost his starting place in the team to Marians Pahars.

Østenstad started the 1999–2000 season brightly, scoring the only goal at Coventry City in the opening game on 7 August 1999. 11 days later, Dave Jones decided to move him on and arranged an exchange deal with Blackburn Rovers with Kevin Davies returning to The Dell. This move saw him drop down a division, as Rovers had just been relegated to Division One.

In his three years at the Saints, Østenstad scored 28 goals in 96 league appearances, plus a further five goals in 13 cup games. He was always a popular figure, but sometimes infuriated fans by seeming to miss as many "easy" goals as he scored difficult ones.

=== Blackburn Rovers ===
Despite being re-united with manager Graeme Souness and dropping down a division, Østenstad struggled to make an impact at Ewood Park. He started well, scoring a brace in his second game, in a 2–0 victory at Norwich City on 28 August 1999 and completed the 1999–2000 season with eight league goals from 28 appearances, playing alongside Ashley Ward and Lee Carsley.

The goals then started to dry up and the following season he only made 13 appearances for Blackburn with three goals. By now, Blackburn were relying on goals from Matt Jansen and David Dunn to see them to promotion. He spent the end of the 2000–01 season on loan at Manchester City (where he made four appearances with no goals).

In the 2001–02 season Østenstad only made four appearances in the Premier League. Rovers won the 2001–02 Football League Cup and despite being left out of the squad for the final, Østenstad did appear in some of the earlier rounds. In the following season, he appeared more regularly and, despite only one league goal in 17 appearances, he did score in a UEFA Cup game against CSKA Sofia.

In his four seasons at Blackburn, he made a total of 62 league appearances scoring 12 goals.

=== Rangers ===
Østenstad signed for Rangers on a free transfer by Alex McLeish in the summer of 2003. However, he made next to no impact during a very unproductive spell and wound up having his contract terminated before the end of the season. His only two goals at Rangers came in the League Cup in games against Forfar Athletic and St Johnstone.

=== Return to Viking ===
After his disappointing season at Rangers, he made a long-awaited return to Viking midway through the 2004 season.

He was an instant hit at his old club, scoring three goals in nine games to help save the club from relegation. Although he continued to be a regular starter and a prolific goalscorer, Østenstad retired at the end of the 2005 season. An internet petition for him to stay on for another season collected close to 2500 signatures.

== International career ==
Østenstad made his debut for the Norway national team in 1993, coming on as a substitute to score twice against the Faroe Islands. He was capped 17 times between 1993 and 1999, mostly as a substitute, and he played in the 1998 World Cup in France. Østenstad scored six times for Norway, making him the most efficient marksman in the history of the Norway national team with one goal in every 94 minutes played. On 7 September 2005, more than six years after his last appearance, he made his comeback with the national team, starting in a 2–1 defeat to Scotland.

== Career outside football ==
Østenstad retired after the 2005 season. He was the director of football for Viking, until he stepped down on 8 June 2011. Østenstad was also the inspiration for the character "Yngve" in the book The Man Who Loved Yngve by Tore Renberg. The author and Østenstad went to the same high school.

As of 2024, Østenstad is a key employee of the Haaland family's financial dealings, mainly via his friendship with Erling Haaland's father, Alf-Inge. He is chairman of the latter's investment firm, Tyrannus.

== Career statistics ==
Appearances and goals by club, season and competition
Club	Season	League	League		National cup (Note: Includes FA Cup, Scottish Cup, Norwegian Football Cup.)		League cup (Note: Includes Football League Cup and Scottish League Cup.)		Continental (Note: Includes Champions League, UEFA Cup.)		Total	
Club	Season	League	Apps.	Goals	Apps.	Goals	Apps.	Goals	Apps.	Goals	Apps.	Goals
Viking	1990	Tippeligaen	10	1	3	0	–		–		13	1
Viking	1991	Tippeligaen	10	1	1	0	–		–		11	1
Viking	1992	Tippeligaen	20	1	5	2	–		2	0	27	3
Viking	1993	Tippeligaen	22	10	5	3	–		–		27	13
Viking	1994	Tippeligaen	21	6	4	8	–		–		25	14
Viking	1995	Tippeligaen	21	12	1	0	–		3	1	25	13
Viking	1996	Tippeligaen	24	23	4	3	–		–		28	26
Viking	Total		128	54	23	16	–		5	1	156	71
Southampton	1996–97	Premier League	30	10	1	1	6	3	–		37	14
Southampton	1997–98	Premier League	29	11	1	0	1	0	–		31	11
Southampton	1998–99	Premier League	34	7	2	1	2	0	–		38	8
Southampton	1999–2000	Premier League	3	1	0	0	0	0	–		3	1
Southampton	Total		96	29	4	2	9	3	0	0	109	34
Blackburn	1999–2000	Football League First Division	28	8	2	0	1	0	–		31	8
Blackburn	2000–01	Football League First Division	13	2	1	0	4	1	–		18	3
Blackburn	2001–02	Premier League	4	0	1	0	2	0	–		7	0
Blackburn	2002–03	Premier League	17	1	3	0	2	0	3	1	25	2
Blackburn	Total		62	11	7	0	9	1	3	1	81	13
Manchester City (loan)	2000–01	Premier League	4	0	0	0	0	0	–		4	0
Rangers	2003–04	Scottish Premier League	11	0	1	0	3	2	2	0	17	2
Viking	2004	Tippeligaen	8	2	0	0	–		–		8	2
Viking	2005	Tippeligaen	25	14	2	0	–		10	1	37	15
Viking	Total		33	16	2	0	–		10	1	45	17
Career total			334	110	37	18	21	6	20	3	412	137

== Bibliography ==
- Duncan Holley & Gary Chalk (2003). In That Number – A post-war chronicle of Southampton FC. Hagiology Publishing. ISBN 0-9534474-3-X.
