= Martin Taylor (footballer, born 1979) =

English footballer

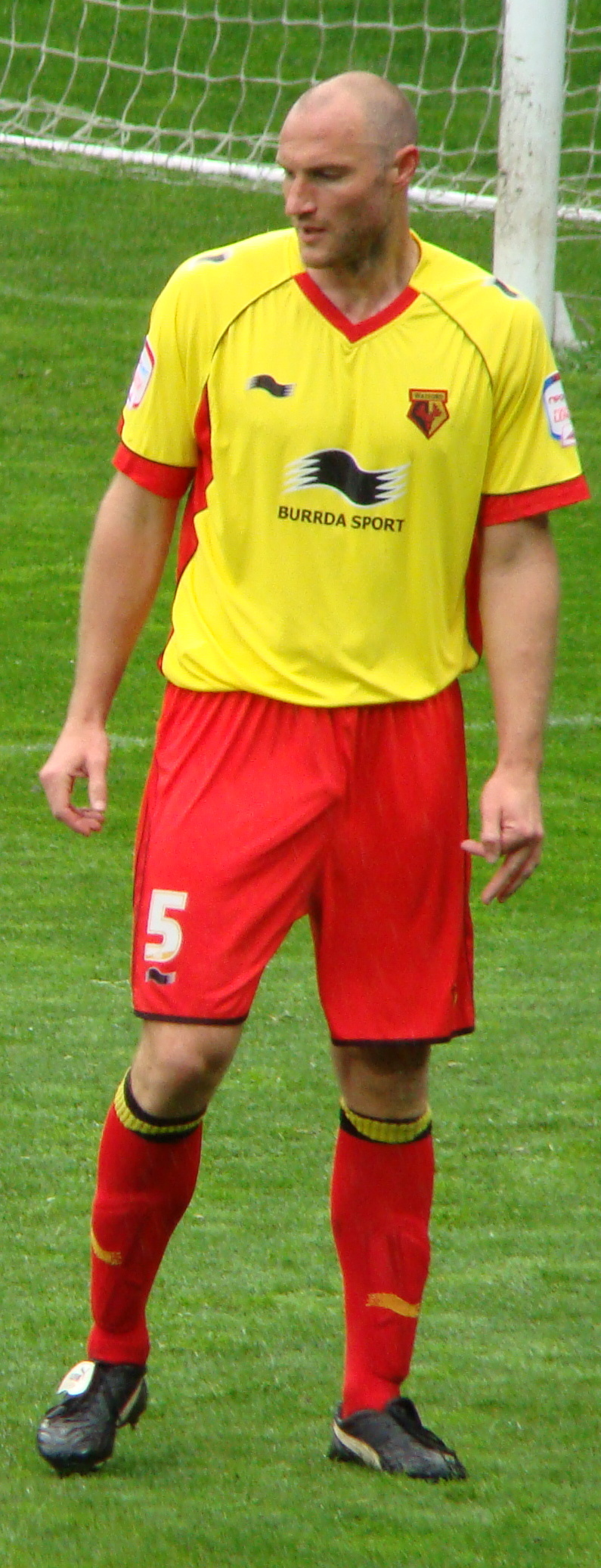
- Taylor playing for Watford in 2012

Personal information
- Full name: Martin Taylor
- Date of birth: 9 November 1979 (age 47)
- Place of birth: Ashington, Northumberland, England
- Height: 6 ft 4 in (1.93 m)
- Position: Defender

Youth career
- –1997: Cramlington Juniors

Senior career*
| Years | Team | Apps | (Gls) |
| 1997–2004 | Blackburn Rovers | 88 | (5) |
| 2000 | → Darlington (loan) | 4 | (0) |
| 2000 | → Stockport County (loan) | 7 | (0) |
| 2004–2010 | Birmingham City | 99 | (2) |
| 2007 | → Norwich City (loan) | 8 | (1) |
| 2010–2012 | Watford | 90 | (10) |
| 2012–2014 | Sheffield Wednesday | 11 | (0) |
| 2013 | → Brentford (loan) | 5 | (2) |
| Total | | 312 | (20) |

International career
| 1998 | England U18 | 3 | (0) |
| 2001 | England U21 | 1 | (0) |
- * Club domestic league appearances and goals

Martin Taylor (born 9 November 1979) is an English retired footballer who played as a defender.

Taylor began his career with Blackburn Rovers, for whom he made more than 100 appearances, and also spent time on loan at Darlington and Stockport County. While a Blackburn player, he was capped once for the England under-21 team and played on the winning side in the 2002 Football League Cup final. Taylor moved to Birmingham City in 2004, where he spent six seasons, and played for Norwich City on loan. He was involved in an incident in 2008 in which Arsenal player Eduardo da Silva suffered a badly broken leg. Unable to force his way into Birmingham's first team after their return to the Premier League, he joined Watford in January 2010. Taylor quickly established himself in Watford's first team, starting every league game in the 2010–11 season, but injury disrupted his next season, and he joined Sheffield Wednesday in August 2012. He played infrequently for Wednesday, spent time on loan at Brentford, and was released at the end of the 2013–14 season, and subsequently retired.

== Club career ==
=== Blackburn Rovers ===
Taylor was born in Ashington, Northumberland, and attended Cramlington High School. He played football for Cramlington Juniors before joining Blackburn Rovers as a schoolboy at the age of 17, signing his first full contract at the start of the 1997–98 season.

Loan spells at Darlington and Stockport served to improve his self-belief, and in May 2001 he won his first and only cap for the England under-21 side, as a half-time substitute for John Terry in a 3–0 friendly win against Mexico. Though brought into the squad for the 2002 European under-21 championships to replace the injured Ledley King, he made no further international appearances.

Also in 2002, he played throughout Blackburn's League Cup campaign, culminating in a 2–1 victory over Tottenham Hotspur at the Millennium Stadium.

Blackburn manager Graeme Souness felt that Taylor had enough ability to reach the top, but had for some time believed that without adopting a more aggressive physical approach – one befitting his 6 ft 4 in (1.93 m) frame, which caused his teammates to nickname him "Tiny" – he would not fulfil his potential. He had been viewed as a potential replacement for defenders Henning Berg and Craig Short, but, as Berg left the side, Souness signed Lorenzo Amoruso, because he felt that Blackburn needed experienced centre-backs, and then took Markus Babbel on loan.

Though injuries among his defenders made him reluctant to sell, Souness needed to generate transfer funds, so in January 2004, Blackburn accepted a £1.25 million bid from Birmingham City.

=== Birmingham City ===
On 2 February 2004, Taylor left Blackburn for Birmingham City, signing a contract due to end in 2007. He linked up with former Blackburn teammates David Dunn and Damien Johnson highlighted Taylor's footballing ability and comfort on the ball. Rob Kelly, then head of youth coaching at Blackburn, while complimentary about his reading of the game and ability with both feet, felt that working with Birmingham manager Steve Bruce, a former top-class centre-half, in new surroundings might help bring out his unfulfilled potential, an assessment with which Taylor himself agreed.

He made his Birmingham debut in a 3–0 victory against Everton, and in his next game, a 3–1 victory against Middlesbrough, he scored his first league goal for the club. Unable to dislodge the established central defensive partnership of Matthew Upson and Kenny Cunningham, he played regularly for the remainder of the season, but mainly in his less favoured position of right back.

When Bruce brought Taylor to Birmingham he mentioned his admiration for the player's ability to play in any defensive position; this versatility ideally suited him to a backup role in the event of injury to any of the first choice defenders. In the 2004–05 season, the form and fitness of Upson and Cunningham, together with the arrival of Dutch international fullback Mario Melchiot from Chelsea, considerably restricted Taylor's appearances. In the second half of the 2005–06 season he had a long run in the side due to Upson's ankle injury, a run which coincided with some of Birmingham's better performances.

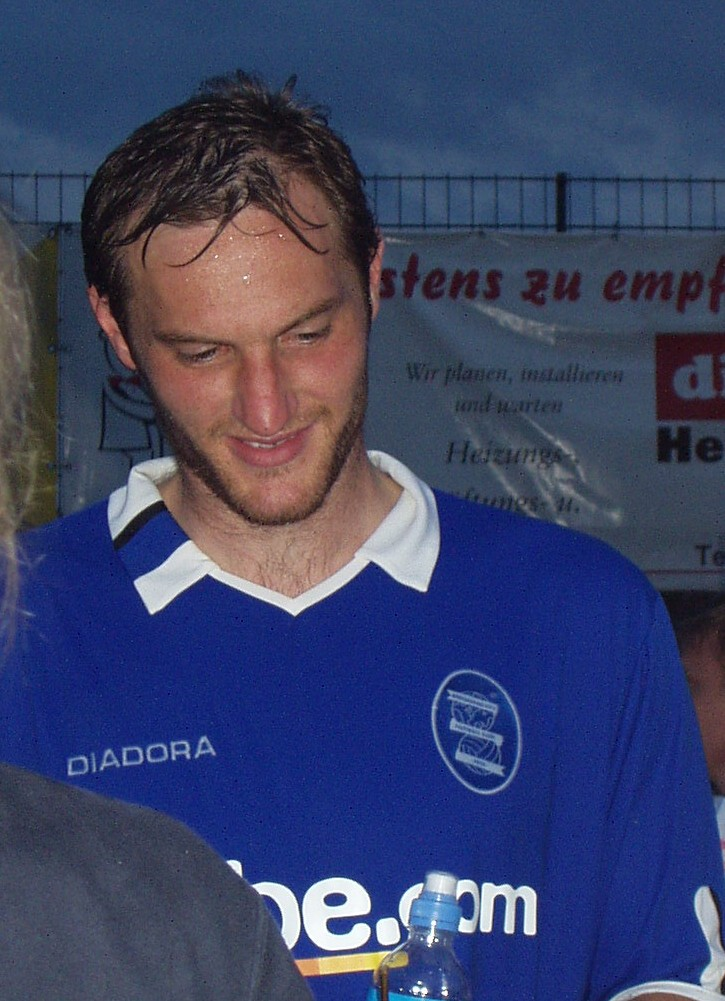
Taylor in Birmingham City colours, 2004

The departure of Cunningham and Melchiot following Birmingham's relegation from the Premier League, with Upson still injured long-term, provided an opportunity for Taylor to establish his first-team place alongside newly arrived Bruno Ngotty. But Bruce also recruited Tunisian international Radhi Jaïdi, and preferred the more robust physical approach of Olivier Tébily while Jaïdi built up match fitness. However, Ngotty's suspension proved the catalyst for an upturn in fortunes for Taylor. He was named captain after Damien Johnson suffered a broken jaw, and his rapport with fellow centre-back Jaïdi helped Birmingham to maintain a strong position in the Championship in the 2006–07 season. In recognition of his value to the club, in April 2007 he signed a new three-year contract with an option for a further two years.

==== Norwich City loan ====
With Birmingham back in the Premier League for 2007–08, competition for places meant that Taylor did not play in a single league game in the first two months of the season. On 1 November 2007, he became new Norwich City manager Glenn Roeder's first signing, joining on a month's loan. In his debut game, against East Anglian rivals Ipswich Town three days later, Taylor played a large role in his side's first goal: his header was deflected in off defender Owen Garvan, who was credited with an own goal. Taylor scored with a diving header against Blackpool and added considerable solidity at the back for Norwich. Though Norwich hoped to extend the loan, this was not possible, so Taylor returned to Birmingham at the end of the initial month.

Following Alex McLeish's arrival as Birmingham manager, Taylor was told that he was surplus to requirements; the club accepted an offer from Queens Park Rangers, reported at £1.25 million, but the player rejected it. However, injury to Rafael Schmitz, Jaïdi's absence on international duty and McLeish's failure to sign any of his defensive targets gave Taylor a first league start of the season in a 1–1 draw with Derby County in January 2008. He kept his place for the next match despite the availability of Schmitz and Jaïdi, and his impressive form left him in McLeish's plans for the remainder of the season.

==== Eduardo broken leg incident ====
On 23 February 2008, in the third minute of Birmingham's home match against Arsenal, Taylor committed a foul on Croatian international striker Eduardo da Silva as a result of which Eduardo suffered a compound fracture to his left fibula and an open dislocation of his left ankle. He received treatment on the field for seven minutes before undergoing surgery at a local hospital, and was transferred to a London hospital the following day. The injury was so disturbing that Sky Sports, who were broadcasting the game live, decided not to show replays of the incident. Taylor was sent off for the offence.

In his post-match interview, Arsenal manager Arsène Wenger called for a life ban for Taylor, but retracted his remarks later that day, admitting they had been excessive and made in the heat of the moment. Shortly after the match, Birmingham City issued a statement asserting Taylor's lack of malicious intent and his distress at the injury, and sending their best wishes to Eduardo. While Croatia captain Niko Kovač referred to the "brutality" of the incident and death threats appeared on the internet, Birmingham manager Alex McLeish and Arsenal striker Nicklas Bendtner, a former teammate of Taylor's, insisted that he was not a malicious player, and former manager Steve Bruce claimed that some might question whether Taylor even deserved a booking.

At president Sepp Blatter's personal request, FIFA's disciplinary chairman reviewed the matter, suggesting that the Football Association increase Taylor's punishment from the standard three-match ban; they refused to do so as there was no suggestion of intent.

=== Watford ===
Taylor joined Championship club Watford on a free transfer on 29 January 2010. He signed a two-and-a-half-year contract. He made his Watford debut on 2 February, playing the full 90 minutes against Sheffield United at Vicarage Road. Watford won the match 3–0, with Taylor's commanding display helping towards their first win whilst keeping a clean sheet for over two months. He scored his first goal for Watford in a 2–0 win over Bristol City the following week.

After USA defender Jay DeMerit left the club, Taylor and Adrian Mariappa were manager Malky Mackay's preferred central defensive partnership for the 2010–11 season. Despite struggling with injury towards the end of the season, Taylor was able to start all 46 of Watford's league games. He also played a further three games in other competitions and scored six league goals. Taylor was noted for his consistency during the season, and finished second in the voting for Watford F.C. Player of the Season behind Championship top-scorer Danny Graham.

Taylor scored his first goal of the 2011–12 season on 28 August, in a 2–2 draw against former club Birmingham City. A dislocated collarbone suffered in October after a collision during Watford's home game against Crystal Palace kept him out for three months, and his return was further delayed when he broke his toe in a friendly in January 2012. He finally returned to league action at West Ham United in early March, as substitute for the concussed Dale Bennett, and was made captain for his first start since the injury, away to Bristol City two weeks later. At the end of the season, Taylor signed a new one-year contract with Watford.

=== Sheffield Wednesday ===
On 31 August 2012, Taylor signed a two-year deal to take him to newly promoted Championship side Sheffield Wednesday for an undisclosed fee. He made only thirteen appearances for Wednesday in his first season, the last of which came in mid-February 2013 against former club Birmingham City.

Taylor did not feature for the first month of Wednesday's 2013–14 season, and signed for League One side Brentford on 10 September on loan for a month. He made his debut on 14 September at Tranmere Rovers and scored within the first two minutes, beating the club record for fastest goal on league debut; Brentford won 4–3. He scored again on his third appearance, netting the second goal in a 2–0 victory over Coventry City on 29 September. His loan deal was renewed for a second month, during which he lost his place, and returned to Wednesday having played five league games and once in the Football League Trophy. He was released at the end of the season without making any further first-team appearances, and subsequently retired from professional football.

== Personal life ==
Taylor's son Caleb Taylor became a professional footballer with Millwall, also as a centre back.

== Career statistics ==
Club statistics
| Club | Season | League | | | FA Cup | | League Cup | | Other | | Total | |
| Club | Season | Division | Apps | Goals | Apps | Goals | Apps | Goals | Apps | Goals | Apps | Goals |
|---|---|---|---|---|---|---|---|---|---|---|---|---|
| Blackburn Rovers | 1998–99 | Premier League | 3 | 0 | 0 | 0 | 0 | 0 | 0 | 0 | 3 | 0 |
| Blackburn Rovers | 1999–2000 | Division One | 6 | 0 | 1 | 0 | 2 | 0 | — | | 9 | 0 |
| Blackburn Rovers | 2000–01 | Division One | 16 | 3 | 6 | 1 | 5 | 0 | — | | 27 | 4 |
| Blackburn Rovers | 2001–02 | Premier League | 19 | 0 | 4 | 0 | 6 | 0 | — | | 29 | 0 |
| Blackburn Rovers | 2002–03 | Premier League | 33 | 2 | 3 | 0 | 3 | 0 | 3 (Note: Appearance(s) in UEFA Cup) | 0 | 42 | 2 |
| Blackburn Rovers | 2003–04 | Premier League | 11 | 0 | 1 | 0 | 1 | 0 | 1 | 0 | 14 | 0 |
| Total | | | 88 | 5 | 15 | 1 | 17 | 0 | 4 | 0 | 124 | 6 |
| Darlington (loan) | 1999–2000 | Division Three | 4 | 0 | — | | — | | — | | 4 | 0 |
| Stockport County (loan) | 1999–2000 | Division One | 7 | 0 | — | | — | | — | | 7 | 0 |
| Birmingham City | 2003–04 | Premier League | 12 | 1 | — | | — | | — | | 12 | 1 |
| Birmingham City | 2004–05 | Premier League | 7 | 0 | 1 | 0 | 1 | 0 | — | | 9 | 0 |
| Birmingham City | 2005–06 | Premier League | 21 | 0 | 3 | 0 | 4 | 0 | — | | 28 | 0 |
| Birmingham City | 2006–07 | Championship | 31 | 0 | 3 | 1 | 4 | 0 | — | | 38 | 1 |
| Birmingham City | 2007–08 | Premier League | 4 | 0 | 0 | 0 | 1 | 0 | — | | 5 | 0 |
| Birmingham City | 2008–09 | Championship | 24 | 1 | 0 | 0 | 1 | 0 | — | | 25 | 1 |
| Birmingham City | 2009–10 | Premier League | 0 | 0 | 0 | 0 | 0 | 0 | — | | 0 | 0 |
| Total | | | 99 | 2 | 7 | 1 | 11 | 0 | — | | 117 | 3 |
| Norwich City (loan) | 2007–08 | Championship | 8 | 1 | — | | — | | — | | 8 | 1 |
| Watford | 2009–10 | Championship | 19 | 2 | — | | — | | — | | 19 | 2 |
| Watford | 2010–11 | Championship | 46 | 6 | 2 | 0 | 1 | 0 | — | | 49 | 6 |
| Watford | 2011–12 | Championship | 22 | 1 | 0 | 0 | 0 | 0 | — | | 22 | 1 |
| Watford | 2012–13 | Championship | 3 | 1 | — | | 2 | 0 | — | | 5 | 1 |
| Total | | | 90 | 10 | 2 | 0 | 3 | 0 | — | | 95 | 10 |
| Sheffield Wednesday | 2012–13 | Championship | 11 | 0 | 2 | 0 | — | | — | | 13 | 0 |
| Sheffield Wednesday | 2013–14 | Championship | 0 | 0 | 0 | 0 | 0 | 0 | — | | 0 | 0 |
| Total | | | 11 | 0 | 2 | 0 | 0 | 0 | — | | 13 | 0 |
| Brentford (loan) | 2013–14 | League One | 5 | 2 | — | | — | | 1 (Note: Appearance(s) in Football League Trophy) | 0 | 0 | 0 |
| Career total | | | 312 | 20 | 26 | 2 | 31 | 0 | 5 | 0 | 374 | 22 |

== Honours ==
Blackburn Rovers

- Football League Cup: 2001–02
