= 1999–2000 Blackburn Rovers F.C. season =

Blackburn Rovers
1999–2000 season
- Owner: Jack Walker
- Manager: Brian Kidd; Tony Parkes; Graeme Souness
- First Division: 11th
- FA Cup: Fifth round
- League Cup: Fourth round
- Top goalscorer: Lee Carsley (10)

Blackburn Rovers F.C. were in Division One for the 1999–2000 season, having been relegated from the FA Premier League after seven years. The expected comeback to the top flight did not materialise, in spite of several expensive purchases staying at the club. Brian Kidd was sacked on 3 November 1999 after 11 months in charge, with Rovers 19th in the league despite more than £30 million having been spent on players in that time. Long-serving coach Tony Parkes was placed in temporary charge of the team as the search for a successor began. Former defender Colin Hendry, who had been part of the title winning team in 1995 and who had started his first spell at Ewood Park in the 1980s, was linked with a return to the club as player-manager. Other names linked with the vacancy included Graeme Souness, Colin Todd, Roy Evans and Joe Kinnear.

The appointment of Graeme Souness on 15 March 2000 gave renewed hopes of a resurgence in 2000–01. Blackburn finished 11th in the final table.

== Squad ==
Squad at end of season

Note: Flags indicate national team as defined under FIFA eligibility rules; some limited exceptions apply. Players may hold more than one non-FIFA nationality.

No.	Pos.	Nation	Player
1	GK	AUS	John Filan
2	DF	IRL	Jeff Kenna
3	DF	SCO	Callum Davidson
4	MF	IRL	Jason McAteer
5	DF	ENG	Darren Peacock
6	MF	IRL	Lee Carsley
7	MF	ENG	Garry Flitcroft
9	FW	ENG	Ashley Ward
10	FW	NOR	Egil Ostenstad
12	MF	IRL	Damien Duff
13	GK	IRL	Alan Kelly
14	FW	WAL	Nathan Blake
15	FW	ENG	Matt Jansen
16	DF	ENG	Marlon Broomes
17	MF	SCO	Billy McKinlay
18	MF	NIR	Keith Gillespie
19	MF	NIR	Damien Johnson

No.	Pos.	Nation	Player
20	MF	DEN	Per Frandsen
21	MF	ENG	Jimmy Corbett
22	FW	ENG	Ben Burgess
23	DF	SCO	Christian Dailly
24	DF	SCO	David McNamee
25	MF	SCO	Burton O'Brien
26	FW	WAL	James Thomas
27	MF	ENG	David Dunn
28	DF	ENG	Martin Taylor
29	DF	ENG	Craig Short
30	GK	WAL	Anthony Williams
31	DF	ENG	Simon Grayson
32	DF	IRL	Peter Murphy
33	DF	ENG	Steve Harkness
35	GK	ENG	Alan Miller
36	DF	ENG	Leam Richardson
37	FW	NIR	Gary Hamilton

=== Left club during season ===
Note: Flags indicate national team as defined under FIFA eligibility rules; some limited exceptions apply. Players may hold more than one non-FIFA nationality.

No.	Pos.	Nation	Player
—	FW	ENG	Chris Sutton (to Chelsea)
—	GK	ENG	Tim Flowers (to Leicester City)
8	FW	SCO	Kevin Gallacher (to Newcastle United)
10	FW	ENG	Kevin Davies (to Southampton)
11	MF	ENG	Jason Wilcox (to Leeds United)

No.	Pos.	Nation	Player
20	MF	ENG	Gary Croft (to Ipswich Town)
22	GK	NIR	Alan Fettis (to York City)
34	MF	ENG	Wayne Gill (to Blackpool)
35	DF	ENG	Keith Brown (to Barnsley)

== Final league table ==
Pos	Team	Pld	W	D	L	GF	GA	GD	Pts	Qualification or relegation
1	Charlton Athletic (C, P)	46	27	10	9	79	45	+34	91	Promotion to the Premier League
2	Manchester City (P)	46	26	11	9	78	40	+38	89	Promotion to the Premier League
3	Ipswich Town (O, P)	46	25	12	9	71	42	+29	87	Qualification for the First Division play-offs
4	Barnsley	46	24	10	12	88	67	+21	82	Qualification for the First Division play-offs
5	Birmingham City	46	22	11	13	65	44	+21	77	Qualification for the First Division play-offs
6	Bolton Wanderers	46	21	13	12	69	50	+19	76	Qualification for the First Division play-offs
7	Wolverhampton Wanderers	46	21	11	14	64	48	+16	74	
8	Huddersfield Town	46	21	11	14	62	49	+13	74	
9	Fulham	46	17	16	13	49	41	+8	67	
10	Queens Park Rangers	46	16	18	12	62	53	+9	66	
11	Blackburn Rovers	46	15	17	14	55	51	+4	62	
12	Norwich City	46	14	15	17	45	50	−5	57	
13	Tranmere Rovers	46	15	12	19	57	68	−11	57	
14	Nottingham Forest	46	14	14	18	53	55	−2	56	
15	Crystal Palace	46	13	15	18	57	67	−10	54	
16	Sheffield United	46	13	15	18	59	71	−12	54	
17	Stockport County	46	13	15	18	55	67	−12	54	
18	Portsmouth	46	13	12	21	55	66	−11	51	
19	Crewe Alexandra	46	14	9	23	46	67	−21	51	
20	Grimsby Town	46	13	12	21	41	67	−26	51	
21	West Bromwich Albion	46	10	19	17	43	60	−17	49	
22	Walsall (R)	46	11	13	22	52	77	−25	46	Relegation to the Second Division
23	Port Vale (R)	46	7	15	24	48	69	−21	36	Relegation to the Second Division
24	Swindon Town (R)	46	8	12	26	38	77	−39	36	Relegation to the Second Division

Rules for classification: 1) Points; 2) Goal difference; 3) Goals scored
(C) Champions; (O) Play-off winners; (P) Promoted; (R) Relegated

== Results ==
=== Pre-season ===
15 July 1999 Friendly	IFK Göteborg	vs	Blackburn Rovers

19 July 1999 Friendly	Lillestrøm SK	vs	Blackburn Rovers

21 July 1999 Friendly	Fredrikstad	vs	Blackburn Rovers

24 July 1999 Friendly	Blackpool	vs	Blackburn Rovers

27 July 1999 Friendly	Oldham Athletic	vs	Blackburn Rovers

31 July 1999 Friendly	Blackburn Rovers	2–2	Liverpool	Ewood Park, Blackburn

=== Division One ===
7 August 1999 Round 1	Blackburn Rovers	0–0	Port Vale	Ewood Park, Blackburn

13 August 1999 Round 2	Huddersfield Town	3–2	Blackburn Rovers	Huddersfield
	Simon Grayson 26' (o.g.); Marcus Stewart 51'; Rob Edwards 90'		Lee Carsley 65'; Marlon Broomes 89'

21 August 1999 Round 3	Blackburn Rovers	1–2	Barnsley	Ewood Park, Blackburn
	Lee Carsley 81' (pen.)		Ǵorǵi Hristov 65'; Neil Shipperley 85'

28 August 1999 Round 4	Norwich City	0–2	Blackburn Rovers	Carrow Road, Norwich
			Egil Østenstad 6'; Egil Østenstad 51'

11 September 1999 Round 5	Blackburn Rovers	2–0	Tranmere Rovers	Ewood Park, Blackburn
	Ashley Ward 82'; Nathan Blake 87'

18 September 1999 Round 6	West Bromwich Albion	2–2	Blackburn Rovers	West Bromwich
	Kevin Kilbane 20'; Kevin Kilbane 87'		Christian Dailly 57'; Matt Jansen 67'

25 September 1999 Round 7	Blackburn Rovers	2–0	Walsall	Ewood Park, Blackburn
	Ashley Ward 34'; Lee Carsley 44'

28 September 1999 Round 8	Swindon Town	2–1	Blackburn Rovers	Swindon
	Mark Walters 30'; Bobby Howe 32'		Egil Østenstad 85'

2 October 1999 Round 9	Queens Park Rangers	0–0	Blackburn Rovers	London

16 October 1999 Round 10	Blackburn Rovers	1–1	Grimsby Town	Ewood Park, Blackburn
	Lee Carsley 45' (pen.)		Lee Ashcroft 43' (pen.)

20 October 1999 Round 11	Blackburn Rovers	1–1	Crystal Palace	Ewood Park, Blackburn
	Per Frandsen 86'		Hayden Mullins 55'

23 October 1999 Round 12	Manchester City	2–0	Blackburn Rovers	Manchester
	Richard Edghill 39'; Jeff Whitley 82'

26 October 1999 Round 13	Walsall	1–1	Blackburn Rovers	Walsall
	Michael Ricketts 85'		Lee Carsley 28' (pen.)

30 October 1999 Round 14	Blackburn Rovers	0–2	Queens Park Rangers	Ewood Park, Blackburn
			Stuart Wardley 40'; Kevin Gallen 89'

6 November 1999 Round 15	Blackburn Rovers	2–2	Ipswich Town	Ewood Park, Blackburn
	Lee Carsley 1'; Lee Carsley 67' (pen.)		Matthew Holland 75'; Tony Mowbray 90'

20 November 1999 Round 16	Blackburn Rovers	2–0	Fulham	Ewood Park, Blackburn
	Egil Østenstad 11'; Damien Duff 90'

23 November 1999 Round 17	Crewe Alexandra	0–0	Blackburn Rovers	Crewe

27 November 1999 Round 18	Blackburn Rovers	2–0	Stockport County	Ewood Park, Blackburn
	Per Frandsen 44'; Egil Østenstad 68'

30 November 1999 Round 19	Charlton Athletic	1–2	Blackburn Rovers	London
	Shaun Newton 45'		Ashley Ward 11'; Ashley Ward 48'

4 December 1999 Round 20	Port Vale	0–0	Blackburn Rovers	Stoke

7 December 1999 Round 21	Blackburn Rovers	3–1	Bolton Wanderers	Ewood Park, Blackburn
	Ashley Ward 56'; Jason McAteer 59'; Nathan Blake 80'		Robbie Elliott 57'

19 December 1999 Round 22	Sheffield United	2–1	Blackburn Rovers	Sheffield
	Marcus Bent 29'; Marcus Bent 71'		Ashley Ward 10'

26 December 1999 Round 23	Blackburn Rovers	2–1	Nottingham Forest	Ewood Park, Blackburn
	Per Frandsen 18'; Lee Carsley 68' (pen.)		Andy Johnson 31'

28 December 1999 Round 24	Portsmouth	1–2	Blackburn Rovers	Portsmouth
	Steve Claridge 14'		Christian Dailly 33'; Egil Østenstad 44'

3 January 2000 Round 25	Blackburn Rovers	1–1	Wolverhampton Wanderers	Ewood Park, Blackburn
	Egil Østenstad 39'		Lee Naylor 36'

15 January 2000 Round 26	Blackburn Rovers	2–0	Huddersfield Town	Ewood Park, Blackburn
	Damien Duff 29'; Damien Johnson 44'

22 January 2000 Round 27	Barnsley	5–1	Blackburn Rovers	Barnsley
	Bruce Dyer 5'; Craig Hignett 15'; Neil Shipperley 22'; Darren Barnard 32'; Bruce Dyer 72'		Per Frandsen 7'

5 February 2000 Round 28	Bolton Wanderers	3–1	Blackburn Rovers	Bolton
	Guðni Bergsson 17'; Michael Johansen 39'; Eiður Guðjohnsen 69'		Nathan Blake 16'

12 February 2000 Round 29	Blackburn Rovers	0–0	Swindon Town	Ewood Park, Blackburn

15 February 2000 Round 30	Birmingham City	1–0	Blackburn Rovers	Birmingham
	Martin O'Connor 33'

19 February 2000 Round 31	Stockport	0–1	Blackburn Rovers	Stockport
			Jason McAteer 79'

26 February 2000 Round 32	Blackburn Rovers	2–1	West Bromwich Albion	Ewood Park, Blackburn
	Keith Gillespie 70'; Christian Dailly 76'		Matt Carbon 14'

29 February 2000 Round 33	Blackburn Rovers	1–1	Norwich City	Ewood Park, Blackburn
	Per Frandsen 90'		Daryl Sutch 25'

4 March 2000 Round 34	Tranmere Rovers	2–1	Blackburn Rovers	Birkenhead
	Alan Mahon 47' (pen.); Wayne Allison 90'		Christian Dailly 90'

7 March 2000 Round 35	Ipswich Town	0–0	Blackburn Rovers	Ipswich

12 March 2000 Round 36	Blackburn Rovers	0–1	Crewe Alexandra	Ewood Park, Blackburn
			Colin Cramb 80'

18 March 2000 Round 37	Fulham	2–2	Blackburn Rovers	London
	Barry Hayles 18'; Karl-Heinz Riedle 75'		David Dunn 38'; Keith Gillespie 85'

22 March 2000 Round 38	Blackburn Rovers	1–0	Birmingham City	Ewood Park, Blackburn
	David Dunn 90'

25 March 2000 Round 39	Nottingham Forest	0–1	Blackburn Rovers	Nottingham
			Ashley Ward 7'

1 April 2000 Round 40	Blackburn Rovers	5–0	Sheffield United	Ewood Park, Blackburn
	Damien Duff 4'; Ashley Ward 42'; Egil Østenstad 67'; Damien Duff 82'; Matt Jansen 89'

8 April 2000 Round 41	Wolverhampton Wanderers	2–1	Blackburn Rovers	Wolverhampton
	Kevin Muscat 40' (pen.); Allan Nielsen 72'		Damien Duff 54'

15 April 2000 Round 42	Blackburn Rovers	1–1	Portsmouth	Ewood Park, Blackburn
	Lee Carsley 22' (pen.)		Ceri Hughes 41'

22 April 2000 Round 43	Grimsby Town	0–0	Blackburn Rovers	Grimsby

24 April 2000 Round 44	Blackburn Rovers	1–1	Charlton Athletic	Ewood Park, Blackburn
	Lee Carsley 63' (pen.)		Mathias Svensson 23'

29 April 2000 Round 45	Crystal Palace	2–1	Blackburn Rovers	London
	Ashley Cole 60'; Clinton Morrison 72'		Matt Jansen 27'

7 May 2000 Round 46	Blackburn Rovers	1–4	Manchester City	Ewood Park, Blackburn
	Matt Jansen 42'		Shaun Goater 60'; Christian Dailly 67' (o.g.); Mark Kennedy 75'; Paul Dickov 81'

=== League Cup ===
14 September 1999 Round 2, Leg 1	Portsmouth	0–3	Blackburn Rovers	Portsmouth
			Cundy 58' (o.g.); Jansen 72', 78'

22 September 1999 Round 2, Leg 2	Blackburn Rovers	3–1	Portsmouth	Ewood Park, Blackburn
	Duff 59'; Dunn 64'; Gallacher 90'		McLoughlin 7'

13 October 1999 Round 3	Leeds United	1–0	Blackburn Rovers	Leeds
	Mills 90'

=== FA Cup ===
11 December 1999 Round 3	West Bromwich Albion	2–2	Blackburn Rovers	West Bromwich
	Hughes 66'; Evans 80'		Frandsen 65'; Blake 70'

22 December 1999 Round 3 replay	Blackburn Rovers	2–0 (a.e.t.)	West Bromwich Albion	Ewood Park, Blackburn
	Duff 94'; Carsley 114' (pen.)

10 January 2000 Round 4	Liverpool	0–1	Blackburn Rovers	Liverpool
			Blake 84'

31 January 2000 Round 5	Blackburn Rovers	1–2	Newcastle United	Ewood Park, Blackburn
	Jansen 25'		Shearer 21', 79'

== Topscorers ==
=== League ===
- (Republic of Ireland) Lee Carsley 10
- (Norway) Egil Østenstad 8
- (England) Ashley Ward 8
- (Republic of Ireland) Damien Duff 5
- (England) Matt Jansen 4
