= Corrado Grabbi =

Italian footballer (born 1975)

Personal information
- Full name: Corrado Grabbi
- Date of birth: 29 July 1975 (age 51)
- Place of birth: Turin, Italy
- Height: 1.78 m (5 ft 10 in)
- Position: Striker

Team information
- Current team: Juventus (Under-15 youth coach)

Senior career*
Years	Team	Apps	(Gls)
1993–1994	Sparta Novara	31	(8)
1994–1995	Juventus	2	(1)
1995	Lucchese	8	(1)
1995–1996	Chievo	18	(2)
1996–1998	Modena	58	(30)
1998–1999	Ternana	14	(2)
1999–2000	Ravenna	29	(13)
2000–2001	Ternana	34	(20)
2001–2004	Blackburn Rovers	30	(2)
2002	→ Messina (loan)	12	(4)
2004	Ancona	7	(0)
2005–2006	Genoa	25	(8)
2006–2007	Arezzo	7	(0)
2007–2008	Bellinzona	6	(0)
Total		281	(91)
- * Club domestic league appearances and goals as of 14 May 2008

Corrado Grabbi (born 29 July 1975) is an Italian former professional footballer who played as a forward. He was nicknamed "Ciccio" throughout his career.

He is currently under contract with Juventus as a Under-15 youth coach.

== Playing career ==
=== Early career ===
Born in Turin, Grabbi began his career with the Juventus youth team. He is also the grandson of former Juventus player Giuseppe Grabbi. He was later promoted to the first team and scored on his debut against Lazio, in one of his total two appearances in the 1994–95 season.

Unable to break into the team, because of his young age and the contemporary explosion of Alessandro Del Piero, Grabbi was loaned to Lucchese (76 games, 8 goals) and then Chievo (18 games, 2 goals) before switching to Modena. There he found some real form, scoring 30 times in 58 appearances. This performance saw him signed by Ternana, where he played for one season before been loaned to Ravenna where he scored 13 goals. When he returned to Ternana he became a regular scorer again, with 20 goals in 34 games and became an idol for the local supporters, who still remember him as the best player to ever have played for Ternana.

=== Blackburn Rovers ===
Grabbi's prolific season with Ternana saw him attract the attention of various Serie A clubs, including Udinese and AC Milan. But apparently Luciano Moggi of Juventus, who had previously pressured Grabbi to change his agent and join GEA World with no success, made it impossible for Ciccio to play in Italy, so in 2001 he was signed by Blackburn Rovers for a record fee of £6.75 million in July 2001, but due to injuries and personal reasons, he failed to repeat this progress, scoring just once in fourteen league games, his goal coming in a 1–0 win over Everton. He scored once more before going on loan to Messina, in the FA Cup against Barnsley. Leaving the club on loan meant he missed out on their victory in the 2002 League Cup Final.

During a loan spell back in Italy with Messina, he scored two goals in the final game of the season and saved Messina from relegation. Upon his return to England, he failed to reignite his form, and after a further 16 games and three goals (against Liverpool in the league, CSKA Sofia in the UEFA Cup and Walsall in the League Cup) with Blackburn, who had in the meantime signed ex-Manchester United strikers Dwight Yorke and Andy Cole, he was allowed to return to Italy permanently with Ancona in 2004.

=== Later career ===
After spending one year without a team, trying to recover from the injury caused by a rare form of foot disease (Leveraus Morb) which had afflicted him for the past three seasons, he joined Genoa of Serie C1/A in September 2005. With his new team, he gained promotion to Serie B on playoffs scoring 9 goals in 25 games. Club president Enrico Preziosi decided then that Genoa did not need Grabbi anymore, so during the 2007 winter transfer window, Grabbi signed for Arezzo, still in Serie B, after having never made a single appearance in the first half of the season for Genoa. After relegation with Arezzo, scoring no goals, Grabbi signed a contract with AC Bellinzona, a team from the Swiss Challenge League (second division). Grabbi scored the winning goal (his first after more than one year) in the Swiss Cup game Bellinzona-Gossau: 2–1.

== Coaching career ==
After retirement, Grabbi took on a coaching career, joining his former playing team Juventus as a youth coach in 2009. Among all the players he trained as a youth coach from his early years in the Pulcini category, Grabbi also worked with Italian international Moise Kean.

== Honours ==
=== Club ===
Juventus

- Serie A: 1994–95
- Coppa Italia: 1994–95

Blackburn Rovers

- League Cup: 2001–02

== Websites ==
- http://www.acbellinzona.ch
- https://corradograbbi.blogspot.com/
