= Giuseppe Grabbi =

Italian footballer

Personal information
- Date of birth: 12 February 1901
- Place of birth: Turin, Kingdom of Italy
- Date of death: 25 August 1970 (aged 69)
- Place of death: Turin, Italy
- Position: Midfielder

Senior career*
Years	Team	Apps	(Gls)
1919–1921	Pastore		
1921–1927	Juventus	86	(14)
1927–1928	Novara	18	(2)
1928–1930	La Dominante	57	(1)
1930–1931	Liguria	28	(3)
1931–1932	Saluzzo		

International career
1924	Italy	1	(0)
- * Club domestic league appearances and goals

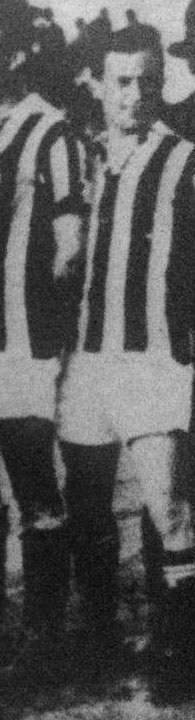
Italian footballer Giuseppe Grabbi at FBC Juventus in the 1920-21 season.

Giuseppe Grabbi (Italian pronunciation: [dʒuˈzɛppe ˈɡrabbi]; 12 February 1901 – 25 August 1970) was an Italian professional football player who played as a midfielder.

He is also the grandfather of former Juventus player Corrado Grabbi.

== Honours ==
Juventus

- Italian Football Championship: 1925–26
