= Damien Johnson =

Northern Irish footballer

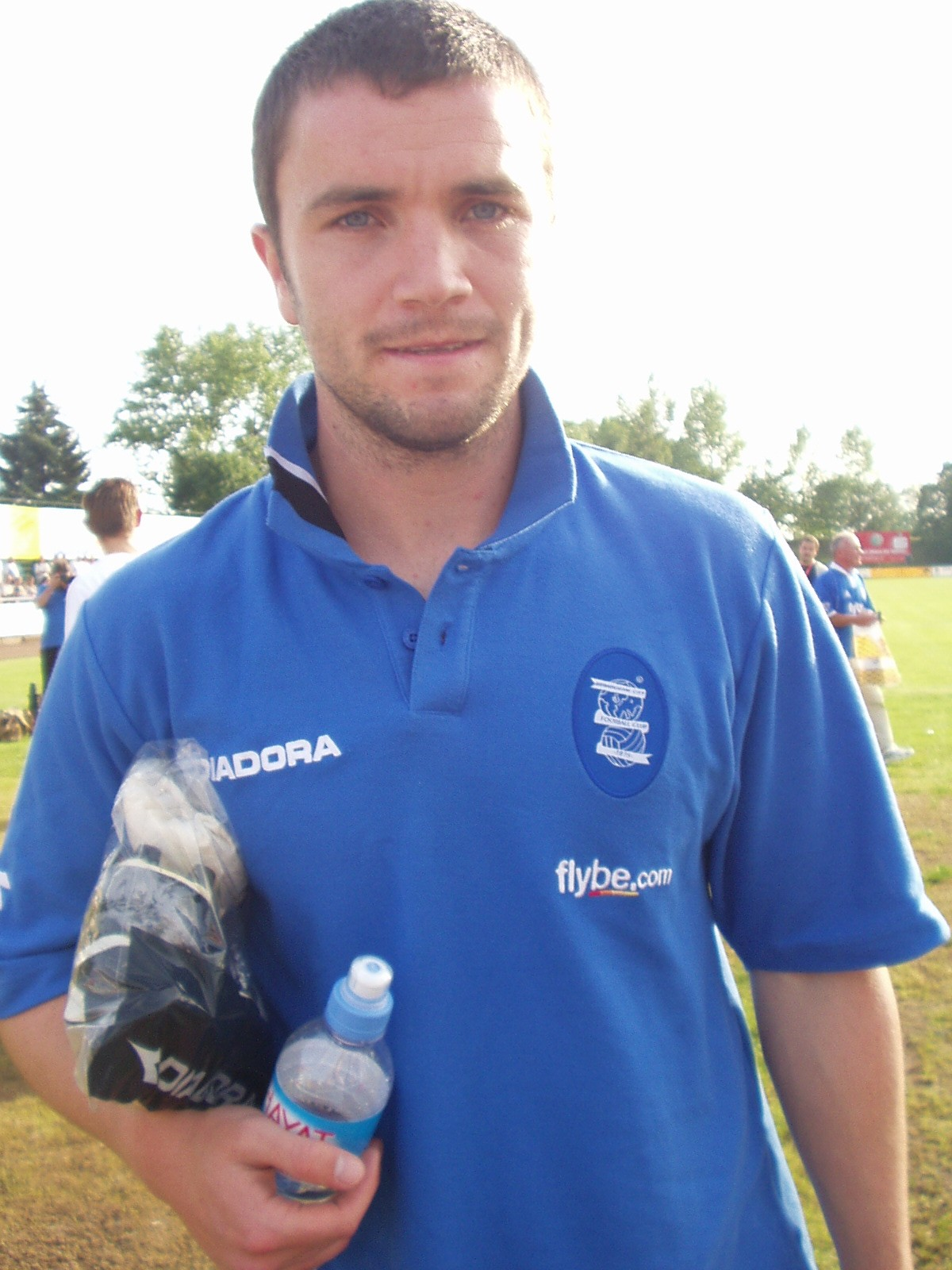
- Johnson in 2004 pre-season

Personal information
- Full name: Damien Michael Johnson
- Date of birth: 18 November 1978 (age 47)
- Place of birth: Lisburn, Northern Ireland
- Height: 5 ft 9 in (1.75 m)
- Position: Midfielder

Team information
- Current team: Blackburn Rovers (Assistant Head Coach & Head of Player Development)

Senior career*
Years	Team	Apps	(Gls)
1994–1995	Portadown	3	(0)
1997–2002	Blackburn Rovers (Note: Soccerbase omits appearances for both Blackburn Rovers and Birmingham City.)	60	(3)
1998	→ Nottingham Forest (loan)	6	(0)
2002–2010	Birmingham City	193	(4)
2010–2012	Plymouth Argyle	20	(2)
2010–2011	→ Huddersfield Town (loan)	16	(0)
2011–2012	→ Huddersfield Town (loan)	18	(0)
2012–2013	Fleetwood Town	22	(0)
Total		338	(9)

International career
1998–1999	Northern Ireland U16	2	(0)
1998–1999	Northern Ireland U17	1	(1)
1998–1999	Northern Ireland U18	2	(0)
1998–1999	Northern Ireland U21	11	(0)
1999–2010	Northern Ireland	56	(0)

Managerial career
- 2026: Blackburn Rovers (caretaker)
- * Club domestic league appearances and goals

Damien Michael Johnson (born 18 November 1978) is a Northern Irish football coach and former international player. Since 2019, he has been first team technical coach & head of player development at Blackburn Rovers.

He began his career with Portadown in his native Northern Ireland from whom he signed as a trainee for Blackburn Rovers and spent seven years with the club, as well as spending time on loan with Nottingham Forest. He moved to Birmingham City in 2002, where he spent the next eight seasons and became the club's captain. Johnson was transferred to Plymouth Argyle in 2010, spent the 2010–11 and 2011–12 season on loan to Huddersfield Town, and finished his playing career with Fleetwood Town in 2012–13.

He played for his country at schoolboy and youth levels before representing the Northern Ireland senior team over an eleven-year period, earning 56 caps.

== Club career ==
=== Blackburn Rovers ===
His first English team was Blackburn Rovers, for whom Johnson signed as a trainee, from Portadown in 1997, making his debut in the League Cup on 30 September 1997, a 1–0 defeat to Preston North End, in which he picked up a yellow card.

Loaned to Nottingham Forest on 28 January 1998, Johnson played in five games, and, despite accruing a yellow card in his last February appearance, performed well for the team.

Blackburn won the 2002 League Cup final a few days before Johnson left the club. Despite not being part of the squad for the final Johnson had contributed to a few games earlier in the cup run, including scoring a goal against Manchester City.

=== Birmingham City ===
Having dropped down the pecking order at Blackburn and out of contract at the end of the season, Johnson signed for Championship club Birmingham City on 8 March 2002. The fee was officially undisclosed, but later reported on Birmingham's website as £50,000.

In September 2004, he signed a new three-year contract. He was voted Birmingham's Player of the Year for 2005–06.

Johnson was named the Birmingham City captain for the 2006–07 season but in one of his first games as captain, he angered fans when he first threw his captain's armband and then his shirt on the floor when he was substituted late on. On 28 October, his jaw was broken in two places after he was elbowed in the face by West Bromwich Albion defender Paul Robinson. Despite the injury, he played on for the remaining 10 minutes of the match. He signed a new three-and-a-half-year contract in December, to run until the end of the 2009–10 season.

At the opening of the 2007–08 season Johnson injured a hamstring in a pre-season friendly. Further injuries followed, and he did not make his first league appearance of the season until 15 December, replacing the suspended Mehdi Nafti.

In all Johnson made 216 appearances for Birmingham City, with 150 of those in the Premier League.

=== Plymouth Argyle ===
Johnson joined Championship club Plymouth Argyle on a free transfer on 1 February 2010, signing a two-and-a-half-year contract. Birmingham manager Alex McLeish described him as "always a terrier of a player [who] gave us fantastic commitment ... and played a significant part in us returning to the Premier League", and wished him all the best.

He scored his first goal for Argyle in his fourth appearance, on 16 February against Swansea City, and finished the season with two goals from 20 league matches.

Plymouth released Johnson at the end of the 2011–12 season, having spent the last two seasons out on loan.

=== Huddersfield Town ===
==== 2010–11 season ====
On 5 August 2010, he joined Huddersfield Town on a season-long loan deal with a view to a permanent move. He made his Terriers debut two days later as a late substitute in the 3–0 win over Notts County at Meadow Lane. In December 2010, he suffered a cruciate ligament injury against Brighton which ruled him out for the remainder of the season. Johnson remained at the club until the end of the season to complete his rehabilitation and was nominated for the Player of the Year award. In all, he made 23 appearances.

==== 2011–12 season ====
The club confirmed on 18 July 2011 that he was set to sign on another season-long loan deal, which was confirmed the next day. His second debut for the Terriers came in the 3–0 win against Sheffield United at Brammall Lane on 13 September 2011.

=== Fleetwood Town ===
On 7 June 2012, Johnson joined newly promoted League Two club Fleetwood Town. Just over a year later, on 9 October 2013, Johnson left the club by mutual consent.

== International career ==
Johnson earned his first Northern Ireland call up on 29 May 1999, when he came on as a substitute in the 1–0 away win against the Republic of Ireland. Further appearances as substitute followed against Finland, Luxembourg, Malta, and Hungary, before he made his first full appearance versus Yugoslavia at Windsor Park, Belfast, in August 2000.

After a period when his international appearances were restricted by serious injury, Johnson made his 49th appearance for NI in the 3–0 World Cup Qualifying victory in San Marino on 11 February 2009, when he was the BBC's "Man of the Match".

On 29 July 2010, Johnson announced his retirement from international football after making 56 appearances for the team.

== Coaching career ==
Following his retirement from football, Johnson went into coaching, completing his coaching qualifications and gaining experience assisting at various clubs including Everton.

=== Blackburn Rovers ===
In April 2015, Johnson returned to Blackburn Rovers, the club at which he began his English career, as U14 academy coach. After three months he was appointed U21 lead coach, a post which was redesignated professional development phase lead coach when the development squad began to compete at under-23 level. In July 2019 he was promoted to first team technical coach & head of player development, a post he still held as of August 2024.

In July 2020, Northern Ireland manager Ian Baraclough added Johnson to his coaching team in addition to his duties at Blackburn, but Johnson gave up the role within a year for personal reasons. In February 2024, he and fellow coach David Lowe took temporary charge of Blackburn for their 3–1 Championship win over Stoke City while waiting for new manager John Eustace to take over formally. On 3 February 2026, Johnson was placed into temporary charge of the first team again following the departure of Valérien Ismaël.

== Career statistics ==
=== Club ===
Appearances and goals by club, season and competition
Club	Season	League			National Cup (Note: Includes Irish Cup, FA Cup)		League Cup (Note: Includes Irish League Cup, Football League Cup)		Other		Total	
Club	Season	Division	Apps	Goals	Apps	Goals	Apps	Goals	Apps	Goals	Apps	Goals
Portadown	1994–95	Irish League	3	0	1	0	1	0	3	1	8	1
Blackburn Rovers	1997–98	Premier League	0	0	0	0	1	0	—		1	0
Blackburn Rovers	1998–99	Premier League	21	1	0	0	3	0	1	0	25	1
Blackburn Rovers	1999–2000	First Division	16	1	4	0	3	0	—		23	1
Blackburn Rovers	2000–01	First Division	16	0	1	0	5	0	—		22	0
Blackburn Rovers	2001–02	Premier League	7	1	2	0	3	1	—		12	2
Blackburn Rovers	Total		60	3	7	0	15	1	1	0	83	4
Nottingham Forest (loan)	1997–98	First Division	6	0	—		—		—		6	0
Birmingham City	2001–02	First Division	8	1	—		—		1 (Note: Appearance in First Division play-offs)	0	9	1
Birmingham City	2002–03	Premier League	30	1	1	0	1	0	—		32	1
Birmingham City	2003–04	Premier League	35	1	4	0	1	0	—		40	1
Birmingham City	2004–05	Premier League	36	0	0	0	1	0	—		37	1
Birmingham City	2005–06	Premier League	31	0	4	0	3	0	—		38	0
Birmingham City	2006–07	Championship	26	1	3	0	0	0	—		29	0
Birmingham City	2007–08	Premier League	17	0	0	0	1	0	—		18	0
Birmingham City	2008–09	Championship	9	0	1	0	0	0	—		10	0
Birmingham City	2009–10	Premier League	1	0	2	0	0	0	—		3	0
Birmingham City	Total		193	4	15	0	7	0	1	0	216	4
Plymouth Argyle	2009–10	Championship	20	2	—		—		—		20	2
Huddersfield Town (loan)	2010–11	League One	16	0	3	0	2	0	2 (Note: Appearances in Football League Trophy)	0	23	0
Huddersfield Town (loan)	2011–12	League One	18	0	0	0	0	0	3 (Note: Appearances in League One play-offs)	0	21	0
Huddersfield Town (loan)	Total		34	0	3	0	2	0	5	0	44	0
Fleetwood Town	2012–13	League Two	22	0	1	0	0	0	0	0	23	0
Career total			338	9	27	0	25	1	9	1	398	11

=== International ===
Appearances and goals by national team and year
National team	Year	Apps	Goals
Northern Ireland	1999	2	0
Northern Ireland	2000	6	0
Northern Ireland	2001	5	0
Northern Ireland	2002	6	0
Northern Ireland	2003	7	0
Northern Ireland	2004	9	0
Northern Ireland	2005	7	0
Northern Ireland	2006	2	0
Northern Ireland	2007	2	0
Northern Ireland	2008	2	0
Northern Ireland	2009	8	0
Northern Ireland	Total	56	0

=== As a manager ===
As of match played 14 February 2026

Managerial record by team and tenure
Team	From	To	Record				
Team	From	To	P	W	D	L	Win %
Blackburn Rovers (interim)	2 February 2026	14 February 2026	3	2	0	1	66.67
Total			3	2	0	1	66.67

== Honours ==
Blackburn Rovers

- Football League Cup: 2001–02

Birmingham City

- Football League First Division play-offs: 2002
- Football League Championship runner-up: 2006–07, 2008–09

Huddersfield Town

- Football League One play-offs: 2012
