= 2004–05 Blackburn Rovers F.C. season =

Blackburn Rovers
2004–05 season
- Manager: Graeme Souness (until 6 September); Mark Hughes (from 16 September)
- Premier League: 15th
- FA Cup: Semi-finals
- League Cup: Second round
- Top goalscorer: League: Paul Dickov (9); All: Paul Dickov (10)
- Highest home attendance: 29,271 (vs. Newcastle United, 26 December)
- Lowest home attendance: 18,006 (vs. Crystal Palace, 20 April)
- Average home league attendance: 22,315
Home colours	Away colours

During the 2004–05 English football season, Blackburn Rovers competed in the FA Premier League.

== Season summary ==
The authoritative methods of manager Graeme Souness had caused Blackburn to struggle the previous season and alienated several key players, including the strike partnership of Andy Cole and Dwight Yorke, who left Blackburn during the summer for Fulham and Birmingham City respectively. Eventually Souness departed Blackburn to become manager at Newcastle United, with Blackburn struggling in the relegation zone. Wales manager and former Rovers player Mark Hughes came in as his replacement; Hughes' lack of experience in club management showed and the club were bottom of the Premiership after 14 games played, but he soon rallied the team to finish comfortably clear of relegation in 15th – as close to a relegation spot as they were to a UEFA Cup place, in terms of points. The club also enjoyed a good run in the FA Cup, reaching the semi-finals before losing to eventual cup winners Arsenal.

During the close season, Hughes signed striker Craig Bellamy, who had played for Hughes with Wales, from Newcastle, in the hope that the Tyneside club's out-of-favour striker could fire Rovers to a higher place next season.

== Final league table ==
Pos	Team	Pld	W	D	L	GF	GA	GD	Pts	Qualification or relegation
13	Fulham	38	12	8	18	52	60	−8	44	
14	Newcastle United	38	10	14	14	47	57	−10	44	Qualification for the Intertoto Cup third round
15	Blackburn Rovers	38	9	15	14	32	43	−11	42	
16	Portsmouth	38	10	9	19	43	59	−16	39	
17	West Bromwich Albion	38	6	16	16	36	61	−25	34	

Rules for classification: 1) points; 2) goal difference; 3) number of goals scored.

== Players ==
=== First-team squad ===
Squad at end of season

Note: Flags indicate national team as defined under FIFA eligibility rules; some limited exceptions apply. Players may hold more than one non-FIFA nationality.

No.	Pos.	Nation	Player
1	GK	USA	Brad Friedel
2	DF	AUS	Lucas Neill
4	DF	ITA	Lorenzo Amoruso
5	MF	ENG	Garry Flitcroft
6	DF	ENG	Craig Short
7	MF	AUS	Brett Emerton
8	MF	TUR	Tugay Kerimoğlu
9	FW	ENG	Jon Stead
10	FW	SCO	Paul Dickov
12	MF	NOR	Morten Gamst Pedersen
13	GK	FIN	Peter Enckelman
14	DF	SWE	Nils-Eric Johansson
15	MF	RSA	Aaron Mokoena
17	FW	ENG	Matt Jansen

No.	Pos.	Nation	Player
18	MF	IRL	Steven Reid (Note: Reid was born in Kingston upon Thames, England, and represented England at U-16 level, but also qualified to represent the Republic of Ireland internationally through his father and made his international debut for the Republic of Ireland in 2001.)
19	FW	SCO	Paul Gallagher
20	MF	ENG	David Thompson
21	MF	IRL	Jonathan Douglas
22	DF	SCO	Dominic Matteo
23	DF	SVK	Vratislav Greško
24	DF	ENG	Andy Todd
25	DF	ENG	Jay McEveley (Note: McEveley was born in Liverpool, England, but also qualified to represent Scotland internationally and made his international debut for Scotland in August 2007.)
27	FW	ENG	Jay Bothroyd (on loan from Perugia)
28	FW	USA	Jemal Johnson
29	DF	NZL	Ryan Nelsen
30	FW	ENG	Matt Derbyshire
31	MF	WAL	Robbie Savage
33	DF	ENG	Michael Gray

=== Left club during season ===
Note: Flags indicate national team as defined under FIFA eligibility rules; some limited exceptions apply. Players may hold more than one non-FIFA nationality.

No.	Pos.	Nation	Player
11	MF	ESP	Javier de Pedro (released)
15	FW	TRI	Dwight Yorke (to Birmingham City)
15	FW	FRA	Youri Djorkaeff (to NY/NJ Metrostars)
16	MF	SCO	Barry Ferguson (to Rangers)

No.	Pos.	Nation	Player
—	MF	ENG	Neil Danns (to Colchester United)
—	DF	ENG	Alex Bruce (to Birmingham City (Note: Bruce was born in Norwich, England, but also qualified to represent the Republic of Ireland and Northern Ireland internationally through his grandmother and made his international debut for the Republic of Ireland in May 2007 before changing his nationality to Northern Ireland in July 2011.))
—	MF	ENG	Ciaran Donnelly (to Blackpool)

== Reserve squad ==
Note: Flags indicate national team as defined under FIFA eligibility rules; some limited exceptions apply. Players may hold more than one non-FIFA nationality.

No.	Pos.	Nation	Player
26	GK	GER	David Yelldell (Note: Yelldell was born in Stuttgart, West Germany (now Germany), but also qualified to represent the United States internationally through his father and made his international debut for the United States in March 2011.)
32	DF	ENG	Andy Taylor

No.	Pos.	Nation	Player
—	DF	SCO	Craig Barr

== Statistics ==
=== Appearances and goals ===
No.	Pos	Nat	Player	Total		Premier League		FA Cup		League Cup	
No.	Pos	Nat	Player	Apps	Goals	Apps	Goals	Apps	Goals	Apps	Goals
Goalkeepers
1	GK	(United States) USA	Brad Friedel	45	0	38	0	7	0	0	0
13	GK	(Finland) FIN	Peter Enckelman	1	0	0	0	0	0	1	0
Defenders
2	DF	(Australia) AUS	Lucas Neill	44	1	34+2	1	7	0	1	0
4	DF	(Italy) ITA	Lorenzo Amoruso	7	0	5+1	0	0	0	1	0
6	DF	(England) ENG	Craig Short	14	1	13+1	1	0	0	0	0
14	DF	(Sweden) SWE	Nils-Eric Johansson	28	0	18+4	0	4+1	0	1	0
22	DF	(Scotland) SCO	Dominic Matteo	32	1	25+3	0	4	1	0	0
23	DF	(Slovakia) SVK	Vratislav Greško	4	0	2+1	0	0	0	1	0
24	DF	(England) ENG	Andy Todd	32	1	26	1	6	0	0	0
25	DF	(England) ENG	Jay McEveley	5	0	5	0	0	0	0	0
29	DF	(New Zealand) NZL	Ryan Nelsen	20	0	15	0	4+1	0	0	0
33	DF	(England) ENG	Michael Gray	9	0	9	0	0	0	0	0
Midfielders
5	MF	(England) ENG	Garry Flitcroft	23	0	17+2	0	3+1	0	0	0
7	MF	(Australia) AUS	Brett Emerton	44	5	33+4	4	4+2	0	1	1
8	MF	(Turkey) TUR	Tugay Kerimoğlu	26	1	13+8	0	4	1	1	0
12	MF	(Norway) NOR	Morten Gamst Pedersen	27	8	19	4	7	3	0+1	1
15	MF	(South Africa) RSA	Aaron Mokoena	22	0	16	0	5+1	0	0	0
18	MF	(Republic of Ireland) IRL	Steven Reid	34	2	23+5	2	2+4	0	0	0
20	MF	(England) ENG	David Thompson	30	2	11+13	0	5+1	2	0	0
21	MF	(Republic of Ireland) IRL	Jonathan Douglas	2	0	0+1	0	0	0	1	0
31	MF	(Wales) WAL	Robbie Savage	13	0	9	0	3+1	0	0	0
Forwards
9	FW	(England) ENG	Jon Stead	34	2	19+10	2	1+3	0	0+1	0
10	FW	(Scotland) SCO	Paul Dickov	35	10	27+2	9	6	1	0	0
17	FW	(England) ENG	Matt Jansen	8	2	3+4	2	0	0	1	0
19	FW	(Scotland) SCO	Paul Gallagher	21	3	5+11	2	3+1	0	0+1	1
22	FW	(United States) USA	Jemal Johnson	6	1	0+3	0	1+2	1	0	0
27	FW	(England) ENG	Jay Bothroyd	13	1	6+5	1	0+1	0	1	0
30	FW	(England) ENG	Matt Derbyshire	1	0	0+1	0	0	0	0	0
Players transferred out during the season
11	MF	(Spain) ESP	Javier de Pedro	3	0	1+1	0	0	0	1	0
15	FW	(Trinidad and Tobago) TRI	Dwight Yorke	4	0	2+2	0	0	0	0	0
15	FW	(France) FRA	Youri Djorkaeff	3	0	3	0	0	0	0	0
16	MF	(Scotland) SCO	Barry Ferguson	22	2	21	2	1	0	0	0

Last updated: 31 May 2005
Source: Competitions

== Results ==
=== Premier League ===
==== Results by matchday ====
Matchday	1	2	3	4	5	6	7	8	9	10	11	12	13	14	15	16	17	18	19	20	21	22	23	24	25	26	27	28	29	30	31	32	33	34	35	36	37	38
Ground	H	A	A	H	A	H	A	H	H	A	H	A	A	H	A	H	A	H	H	A	A	H	A	H	A	A	H	A	A	H	A	H	A	H	H	A	H	A
Result	D	L	L	D	L	W	L	D	L	L	D	D	D	D	W	L	D	D	D	W	L	W	W	L	L	L	W	D	W	L	D	W	D	D	D	L	L	D
Position	8	13	19	19	19	16	16	17	18	20	20	20	19	20	17	17	18	16	16	15	16	16	16	16	16	16	16	15	14	14	14	14	14	13	13	14	14	15

Source: worldfootball.net
A = Away; H = Home; W = Win; D = Draw; L = Loss

14 August 2004 1	Blackburn Rovers	1–1	West Bromwich Albion
	Craig Short 70'	Report	Neil Clement 33'	Attendance: 23,500 (4,000 away)

21 August 2004 2	Southampton	3–2	Blackburn Rovers
	Kevin Phillips 32'; Anders Svensson 74'; James Beattie 90'		Barry Ferguson 50'; Paul Dickov 68'

25 August 2004 3	Arsenal	3–0	Blackburn Rovers	Highbury, London
	Henry 50'; Fàbregas 58'; Reyes 79'	Report		Stadium: Highbury; Attendance: 37,496; Referee: Neale Barry

28 August 2004 4	Blackburn Rovers	1–1	Manchester United
	Paul Dickov 17'	Report	Alan Smith 90'

11 September 2004 5	Newcastle United	3–0	Blackburn Rovers	Newcastle upon Tyne, Tyne and Wear
	Flitcroft 9' (o.g.); Shearer 16'; O'Brien 83'	Report		Stadium: St James' Park; Attendance: 52,015; Referee: Dermot Gallagher

18 September 2004 6	Blackburn Rovers	1–0	Portsmouth
	Matt Jansen 75'			Attendance: (1,000 away)

27 September 2004 7	Charlton	1–0	Blackburn Rovers
	Talal El Karkouri 49'

2 October 2004 8	Blackburn Rovers	2–2	Aston Villa
	Barry Ferguson 30'; Brett Emerton 63'	Report	Juan Pablo Ángel 25'; Olof Mellberg 80'

16 October 2004 9	Blackburn Rovers	0–4	Middlesbrough
		Report	Jimmy Floyd Hasselbaink 46', 57', 90'; George Boateng 50'

23 October 2004 10	Chelsea	4–0	Blackburn Rovers
	Eiður Guðjohnsen 37', 38', 53' (pen.); Damien Duff 74'	Report

30 October 2004 11	Blackburn Rovers	2–2	Liverpool	Blackburn, Lancashire
	Bothroyd 16'; Emerton 45'	Report	Riise 7'; Baroš 54'	Stadium: Ewood Park; Attendance: 26,314; Referee: Rob Styles

6 November 2004 12	Norwich City	1–1	Blackburn Rovers	Norwich, Norfolk
15:00 GMT	Svensson 56'	Report	Bothroyd (red card) 44'; Dickov 86'	Stadium: Carrow Road; Attendance: 23,834; Referee: Steve Dunn

13 November 2004 13	Manchester City	1–1	Blackburn Rovers
	Antoine Sibierski 45'		Paul Dickov 78' (pen.)

21 November 2004 14	Blackburn Rovers	3–3	Birmingham City	Blackburn, Lancashire
16:05 GMT (UTC)	Jansen 4'; Reid 57'; Gallagher 63'	Report	Anderton 17'; Savage 38'; Dunn 45'	Stadium: Ewood Park; Attendance: 20,290; Referee: Neale Barry

27 November 2004 15	Fulham	0–2	Blackburn Rovers
			Paul Gallagher 10'; Paul Dickov 77' (pen.)

4 December 2004 16	Blackburn Rovers	0–1	Tottenham
			Robbie Keane 56'

11 December 2004 17	Crystal Palace	0–0	Blackburn Rovers	Selhurst, London
		Report		Stadium: Selhurst Park; Attendance: 22,010; Referee: Alan Wiley

18 December 2004 18	Blackburn Rovers	0–0	Everton
		Report

26 December 2004 19	Blackburn Rovers	2–2	Newcastle United	Blackburn, Lancashire
	Dickov 26'; Todd 54'	Report	Dyer 6'; Robert 34'	Stadium: Ewood Park; Attendance: 29,271; Referee: Matt Messias

28 December 2004 20	Bolton Wanderers	0–1	Blackburn Rovers
		Report	Paul Dickov 6'

1 January 2005 21	Aston Villa	1–0	Blackburn Rovers
	Nolberto Solano 88'	Report

3 January 2005 22	Blackburn Rovers	1–0	Charlton
	Brett Emerton 41'

15 January 2005 23	Portsmouth	0–1	Blackburn Rovers
			Morten Gamst Pedersen 55'

24 January 2005 24	Blackburn Rovers	0–1	Bolton
		Report	El Hadji Diouf 77'

2 February 2005 25	Blackburn Rovers	0–1	Chelsea
		Report	Arjen Robben 5'

5 February 2005 26	Middlesbrough	1–0	Blackburn Rovers
	Franck Queudrue 35'

12 February 2005 27	Blackburn Rovers	3–0	Norwich City	Blackburn, Lancashire
15:00 GMT	Pedersen 17'; Dickov 39', 62'	Report		Stadium: Ewood Park; Attendance: 20,923; Referee: Steve Dunn

6 March 2005 29	Everton	0–1	Blackburn Rovers
			Jon Stead 71'

16 March 2005 28	Liverpool	0–0	Blackburn Rovers	Liverpool, Merseyside
		Report		Stadium: Anfield; Attendance: 37,765; Referee: Barry Knight

19 March 2005 30	Blackburn Rovers	0–1	Arsenal	Blackburn, Lancashire
		Report	van Persie 43'	Stadium: Ewood Park; Attendance: 22,992; Referee: Graham Poll

2 April 2005 31	Manchester United	0–0	Blackburn Rovers
		Report

9 April 2005 32	Blackburn Rovers	3–0	Southampton
	Morten Gamst Pedersen 11'; Andreas Jakobsson 48' (o.g.); Steven Reid 55'

20 April 2005 34	Blackburn Rovers	1–0	Crystal Palace	Blackburn, Lancashire
	Pedersen 45'	Report		Stadium: Ewood Park

23 April 2005 35	Blackburn Rovers	0–0	Manchester City

26 April 2005 33	West Bromwich	1–1	Blackburn Rovers
	Kieran Richardson 32'		Brett Emerton 64'

30 April 2005 36	Birmingham City	2–1	Blackburn Rovers	Birmingham, West Midlands
15:00 BST (UTC+01)	Blake 61'; Heskey 80'	Report	Stead 13'	Stadium: St Andrew's; Attendance: 28,621; Referee: Barry Knight

7 May 2005 37	Blackburn Rovers	1–3	Fulham
	Lucas Neill 6'		Steed Malbranque 20', 77'; Brian McBride 53'

15 May 2005 38	Tottenham Hotspur	0–0	Blackburn Rovers

=== League Cup ===
22 September 2004 Round 2	Blackburn Rovers	3–3 (a.e.t.) (6–7 p)	AFC Bournemouth	Blackburn
19:45	Emerton 8'; Pedersen 90'; Gallagher 91'		O'Connor 13'; Broadhurst 82'; Spicer 115'	Stadium: Ewood Park; Attendance: 7,226
	Penalties
	Amoruso (penalty scored); Neill (penalty scored); Pedersen (penalty scored); Stead (penalty missed); Gallagher (penalty scored); Douglas (penalty scored); Jansen (penalty scored); Tugay (penalty missed)		(penalty scored) Cummings; (penalty missed) Holmes; (penalty scored) O'Connor; (penalty scored) Connell; (penalty scored) Elliott; (penalty scored) Spicer; (penalty scored) Maher; (penalty scored) Howe

=== FA Cup ===
8 January 2005 Round 3	Cardiff City	1–1	Blackburn Rovers
15:00	Lee 35'		Morten Gamst Pedersen 5'	Attendance: 14,145

19 January 2005 Round 3 Replay	Blackburn Rovers	3–2	Cardiff City
20:00	Thompson 9', 32'; Pedersen 47'		McAnuff 24'; Collins 54'	Attendance: 9,140

29 January 2005 Round 4	Blackburn Rovers	3–0	Colchester United
15:00	Watson 21' (O.G.); Johnson 27'; Matteo 51'			Attendance: 10,634

20 February 2005 Round 5	Burnley	0–0	Blackburn Rovers
13:30				Attendance: 21,468 (4,033 away)

1 March 2005 Round 5 Replay	Blackburn Rovers	2–1	Burnley
20:00	Tugay 31'; Pedersen 86'		Hyde 42'	Attendance: 28,691 (7,000 away)

13 March 2005 Round 6	Blackburn Rovers	1–0	Leicester City
13:05	Dickov 83' (pen.)			Attendance: 22,113 (7,200 away)

16 April 2005 Semi; Final	Arsenal	3–0	Blackburn Rovers	Millennium Stadium
12:15	Pires 42'; Van Persie 86', 90'			Attendance: 52,077 (14,800 Blackburn)
