= St John Henry Newman Catholic School, Carlisle =

St John Henry Newman Catholic School

Location
- Scalegate Road; Carlisle, Cumbria, CA2 4NL; England
- 54.8689°N 2.9212°W

Information
- Type: Voluntary aided school
- Religious affiliation: Roman Catholic
- Local authority: Cumberland Council
- Department for Education URN: 112399 Tables
- Ofsted: Reports
- Headteacher: Declan McArdle
- Gender: Coeducational
- Age: 11 to 18
- Enrolment: 671 as of December 2021
- Website: http://newman.cumbria.sch.uk/

St John Henry Newman Catholic School is a coeducational Roman Catholic secondary school and sixth form. It is located in Carlisle in the English county of Cumbria.

It is a Voluntary aided school administered by Cumberland Council and the Roman Catholic Diocese of Lancaster. The school is named after Cardinal John Henry Newman.

St John Henry Newman Catholic School offers GCSEs and BTECs as programmes of study for pupils, while students in the sixth form have the option to study from a range of A-levels and further BTECs.

== Notable former pupils ==
- Matt Jansen, footballer
- Rumer, singer-songwriter
