= Keith Gillespie =

Northern Irish footballer (born 1975)

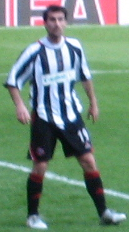
- Gillespie at Sheffield United in 2006

Personal information
- Full name: Keith Robert Gillespie
- Date of birth: 18 February 1975 (age 51)
- Place of birth: Larne, County Antrim, Northern Ireland
- Height: 5 ft 10 in (1.78 m)
- Position: Winger

Youth career
- Lisburn Youth
- St Andrews FC
- Manchester United

Senior career*
Years	Team	Apps	(Gls)
1993–1995	Manchester United	9	(1)
1993	→ Wigan Athletic (loan)	8	(4)
1995–1998	Newcastle United	113	(11)
1998–2003	Blackburn Rovers	115	(6)
2000–2001	→ Wigan Athletic (loan)	5	(0)
2003–2005	Leicester City	42	(2)
2005–2009	Sheffield United	97	(4)
2008	→ Charlton Athletic (loan)	6	(0)
2009	Bradford City	3	(0)
2009–2010	Glentoran	33	(2)
2010	Darlington	1	(0)
2011–2013	Longford Town	59	(1)
2020	FC Mindwell		
Total		491	(31)

International career
1994	Northern Ireland U21	1	(0)
1994–2008	Northern Ireland	86	(2)
- * Club domestic league appearances and goals

Keith Robert Gillespie (/ɡɪˈlɛspi/ ghih-LES-pee; born 18 February 1975) is a Northern Irish former professional footballer who played as a winger.

He began his career at Manchester United after winning the FA Youth Cup in 1992, before moving to Newcastle United, where he played in the UEFA Champions League. Gillespie also played in the Premier League for Blackburn Rovers, Leicester City and Sheffield United, helping Blackburn win the Football League Cup in 2002. Towards the end of his career, he played for Glentoran in the Irish League and Longford Town in the League of Ireland.

Gillespie earned 86 caps for Northern Ireland between 1994 and 2008, putting him 10th in their most capped players of all time. He had well-publicised issues with problem gambling during his career, and has since spoken out about gambling.

== Club career ==
=== Early career ===
Gillespie was born in Larne, County Antrim. His first years were spent in Islandmagee, County Antrim, where he attended Whitehead Primary School. He later moved to Bangor, County Down where he attended Rathmore Primary School and Bangor Grammar School. Gillespie played for Lisburn Youth in Drumbo. He was scouted playing for St Andrews FC from Belfast, playing in the DAWFL, and was the first professional footballer to come from this club.

=== Manchester United ===
Gillespie signed for Manchester United on leaving school in the summer of 1991, being a member of the FA Youth Cup winning side in 1992. Also in that team were Ryan Giggs, Paul Scholes, David Beckham, Gary Neville and Robbie Savage.

Gillespie made his first senior appearance for Manchester United in the 1992–93 season. He scored on his debut against Bury in a 2–0 FA Cup third round triumph on 5 January 1993. He was issued with the number 31 shirt for the 1993–94 season with the introduction of squad numbers, but did not play any first team games and was loaned to Division Three club Wigan Athletic, scoring four goals in eight games.

Occasional appearances for United followed in 1994–95, but he was never able to displace Andrei Kanchelskis as United's first-choice right winger.

Gillespie scored his only league goal for Manchester United against Newcastle United in a 2–0 victory at Old Trafford in October 1994. He subsequently signed for Newcastle on 10 January 1995, as a £1 million component in the £7 million deal (£6 million cash) which took Andy Cole to Old Trafford.

=== Newcastle United ===
On 20 August 1995, the News of the World carried reports that Gillespie was subject of an approach from Alex Ferguson to return to Manchester United to fill the gap on the right wing being left by the sale of Andrei Kanchelskis to Everton, but the return to Old Trafford never happened and up-and-coming youngster David Beckham would go on to occupy that position. 18 years later, Gillespie confirmed that Ferguson did contact him regarding a possible return, but claims that he heard nothing more about the prospective transfer after that original telephone conversation with his former manager.

Gillespie stayed at Newcastle for three and a half years and during this time he played 143 games, including 15 European ties (in both the Champions League and UEFA Cup) and scored 13 goals. In both the 1995–96 and 1996–97 seasons he helped Newcastle to finish second in the Premier League (runners up to Gillespie's former club, Manchester United, on both occasions), being a key member of "The Entertainers". On the first occasion, the Magpies very nearly beat Gillespie's old club to the title, having been 10 points ahead of them by Christmas 1995 before a dismal final three months of the season saw the title sealed by Gillespie's former teammates. Initially injured from a Phil Neville tackle in a 0–2 defeat at Old Trafford on 27 December 1995 causing him to miss the following three games, at the end of the 1995–96 season Gary Lineker, then a BBC pundit, said that one of the main reasons that Newcastle lost out on the title race was because they dropped Gillespie (who had been supplying Newcastle's forwards with a stream of good crosses) for several key games in the latter part of the season.

In September 1996, Gillespie was outed as a problem gambler by The Sun. He then accepted a £5,000 payment by the same tabloid to publicly thank them for helping out his problem. Gillespie has publicly said that he would bet on matches involving his own team, and once lost £52,000 because Newcastle scored a late goal in a game against Stoke City that he had bet on them beating by less than 4 goals.

In his final full season at Newcastle, the 1997–98 season, Gillespie assisted two of Faustino Asprilla's three goals in a 3–2 Champions League victory over FC Barcelona on 17 September 1997. He also scored what he later claimed was his best goal for the club when playing up front due to an injury crisis at home to Blackburn Rovers in 1-1 draw on 25 October 1997. He also helped Newcastle to reach the FA Cup final. However, a foot injury sustained in a 0–2 defeat at Tottenham Hotspur on 25 April 1998 meant he was not in the squad for the final and Newcastle lost to Arsenal. Despite being in manager Kenny Dalglish's plans, the following pre-season Gillespie failed a medical at Middlesbrough but eventually departed Tyneside in a £2.3 million move to Blackburn Rovers following the appointment of Ruud Gullit as manager and a final appearance in a 2–2 draw at Middlesbrough on 6 December 1998.

=== Blackburn Rovers ===
Gillespie was unable to help Blackburn avoid relegation in 1998–99, and manager Brian Kidd was sacked later in the year. Gillespie was initially out of favour with new manager Graeme Souness, and another loan spell at Wigan Athletic brought his total appearances for Athletic to 15, from which he scored four goals. He returned to the Blackburn side for the final months of the 2000–01 season, as the club gained promotion back to the Premier League. He also started in the 2002 Football League Cup Final, setting up a goal by Matt Jansen in the 2–1 victory over Tottenham Hotspur. Five seasons at Ewood Park brought 137 appearances and 6 goals.

=== Leicester City ===
Gillespie moved to newly promoted Leicester City on a free transfer on 8 July 2003, signing a two-year contract. He played 48 games and scored two goals in two seasons.

In March 2004, Gillespie and teammates Frank Sinclair and Paul Dickov were held in a prison cell for a week in La Manga, Spain, while charges were made against six more Leicester players. All nine men were cleared when forensic tests proved that none of them had any contact with the three women who accused them.

=== Sheffield United ===
Gillespie signed for Sheffield United on 5 August 2005, signing a one-year contract. This was then extended to June 2007 a month later. In his first season at the club, Gillespie played a role in Sheffield United's successful promotion campaign to the Premier League. Gillespie's most memorable goal for Sheffield United came against Charlton, where he scored the winner in the 88th minute with a stunning volley from 25 yards. This goal was also a nominee for the December Goal of the Month competition, which Paul Scholes eventually won.

On 20 January 2007, during a Premier League match against Reading at the Madejski Stadium, Gillespie was sent off for violent conduct, "throwing an elbow in the direction of" Reading's Stephen Hunt, "within 10 seconds" of coming on as a substitute - play had not even restarted following the substitution. As he made his way off the pitch, Gillespie "threw another punch" at Hunt. He submitted a transfer request soon afterwards, but in July of that year Gillespie recanted and signed a new two-year contract.

In July 2008, he limped out of a pre-season friendly at Bury and missed the start of the 2008–09 season. Having regained fitness he was unable to regain a first team place and was eventually loaned out to Charlton Athletic. He made only six appearances for the Addicks before being recalled to Bramall Lane as cover for mounting injuries.

Despite being recalled to Sheffield United, Gillespie failed to make another appearance and on 30 January 2009 his contract was terminated by mutual consent. He went to Bradford City with whose manager Stuart McCall Gillespie had been a teammate at Sheffield United. However, McCall insisted Gillespie was only training with the club to stay fit and help out the younger players, and not on trial.

=== Bradford City ===
Gillespie impressed McCall during training and told the manager he was very keen to gain match experience; as a result, Gillespie signed for Bradford City in March for the rest of the 2008–09 season. Gillespie was an unused substitute in their 1–0 defeat to Exeter City and so had to wait for his debut which came as a second-half substitute with City already 4–1 down to AFC Bournemouth three days later. After just three appearances Gillespie was not offered a long-term deal by Bradford City. In the summer of 2009 he had a trial with Hungarian side Ferencváros and had been linked with a move to the IFA Premiership.

=== Glentoran ===
In 2009, Gillespie made a shock move to the east Belfast club, Glentoran. It was believed that Gillespie's agents approached Glentoran. He made his debut for Glentoran against Ballymena United in the league, he had previously played for Glentoran the night before for the reserves against Ballymena; Glentoran lost 2–1 in his 1st senior appearance for, at the time, the current league champions. In June 2010, the club announced that Gillespie was to leave after just one season after he and the club failed to agree terms on a new deal.

=== Shamrock Rovers ===
In August 2010, Gillespie's former international teammate Michael O'Neill invited him to play in a friendly for Shamrock Rovers in a reserve game against his first club, Manchester United.

=== Darlington ===
In October 2010, Gillespie joined up with Conference National side Darlington, later signing with the club. He made three appearances before being released on 23 December 2010.

=== Longford Town ===
On 24 March 2011, Gillespie signed for League of Ireland First Division side Longford Town. Gillespie made his debut from the bench in a local derby against Athlone Town on 2 April with Gillespie's new side coming out on top by two goals to nil.

He was named on the League of Ireland First Division team of the season for 2012 and was also awarded Longford Town F.C. player of the year, as they lost in the promotion playoffs to Waterford United.

Gillespie scored his one and only Longford goal in May 2013 against Cobh Ramblers. Injuries hampered Gillespie during the 2013 season and he announced his retirement prior to the season's end. His final appearance was as a substitute during Longford's 3–1 victory at home to Finn Harps on 7 September 2013.

=== FC Mindwell ===
Gillespie came out of retirement in 2020, aged 45, to play for newly-formed Mid-Ulster Football League side FC Mindwell, a team set up to raise awareness of mental health issues.

== International career ==
Gillespie is currently eleventh place in the list of appearances for Northern Ireland with 86 caps. He made his debut in September 1994 in a 2–1 home defeat by Portugal. He played an important role in his country's 3–2 qualifying win against Spain at Windsor Park on 6 September 2006. Gillespie was investigated by the Irish FA for his involvement in a fracas with George McCartney on the trip back home from a game in Iceland in September 2007. He was not involved with the Northern Ireland set-up since being omitted from the squad that faced San Marino in February 2009. His final cap was won in a 2–0 defeat by Hungary at Windsor Park in November 2008.

=== International goals ===
Scores and results list Northern Ireland's goal tally first, score column indicates score after each Gillespie goal.

List of international goals scored by Keith Gillespie
No.	Date	Venue	Opponent	Score	Result	Competition
1	12 October 1994	Vienna, Austria	Austria	1–0	2–1	UEFA Euro 1996 qualifying
2	8 October 2005	Belfast, Northern Ireland	Wales	1–2	2–3	2006 FIFA World Cup qualification

== Personal life ==
Gillespie was declared legally bankrupt on 1 October 2010 by the Belfast High Court. In 2013, he released his autobiography, How Not to Be a Football Millionaire, in which he describes his gambling addiction, estimating he lost more than £7 million. Reviewer Robbie Meredith of When Saturday Comes wrote that "It is too cliched to claim that Gillespie achieves redemption at the end of his tale. Rather he gains the uncertain gift of a better understanding of himself. In doing so, he provides a compelling glimpse into the dark void inherent in the modern age of adrenaline-fuelled football celebrity". Gillespie has supported the Gambling with Lives charity, which calls for tighter regulation of gambling and offers support for people with gambling problems.

== Honours ==
Manchester United

- FA Charity Shield: 1994
- FA Youth Cup: 1992

Blackburn Rovers

- Football League Cup: 2001–02

Glentoran

- Irish League Cup: 2009–10

Individual

- PFAI First Division Team of the Year: 2012
- Longford Town Supporters Player of the Year: 2012
