= Matt Jansen =

English footballer

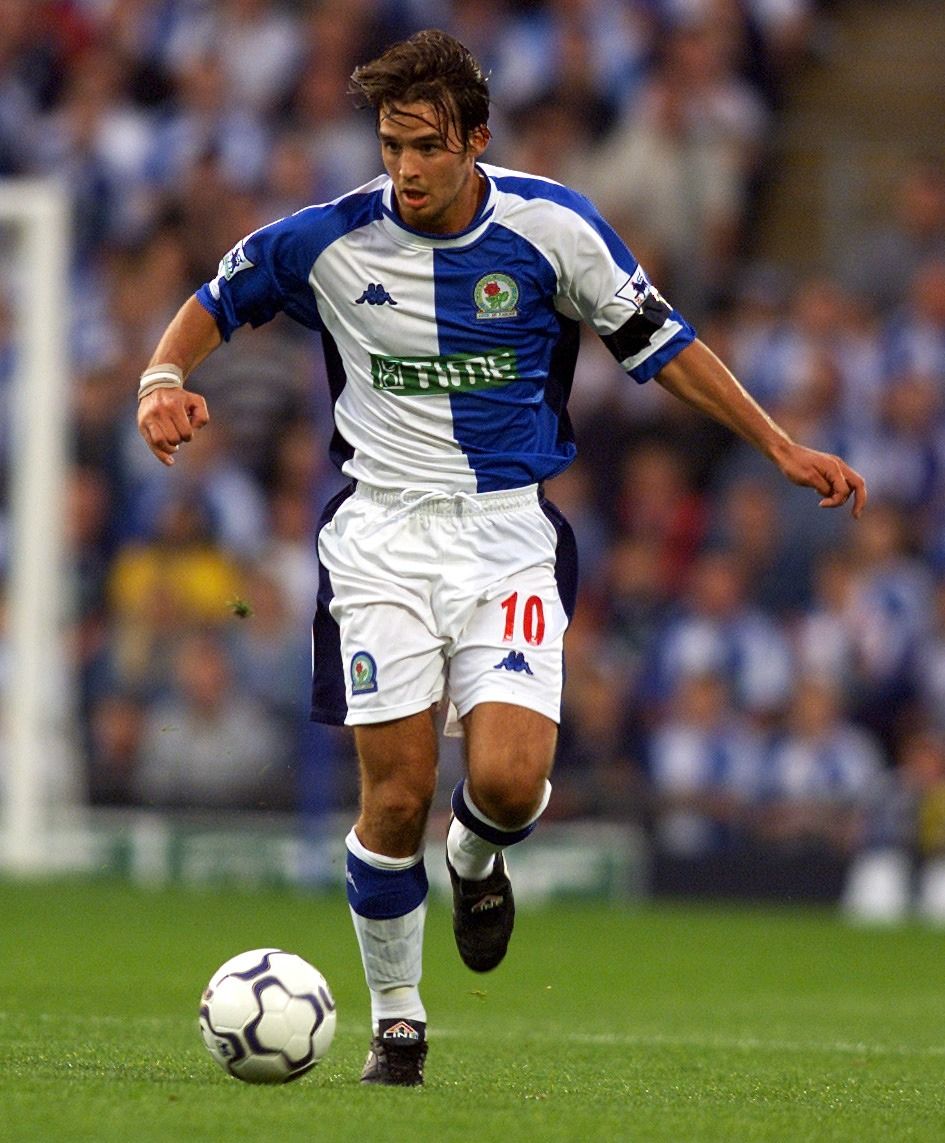
- Jansen playing for Blackburn Rovers

Personal information
- Full name: Matthew Brooke Jansen
- Date of birth: 20 October 1977 (age 49)
- Place of birth: Carlisle, England
- Height: 5 ft 11 in (1.80 m)
- Position: Striker

Youth career
- 1993–1995: Carlisle United

Senior career*
Years	Team	Apps	(Gls)
1995–1998	Carlisle United	42	(10)
1998–1999	Crystal Palace	26	(10)
1999–2006	Blackburn Rovers	153	(44)
2003	→ Coventry City (loan)	9	(2)
2006	Bolton Wanderers	6	(0)
2009	Wrexham	3	(1)
2009–2010	Leigh Genesis	30	(10)
2010–2014	Chorley	36	(4)
Total		305	(81)

International career
1999–2000	England U21	6	(0)

Managerial career
- 2015–2018: Chorley
- * Club domestic league appearances and goals

Matthew Brooke Jansen (born 20 October 1977) is an English former professional footballer who played as a striker.

Jansen was tipped to become one of English football brightest stars but his career was cruelly cut short following a motorcycle accident which almost cost him his life.

A highly regarded centre forward, he was named Blackburn Rovers’ Player of the Season three times and twice finished as the club’s leading scorer. His early performances drew interest from Juventus, Arsenal, Newcastle United and Manchester United.

He launched his career with hometown club Carlisle United but his goalscoring abilities earned him a move to Crystal Palace and the Premier League where he immediately hit the ground running.

His performances caught the eye of Sir Alex Ferguson but he opted for a move to Blackburn Rovers where he played for seven years including a goalscoring performance for Blackburn in their League Cup victory over Tottenham in 2002.

In 2002, after narrowly missing out on a place in the England World Cup squad, he flew to Rome for a holiday and was involved in a motorcycle accident that left him fighting for his life.

Jansen recovered but his sustained a head injury which changed him as a player. He tried a loan spell with Coventry City before moving to Bolton Wanderers on a free but never felt confident.

Jansen teamed up with former teammate Dean Saunders at Wrexham but was still struggling to come to terms with his accident finally playing for former teammate Gary Flitcroft at Leigh Genesis, and Chorley. He later went on to manage Chorley from 2015 to 2018. Jansen's career was one of two halves, the first full of promise and the second denied fulfilment by fate.

== Early life ==
Jansen was born in Carlisle, Cumbria. He supported Newcastle United as a boy. He attended the independent Austin Friars school in Carlisle, where he played scrum-half for the school's Rugby union team, before completing his GCSEs and taking an A-level at Newman Catholic School.

== Football career ==
=== Carlisle United ===
A creative player, Jansen's career started at his home town club of Carlisle United, where he scored 10 league goals. In 1997, he was part of the Carlisle side that earned promotion to the Second Division after finishing third. During the same season he also won his first piece of silverware as he came on late in extra time at Wembley for Carlisle's win against Colchester United in the 1997 Football League Trophy Final.

=== Crystal Palace ===
His performances at Carlisle had heads turning in higher leagues and he turned down the chance to join Manchester United before signing for then Premier League club Crystal Palace in 1998 for £1 million.

=== Blackburn Rovers ===
His impressive displays at Crystal Palace earned him a move to Premier League side Blackburn Rovers for £4.1 million. Jansen showed signs of things to come when he scored against Tottenham Hotspur on his debut in January 1999.

Blackburn were relegated to the First Division in Jansen's first season, but he was the star of the team which won promotion back to the Premier League in the 2000–01 season, finishing as the league's second top scorer, after Fulham's Louis Saha, with 23 goals. He continued to impress in the following season, scoring the first goal in Blackburn's 2–1 League Cup final victory against Tottenham Hotspur in 2002. His good form led to an England call-up for the friendly game against Paraguay. However, he missed out on what would be his only International football match for his nation due to a stomach bug.

A motorcycle accident in Rome, Italy during the summer of 2002 nearly killed Jansen and long-term hospitalisation followed (he spent six days in a coma). In the seasons after the accident he struggled to regain his place in the Blackburn side which led to him being loaned to Coventry City in 2003, where he scored two goals in nine appearances. He made another attempt to force his way into the Blackburn team at the start of the 2004–05 season, scoring two goals in eight appearances. However, it was felt that he had still not recovered mentally from the accident and was struggling to cope with the pressures of Premier League football. As a result, Blackburn decided it best for him take another break from football and sent him to visit a sports psychiatrist in the US.

In May 2005, Jansen signed a two-year 'pay as you play' contract with Blackburn, suggesting that the club was ready to give him one final chance to establish himself in the team after his injury, and he returned to action in a pre-season friendly against Morecambe in July 2005. In October 2005, Preston North End made an enquiry about Jansen, however this came to nothing.

Jansen again struggled to gain a first-team place for Blackburn once the season started. The club agreed to release him from his contract on 11 January 2006.

=== Bolton Wanderers ===
Two days after release by Blackburn he signed for Bolton Wanderers on a six-month contract, amid interest from Everton, Manchester City and Wigan Athletic. However, his stay at the Reebok Stadium was not a success and he was released in May of the same year.

=== Out of contract ===
In the summer of 2006, Jansen had a trial with Los Angeles Galaxy. Bolton manager Sam Allardyce invited the player back to England and he continued to train with Bolton. In the summer of 2007 he returned to his original club, Carlisle United, to train in an attempt to regain his fitness.

Despite developing other business interests such as property, Jansen did not rule out a return to professional football, saying in July 2008, "I'm keeping myself reasonably fit...we'll see what happens."

In November 2008, Blackburn announced that Jansen would return in a casual agreement to help regain fitness in a bid to have one last go at reclaiming the promising and glittering career he once had in professional football. Having trained with the club for two months, he left Brockhall with the arrival of new manager Allardyce. Jansen was present at the club's Premier League game with Newcastle United when he also featured in a pre-recorded half-time lottery draw broadcast on the club television station as part of the half-time "entertainment".

On 18 February 2009, he joined League One club Huddersfield Town on trial and was given a run-out in their reserve match against Rotherham United the same day, in which he scored the opening goal of a 2–2 draw.

=== Wrexham ===
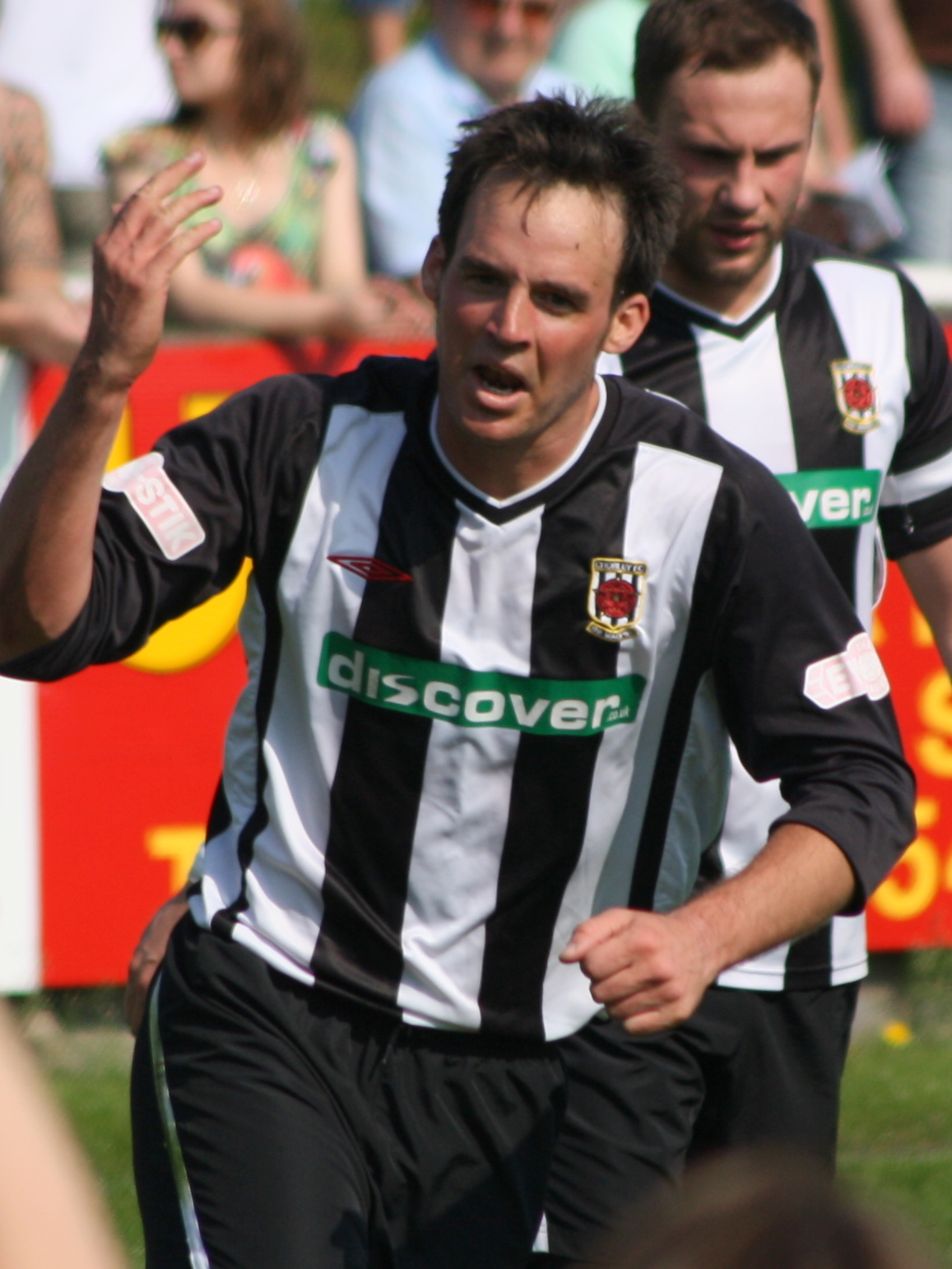
Jansen playing for Chorley in 2011

On 11 March 2009, he agreed a deal with Conference Premier club Wrexham until the end of the season, scoring once against Northwich Victoria.

=== Leigh Genesis ===
In the close season of 2009, Jansen joined up with former teammate Garry Flitcroft, then manager of NPL Division One North side Leigh Genesis and played for them in the 2009–10 season, but when Flitcroft left to take over the reins at Leigh's rivals Chorley in May 2010, Jansen soon followed along with a number of other Genesis players.

=== Chorley ===
Jansen scored his first Chorley goal, an acrobatic scissor kick, against old club Bolton Wanderers in a 1–1 pre-season draw at Victory Park. During the 2010–11 season in the Northern Premier League Division One he played 20 league games and scored three league goals. He would also start both play-off games which led to the club's promotion to the Northern Premier League Premier Division.

== Managerial career ==
Jansen was assistant manager when Chorley went on to win the Northern Premier League Premier Division in 2013–14.

In July 2015, Jansen became Chorley's first team manager after Flitcroft's resignation due to other commitments. He guided them to 8th place in the National League North in his first season in charge, before reaching the play-off final in 2016–17, narrowly losing after extra time to FC Halifax Town. On 22 June 2018, he resigned from his role as manager of the club.

In October 2020, he joined National League side Stockport County as Head of Recruitment and Player Liaison.

== International career ==
Jansen played six times for the England under-21 team without scoring. In 2002, he was called up by Sven-Göran Eriksson to play for the senior squad for a friendly against Paraguay, but was unable to play due to a stomach infection. He was also expected to go to the 2002 World Cup; he was invited to David Beckham's send-off party and had his competition suit measured, but Eriksson ultimately decided to take defender Martin Keown instead.

== Career statistics ==
Matt Jansen at the English National Football Archive (subscription required)

Club	Season	League			FA Cup		League Cup		Other		Total	
Club	Season	Division	Apps	Goals	Apps	Goals	Apps	Goals	Apps	Goals	Apps	Goals
Carlisle United	1996–97	Division Three	19	1	3	0	1	0	4 (Note: Appearance(s) in Football League Trophy)	0	27	1
Carlisle United	1997–98	Division Two	23	9	1	0	4	3	2	0	30	12
Carlisle United	Total		42	10	4	0	5	3	6	0	57	13
Crystal Palace	1997–98	Premier League	8	3	—		—		—		8	3
Crystal Palace	1998–99	Division One	18	7	1	0	4	0	2 (Note: Appearance(s) in UEFA Intertoto Cup)	0	25	7
Crystal Palace	Total		26	10	1	0	4	0	2	0	33	10
Blackburn Rovers	1998–99	Premier League	11	3	—		—		—		11	3
Blackburn Rovers	1999–2000	Division One	30	4	1	1	2	2	—		33	7
Blackburn Rovers	2000–01	Division One	40	23	6	1	2	0	—		48	24
Blackburn Rovers	2001–02	Premier League	35	10	3	0	5	6	—		43	16
Blackburn Rovers	2002–03	Premier League	7	0	2	2	3	0	1 (Note: Appearance(s) in UEFA Cup)	0	13	2
Blackburn Rovers	2003–04	Premier League	19	2	0	0	0	0	2	1	21	3
Blackburn Rovers	2004–05	Premier League	7	2	0	0	1	0	—		8	2
Blackburn Rovers	2005–06	Premier League	4	0	0	0	1	0	—		5	0
Blackburn Rovers	Total		153	44	12	4	14	8	3	1	182	57
Coventry City (loan)	2002–03	Division One	9	2	—		—		—		9	2
Bolton Wanderers	2005–06	Premier League	6	0	1	0	—		0	0	7	0
Wrexham	2008–09	Conference Premier	3	1	—		—		—		3	1
Leigh Genesis	2009–10	Northern Premier League Division One North	30	10	1	0	—		4 (Note: Two appearances in FA Trophy; one appearance one goal in Lancashire FA Challenge Trophy; one appearance in Northern Premier League President's Cup)	1	35	11
Chorley	2010–11	Northern Premier League Division One North	20	3	0	0	—		8 (Note: Three appearances one goal in FA Trophy; two appearances in Northern Premier League Challenge Cup; one appearance in Lancashire FA Challenge Trophy; two appearances in Northern Premier League Division One North play-offs)	1	28	4
Chorley	2011–12	Northern Premier League Premier Division	4	1	0	0	—		3 (Note: One appearance in FA Trophy; one appearance in Northern Premier League Challenge Cup; one appearance in Lancashire FA Challenge Trophy)	0	7	1
Chorley	2012–13	Northern Premier League Premier Division	9	0	0	0	—		2 (Note: One appearance in FA Trophy; one appearance in Lancashire FA Challenge Trophy)	0	11	0
Chorley	2013–14	Northern Premier League Premier Division	2	0	0	0	—		2 (Note: One appearance in Northern Premier League Challenge Cup; one appearance in Lancashire FA Challenge Trophy)	0	4	0
Chorley	2014–15	Conference North	1	0	0	0	—		0	0	1	0
Chorley	Total		36	4	0	0	—		15	1	51	5
Career total			305	81	19	4	23	11	30	3	377	99

== Managerial statistics ==
As of 10 October 2018

Managerial record by team and tenure
Team	From	To	Record				
Team	From	To	G	W	D	L	Win %
Chorley	2 July 2015	22 June 2018	143	62	40	41	43.36
Total			143	62	40	41	43.36

== Honours ==
Carlisle United

- Football League Trophy: 1996–97

Blackburn Rovers

- Football League Cup: 2001–02
- Football League First Division runner-up: 2000–01

Individual

- PFA Team of the Year: 2000–01 First Division
