= 1997–98 Carlisle United F.C. season =

Carlisle United F.C.
1997–98 season
- Chairman: Michael Knighton
- Manager: Michael Knighton; Dave Wilkes (caretaker manager)
- Second Division: 23rd (relegated)
- FA Cup: First round
- League Cup: Second round
- Football League Trophy: Quarter-final
- Average home league attendance: 5,440

For the 1997–98 season, Carlisle United F.C. competed in Football League Division Two.

== Results & fixtures ==
=== Football League Second Division ===
==== League table ====
Pos	Team	Pld	W	D	L	GF	GA	GD	Pts	Promotion or relegation
20	Burnley	46	13	13	20	55	65	−10	52	
21	Brentford (R)	46	11	17	18	50	71	−21	50	Relegation to the Third Division
22	Plymouth Argyle (R)	46	12	13	21	55	70	−15	49	Relegation to the Third Division
23	Carlisle United (R)	46	12	8	26	57	73	−16	44	Relegation to the Third Division
24	Southend United (R)	46	11	10	25	47	79	−32	43	Relegation to the Third Division

Rules for classification: In the Football League goals scored (GF) takes precedence over goal difference (GD).
(R) Relegated

==== Matches ====
Match Day	Date	Opponent	H/A	Score	Carlisle United Scorer(s)	Attendance	Report
1	9 August	Southend United	A	1–1		4,507	
2	16 August	Watford	H	0–2		7,395	
3	23 August	Bristol Rovers	A	1–3		6,044	
4	30 August	Northampton Town	H	0–2		6,307	
5	2 September	Wigan Athletic	H	1–0		5,352	
6	7 September	Blackpool	A	1–2		7,259	
7	13 September	Wycombe Wanderers	A	4–1		6,018	
8	20 September	Plymouth Argyle	H	2–2		5,667	
9	27 September	Gillingham	H	2–1		5,063	
10	4 October	Walsall	A	1–3		3,957	
11	11 October	Burnley	A	1–3		10,687	
12	17 October	Preston North End	H	0–2		6,541	
13	21 October	Luton Town	H	0–1		4,341	
14	25 October	York City	A	3–4		3,700	
15	1 November	Wrexham	H	2–2		4,464	
16	4 November	Brentford	A	1–0		3,424	
17	8 November	Millwall	A	1–1		6,959	
18	18 November	Chesterfield	H	0–2		3,591	
19	22 November	Bournemouth	A	2–3		3,709	
20	29 November	Bristol City	H	0–3		5,044	
21	2 December	Oldham Athletic	A	1–3		4,449	
22	13 December	Fulham	H	2–0		4,574	
23	20 December	Grimsby Town	H	0–1		6,222	
24	26 December	Blackpool	H	1–1		8,010	
25	28 December	Wigan Athletic	A	2–0		4,511	
26	10 January	Southend United	H	5–0		5,389	
27	17 January	Northampton Town	A	1–2		6,327	
28	24 January	Bristol Rovers	H	3–1		5,725	
29	31 January	Wycombe Wanderers	H	0–0		6,220	
30	7 February	Plymouth Argyle	A	1–2		4,540	
31	14 February	Walsall	H	1–1		4,530	
32	21 February	Gillingham	A	0–1		6,270	
33	24 February	Preston North End	A	3–0		8,985	
34	28 February	Burnley	H	2–1		7,192	
35	3 March	Millwall	H	1–0		5,217	
36	7 March	Wrexham	A	2–2		4,242	
37	14 March	Brentford	H	1–2		6,021	
38	17 March	Watford	A	1–2		7,274	
39	21 March	Chesterfield	A	1–2		3,967	
40	28 March	Bournemouth	H	0–1		4,951	
41	4 April	Bristol City	A	0–1		12,578	
42	11 April	Oldham Athletic	H	3–1		4,594	
43	13 April	Fulham	A	0–5		9,243	
44	21 April	Grimsby Town	H	0–1		3,956	
45	25 April	York City	H	1–2		3,897	
46	2 May	Luton Town	A	2–3		6,729	

=== Football League Cup ===
Round	Date	Opponent	H/A	Score	Carlisle United Scorer(s)	Attendance	Report
R1 L1	11 August	Chester City	A	2–1		5,116	
R1 L2	18 August	Chester City	H	3–0		2,106	
R2 L1	17 September	Tottenham Hotspur	A	2–3		19,255	
R2 L2	30 September	Tottenham Hotspur	H	0–2		13,571	

=== FA Cup ===
Round	Date	Opponent	H/A	Score	Carlisle United Scorer(s)	Attendance	Report
R1	15 November	Wigan Athletic	H	0–1		5,182	

=== Football League Trophy ===
Round	Date	Opponent	H/A	Score	Carlisle United Scorer(s)	Attendance	Report
R1	9 December	Oldham Athletic	H	1–0 (aet)		1,518	
R2	6 January	Rochdale	H	6–1		2,350	
QF	3 February	Burnley	A	1–4		4,573	
