= 2002 Football League Cup final =

- Match programme cover
- Event: 2001–02 Football League Cup
Blackburn Rovers	Tottenham Hotspur
2	1
- Date: 24 February 2002
- Venue: Millennium Stadium, Cardiff
- Man of the Match: Brad Friedel (Blackburn Rovers)
- Referee: Graham Poll (Hertfordshire)
- Attendance: 72,500

The 2002 Football League Cup final was played between Blackburn Rovers and Tottenham Hotspur at the Millennium Stadium, Cardiff, on Sunday, 24 February 2002. Blackburn won the match 2–1 in what was the club's first appearance in the competition's final.

Tottenham were forced to produce a one-off yellow shirt for the final when The Football League decided both of their home and away strips, respectively white and light blue, clashed with Blackburn's blue-and-white home strip.

Blackburn were without defender Craig Short and midfielders Gary Flitcroft and Tugay Kerimoğlu due to suspension. This led to 38 year-old veteran striker Mark Hughes starting in central midfield. Blackburn were also without injured back-up goalkeeper Alan Kelly and cup-tied right-back Lucas Neill.

Blackburn opened the scoring with a goal from Matt Jansen, but Christian Ziege soon equalised for Spurs. Andy Cole scored the winner in the 68th minute with a typical instinctive strike after mistakes in the Spurs defence, mainly from Ledley King. Les Ferdinand could have made the match square after a close one-on-one chance with Friedel, but failed to make anything of it. In the final minute Teddy Sheringham had a claim for a penalty turned down by referee Graham Poll.

== Road to Cardiff ==
Blackburn Rovers
Round 2	Blackburn	2–0	Oldham
Round 3	Blackburn	2–1 (a.e.t.)	Middlesbrough
Round 4	Blackburn	2–0	Manchester City
Quarter-final	Blackburn	4–0	Arsenal
Semi-final (1st leg)	Sheffield Wednesday	1–2	Blackburn
Semi-final (2nd leg)	Blackburn	4–2	Sheffield Wednesday
Note:	(Blackburn won 6–3 on aggregate)		

Tottenham Hotspur
Round 2	Tottenham	2–0	Torquay
Round 3	Tranmere	0–4	Tottenham
Round 4	Fulham	1–2	Tottenham
Quarter-final	Tottenham	6–0	Bolton
Semi-final (1st leg)	Chelsea	2–1	Tottenham
Semi-final (2nd leg)	Tottenham	5–1	Chelsea
Note:	(Tottenham won 6–3 on aggregate)		

== Match ==
=== Details ===
24 February 2002
15:00 GMT

Blackburn Rovers	2–1	Tottenham Hotspur
Jansen 25'; Cole 68'	Report	Ziege 33'

Millennium Stadium, Cardiff
Attendance: 72,500
Referee: Graham Poll (Hertfordshire)

Blackburn Rovers	Tottenham Hotspur

GK	1	(United States) Brad Friedel
RB	28	(England) Martin Taylor
CB	4	(Norway) Henning Berg (c)
CB	14	(Sweden) Nils-Eric Johansson
LB	5	(Norway) Stig Inge Bjørnebye
RM	18	(Northern Ireland) Keith Gillespie	(substituted off) 75'
CM	12	(Wales) Mark Hughes
CM	8	(England) David Dunn
LM	11	(Republic of Ireland) Damien Duff
CF	9	(England) Andy Cole
CF	10	(England) Matt Jansen	(substituted off) 74'
Substitutes:
GK	27	(England) Alan Miller
DF	2	(England) John Curtis
MF	15	(England) Craig Hignett	(substituted on) 75'
MF	16	(Republic of Ireland) Alan Mahon
FW	17	(Spain) Yordi	(substituted on) 74'
Manager:
(Scotland) Graeme Souness

GK	1	(Scotland) Neil Sullivan
RWB	3	(Argentina) Mauricio Taricco	Yellow card	(substituted off) 79'
CB	26	(England) Ledley King
CB	6	(England) Chris Perry
CB	18	(Wales) Ben Thatcher
LWB	23	(Germany) Christian Ziege	Yellow card
CM	7	(England) Darren Anderton
CM	8	(England) Tim Sherwood	Yellow card
AM	14	(Uruguay) Gustavo Poyet		(substituted off) 84'
CF	10	(England) Teddy Sheringham (c)
CF	9	(England) Les Ferdinand
Substitutes:
GK	13	(United States) Kasey Keller
DF	30	(England) Anthony Gardner
MF	29	(Wales) Simon Davies		(substituted on) 79'
FW	11	(Ukraine) Serhii Rebrov
FW	16	(Norway) Steffen Iversen		(substituted on) 84'
Manager:
(England) Glenn Hoddle

Man of the match

- Brad Friedel (Blackburn Rovers)

Match rules

- 90 minutes
- 30 minutes of extra-time if necessary
- Penalty shootout if scores still level
- Five named substitutes
- Maximum of three substitutions
