= 1994–95 Blackburn Rovers F.C. season =

Blackburn Rovers
1994–95 season
- Owner: Jack Walker
- Chairman: Robert Coar
- Manager: Kenny Dalglish
- Stadium: Ewood Park
- Premiership: 1st (champions)
- FA Cup: Third round
- League Cup: Fourth round
- Charity Shield: Runners-up
- UEFA Cup: First round
- Top goalscorer: League: Alan Shearer (34); All: Alan Shearer (37)
- Highest home attendance: 30,545 (vs. Newcastle United, 7 May 1995)
- Lowest home attendance: 14,517 (vs. Birmingham City, 20 September 1994)
Home colours	Away colours

The 1994–95 season was Blackburn Rovers F.C.'s third season in the Premier League, and their third consecutive season in the top division of English football.

The season was marked by the club winning the Premier League title, ending their 81-year run without an English league title. They ended up winning the title by a one-point margin over Manchester United. Rovers led the way for most of the season, but a 2–1 defeat at Kenny Dalglish's old club Liverpool at Anfield on the final day of the season briefly appeared to threaten their title hopes. Manchester United however could only draw 1–1 at West Ham so the league title was back at Blackburn for the first time since 1914. Jack Walker's dream had come true: within five years of buying the club, he had taken them from strugglers in the old Second Division to champions of England.

Early exits from the League Cup, FA Cup and UEFA Cup to Liverpool, Newcastle and Trelleborg respectively were frustrating for Rovers in 1994–95 but turned out for the best as they could concentrate on the league challenge.

Kenny Dalglish won the Premier League Manager of the Year award for leading Blackburn to success, Alan Shearer won both the Golden Boot for contributing 34 of Blackburn's 80 league goals and also the PFA Players' Player of the Year award as nominated by his fellow professionals. Tim Flowers, Graeme Le Saux, Colin Hendry, Tim Sherwood, Chris Sutton and Shearer, all made it into the PFA Team of the Year.

== Review ==
=== August ===
Blackburn started the campaign with a 1–1 draw away to Southampton; in his debut, Chris Sutton could have been on the score sheet as early as the second minute but fired wide. It was the home side who took the lead, however, when, in the fifteenth minute, Nicky Banger controlled a box-to-box pass from Matt Le Tissier before firing home. A minute later Sutton had the chance to equalise, but this time headed wide from a Graeme Le Saux cross. Blackburn equalised in the second half when, in the 60th minute, Sutton headed the ball down to Alan Shearer who side-footed the ball past Bruce Grobbelaar.

Blackburn recorded their first victory of the season just three days later at Ewood Park, running out 3–0 winners against Leicester City. Chris Sutton got the first goal and his first for his new club in the 19th minute when he headed in Shearer's delicately flighted chip. Henning Berg doubled the advantage in the 59th minute when he knocked in Sutton's flick on from close range. The points were wrapped up in the 74th minute when Robbie Slater's shot hit the post and fell straight to Shearer, who swept the ball home.

Coventry City were the next visitors, and suffered a similar fate to Leicester, going down 4–0. Chris Sutton netted a hat-trick: the first a header in the 67h minute, the second a right-footed effort in the 74th and finally tapping home from close range after good work by Shearer in the 88th. Jason Wilcox got the other goal with a 20-yard effort that went in off the post.

Blackburn again dropped points, this time in a 0–0 draw away to Arsenal. In a match that was dominated by Arsenal, who were let down by poor finishing, the main talking point was the sending off of Jason Wilcox in the 53rd minute for a second yellow. After defender Colin Hendry was forced off with a head wound, Chris Sutton was called on to play at centre-back, a job he proved to be more than comfortable with.

=== September ===
Due to an international break, Rovers' next game was in the second week of September. The match was played at Ewood Park; the opposition, Everton, received the same treatment as previous visitors, leaving home on the back of a 3–0 defeat. Shearer got the first after 17 minutes, latching onto Tim Flowers' clearance before running at the Everton defence and shooting in the bottom left corner. Shearer was the provider for the second just before half time, crossing to the back post for an unmarked Jason Wilcox to blast home, and it was Shearer again who made sure of the points in the 60th minute, converting a penalty after Sutton had been brought down. The match is notable for being the first game to feature Everton's new signing Daniel Amokachi of Nigeria, the first black player at the club in over 20 years. As the score reflected, Amokachi proved no match for the Blackburn defence who seemed to tackle him very easily and he did not threaten goal in the entire match.

Trelleborg (home)

Blackburn bounced back from their European disappointment, winning 2–1 away at Chelsea. Blackburn took the lead through an own goal in the 26th minute and looked likely to score more, but Chelsea equalised in the 56th minute through John Spencer, the first league goal that Blackburn had conceded in seven hours. Just eleven minutes later Chris Sutton headed in Robbie Slater's cross to restore the lead, and from there on in there was only one victor.

Aston Villa were the next visitors to Ewood, and bettered previous opposition by at least scoring, although still going down 3–1. In the 17th minute Sutton was fouled by Ugo Ehiogu and Shearer confidently struck the penalty beyond Mark Bosnich to give Blackburn the lead. The second, in the 55th minute, saw Shearer return the favour when his shot from Stuart Ripley's cross thumped off Ehiogu's chest and Sutton got his toe to it, poking it beyond Bosnich. The duo combined again for the 71st-minute third goal: Sutton gathered a long clearance from Tim Flowers and laid the pass precisely into Shearer's path, who easily went past Ehiogu to thump a 15-yard shot into the net. The Villa defender did manage to get a consolation goal in injury time.

Trelleborg (away)

=== October ===
Following on from their midweek European failure, Blackburn lost their first game away to Norwich City 2–1. Blackburn took the lead and, following his £5m move, inevitably it was Chris Sutton who got the first goal, rolling the ball gently past Bryan Gunn in the fourth minute. Norwich fought back, however, and goals from Mark Bowen and Jon Newsome either side of halftime handed them the win and Blackburn their first league defeat.

Blackburn's title challenge continued to stutter in the next match with a 1–1 away to leaders Newcastle United. Rovers took the lead through a 57th-minute penalty from Shearer after Wilcox had been brought down by Newcastle goalkeeper Pavel Srnicek. Blackburn looked to be leaving with all three points, but Newcastle scrambled an equaliser just two minutes from time: Colin Hendry unintentionally flicked on Scott Sellars' corner and the ball fell to Steve Howey. His shot was cleared off the line by Jason Wilcox, only to rebound into the net off the back of Tim Flowers.

Blackburn returned to winning ways against Liverpool, coming out 3–2 winners in a match between the teams placed third and fourth in the Premiership pre-match. Liverpool took the lead through Robbie Fowler's deflected 30th-minute shot, a lead they kept until halftime. The match was turned on its head soon after halftime when Shearer made two goals with crosses from the right of the area that were touched home by Mark Atkins in the 52nd minute and Sutton in the 57th. The lead did not last long as John Barnes scored an overhead kick from Stig Inge Bjørnebye's cross just two minutes later, but Sutton scored what proved to be the winner in the 73rd minute by blasting in from a tight angle after his first effort was blocked by Neil Ruddock.

Blackburn's unbeaten home League record went the next game when they lost 4–2 to Manchester United. Blackburn took the lead after 13 minutes: Eric Cantona handled on the right touchline and, when Graeme Le Saux's cross entered the area, Peter Schmeichel punched the ball out straight to Paul Warhurst, who returned it with a deft chip off 30 yards into the top of the goal. As Blackburn appeared on the brink of an unbreakable hold, the tone of the match was irretrievably altered when Henning Berg brought down Lee Sharpe in the area. The penalty decision, later shown to be incorrect as Berg had played the ball, was compounded by Berg's sending off. Cantona scored the penalty into the left-hand corner. Blackburn regained the lead after 50 minutes when Colin Hendry scored with a powerful header from Le Saux's cross, but the lead lastly barely a minute as Andrei Kanchelskis broke in from the right and, after his attempt at a cross was blocked by Hendry, the winger pounced on the loose ball and hit a left-foot half-volley past Tim Flowers. After 66 minutes it was 3–2 when Le Saux committed an error playing a ball to the unmarked Mark Hughes, who saw Flowers off his line and delicately chipped over the stranded goalkeeper. Rovers pushed for an equaliser, but Kanchelskis broke away in the 82nd minute to secure the points.

Things didn't get any easier for Blackburn as they then faced an away trip to Nottingham Forest, who were unbeaten and had a 24-game unbeaten record in all competitions. In a hard fought, entertaining competitive match, Blackburn came out 2–0 victors. Sutton gave Blackburn the lead in the eighth minute, capitalising on Forest's failure to clear the ball on the edge of their area by thumping a right-foot shot on the turn. The second goal came from a corner, swung over by Ripley to Shearer, whose apparent mishit on the turn fell neatly for Sutton to smash the ball past Mark Crossley in the 68th minute. Jason Wilcox was sent for two bookable offences — the second, in the 87th minute, for time wasting.

== FA Charity Shield ==
Due to Manchester United completing the Double of Premier League and FA Cup in 1993–94, Blackburn Rovers faced them in the season's annual curtain raiser – the FA Charity Shield, as they finished as runners-up in the 1993–94 Premier League. United won the match 2–0 with goals from Eric Cantona and Paul Ince.

14 August 1994
16:00 UTC+1

Blackburn Rovers	0–2	Manchester United
	Report	Cantona 22' (pen.); Ince 81'

Wembley Stadium, London
Attendance: 60,402
Referee: Philip Don (Middlesex)

== Awards ==
Despite leading his team to Premier league glory, Kenny Dalglish only won the Premier League Manager of the Month award once. This came in November when he guided Blackburn to four successive wins. The same month also saw Shearer and Sutton jointly win the Premier League Player of the Month award for "| scoring eight goals between them.

Kenny Dalglish won the Premier League Manager of the Year award for leading Blackburn to title success, Alan Shearer won both the Golden Boot and the PFA Players' Player of the Year award as nominated by his fellow professionals.

Tim Flowers, Graeme Le Saux, Colin Hendry, Tim Sherwood, Sutton and Shearer, all made it into the PFA Team of the Year.

Blackburn also provided the opposition when Matt Le Tissier scored the eventual Goal of the Season on 10 December 1994, for his famous lob over old teammate Tim Flowers.

== First-team squad ==
Note: Flags indicate national team as defined under FIFA eligibility rules; some limited exceptions apply. Players may hold more than one non-FIFA nationality.

No.	Pos.	Nation	Player
1	GK	ENG	Tim Flowers
2	DF	ENG	Tony Gale
3	DF	IRL	Jeff Kenna
4	MF	ENG	Tim Sherwood (captain)
5	DF	SCO	Colin Hendry
6	DF	ENG	Graeme Le Saux
7	MF	ENG	Stuart Ripley
8	FW	SCO	Kevin Gallacher
9	FW	ENG	Alan Shearer
10	FW	ENG	Mike Newell
11	MF	ENG	Jason Wilcox
12	DF	ENG	Nicky Marker
13	GK	ENG	Bobby Mimms

No.	Pos.	Nation	Player
14	DF	ENG	Lee Makel
15	MF	NED	Richard Witschge (on loan from Bordeaux)
16	FW	ENG	Chris Sutton
17	MF	AUS	Robbie Slater
20	DF	NOR	Henning Berg
21	MF	ENG	Paul Harford
22	MF	ENG	Mark Atkins
23	MF	ENG	David Batty
24	MF	ENG	Paul Warhurst
25	DF	ENG	Ian Pearce
26	GK	AUS	Frank Talia
31	GK	IRL	Shay Given

=== Left club during season ===
Note: Flags indicate national team as defined under FIFA eligibility rules; some limited exceptions apply. Players may hold more than one non-FIFA nationality.

No.	Pos.	Nation	Player
3	DF	ENG	Alan Wright (to Aston Villa)
15	DF	ENG	Richard Brown (to Stockport County)

No.	Pos.	Nation	Player
18	DF	SCO	Andy Morrison (to Blackpool)
19	FW	ENG	Peter Thorne (to Swindon Town)

== Results ==
=== FA Premier League ===
FA Premier League match results
Date	Opponent	Venue	Result F–A	Scorers	Attendance
20 August 1994	Southampton	A	1–1	Shearer	14,209
23 August 1994	Leicester City	H	3–0	Sutton, Berg, Shearer	21,050
27 August 1994	Coventry City	H	4–0	Sutton (3), Wilcox	21,657
31 August 1994	Arsenal	A	0–0		37,629
10 September 1994	Everton	H	3–0	Shearer (2, 1 pen.), Wilcox	26,538
18 September 1994	Chelsea	A	2–1	Johnsen (o.g.), Sutton	17,513
24 September 1994	Aston Villa	H	3–1	Shearer (2, 1 pen.), Sutton	22,694
1 October 1994	Norwich City	A	1–2	Sutton	18,145
9 October 1994	Newcastle United	A	1–1	Shearer (pen.)	33,441
15 October 1994	Liverpool	H	3–2	Atkins, Sutton (2)	30,263
23 October 1994	Manchester United	H	2–4	Warhurst, Hendry	30,260
29 October 1994	Nottingham Forest	A	2–0	Sutton (2)	22,131
2 November 1994	Sheffield Wednesday	A	1–0	Shearer	24,207
5 November 1994	Tottenham Hotspur	H	2–0	Wilcox, Shearer (pen.)	26,933
19 November 1994	Ipswich Town	A	3–1	Sutton, Shearer, Sherwood	17,329
26 November 1994	Queens Park Rangers	H	4–0	Sutton, Shearer (3, 1 pen.)	21,302
3 December 1994	Wimbledon	A	3–0	Atkins, Wilcox, Shearer	12,341
10 December 1994	Southampton	H	3–2	Atkins, Shearer (2)	23,372
17 December 1994	Leicester City	A	0–0		20,559
26 December 1994	Manchester City	A	3–1	Shearer, Atkins, Le Saux	23,387
31 December 1994	Crystal Palace	A	1–0	Sherwood	14,232
2 January 1995	West Ham United	H	4–2	Shearer (3, 2 pens.), Le Saux	25,503
14 January 1995	Nottingham Forest	H	3–0	Warhurst, Wilcox, Chettle (o.g.)	22,131
22 January 1995	Manchester United	A	0–1		43,742
28 January 1995	Ipswich Town	H	4–1	Shearer (3, 1 pen.), Sherwood	21,325
1 February 1995	Leeds United	H	1–1	Shearer (pen.)	28,561
5 February 1995	Tottenham Hotspur	A	1–3	Sherwood	28,124
12 February 1995	Sheffield Wednesday	H	3–1	Sherwood, Atkins, Shearer	22,223
22 February 1995	Wimbledon	H	2–1	Shearer, Atkins	20,586
25 February 1995	Norwich City	H	0–0		25,579
4 March 1995	Aston Villa	A	1–0	Hendry	40,011
8 March 1995	Arsenal	H	3–1	Shearer (2, 1 pen.), Le Saux	23,452
11 March 1995	Coventry City	A	1–1	Shearer	18,547
18 March 1995	Chelsea	H	2–1	Shearer, Sherwood	25,490
1 April 1995	Everton	A	2–1	Sutton, Shearer	37,905
4 April 1995	Queens Park Rangers	A	1–0	Sutton	16,508
15 April 1995	Leeds United	A	1–1	Hendry	39,426
17 April 1995	Manchester City	H	2–3	Shearer, Hendry	27,851
20 April 1995	Crystal Palace	H	2–1	Kenna, Gallacher	28,005
30 April 1995	West Ham United	A	0–2		24,202
8 May 1995	Newcastle United	H	1–0	Shearer	30,545
14 May 1995	Liverpool	A	1–2	Shearer	40,014

Pos	Team	Pld	W	D	L	GF	GA	GD	Pts	Qualification or relegation
1	Blackburn Rovers (C)	42	27	8	7	80	39	+41	89	Qualification for the Champions League group stage
2	Manchester United	42	26	10	6	77	28	+49	88	Qualification for the UEFA Cup first round (Note: Leeds United were rewarded entry to the UEFA Cup through UEFA Fair Play ranking.)
3	Nottingham Forest	42	22	11	9	72	43	+29	77	Qualification for the UEFA Cup first round
4	Liverpool	42	21	11	10	65	37	+28	74	Qualification for the UEFA Cup first round
5	Leeds United	42	20	13	9	59	38	+21	73	Qualification for the UEFA Cup first round

Source: Premier League
Rules for classification: 1) points; 2) goal difference; 3) number of goals scored.
(C) Champions

=== FA Cup ===
FA Cup match results
Date	Round	Opponent	Venue	Result F–A	Scorers	Attendance
8 January 1995	Third round	Newcastle United	A	1–1	Sutton	31,721
18 January 1995	Third round replay	Newcastle United	H	1–2	Sutton	22,658

=== League Cup ===
Football League Cup match results
Date	Round	Opponent	Venue	Result F–A	Scorers	Attendance
20 September 1994	Second round First leg	Birmingham City	H	2–0	Wilcox, Sutton	14,517
4 October 1994	Second round Second leg	Birmingham City	A	1–1	Sutton	16,275
26 October 1994	Third round	Coventry City	H	2–0	Shearer (2)	14,538
30 November 1994	Fourth round	Liverpool	H	1–3	Sutton	30,115

=== UEFA Cup ===
UEFA Cup match results
Date	Round	Opponent	Venue	Result F–A	Scorers	Attendance	Ref.
13 September 1994	First round First Leg	Trelleborg	H	0–1		13,775	
27 September 1994	First round Second Leg	Trelleborg	A	2–2	Sutton, Shearer	6,370	

== Squad stats ==
=== Appearances and goals ===
No.	Pos.	Name	League		FA Cup		League Cup		UEFA Cup		Total
No.	Pos.	Name	Apps	Goals	Apps	Goals	Apps	Goals	Apps	Goals	Apps	Goals
1	GK	(England) Tim Flowers	39	0	0	0	0	0	0	0	39	0
2	DF	(England) Tony Gale	15	0	0	0	0	0	0	0	15	0
3	DF	(England) Alan Wright	4+1	0	0	0	0	0	0	0	4+1	0
3	DF	(Republic of Ireland) Jeff Kenna	9	1	0	0	0	0	0	0	9	1
4	MF	(England) Tim Sherwood	38	6	0	0	0	0	0	0	38	6
5	DF	(Scotland) Colin Hendry	38	4	0	0	0	0	0	0	38	4
6	DF	(England) Graeme Le Saux	39	3	0	0	0	0	0	0	39	3
7	MF	(England) Stuart Ripley	36+1	0	0	0	0	0	0	0	36+1	0
8	FW	(Scotland) Kevin Gallacher	1	1	0	0	0	0	0	0	1	1
9	FW	(England) Alan Shearer	42	34	0	0	0	2	0	1	42	37
10	FW	(England) Mike Newell	2+10	0	0	0	0	0	0	0	2+10	0
11	MF	(England) Jason Wilcox	27	5	0	0	0	0	0	0	27	5
12	MF	(England) Nicky Marker	0	0	0	0	0	0	0	0	0	0
13	GK	(England) Bobby Mimms	3	0	0	0	0	0	0	0	3	0
14	MF	(England) Lee Makel	0	0	0	0	0	0	0	0	0	0
15	DF	(England) Richard Brown	0	0	0	0	0	0	0	0	0	0
15	MF	(Netherlands) Richard Witschge	1	0	0	0	0	0	0	0	1	0
16	FW	(England) Chris Sutton	40	15	0	0	0	0	0	0	40	15
17	MF	(Australia) Robbie Slater	12+6	0	0	0	0	0	0	0	12+6	0
18	DF	(Scotland) Andy Morrison	0	0	0	0	0	0	0	0	0	0
19	FW	(England) Peter Thorne	0	0	0	0	0	0	0	0	0	0
20	DF	(Norway) Henning Berg	40	1	0	0	0	0	0	0	40	1
22	MF	(England) Mark Atkins	30+4	6	0	0	0	0	0	0	30+4	6
23	MF	(England) David Batty	4+1	0	0	0	0	0	0	0	4+1	0
24	MF	(England) Paul Warhurst	20+7	2	0	0	0	0	0	0	20+7	2
25	DF	(England) Ian Pearce	22+6	0	0	0	0	0	0	0	22+6	0
31	GK	(Republic of Ireland) Shay Given	0	0	0	0	0	0	0	0	0	0

Starts + substitution appearances

- Last Update: 22 January 2010
- Data does not include appearances/goals obtained whilst at another club
- Substitution appearances in (brackets)
- League – Premier League
- FA Cup – FA Cup
- League Cup – League Cup

=== Discipline ===
- As of: 14 May 1995

No.	Pos.	Name	League		FA Cup		League Cup		Total
No.	Pos.	Name	Booked	Sent off (straight red)	Booked	Sent off (straight red)	Booked	Sent off (straight red)	Booked	Sent off (straight red)
1	GK	(England) Tim Flowers	1	1	0	0	0	0	1	1
2	DF	(England) Tony Gale	1	0	0	0	0	0	1	0
3	DF	(England) Alan Wright	1	0	0	0	0	0	1	0
4	MF	(England) Tim Sherwood	10	0	0	0	0	0	10	0
5	DF	(Scotland) Colin Hendry	4	0	0	0	0	0	4	0
6	DF	(England) Graeme Le Saux	8	0	0	0	0	0	8	0
7	MF	(England) Stuart Ripley	1	0	0	0	0	0	1	0
9	FW	(England) Alan Shearer	4	0	0	0	0	0	4	0
10	FW	(England) Mike Newell	1	0	0	0	0	0	1	0
11	MF	(England) Jason Wilcox	5	2	0	0	0	0	5	2
16	FW	(England) Chris Sutton	7	0	0	0	0	0	7	0
17	MF	(Australia) Robbie Slater	3	0	0	0	0	0	3	0
20	DF	(Norway) Henning Berg	2	1	0	0	0	0	2	1
21	DF	(Republic of Ireland) Jeff Kenna	1	0	0	0	0	0	1	0
22	MF	(England) Mark Atkins	1	0	0	0	0	0	1	0
23	MF	(England) David Batty	1	0	1	0	1	0	1	0
24	MF	(England) Paul Warhurst	5	0	0	0	0	0	5	0
25	DF	(England) Ian Pearce	2	0	0	0	0	0	2	0
		TOTALS	58	4	0	0	0	0	58	4

== Transfers ==
=== In ===
Date	Player	Previous club	Cost
13 July 1994	(England) Chris Sutton	(England) Norwich City	£5 000 000
4 August 1994	(Australia) Robbie Slater	(France) RC Lens	£300 000
8 August 1994	(Republic of Ireland) Shay Given	(Scotland) Celtic	Free
11 August 1994	(England) Tony Gale	(England) West Ham	Free
28 August 1994	(England) Tony Carss	(England) Bradford City	Free
15 March 1995	(Republic of Ireland) Jeff Kenna	(England) Southampton	£1 500 000

=== Out ===
Date	Player	New Club	Cost
9 August 1994	(England) Andy Scott	(Wales) Cardiff City	Free
12 August 1994	(England) Simon Ireland	(England) Mansfield Town	£60 000
9 December 1994	(England) Andy Morrison	(England) Blackpool	Free
18 January 1995	(England) Peter Thorne	(England) Swindon Town	£225 000
13 February 1995	(England) Matt Dickins	(England) Stockport County	Free
3 March 1995	(England) Richard Brown	(England) Stockport County	Free
10 March 1995	(England) Alan Wright	(England) Aston Villa	£1 000 000

=== Loaned in ===
Date	Player	Club	Return date
1 April 1995	(Netherlands) Richard Witschge	(France) Bordeaux	31 May 1995

=== Loaned out ===
Date	Player	Club	Return date
2 September 1994	(England) Paul Harford	(England) Wigan Athletic	?
9 September 1994	(England) Matt Dickens	(England) Grimsby Town	?
14 October 1994	(England) Matt Dickens	(England) Rochdale	?
15 December 1994	(England) Paul Harford	(England) Shrewsbury Town	?
