= 1994 FA Charity Shield =

Blackburn Rovers	Manchester United
0	2
- Date: 14 August 1994
- Venue: Wembley Stadium, London
- Referee: Philip Don (Middlesex)
- Attendance: 60,402

The 1994 FA Charity Shield was the 72nd FA Charity Shield, an annual football match played between the winners of the previous season's Premier League and FA Cup competitions. The match was played on 14 August 1994 at Wembley Stadium and contested by Manchester United, who had won the league and cup Double in 1993–94, and Blackburn Rovers, who had finished as runners-up in the Premier League. Manchester United won the match 2–0 with goals from Eric Cantona and Paul Ince, with seven players booked due to a new clampdown imposed by referees.

Notable omissions from the Blackburn side were the previous season's top scorer Alan Shearer (who had a virus from eating seafood) and his new strike partner Chris Sutton, who had just joined them for a national record fee of £5 million. Also absent due to injury were Mike Newell, Kevin Gallacher, Paul Warhurst and David Batty. Stuart Ripley and Ian Pearce made a makeshift front two, with young striker Peter Thorne making his solitary appearance for Blackburn as a substitute. Other debutants for Rovers were experienced defender Tony Gale and Australian winger Robbie Slater.

Meanwhile, Manchester United defender David May made his club debut just weeks after joining them from Blackburn. Denis Irwin and Roy Keane were absent after being given an extended break after playing for the Republic of Ireland in the 1994 FIFA World Cup.

== Match details ==
14 August 1994
16:00 UTC+1

Blackburn Rovers	0–2	Manchester United
	Report	Cantona 22' (pen.); Ince 81'

Wembley Stadium, London
Attendance: 60,402
Referee: Philip Don (Middlesex)

Blackburn Rovers	Manchester United

GK	1	(England) Tim Flowers
RB	20	(Norway) Henning Berg
CB	5	(Scotland) Colin Hendry	Booked
CB	2	(England) Tony Gale
LB	6	(England) Graeme Le Saux	Booked
RM	17	(Australia) Robbie Slater
CM	22	(England) Mark Atkins		(substituted off) 64'
CM	4	(England) Tim Sherwood (c)	Booked
LM	11	(England) Jason Wilcox	Booked
CF	7	(England) Stuart Ripley
CF	25	(England) Ian Pearce
Substitutes:
GK	13	(England) Bobby Mimms
DF	3	(England) Alan Wright
DF	18	(Scotland) Andy Morrison
MF	21	(England) Paul Harford
FW	19	(England) Peter Thorne		(substituted on) 64'
Manager:
(Scotland) Kenny Dalglish

GK	1	(Denmark) Peter Schmeichel
RB	12	(England) David May
CB	4	(England) Steve Bruce (c)	Booked
CB	6	(England) Gary Pallister
LB	5	(England) Lee Sharpe	Booked
RM	14	(Russia) Andrei Kanchelskis
CM	9	(Scotland) Brian McClair
CM	8	(England) Paul Ince
LM	11	(Wales) Ryan Giggs	Booked
SS	7	(France) Eric Cantona
CF	10	(Wales) Mark Hughes
Substitutes:
GK	13	(England) Gary Walsh
DF	26	(England) Chris Casper
MF	19	(England) Nicky Butt
MF	31	(Northern Ireland) Keith Gillespie
FW	20	(England) Dion Dublin
Manager:
(Scotland) Alex Ferguson

Match officials

- Linesmen:
  - Alan Streets (Sheffield and Hallamshire)
  - Mark Warren (Staffordshire)
- Reserve official: Alan Wilkie (Durham)

Match rules

- 90 minutes
- Penalty shootout if scores level
- Five named substitutes, of which two may be used

== See also ==
- 1993–94 FA Premier League
- 1993–94 FA Cup

== Sources ==
- 1994 Final
