= 1992–93 Blackburn Rovers F.C. season =

Blackburn Rovers
1992–93 season
- Owner: Jack Walker
- Chairman: Robert Coar
- Manager: Kenny Dalglish
- Stadium: Ewood Park
- Premier League: 4th
- FA Cup: Quarter-finals
- League Cup: Semi-finals
- Top goalscorer: Shearer (16)
- Average home league attendance: 16,248
Home colours	Away colours

The 1992–93 season was Blackburn Rovers' 105th season as a professional football club. This was their first year in the Premier League, but it was their first season in the top division since 1966.

== Season summary ==
With the riches of owner Jack Walker allowing manager Kenny Dalglish to sign Southampton striker Alan Shearer for a new British record fee (variously reported as £3.3 million, £3.4 million, or £3.6 million), Blackburn enjoyed an excellent season in their return to the top flight. In spite of Shearer being restricted to only 21 league appearances and 16 league goals after he snapped his right anterior cruciate ligament in a match against Leeds in December, Blackburn finished fourth - just one point off UEFA Cup qualification. Blackburn's cup form nearly saw them qualify for Europe anyway, but they were knocked out of the FA Cup in the quarter-finals and the League Cup in the semi-finals.

== Kit ==
Japanese company Asics manufactured Blackburn's kit this season. British brewery McEwan's Lager were the kit sponsors.

== Final league table ==
Pos	Team	Pld	W	D	L	GF	GA	GD	Pts	Qualification or relegation
2	Aston Villa	42	21	11	10	57	40	+17	74	Qualification for the UEFA Cup first round (Note: Since League Cup winners Arsenal had qualified for the UEFA Cup Winners Cup by also winning the FA Cup, the UEFA Cup berth for the League Cup reverted to the league and was awarded to Norwich City. England was considered for an extra slot for the UEFA Cup after the 1993 Polish football scandal, but another one was given to Scotland, and it was thought excessive to give both two slots to Great Britain, and the extra place was awarded to Hungary.)
3	Norwich City	42	21	9	12	61	65	−4	72	Qualification for the UEFA Cup first round
4	Blackburn Rovers	42	20	11	11	68	46	+22	71	
5	Queens Park Rangers	42	17	12	13	63	55	+8	63	
6	Liverpool	42	16	11	15	62	55	+7	59	

Source: Premier League
Rules for classification: 1) points; 2) goal difference; 3) number of goals scored.

== Results ==
Blackburn Rovers' score comes first

=== Legend ===
Win	Draw	Loss

=== FA Premier League ===
Date	Opponent	Venue	Result	Attendance	Scorers
15 August 1992	Crystal Palace	A	3–3	17,086	Ripley, Shearer (2)
18 August 1992	Arsenal	H	1–0	16,454	Shearer
22 August 1992	Manchester City	H	1–0	19,433	Newell
26 August 1992	Chelsea	A	0–0	19,575	
29 August 1992	Coventry City	A	2–0	14,541	Shearer (pen), Atkins
5 September 1992	Nottingham Forest	H	4–1	16,180	Shearer (2, 1 pen), Atkins, Crossley (own goal)
12 September 1992	Arsenal	A	1–0	28,643	Newell
15 September 1992	Everton	H	2–3	19,563	Shearer (2, 1 pen)
19 September 1992	Wimbledon	A	1–1	6,117	Shearer
26 September 1992	Oldham Athletic	H	2–0	18,393	Shearer, Ripley
3 October 1992	Norwich City	H	7–1	16,312	Wegerle (2), Sherwood, Shearer (2), Cowans, Ripley
19 October 1992	Aston Villa	A	0–0	30,398	
24 October 1992	Manchester United	H	0–0	20,305	
31 October 1992	Sheffield Wednesday	A	0–0	31,044	
7 November 1992	Tottenham Hotspur	H	0–2	17,305	
22 November 1992	Southampton	A	1–1	16,626	Moran
28 November 1992	Queens Park Rangers	H	1–0	15,850	Shearer
5 December 1992	Middlesbrough	A	2–3	20,096	Wilcox, Phillips (own goal)
13 December 1992	Liverpool	A	1–2	43,668	Shearer
19 December 1992	Sheffield United	H	1–0	16,057	Moran
26 December 1992	Leeds United	H	3–1	19,910	Wilcox, Shearer (2)
28 December 1992	Ipswich Town	A	1–2	21,431	Wegerle
9 January 1993	Wimbledon	H	0–0	14,504	
16 January 1993	Oldham Athletic	A	1–0	13,742	Ripley
26 January 1993	Coventry City	H	2–5	15,215	Newell, Hendry
30 January 1993	Manchester City	A	2–3	29,122	Newell, Phelan (own goal)
2 February 1993	Crystal Palace	H	1–2	14,163	Wegerle
21 February 1993	Chelsea	H	2–0	14,780	Newell (2)
28 February 1993	Norwich City	A	0–0	15,821	
3 March 1993	Everton	A	1–2	18,086	May
9 March 1993	Southampton	H	0–0	13,556	
20 March 1993	Middlesbrough	H	1–1	14,041	Atkins
24 March 1993	Queens Park Rangers	A	3–0	10,677	Ripley, Moran, Atkins
3 April 1993	Liverpool	H	4–1	15,032	Newell, Moran, Gallacher, Wilcox
7 April 1993	Nottingham Forest	A	3–1	20,467	Wilcox, Ripley, Newell
10 April 1993	Leeds United	A	2–5	31,791	Gallacher, Atkins
12 April 1993	Ipswich Town	H	2–1	14,071	Ripley, Whelan (own goal)
17 April 1993	Sheffield United	A	3–1	18,186	Gallacher, Newell, Sherwood
21 April 1993	Aston Villa	H	3–0	15,127	Newell (2), Gallacher
3 May 1993	Manchester United	A	1–3	40,447	Gallacher
5 May 1993	Tottenham Hotspur	A	2–1	23,097	Newell (2)
8 May 1993	Sheffield Wednesday	H	1–0	14,956	Sherwood

=== FA Cup ===
Round	Date	Opponent	Venue	Result	Attendance	Goalscorers
R3	2 January 1993	Bournemouth	H	3–1	13,733	Ripley (2), Newell
R4	23 January 1993	Crewe Alexandra	A	3–0	7,054	Wegerle, Newell, Moran
R5	13 February 1993	Newcastle United	H	1–0	19,972	Wegerle
QF	6 March 1993	Sheffield United	H	0–0	6,721 (2,543)	
QFR	16 March 1993	Sheffield United	A	2–2 (lost 3–5 on pens)	23,920 (400)	Newell, Livingstone

=== League Cup ===
Round	Date	Opponent	Venue	Result	Attendance	Goalscorers
R2 First Leg	23 September 1992	Huddersfield Town	A	1–1	11,071	Shearer
R2 Second Leg	6 October 1992	Huddersfield Town	H	4–3 (won 5–4 on agg)	15,038	Shearer (2), Wegerle, Newell
R3	28 October 1992	Norwich City	H	2–0	14,216	Shearer, May
R4	9 December 1992	Watford	H	6–1	13,187	Shearer (2), Atkins, Newell (2), Wegerle
QF	6 January 1993	Cambridge United	H	3–2	14,165	Newell (2), Wegerle
SF First Leg	10 February 1993	Sheffield Wednesday	H	2–4	17,283	Wegerle 10', Palmer (own goal) 32'
SF Second Leg	14 March 1993	Sheffield Wednesday	A	1–2 (lost 3–6 on agg)	30,048	Andersson 34'

== First-team squad ==
Note: Flags indicate national team as defined under FIFA eligibility rules; some limited exceptions apply. Players may hold more than one non-FIFA nationality.

Pos.	Nation	Player
GK	ENG	Darren Collier
GK	ENG	Matt Dickins
GK	ENG	Bobby Mimms
GK	AUS	Frank Talia
DF	SWE	Patrik Andersson
DF	NOR	Henning Berg
DF	ENG	Richard Brown
DF	ENG	Rob Dewhurst
DF	ENG	Tony Dobson
DF	SCO	Colin Hendry
DF	ENG	Graeme Le Saux
DF	ENG	Nicky Marker
DF	ENG	David May
DF	IRL	Kevin Moran (captain)
DF	ENG	Chris Price
DF	ENG	Alan Wright

Pos.	Nation	Player
MF	ENG	Steve Agnew
MF	ENG	Mark Atkins
MF	ENG	Wayne Burnett
MF	ENG	Gordon Cowans
MF	ENG	Simon Ireland
MF	ENG	Lee Makel
MF	ENG	Stuart Ripley
MF	ENG	Tim Sherwood
MF	ENG	Jason Wilcox
FW	ENG	Mike Newell
FW	ENG	Alan Shearer
FW	SCO	Kevin Gallacher
FW	ENG	Peter Thorne

=== Left club during season ===
Note: Flags indicate national team as defined under FIFA eligibility rules; some limited exceptions apply. Players may hold more than one non-FIFA nationality.

Pos.	Nation	Player
DF	ENG	Keith Hill (to Plymouth Argyle)
MF	ENG	Craig Skinner (to Plymouth Argyle)

Pos.	Nation	Player
FW	ENG	Steve Livingstone (to Chelsea)
FW	USA	Roy Wegerle (to Coventry)

== Transfers ==
=== In ===
- (Scotland) Kevin Gallacher - (England) Coventry City, March, £1,500,000
- (Australia) Frank Talia - (Australia) Sunshine George Cross, August
- (Sweden) Patrik Andersson - (Sweden) Malmö, December, £800,000
- (England) Stuart Ripley - (England) Middlesbrough, £1,300,000
- (England) Graeme Le Saux - (England) Chelsea, March, £700,000
- (England) Nicky Marker - (England) Plymouth Argyle, £200,000 plus Keith Hill and Craig Skinner
- (Norway) Henning Berg - Lillestrøm, £400,000
- (England) Lee Makel - (England) Newcastle United, £160,000
- (England) Alan Shearer - (England) Southampton, £3,400,000 plus David Speedie

=== Out ===
- (England) Lee Richardson - (Scotland) Aberdeen
- (England) Steve Livingstone - (England) Chelsea, March, £350,000
- (United States) Roy Wegerle - (England) Coventry, March, £1,000,000
- (England) Keith Hill - (England) Plymouth Argyle, part-exchange
- (England) Craig Skinner - (England) Plymouth Argyle, part-exchange
- (Scotland) David Speedie - (England) Southampton, part-exchange
