= 1995–96 Blackburn Rovers F.C. season =

Blackburn Rovers F.C.
1995–96 season
- Owner: Jack Walker
- Chairman: Robert Coar
- Manager: Ray Harford
- Stadium: Ewood Park
- FA Premier League: 7th
- FA Cup: Third round
- League Cup: Fourth round
- FA Charity Shield: Runners-up
- UEFA Champions League: Group stage
- Top goalscorer: League: Shearer (31); All: Shearer (37)
- Average home league attendance: 27,714
Home colours	Away colours	Third colours

During the 1995–96 English football season, Blackburn Rovers F.C. competed in the FA Premier League.

== Season summary ==
Blackburn had a disappointing title defence in the FA Premier League, dropping to 7th in the standings in the wake of Kenny Dalglish's resignation as manager. Their first half of the season was little short of disastrous, their 5–0 defeat at struggling Coventry City in mid December being their eighth in the league, with relegation a distinct possibility. However, Blackburn improved in the second half of the season, losing just five more games and only narrowly missing out on a UEFA Cup place.

They also got knocked out of the Champions League already in the group stage against comparatively unknown Rosenborg and Legia Warsaw. Compounding the misery was the sale of fan favourite and top scorer Alan Shearer, who went to Newcastle for a British transfer record at the end of July.

== Final league table ==
Pos	Team	Pld	W	D	L	GF	GA	GD	Pts	Qualification or relegation
5	Arsenal	38	17	12	9	49	32	+17	63	Qualification for the UEFA Cup first round
6	Everton	38	17	10	11	64	44	+20	61	Excluded from the UEFA Cup (Note: The Football Association was initially awarded a UEFA Fair Play berth to the Premier League's highest-placed team not qualified for Europe, but was revoked by UEFA for its clubs fielding under-strength sides in the 1995 UEFA Intertoto Cup.)
7	Blackburn Rovers	38	18	7	13	61	47	+14	61	
8	Tottenham Hotspur	38	16	13	9	50	38	+12	61	
9	Nottingham Forest	38	15	13	10	50	54	−4	58	

Source: Premier League
Rules for classification: 1) points; 2) goal difference; 3) number of goals scored.
Notes:

Results summary

Overall								Home						Away					
Pld	W	D	L	GF	GA	GD	Pts	W	D	L	GF	GA	GD	W	D	L	GF	GA	GD
38	18	7	13	61	47	+14	61	14	2	3	44	19	+25	4	5	10	17	28	−11

Source: Statto

Results by round

Round	1	2	3	4	5	6	7	8	9	10	11	12	13	14	15	16	17	18	19	20	21	22	23	24	25	26	27	28	29	30	31	32	33	34	35	36	37	38
Ground	H	A	A	H	H	A	H	A	H	A	H	A	A	H	A	H	A	H	A	H	H	A	A	H	H	A	H	A	A	H	A	H	A	H	A	H	H	A
Result	W	L	L	L	D	L	W	L	W	D	W	L	L	W	D	W	L	W	D	W	W	D	W	W	W	L	L	L	D	W	W	L	L	W	W	W	D	W
Position	6	7	13	13	14	17	13	15	11	11	11	11	11	10	13	10	11	11	10	9	9	10	8	5	6	6	9	9	10	8	6	8	9	9	8	6	7	7

Source: Statto.com
A = Away; H = Home; W = Win; D = Draw; L = Loss

== Results ==
Blackburn Rovers' score comes first

=== Legend ===
Win	Draw	Loss

=== FA Premier League ===
Date	Opponent	Venue	Result	Attendance	Scorers
19 August 1995	Queens Park Rangers	H	1–0	22,860	Shearer (pen)
23 August 1995	Sheffield Wednesday	A	1–2	25,544	Shearer
26 August 1995	Bolton Wanderers	A	1–2	20,253	Holmes
28 August 1995	Manchester United	H	1–2	29,843	Shearer
9 September 1995	Aston Villa	H	1–1	27,084	Shearer
16 September 1995	Liverpool	A	0–3	39,502	
23 September 1995	Coventry City	H	5–1	24,382	Shearer (3), Hendry, Pearce
30 September 1995	Middlesbrough	A	0–2	29,462	
14 October 1995	Southampton	H	2–1	26,780	Bohinen, Shearer
21 October 1995	West Ham United	A	1–1	21,776	Shearer
28 October 1995	Chelsea	H	3–0	27,733	Sherwood, Shearer, Newell
5 November 1995	Everton	A	0–1	30,097	
8 November 1995	Newcastle United	A	0–1	36,473	
18 November 1995	Nottingham Forest	H	7–0	27,660	Shearer (3), Bohinen (2), Newell, Le Saux
26 November 1995	Arsenal	A	0–0	37,695	
2 December 1995	West Ham United	H	4–2	26,638	Shearer (3, 1 pen), Newell
9 December 1995	Coventry City	A	0–5	29,469	
16 December 1995	Middlesbrough	H	1–0	27,996	Shearer
23 December 1995	Wimbledon	A	1–1	7,105	Kimble (own goal)
26 December 1995	Manchester City	H	2–0	28,915	Shearer, Batty
30 December 1995	Tottenham Hotspur	H	2–1	30,004	Marker, Shearer
1 January 1996	Leeds United	A	0–0	31,285	
13 January 1996	Queens Park Rangers	A	1–0	13,957	Shearer
20 January 1996	Sheffield Wednesday	H	3–0	24,732	Shearer, Bohinen, Gallacher
3 February 1996	Bolton Wanderers	H	3–1	30,419	Shearer (3)
10 February 1996	Manchester United	A	0–1	42,681	
24 February 1996	Liverpool	H	2–3	30,895	Wilcox, Sherwood
28 February 1996	Aston Villa	A	0–2	28,008	
2 March 1996	Manchester City	A	1–1	29,078	Shearer
13 March 1996	Leeds United	H	1–0	23,358	Fenton
16 March 1996	Tottenham Hotspur	A	3–2	32,387	Shearer (3, 1 pen)
30 March 1996	Everton	H	0–3	29,468	
6 April 1996	Southampton	A	0–1	14,793	
8 April 1996	Newcastle United	H	2–1	30,717	Fenton (2)
13 April 1996	Nottingham Forest	A	5–1	25,273	Shearer, McKinlay, Wilcox (2), Fenton
17 April 1996	Wimbledon	H	3–2	24,174	Shearer (2), Fenton
27 April 1996	Arsenal	H	1–1	29,834	Gallacher
5 May 1996	Chelsea	A	3–2	28,436	Sherwood, McKinlay, Fenton

=== FA Charity Shield ===
Date	Opponent	Venue	Result	Attendance	Scorers
13 August 1995	Everton	N	0–1	40,149	

=== FA Cup ===
Round	Date	Opponent	Venue	Result	Attendance	Goalscorers
R3	6 January 1996	Ipswich Town	A	0–0	21,236	
R3R	16 January 1996	Ipswich Town	H	0–1	19,606	

=== League Cup ===
Round	Date	Opponent	Venue	Result	Attendance	Goalscorers
R2 1st Leg	20 September 1995	Swindon Town	A	3–2	14,740	Sutton, Shearer (2)
R2 2nd Leg	4 October 1995	Swindon Town	H	2–0	16,924	Shearer (2)
R3	24 October 1995	Watford	A	2–1	17,035	Shearer, Newell
R4	29 November 1995	Leeds United	A	1–2	26,006	Kelly (own goal)

=== UEFA Champions League ===
Round	Date	Opponent	Venue	Result	Attendance	Goalscorers	Referee
Group B	13 September 1995	Spartak Moscow	H	0–1	20,940		Michel Piraux (Belgium)
Group B	27 September 1995	Rosenborg	A	1–2	12,210	Newell	Günter Benkö (Austria)
Group B	18 October 1995	Legia Warsaw	A	0–1	15,000		Anders Frisk (Sweden)
Group B	1 November 1995	Legia Warsaw	H	0–0	20,897		Urs Meier (Switzerland)
Group B	22 November 1995	Spartak Moscow	A	0–3	25,000		Pierluigi Pairetto (Italy)
Group B	6 December 1995	Rosenborg	H	4–1	20,677	Shearer (pen), Newell (3)	Didier Pauchard (France)

== Squad ==
Note: Flags indicate national team as defined under FIFA eligibility rules; some limited exceptions apply. Players may hold more than one non-FIFA nationality.

No.	Pos.	Nation	Player
1	GK	ENG	Tim Flowers
2	DF	WAL	Chris Coleman
3	DF	IRL	Jeff Kenna
4	MF	ENG	Tim Sherwood
5	DF	SCO	Colin Hendry
6	DF	ENG	Graeme Le Saux
7	MF	ENG	Stuart Ripley
8	FW	SCO	Kevin Gallacher
9	FW	ENG	Alan Shearer
10	FW	ENG	Mike Newell
11	MF	ENG	Jason Wilcox
12	DF	ENG	Nicky Marker
13	GK	ENG	Bobby Mimms
14	FW	ENG	Graham Fenton
15	MF	ENG	Matty Holmes
16	FW	ENG	Chris Sutton

No.	Pos.	Nation	Player
17	MF	SCO	Billy McKinlay
18	MF	SWE	Niklas Gudmundsson
19	DF	ENG	Adam Reed
20	DF	NOR	Henning Berg
21	MF	ENG	Paul Harford
22	MF	NOR	Lars Bohinen
23	MF	ENG	Garry Flitcroft
24	DF	ENG	Paul Warhurst
25	DF	ENG	Ian Pearce
26	DF	IRL	Gary Tallon
27	DF	ENG	Tony Whealing
28	MF	ENG	Wayne Gill
29	DF	ENG	Steve Hitchen
30	DF	ENG	Marlon Broomes
31	GK	IRL	Shay Given
34	DF	ENG	Gary Croft

=== Left club during season ===
Note: Flags indicate national team as defined under FIFA eligibility rules; some limited exceptions apply. Players may hold more than one non-FIFA nationality.

No.	Pos.	Nation	Player
22	MF	ENG	Mark Atkins (to Wolverhampton Wanderers)
14	MF	ENG	Lee Makel (to Huddersfield Town)

No.	Pos.	Nation	Player
23	MF	ENG	David Batty (to Newcastle United)

=== Reserve squad ===
Note: Flags indicate national team as defined under FIFA eligibility rules; some limited exceptions apply. Players may hold more than one non-FIFA nationality.

No.	Pos.	Nation	Player
—	GK	AUS	Frank Talia
—	DF	IRL	Graham Coughlan
—	DF	ENG	Richard Hope
—	DF	IRL	David Worrell

No.	Pos.	Nation	Player
—	MF	IRL	Damien Duff
—	FW	ENG	James Beattie
—	FW	ENG	Michael Holt

== Transfers ==
=== In ===
Date	Pos	Name	From	Fee
9 August 1995	DF	Adam Reed	Darlington	£200,000
15 August 1995	MF	Matty Holmes	West Ham United	£1,200,000
1 October 1995	MF	Lars Bohinen	Nottingham Forest	£700,000
10 October 1995	MF	Billy McKinlay	Dundee United	£1,750,000
14 October 1995	DF	Graham Coughlan	Bray Wanderers	£100,000
6 November 1995	ST	Graham Fenton	Aston Villa	£1,500,000
21 December 1995	DF	Chris Coleman	Crystal Palace	£2,800,000
1 March 1996	MF	Niklas Gudmundsson	Halmstads BK	£750,000
28 March 1996	MF	Garry Flitcroft	Manchester City	£3,500,000
29 March 1996	DF	Gary Croft	Grimsby Town	£1,600,000

=== Out ===
Date	Pos	Name	To	Fee
11 August 1995	MF	Tony Carss	Darlington	Free transfer
14 August 1995	MF	Robbie Slater	West Ham United	£600,000
10 September 1995	MF	Mark Atkins	Wolverhampton Wanderers	£1,000,000
13 October 1995	MF	Lee Makel	Huddersfield Town	£300,000
9 November 1995	GK	Frank Talia	Swindon Town	£150,000
24 February 1996	MF	David Batty	Newcastle United	£3,750,000

Transfers in: ▼£5,750,000
Transfers out: ▲£1,050,000
Total spending: ▼£4,700,000

== Statistics ==
=== Appearances and goals ===
No.	Pos	Nat	Player	Total		FA Premier League		FA Cup		League Cup		UEFA Champions League	
No.	Pos	Nat	Player	Apps	Goals	Apps	Goals	Apps	Goals	Apps	Goals	Apps	Goals
Goalkeepers
1	GK	(England) ENG	Tim Flowers	48	0	37	0	2	0	3	0	6	0
13	GK	(England) ENG	Bobby Mimms	2	0	1+1	0	0	0	0	0	0	0
Defenders
2	DF	(Wales) WAL	Chris Coleman	22	0	19+1	0	2	0	0	0	0	0
3	DF	(Republic of Ireland) IRL	Jeff Kenna	43	0	32	0	2	0	4	0	5	0
5	DF	(Scotland) SCO	Colin Hendry	44	1	33	1	2	0	4	0	5	0
6	DF	(England) ENG	Graeme Le Saux	19	1	13+1	1	0	0	2	0	2+1	0
12	DF	(England) ENG	Nicky Marker	10	1	8+1	1	0	0	0	0	1	0
20	DF	(Norway) NOR	Henning Berg	50	0	38	0	2	0	4	0	6	0
24	DF	(England) ENG	Paul Warhurst	18	0	1+9	0	0	0	1+2	0	4+1	0
25	DF	(England) ENG	Ian Pearce	19	1	12	1	0	0	3	0	4	0
Midfielders
4	MF	(England) ENG	Tim Sherwood	46	3	34	3	1+1	0	4	0	6	0
7	MF	(England) ENG	Stuart Ripley	38	0	28	0	2	0	3	0	4+1	0
11	MF	(England) ENG	Jason Wilcox	10	3	10	3	0	0	0	0	0	0
15	MF	(England) ENG	Matty Holmes	12	1	8+1	1	0	0	0	0	2+1	0
17	MF	(Scotland) SCO	Billy McKinlay	22	2	13+6	2	1+1	0	1	0	0	0
22	MF	(Norway) NOR	Lars Bohinen	20	4	17+2	4	1	0	0	0	0	0
23	MF	(England) ENG	Garry Flitcroft	3	0	3	0	0	0	0	0	0	0
Forwards
8	FW	(Scotland) SCO	Kevin Gallacher	19	2	14+2	2	2	0	0	0	0+1	0
9	FW	(England) ENG	Alan Shearer	47	37	35	31	2	0	4	5	6	1
10	FW	(England) ENG	Mike Newell	42	8	26+4	3	2	0	4	1	5+1	4
14	FW	(England) ENG	Graham Fenton	14	6	4+10	6	0	0	0	0	0	0
16	FW	(England) ENG	Chris Sutton	22	1	9+4	0	0	0	2+1	1	3+3	0
18	FW	(Sweden) SWE	Niklas Gudmundsson	4	0	1+3	0	0	0	0	0	0	0
Players transferred out during the season
14	MF	(England) ENG	Lee Makel	5	0	0+3	0	0	0	0	0	1+1	0
22	MF	(England) ENG	Mark Atkins	5	0	0+4	0	0	0	0	0	1	0
23	MF	(England) ENG	David Batty	33	1	23	1	1	0	4	0	5	0

Last updated: 30 May 1996
Source: Competitions
