= 2000–01 Leeds United A.F.C. season =

2000–01 season of Leeds United

Leeds United
2000–01 season
- Chairman: Peter Ridsdale
- Manager: David O'Leary
- Stadium: Elland Road
- Premier League: 4th
- FA Cup: Fourth round
- League Cup: Third round
- Champions League: Semi-finals
- Top goalscorer: League: Mark Viduka (17); All: Mark Viduka (22)
- Highest home attendance: 40,055 vs Liverpool (4 November 2000, Premier League)
- Lowest home attendance: 32,386 vs Barnsley (6 January 2001, FA Cup)
- Average home league attendance: 37,866

The 2000–01 season saw Leeds United competing in the Premier League (known as the FA Carling Premiership for sponsorship reasons) and the UEFA Champions League.

== Competitions ==
=== Premier League ===
==== League table ====
Pos	Team	Pld	W	D	L	GF	GA	GD	Pts	Qualification or relegation
2	Arsenal	38	20	10	8	63	38	+25	70	Qualification for the Champions League first group stage
3	Liverpool	38	20	9	9	71	39	+32	69	Qualification for the Champions League third qualifying round (Note: Since Liverpool won the League Cup and qualified for the Champions League, their UEFA Cup place went to fifth-placed Ipswich Town. Since both FA Cup finalists, Liverpool and Arsenal, qualified for the Champions League, the berth in the UEFA Cup went to sixth-placed Chelsea. Both Ipswich and Chelsea were the highest-ranked team not already qualified for a European competition.)
4	Leeds United	38	20	8	10	64	43	+21	68	Qualification for the UEFA Cup first round
5	Ipswich Town	38	20	6	12	57	42	+15	66	Qualification for the UEFA Cup first round
6	Chelsea	38	17	10	11	68	45	+23	61	Qualification for the UEFA Cup first round

Source: Premier League
Rules for classification: 1) points; 2) goal difference; 3) number of goals scored.

==== Results summary ====
Overall								Home						Away					
Pld	W	D	L	GF	GA	GD	Pts	W	D	L	GF	GA	GD	W	D	L	GF	GA	GD
38	20	8	10	64	43	+21	68	11	3	5	36	21	+15	9	5	5	28	22	+6

Source: 2000-01 FA Premier League table

==== Results by round ====
Round	1	2	3	4	5	6	7	8	9	10	11	12	13	14	15	16	17	18	19	20	21	22	23	24	25	26	27	28	29	30	31	32	33	34	35	36	37	38
Ground	H	A	H	A	H	A	H	H	A	A	H	A	H	H	A	A	H	H	A	H	A	H	A	H	A	A	H	A	H	A	A	H	A	A	H	A	H	H
Result	W	W	L	D	L	D	W	W	L	D	W	D	L	W	L	L	W	L	L	D	W	L	W	W	W	D	D	W	D	W	W	W	W	W	W	L	W	W
Position	5	2	4	6	9	10	8	4	9	10	7	8	10	10	11	12	10	12	12	13	12	12	10	10	7	6	5	6	5	5	3	3	3	4	3	4	4	4

Source: Statto.com
A = Away; H = Home; W = Win; D = Draw; L = Loss

==== Matches ====
19 August 2000 1	Leeds United	2–0	Everton	Leeds
	Smith 16', 37'	Report		Stadium: Elland Road; Attendance: 40,010; Referee: Dermot Gallagher

26 August 2000 2	Middlesbrough	1–2	Leeds United	Middlesbrough
	Stamp 82'	Report	Bowyer 6'; Smith 12'	Stadium: Riverside Stadium; Attendance: 31,626; Referee: Graham Barber

5 September 2000 3	Leeds United	1–2	Manchester City	Leeds
	Bowyer 56'	Report	Howey 34'; Wiekens 40'	Stadium: Elland Road; Attendance: 40,055; Referee: Graham Poll

9 September 2000 4	Coventry City	0–0	Leeds United	Coventry
		Report		Stadium: Highfield Road; Attendance: 20,377; Referee: Paul Durkin

16 September 2000 5	Leeds United	1–2	Ipswich Town	Leeds
	Bowyer 4'	Report	Scowcroft 15'; Wright 47'	Stadium: Elland Road; Attendance: 35,552; Referee: Mark Halsey

23 September 2000 6	Derby County	1–1	Leeds United	Derby
	Kinkladze 75'	Report	Harte 34'	Stadium: Pride Park Stadium; Attendance: 26,248; Referee: Barry Knight

30 September 2000 7	Leeds United	4–3	Tottenham Hotspur	Leeds
	Viduka 52', 55'; Smith 59', 64'	Report	Rebrov 37', 74'; Perry 60'	Stadium: Elland Road; Attendance: 37,562; Referee: Neale Barry

14 October 2000 8	Leeds United	3–1	Charlton Athletic	Leeds
	Smith 38'; Viduka 73', 90'	Report	Jensen 84'	Stadium: Elland Road; Attendance: 38,837; Referee: Mike Dean

21 October 2000 9	Manchester United	3–0	Leeds United	Manchester
	Yorke 40'; Beckham 50'; Jones 82' (o.g.)	Report		Stadium: Old Trafford; Attendance: 67,525; Referee: Jeff Winter

29 October 2000 10	Bradford City	1–1	Leeds United	Bradford
	Collymore 20'	Report	Viduka 79'	Stadium: Valley Parade; Attendance: 17,364; Referee: Steve Lodge

4 November 2000 11	Leeds United	4–3	Liverpool	Leeds
	Viduka 24', 46', 73', 75'	Report	Hyypiä 2'; Ziege 18'; Šmicer 61'	Stadium: Elland Road; Attendance: 40,055; Referee: David Elleray

12 November 2000 12	Chelsea	1–1	Leeds United	Fulham
	Poyet 78'	Report	Viduka 62'	Stadium: Stamford Bridge; Attendance: 35,121; Referee: Graham Poll

18 November 2000 13	Leeds United	0–1	West Ham United	Leeds
			Winterburn 45'	Stadium: Elland Road; Attendance: 40,005; Referee: Paul Taylor

26 November 2000 14	Leeds United	1–0	Arsenal	Leeds
	Dacourt 56'	Report		Stadium: Elland Road; Attendance: 38,084; Referee: Dermot Gallagher

2 December 2000 15	Leicester City	3–1	Leeds United	Leicester
	Savage 7'; Akinbiyi 17'; Taggart 28'	Report	Viduka 75'	Stadium: Filbert Street; Attendance: 21,486; Referee: Steve Bennett

9 December 2000 16	Southampton	1–0	Leeds United	Southampton
	Beattie 43'			Stadium: The Dell; Attendance: 15,225; Referee: Paul Durkin

16 December 2000 17	Leeds United	2–0	Sunderland	Leeds
	Bowyer 23'; Viduka 78'	Report		Stadium: Elland Road; Attendance: 40,053; Referee: Rob Styles

23 December 2000 18	Leeds United	1–2	Aston Villa	Leeds
	Woodgate 90'	Report	Southgate 43'; Boateng 88'	Stadium: Elland Road; Attendance: 39,714; Referee: Mark Halsey

26 December 2000 19	Newcastle United	2–1	Leeds United	Newcastle
	Solano 41'; Acuña 44'	Report	Dacourt 10'	Stadium: St. James' Park; Attendance: 52,118; Referee: Andy D'Urso

1 January 2001 20	Leeds United	1–1	Middlesbrough	Leeds
	Keane 55' (pen.)	Report	Bokšić 27'	Stadium: Elland Road; Attendance: 39,251; Referee: David Elleray

13 January 2001 21	Manchester City	0–4	Leeds United	Manchester
		Report	Bakke 34'; Bowyer 80'; Keane 90', 90'	Stadium: Maine Road; Attendance: 34,288; Referee: Mike Dean

20 January 2001 22	Leeds United	1–3	Newcastle United	Leeds
	Keane 2'	Report	Solano 4' (pen.); Acuña 44'; Ameobi 86'	Stadium: Elland Road; Attendance: 40,005; Referee: Alan Wiley

24 January 2001 23	Aston Villa	1–2	Leeds United	Birmingham
	Merson 24'	Report	Bowyer 28'; Harte 75' (pen.)	Stadium: Villa Park; Attendance: 29,335; Referee: Steve Bennett

31 January 2001 24	Leeds United	1–0	Coventry City	Leeds
	Keane 69'	Report		Stadium: Elland Road; Attendance: 36,555; Referee: Rob Harris

3 February 2001 25	Ipswich Town	1–2	Leeds United	Ipswich
	Venus 63'	Report	Venus 28' (o.g.); Keane 41'	Stadium: Portman Road; Attendance: 22,015; Referee: Peter Jones

7 February 2001 26	Everton	2–2	Leeds United	Liverpool
	Ferguson 22'; Campbell 74'	Report	Harte 66'; Dacourt 76'	Stadium: Goodison Park; Attendance: 34,224; Referee: Neale Barry

10 February 2001 27	Leeds United	0–0	Derby County	Leeds
				Stadium: Elland Road; Attendance: 38,789; Referee: Jeff Winter

24 February 2001 28	Tottenham Hotspur	1–2	Leeds United	Tottenham
	Ferdinand 33'	Report	Harte 45' (pen.); Bowyer 57'	Stadium: White Hart Lane; Attendance: 36,070; Referee: Jeff Winter

3 March 2001 29	Leeds United	1–1	Manchester United	Leeds
	Viduka 84'	Report	Chadwick 64'	Stadium: Elland Road; Attendance: 40,055; Referee: Graham Barber

17 March 2001 30	Charlton Athletic	1–2	Leeds United	Charlton
	Bartlett 18'	Report	Viduka 1'; Smith 46'	Stadium: The Valley; Attendance: 20,043; Referee: Clive Wilkes

31 March 2001 31	Sunderland	0–2	Leeds United	Sunderland
		Report	Smith 33'; Viduka 90'	Stadium: Stadium of Light; Attendance: 48,285; Referee: Steve Dunn

7 April 2001 32	Leeds United	2–0	Southampton	Leeds
	Kewell 10'; Keane 72'	Report		Stadium: Elland Road; Attendance: 39,267; Referee: Jeff Winter

13 April 2001 33	Liverpool	1–2	Leeds United	Liverpool
	Gerrard 54'	Report	Ferdinand 4'; Bowyer 33'	Stadium: Anfield; Attendance: 44,116; Referee: Alan Wiley

21 April 2001 34	West Ham United	0–2	Leeds United	Newham
		Report	Keane 8'; Ferdinand 48'	Stadium: Boleyn Ground; Attendance: 26,041; Referee: Graham Poll

28 April 2001 35	Leeds United	2–0	Chelsea	Leeds
	Keane 85'; Viduka 88'	Report		Stadium: Elland Road; Attendance: 39,253; Referee: Steve Dunn

5 May 2001 36	Arsenal	2–1	Leeds United	Islington
	Ljungberg 17'; Wiltord 56'	Report	Harte 58'	Stadium: Highbury; Attendance: 38,142; Referee: Peter Jones

13 May 2001 37	Leeds United	6–1	Bradford City	Leeds
	Viduka 14'; Harte 19'; Bakke 26'; Smith 37'; Kewell 42'; Bowyer 80'	Report	Ward 22'	Stadium: Elland Road; Attendance: 38,300; Referee: Andy D'Urso

19 May 2001 38	Leeds United	3–1	Leicester City	Leeds
	Smith 27', 90'; Harte 77'	Report	Ferdinand 32' (o.g.)	Stadium: Elland Road; Attendance: 39,105; Referee: David Elleray

=== FA Cup ===
6 January 2001 3	Leeds United	1–0	Barnsley	Leeds
	Viduka 9'	Report		Stadium: Elland Road; Attendance: 32,386; Referee: Graham Poll

27 January 2001 4	Leeds United	0–2	Liverpool	Leeds
		Report	Barmby 88'; Heskey 90'	Stadium: Elland Road; Attendance: 37,108; Referee: Andy D'Urso

=== League Cup ===
31 October 2000 3	Tranmere Rovers	3–2 (a.e.t.)	Leeds United	Liverpool
	Parkinson 52', 120'; Yates 76'	Report	Huckerby 25', 34'	Stadium: Prenton Park; Attendance: 11,681; Referee: Rob Styles

=== UEFA Champions League ===
==== Qualifying ====
9 August 2000	Leeds United	2–1	1860 Munich	Leeds
	Smith 39'; Harte 71'	Report	Agostino 90'	Stadium: Elland Road; Attendance: 33,769; Referee: Costas Kapitanis (Cyprus)

23 August 2000	1860 Munich	0–1	Leeds United	Munich
		Report	Smith 46'	Stadium: Olympiastadion; Attendance: 45,000; Referee: Claus Bo Larsen (Denmark)

==== First group stage ====
13 September 2000	Barcelona	4–0	Leeds United	Barcelona
	Rivaldo 8' de Boer 20'; Kluivert 74', 84'	Report		Stadium: Camp Nou; Attendance: 85,000; Referee: Markus Merk (Germany)

19 September 2000	Leeds United	1–0	AC Milan	Leeds
	Bowyer 89'	Report		Stadium: Elland Road; Attendance: 35,398; Referee: Günter Benkö (Austria)

26 September 2000	Leeds United	6–0	Beşiktaş	Leeds
	Bowyer 7', 90'; Viduka 12'; Matteo 22'; Bakke 65'; Huckerby 90'	Report		Stadium: Elland Road; Attendance: 34,485; Referee: Vítor Melo Pereira (Portugal)

18 October 2000	Beşiktaş	0–0	Leeds United	Istanbul
		Report		Stadium: BJK İnönü Stadium; Attendance: 16,021; Referee: Jan Wegereef (Netherlands)

24 October 2000	Leeds United	1–1	Barcelona	Leeds
	Bowyer 5'	Report	Rivaldo 90'	Stadium: Elland Road; Attendance: 36,721; Referee: Terje Hauge (Norway)

8 November 2000	AC Milan	1–1	Leeds United	Milan
	Serginho 68'	Report	Matteo 45'	Stadium: San Siro; Attendance: 52,289; Referee: Kim Milton Nielsen (Denmark)

==== Second group stage ====
22 November 2000	Leeds United	0–2	Real Madrid	Leeds
		Report	Hierro 66'; Raúl 68'	Stadium: Elland Road; Attendance: 36,794; Referee: Dick Jol (Netherlands)

5 December 2000	Lazio	0–1	Leeds United	Rome
		Report	Smith 80'	Stadium: Stadio Olimpico; Attendance: 42,450; Referee: Claude Colombo (France)

13 February 2001	Leeds United	2–1	Anderlecht	Leeds
	Harte 74'; Bowyer 87'	Report	Stoica 65'	Stadium: Elland Road; Attendance: 36,064; Referee: Karl-Erik Nilsson (Sweden)

21 February 2001	Anderlecht	1–4	Leeds United	Brussels
	Koller 76'	Report	Smith 13', 38'; Viduka 34'; Harte 81' (pen.)	Stadium: Constant Vanden Stock Stadium; Attendance: 28,000; Referee: Rune Pedersen (Norway)

6 March 2001	Real Madrid	3–2	Leeds United	Madrid
	Raúl 7', 61'; Figo 41'	Report	Smith 6'; Viduka 54'	Stadium: Santiago Bernabéu Stadium; Attendance: 40,000; Referee: Ryszard Wójcik (Poland)

14 March 2001	Leeds United	3–3	Lazio	Leeds
	Bowyer 28'; Wilcox 43'; Viduka 63'	Report	Ravanelli 21'; Mihajlović 29' (pen.), 90'	Stadium: Elland Road; Attendance: 36,741; Referee: Konrad Plautz (Austria)

==== Quarter-finals ====
4 April 2001	Leeds United	3–0	Deportivo La Coruña	Leeds
20:45	Harte 26'; Smith 51'; Ferdinand 66'	Report		Stadium: Elland Road; Attendance: 35,508; Referee: Gilles Veissière (France)

17 April 2001	Deportivo La Coruña	2–0	Leeds United	A Coruña
20:45	Djalminha 9' (pen.); Tristán 73'	Report		Stadium: Riazor; Attendance: 35,600; Referee: Stefano Braschi (Italy)

==== Semi-finals ====
2 May 2001	Leeds United	0–0	Valencia	Leeds
20:45		Report		Stadium: Elland Road; Attendance: 36,437; Referee: Pierluigi Collina (Italy)

8 May 2001	Valencia	3–0	Leeds United	Valencia
20:45	Sánchez 15', 47'; Mendieta 52'	Report		Stadium: Mestalla; Attendance: 53,000; Referee: Urs Meier (Switzerland)

== Statistics ==
No.	Pos.	Name	League		FA Cup		League Cup		Champions League		Total		Discipline	
No.	Pos.	Name	Apps	Goals	Apps	Goals	Apps	Goals	Apps	Goals	Apps	Goals	Yellow card	Red card
1	GK	(England) Nigel Martyn	23	0	1	0	0	0	12	0	36	0	1	0
2	DF	(Republic of Ireland) Gary Kelly	22+2	0	1	0	1	0	11+1	0	35+3	0	1	0
3	DF	(Republic of Ireland) Ian Harte	29	7	1	0	1	0	17	4	48	11	3	0
4	MF	(France) Olivier Dacourt	33	3	1	0	0	0	14	1	48	3	16	1
5	DF	(South Africa) Lucas Radebe	19+1	0	1	0	0+1	0	10	0	30+2	0	7	1
6	DF	(England) Jonathan Woodgate	14	1	1	0	1	0	5	0	21	1	4	0
7	FW	(Republic of Ireland) Robbie Keane	12+6	9	2	0	0	0	0	0	14+6	9	1	0
8	FW	(England) Michael Bridges	6+1	0	0	0	0	0	4	0	10+1	0	0	0
9	FW	(Australia) Mark Viduka	34	17	2	1	1	0	16	4	53	22	7	0
10	FW	(Australia) Harry Kewell	12+5	2	0	0	0	0	6	0	18+8	2	3	0
11	MF	(England) Lee Bowyer	38	9	1	0	0	0	15	6	54	15	12	0
12	FW	(England) Darren Huckerby	2+5	0	0	0	1	2	0+3	1	3+8	3	0	0
13	GK	(England) Paul Robinson	15+1	0	1	0	1	0	6	0	23+1	0	0	0
14	MF	(Republic of Ireland) Stephen McPhail	3+4	0	0	0	0	0	1+2	0	4+6	0	0	0
16	MF	(England) Jason Wilcox	7+10	0	0+1	0	1	0	2+3	1	9+14	1	0	0
17	FW	(England) Alan Smith	26+7	11	1+1	0	0+1	0	16	7	43+9	18	11	2
18	DF	(England) Danny Mills	20+3	1	1	0	0	0	15+1	0	36+4	0	11	0
19	MF	(Norway) Eirik Bakke	24+5	2	2	0	1	0	10+2	1	37+7	3	12	1
20	MF	(Wales) Matt Jones	3+1	0	0	0	1	0	1	0	5+1	0	0	0
21	DF	(Scotland) Dominic Matteo	30	0	2	0	1	0	15	2	48	2	3	0
22	DF	(England) Michael Duberry	5	0	0	0	0	0	4	0	9	0	1	0
23	MF	(England) David Batty	13	0	2	0	0	0	7+1	0	22+4	0	4	1
24	DF	(New Zealand) Danny Hay	2+2	0	0	0	1	0	0+1	0	3+3	0	0	0
25	MF	(Australia) Jacob Burns	3+1	0	0	0	1	0	3+1	0	7+2	0	0	0
27	DF	(Republic of Ireland) Alan Maybury	0	0	0	0	0	0	1	0	1	0	0	0
29	DF	(England) Rio Ferdinand	23	2	2	0	0	0	7	1	32	3	1	0
31	DF	(England) Gareth Evans	0+1	0	0	0	1	0	0+1	0	0+2	0	0	0
38	MF	(England) Tony Hackworth	0	0	0	0	0+1	0	0+2	0	0+3	0	0	0

== Transfers ==
=== In ===
Date	Pos.	Name	From	Fee	Ref.
15 May 2000	MF	(France) Olivier Dacourt	(France) Lens	£7,200,000	
2 July 2000	FW	(Australia) Mark Viduka	(Scotland) Celtic	£7,000,000	
17 August 2000	DF	(Scotland) Dominic Matteo	(England) Liverpool	£4,750,000	
31 August 2000	MF	(Australia) Jacob Burns	(Australia) Parramatta Power	£250,000	
26 November 2000	DF	(England) Rio Ferdinand	(England) West Ham United	£18,000,000	
25 April 2001	FW	(Republic of Ireland) Robbie Keane	(Italy) Inter Milan	£12,000,000	

=== Out ===
Date	Pos.	Name	To	Fee	Ref.
25 May 2000	DF	(Austria) Martin Hiden	(Austria) Salzburg	£500,000	
13 June 2000	MF	(Norway) Alf-Inge Haaland	(England) Manchester City	£2,500,000	
7 July 2000	MF	(Scotland) David Hopkin	(England) Bradford City	£2,500,000	
31 August 2000	MF	(Wales) Kevin Evans	(Wales) Cardiff City	Free	
1 December 2000	DF	(Netherlands) Robert Molenaar	(England) Bradford City	£500,000	
14 December 2000	MF	(Wales) Matt Jones	(England) Leicester City	£3,000,000	
29 December 2000	FW	(England) Darren Huckerby	(England) Manchester City	£2,500,000	
19 March 2001	FW	(England) Lee Matthews	(England) Bristol City	£70,000	

=== Loan in ===
Date from	Date to	Pos.	Name	From	Ref.
20 December 2000	25 April 2001	FW	(Republic of Ireland) Robbie Keane	(Italy) Inter Milan	

=== Loan out ===
Date from	Date to	Pos.	Name	To
8 October 2000	31 December 2000	DF	(Republic of Ireland) Alan Maybury	(England) Crewe Alexandra
15 March 2001	19 March 2001	FW	(England) Lee Matthews	(England) Bristol City
22 March 2001	5 May 2001	FW	(Northern Ireland) Warren Feeney	(England) Bournemouth
