= Paul Harford =

English footballer

Personal information
- Date of birth: 21 October 1974 (age 52)
- Place of birth: Chelmsford, England

Youth career
- 1992–1993: Arsenal

Senior career*
Years	Team	Apps	(Gls)
1993–1996	Blackburn Rovers	0	(0)
1994	→ Wigan Athletic (loan)	3	(0)
1994–1995	→ Shrewsbury Town (loan)	6	(0)
1996–1998	Farnborough Town		
1998–2001	Sutton United		
2001–2002	Aldershot Town		
- * Club domestic league appearances and goals

Paul Harford (born 21 October 1974) is an English former footballer. His father was Ray Harford, who played for and managed numerous clubs.

== Playing career ==
A former Arsenal trainee, he began his professional career at Blackburn Rovers, where his father, Ray Harford, was assistant manager to Kenny Dalglish. He was loaned out to Wigan Athletic at the start of the 1994–95 season, and made three Third Division appearances. He joined Fred Davies's Shrewsbury Town on loan in December, and played six Second Division games. He left Ewood Park at the end of 1995–96, despite his father having by then taken the management reins from Dalglish. He then spent 1996–97 and 1997–98 in the Football Conference with Farnborough Town. He then spent three seasons in the Isthmian League with Sutton United and one season with Aldershot Town.
