= Tim Flowers =

English footballer (born 1967)

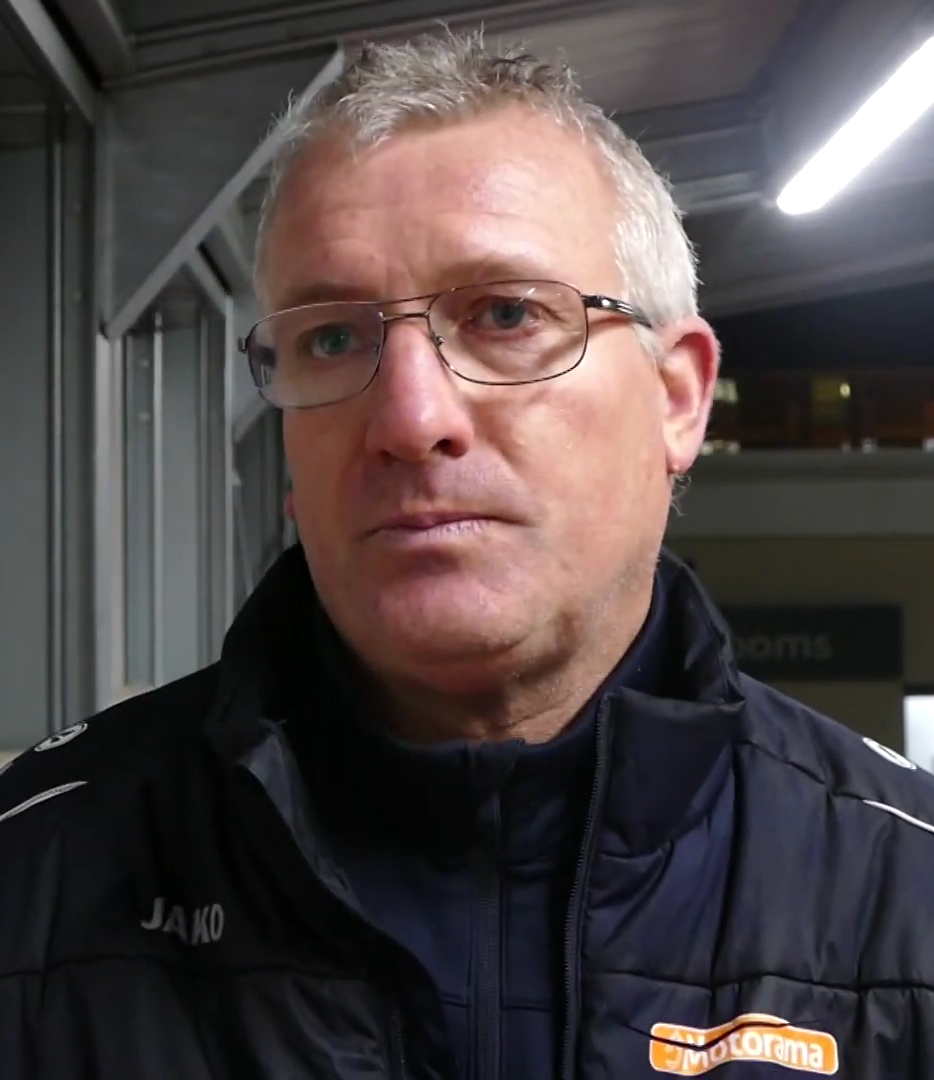
- Flowers in 2020

Personal information
- Full name: Timothy David Flowers
- Date of birth: 3 February 1967 (age 59)
- Place of birth: Kenilworth, England
- Height: 6 ft 2 in (1.88 m)
- Position: Goalkeeper

Team information
- Current team: Bromsgrove Sporting (manager)

Senior career*
| Years | Team | Apps | (Gls) |
| 1984–1986 | Wolverhampton Wanderers | 63 | (0) |
| 1986–1993 | Southampton | 192 | (0) |
| 1987 | → Swindon Town (loan) | 7 | (0) |
| 1993–1999 | Blackburn Rovers | 177 | (0) |
| 1999–2003 | Leicester City | 56 | (0) |
| 2001 | → Stockport County (loan) | 4 | (0) |
| 2002 | → Coventry City (loan) | 5 | (0) |
| 2002 | → Manchester City (loan) | 0 | (0) |
| Total | | 504 | (0) |

International career
| 1983 | England U17 | 2 | (0) |
| 1984 | England Youth | 1 | (0) |
| 1987 | England U21 | 3 | (0) |
| 1993–1998 | England | 11 | (0) |

Managerial career
- 2010–2011: Stafford Rangers
- 2011: Northampton Town (caretaker)
- 2013: Northampton Town (caretaker)
- 2018–2020: Solihull Moors
- 2020: Macclesfield Town
- 2020–2021: Barnet
- 2021–2022: Stratford Town
- 2023: Gloucester City
- 2024: Bromsgrove Sporting (caretaker)
- 2024: Redditch United
- 2024–2025: Alvechurch
- 2025–: Bromsgrove Sporting
- * Club domestic league appearances and goals

Timothy David Flowers (born 3 February 1967) is an English football manager and former player who currently manages Bromsgrove Sporting.

He played as a goalkeeper from 1984 until 2003, notably in the Premier League for Blackburn Rovers where he was part of the side that won the 1994–95 FA Premier League. He also played in the top flight for Southampton and Leicester City as well as a brief stint at Manchester City that yielded no appearances. He also played in the Football League for Wolverhampton Wanderers, Swindon Town, Stockport County and Coventry City. He earned eleven caps for England and was part of their Euro 1996 and 1998 World Cup squads.

Following his retirement, Flowers has largely worked as a goalkeeping coach in the professional game or as a manager in Non-League. He has managed Stafford Rangers, Solihull Moors, Macclesfield Town, Barnet, Stratford Town, Gloucester City, Bromsgrove Sporting, Redditch United and Alvechurch, as well as working on the coaching staff at Leicester City, Manchester City, Coventry City, Queens Park Rangers, Northampton Town, Kidderminster Harriers, Nottingham Forest, and Cheltenham Town.

== Club career ==
=== Wolverhampton Wanderers ===
Flowers was born in Kenilworth, Warwickshire, and began his career with Wolverhampton Wanderers in 1984. He quickly broke into the first team, becoming their regular goalkeeper by his 18th birthday, but his breakthrough came at the bleakest time in the club's history, as the two seasons he spent there both ended in relegation (in 1984–85) to the Third Division and in 1985–86 to the Fourth. After Wolves fell into the Fourth Division to complete a hat-trick of successive relegations, they had to sell Flowers as part of the effort to avoid bankruptcy.

=== Southampton ===
Flowers joined First Division club Southampton for £70,000 in June 1986. He was understudy to Peter Shilton in 1986–87, but managed nine league appearances (the first in a 5–1 defeat to Manchester United in mid September) and also played a further nine games on loan to Swindon Town in the Third Division. He made another nine league appearances in 1987–88 (by which time Shilton had joined Derby County) and returned to Swindon for a five-match loan spell, before becoming Southampton's regular goalkeeper in the 1989–90 season. Within a couple of years of becoming Southampton's first choice goalkeeper, Flowers was regarded as one of the best goalkeepers in the English league and inevitable rumours of a transfer to a bigger club began.

=== Blackburn Rovers ===
Flowers left Southampton on 4 November 1993 when a £2.4 million move to Blackburn Rovers made him the most expensive goalkeeper in Britain. His excellent goalkeeping was not quite enough to win Blackburn the Premier League title in the 1993–94 FA Premier League, but they did finish second to Manchester United, and went one better the following year when they won their first top division title since 1914. He remained at Ewood Park for another four seasons before Blackburn were relegated in 1999.

=== Leicester City ===
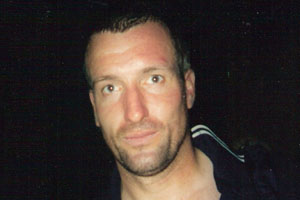
Flowers in 2001

Flowers was transferred to Leicester City, where he collected a Football League Cup winner's medal in his first season. In August 2002 he went on loan to Manchester City to provide cover for Carlo Nash after injuries to Peter Schmeichel and Nicky Weaver. He stayed with Leicester for one season after their relegation to Division One two years later before retiring as a player. His final appearance for Leicester City was against Wolverhampton Wanderers at Molineux in May 2003. It was the final game of the season, and with Leicester 1–0 down, Flowers came on as a late substitute for Ian Walker. Leicester were awarded a late penalty, and despite shouts from the travelling Leicester fans for Flowers to take the penalty, and Flowers himself signalling to the bench, manager Micky Adams ignored the fans and ordered Trevor Benjamin to take it, who scored.

== International career ==
Flowers won 11 caps with England between 1993 and 1998. He was in the squads for both Euro 96 in England and the 1998 FIFA World Cup in France. He retired following the 2002–03 season.

== Coaching and managerial career ==
Following a spell as goalkeeper coach for both Leicester City and Manchester City, on 19 February 2007 Flowers was appointed as assistant manager to Iain Dowie at Coventry City. Flowers left Coventry on 11 February 2008 after Dowie was dismissed, before joining him again at Queens Park Rangers. He left the assistant manager's role at QPR after Dowie was dismissed.

In February 2010, he was appointed part-time goalkeeper coach at Northampton Town, as well as mentoring Dean Coleman and Yasbir Singh at Kidderminster Harriers.

On 17 March 2010, he re-joined Dowie when he was appointed as assistant manager at Premiership club, Hull City.

On 14 October he was appointed manager of Conference North team Stafford Rangers. However, Flowers resigned on 11 January 2011 after just nine games in charge.

On 22 November 2011, Flowers become manager of his second club, this time being appointed caretaker manager of Northampton Town on 22 November 2011. He only managed the club for one game, losing 4–1 to Plymouth Argyle, before Aidy Boothroyd became permanent manager at the club, although Flowers remained as goalkeeping coach. When Boothroyd was dismissed by Northampton in January 2014, Flowers continued on the coaching staff under caretaker boss Andy King, but he left the club on 30 January 2014 following the appointment earlier that week of Chris Wilder as the new manager of Northampton Town.

On 6 March 2014, Flowers was appointed first-team coach at Kidderminster Harriers.

In July 2014, Flowers started working as a goalkeeper coach at Nottingham Forest under his former teammate, Nottingham Forest manager Stuart Pearce. Flowers left Forest following the dismissal of Pearce in February 2015.

On 11 September 2015, it was reported that Flowers had replaced Gary Whild as manager of Kidderminster Harriers, but he left the club within a fortnight to be replaced by Dave Hockaday.

On 20 June 2018, he returned to management with Solihull Moors replacing Mark Yates, who had joined newly promoted Football League side Macclesfield Town. He left Solihull Moors by mutual consent on 28 January 2020.

On 28 August 2020, Flowers was appointed as manager of then newly relegated Macclesfield Town, but the club was wound-up on 16 September 2020, before playing a competitive first team game.

Flowers was appointed manager at Barnet on 14 December 2020. He left Barnet by mutual consent on 10 March 2021 after losing 11 of his 12 games in charge.

On 25 November 2021, Flowers was appointed manager at Stratford Town.

On 19 May 2023, Flowers was announced as manager of National League North side Gloucester City. On 17 September 2023, Flowers left Gloucester City by mutual agreement. After brief spells at Bromsgrove Sporting and Redditch United, he joined Alvechurch in November 2024, only to resign a year later. On 10 December 2025, Flowers returned to Bromsgrove Sporting.

== Career statistics ==
Appearances and goals by club, season and competition
| Club | Season | League | | | FA Cup | | League Cup | | Other | | Total | |
| Club | Season | Division | Apps | Goals | Apps | Goals | Apps | Goals | Apps | Goals | Apps | Goals |
|---|---|---|---|---|---|---|---|---|---|---|---|---|
| Wolverhampton Wanderers | 1984–85 | Second Division | 38 | 0 | 2 | 0 | 4 | 0 | 0 | 0 | 44 | 0 |
| Wolverhampton Wanderers | 1985–86 | Third Division | 25 | 0 | 0 | 0 | 1 | 0 | 2 (Note: Appearances in Associate Members' Cup) | 0 | 28 | 0 |
| Wolverhampton Wanderers | Total | | 63 | 0 | 2 | 0 | 5 | 0 | 2 | 0 | 72 | 0 |
| Southampton (loan) | 1985–86 | First Division | 0 | 0 | 0 | 0 | 0 | 0 | — | | 0 | 0 |
| Southampton | 1986–87 | First Division | 9 | 0 | 0 | 0 | 0 | 0 | — | | 9 | 0 |
| Southampton | 1987–88 | First Division | 9 | 0 | 0 | 0 | 2 | 0 | — | | 11 | 0 |
| Southampton | 1988–89 | First Division | 7 | 0 | 0 | 0 | 0 | 0 | 1 (Note: Appearances in Full Members' Cup) | 0 | 8 | 0 |
| Southampton | 1989–90 | First Division | 35 | 0 | 3 | 0 | 7 | 0 | — | | 45 | 0 |
| Southampton | 1990–91 | First Division | 37 | 0 | 5 | 0 | 6 | 0 | 1 | 0 | 49 | 0 |
| Southampton | 1991–92 | First Division | 41 | 0 | 7 | 0 | 5 | 0 | 6 | 0 | 59 | 0 |
| Southampton | 1992–93 | Premier League | 42 | 0 | 1 | 0 | 3 | 0 | — | | 46 | 0 |
| Southampton | 1993–94 | Premier League | 12 | 0 | 0 | 0 | 2 | 0 | — | | 14 | 0 |
| Southampton | Total | | 192 | 0 | 16 | 0 | 25 | 0 | 8 | 0 | 241 | 0 |
| Swindon Town (loan) | 1986–87 | Third Division | 2 | 0 | 0 | 0 | 0 | 0 | — | | 2 | 0 |
| Swindon Town (loan) | 1987–88 | Second Division | 5 | 0 | 0 | 0 | 0 | 0 | — | | 5 | 0 |
| Swindon Town (loan) | Total | | 7 | 0 | 0 | 0 | 0 | 0 | 0 | 0 | 7 | 0 |
| Blackburn Rovers | 1993–94 | Premier League | 29 | 0 | 4 | 0 | 0 | 0 | — | | 33 | 0 |
| Blackburn Rovers | 1994–95 | Premier League | 39 | 0 | 2 | 0 | 4 | 0 | 3 (Note: Appearances in Charity Shield and UEFA Cup) | 0 | 48 | 0 |
| Blackburn Rovers | 1995–96 | Premier League | 37 | 0 | 2 | 0 | 3 | 0 | 7 (Note: Appearances in Charity Shield and UEFA Champions League) | 0 | 49 | 0 |
| Blackburn Rovers | 1996–97 | Premier League | 36 | 0 | 2 | 0 | 3 | 0 | — | | 41 | 0 |
| Blackburn Rovers | 1997–98 | Premier League | 25 | 0 | 3 | 0 | 3 | 0 | — | | 31 | 0 |
| Blackburn Rovers | 1998–99 | Premier League | 11 | 0 | 1 | 0 | 1 | 0 | 2 (Note: Appearances in Europa League) | 0 | 15 | 0 |
| Blackburn Rovers | Total | | 177 | 0 | 14 | 0 | 14 | 0 | 12 | 0 | 217 | 0 |
| Leicester City | 1999–2000 | Premier League | 29 | 0 | 2 | 0 | 6 | 0 | — | | 37 | 0 |
| Leicester City | 2000–01 | Premier League | 22 | 0 | 0 | 0 | 0 | 0 | 2 | 0 | 24 | 0 |
| Leicester City | 2001–02 | Premier League | 4 | 0 | 0 | 0 | 0 | 0 | — | | 4 | 0 |
| Leicester City | 2002–03 | First Division | 1 | 0 | 0 | 0 | 0 | 0 | — | | 1 | 0 |
| Leicester City | Total | | 56 | 0 | 2 | 0 | 6 | 0 | 2 | 0 | 66 | 0 |
| Stockport County (loan) | 2001–02 | First Division | 4 | 0 | 0 | 0 | 0 | 0 | — | | 4 | 0 |
| Coventry City (loan) | 2001–02 | First Division | 5 | 0 | 0 | 0 | 0 | 0 | — | | 5 | 0 |
| Manchester City (loan) | 2002–03 | Premier League | 0 | 0 | 0 | 0 | 0 | 0 | — | | 0 | 0 |
| Career total | | | 504 | 0 | 34 | 0 | 50 | 0 | 24 | 0 | 612 | 0 |

== Honours ==
Southampton

- Full Members' Cup runner-up: 1991–92

Blackburn Rovers

- Premier League: 1994–95

Leicester City

- Football League Cup: 1999–2000

England

- Tournoi de France: 1997

Individual

- PFA Team of the Year: 1993–94 Premier League, 1994–95 Premier League
- Premier League Player of the Month: January 1997, September 2000
