= Steve Hitchen =

English footballer

Personal information
- Full name: Steven James Hitchen

Steven James Hitchen (born 28 November 1976) is the director of football at sporting agency Unique Sports Group and former Director of Technical Performance for Tottenham Hotspur.

== Career ==
After his playing career ended, Hitchen worked as a football talent scout . He started at Tottenham Hotspur in the mid-2000s as a part-time European scout, and played a part in the signings of Luka Modrić and Benoît Assou-Ekotto. He moved to Liverpool in 2010 to join Damien Comolli who was once his superior as the director of football at Tottenham. He helped sign Luis Suárez to Liverpool in 2011. He then became head of European scouting for Queens Park Rangers, and in 2016 joint director of recruitment at Derby County. He was appointed the chief scout for Tottenham Hotspur in February 2017 as a replacement for Paul Mitchell and left the club in February 2022. On 26 October 2023, Hitchen became director of football at sporting agency Unique Sports Group.
