= Tim Sherwood =

English association football player and manager (born 1969)

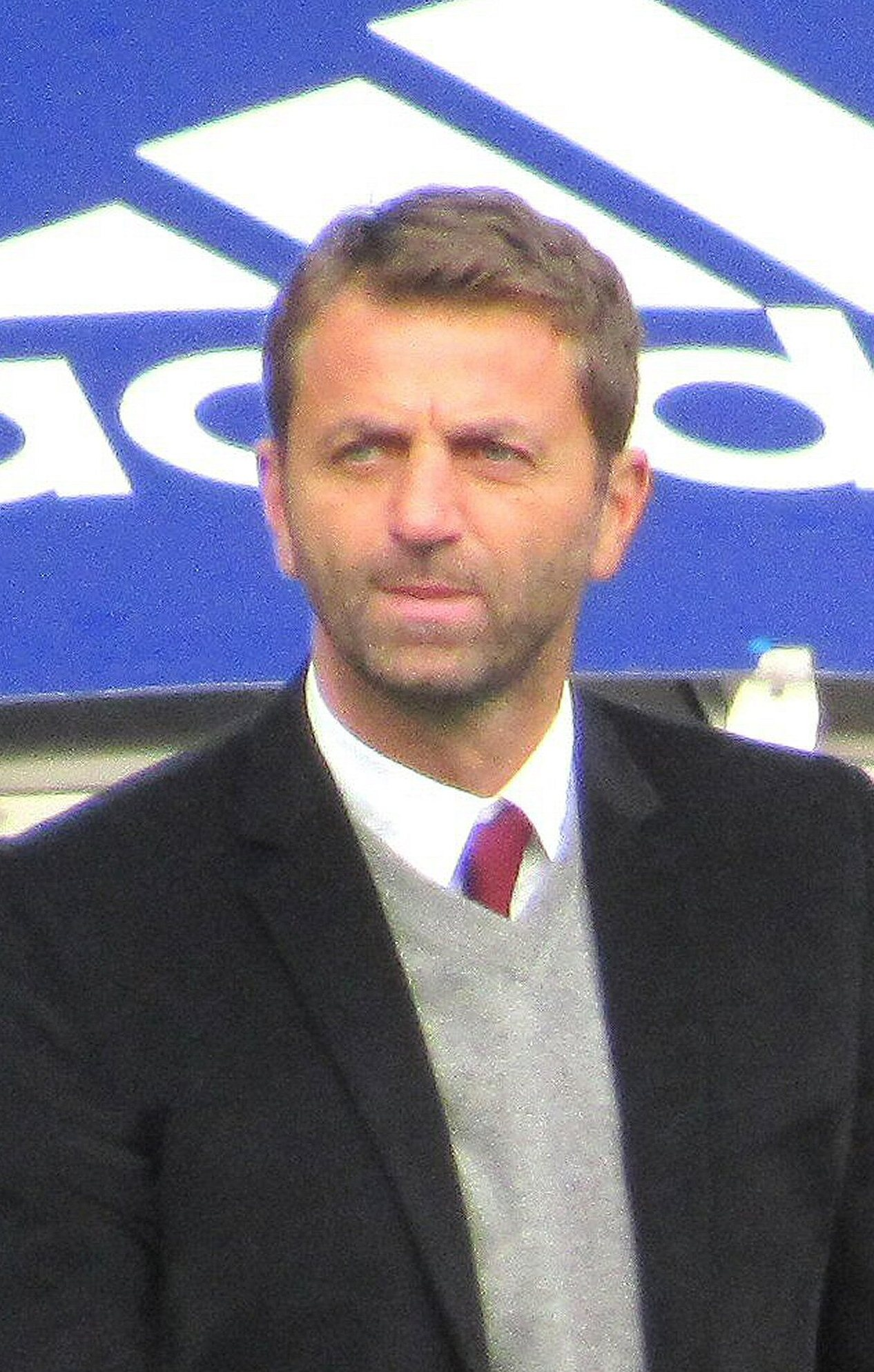
- Sherwood in 2015

Personal information
- Full name: Timothy Alan Sherwood
- Date of birth: 6 February 1969 (age 57)
- Place of birth: Borehamwood, England
- Height: 5 ft 10 in (1.78 m)
- Position: Midfielder

Youth career
- –1987: Watford

Senior career*
Years	Team	Apps	(Gls)
1987–1989	Watford	32	(2)
1989–1992	Norwich City	71	(10)
1992–1999	Blackburn Rovers	246	(25)
1999–2003	Tottenham Hotspur	93	(12)
2003–2004	Portsmouth	30	(1)
2004–2005	Coventry City	11	(0)
Total		483	(50)

International career
1990	England U21	4	(0)
1994	England B	1	(0)
1999	England	3	(0)

Managerial career
- 2013–2014: Tottenham Hotspur
- 2015: Aston Villa
- * Club domestic league appearances and goals

Timothy Alan Sherwood (born 6 February 1969) is an English former football player and manager.

As a player, he was a midfielder from 1987 until 2005, notably as captain of Blackburn Rovers's Premier League title-winning side in 1995. He also played for Watford, Norwich City, Tottenham Hotspur, Portsmouth and Coventry City. He made three appearances for the England national team in 1999.

Sherwood began his coaching career at Tottenham Hotspur, progressing from assistant first-team coach to manager in a five-year spell, then managing the club from December 2013 to his dismissal in May 2014. He resumed his managerial career at Aston Villa in February 2015, taking them to that season's FA Cup final and saving them from relegation from the Premier League, until being sacked in October 2015. Sherwood was director of football at Swindon Town from November 2016 until June 2017.

== Club career ==
=== Early career ===
Born in Borehamwood, Hertfordshire, Sherwood supported Arsenal as a child. He made his debut for Watford against Sheffield Wednesday on 12 September 1987. He made a total of 32 league appearances in Division Two for Watford before moving to Norwich City in July 1989. He played 88 games, scoring 13 goals, for Norwich before joining Blackburn Rovers in February 1992.

=== Blackburn Rovers ===
As one of Kenny Dalglish's first signings for Blackburn, he initially struggled to make the first team but went on to become a core player. Under his captaincy, Blackburn finished second in the Premiership in 1993–94 before winning it the following season. After winning the league, new manager Ray Harford wished to sign Frenchmen Zinedine Zidane and Christophe Dugarry, but owner Jack Walker said "Why do you want to sign Zidane, when we have Tim Sherwood?"; Sherwood told the Lancashire Telegraph in 2009 that he witnessed the French players negotiating with Harford, but Walker was of the opinion that there was no need to change a winning squad.

=== Tottenham Hotspur ===
With Sherwood unsettled in 1999 and having family and business links in Hertfordshire, George Graham paid a reported fee of £3 million to bring him to Tottenham Hotspur in the first week of February 1999. He made his debut for Spurs as an 87th-minute substitute for Mauricio Taricco in the 0–0 draw with Coventry on 6 February. He was cup-tied for their victory in the 1999 Football League Cup Final. Sherwood won a runners-up medal with Spurs in the 2002 League Cup Final, when they were beaten by his former club Blackburn.

=== Portsmouth ===
Sherwood left Tottenham, moving to Portsmouth on an initial four-month contract, on 29 January 2003. Upon signing, he immediately became a regular in the side that went on to win the First Division Championship that season, scoring once in the process, in a 5–0 win away to Millwall on 1 March. Sherwood remained an important member of the Pompey squad for the first half of the 2003–04 Premier League season, scoring a brace in a 5–2 win against Third Division Northampton Town in the League Cup second round on 23 September. He broke his leg against Tottenham on 26 December, after a challenge by his former teammate Taricco. It was to be his last match for the club as, along with fellow veteran Teddy Sheringham, he was released in the 2004 close season.

=== Coventry City ===
On 9 July 2004, Sherwood signed for Peter Reid's Coventry City on a two-year deal with Coventry and said that he would "desperately like to achieve promotion" with the club. Although he was the captain, he was unpopular with fans, due to his frequent injuries, high wages and decision to do television punditry during his spell. At the end of the 2004–05 season, Coventry had not been promoted and the club announced that Sherwood could leave on a free transfer. He parted company with the Sky Blues by mutual consent on 1 July 2005.

== International career ==
During his time with Blackburn Rovers he added an England B cap to the England Under 21 honours he picked up whilst at Norwich.

At the age of 30, Sherwood made his debut for England in their 3–1 UEFA Euro 2000 qualification victory over Poland at Wembley on 27 March 1999, under new manager Kevin Keegan. He earned a further two caps that year: in a 1–1 friendly draw with Hungary in Budapest on 28 April, and a goalless qualifying draw with Sweden at Wembley on 5 June.

== Managerial career ==
=== Tottenham Hotspur ===
In October 2008, Sherwood joined Tottenham Hotspur as assistant first-team coach, under new manager Harry Redknapp. Sherwood became Technical Director in 2012 and in that role led Spurs's Under-21 side in the inaugural Under-21 Premier League season, guiding the side to finish top in both group and elite stages. Sherwood's side eventually lost the league final 3–2 to Manchester United.

On 16 December 2013, Tottenham announced that Sherwood would "assume first team coaching duties" following the departure of André Villas-Boas as the manager. He lost his first game in charge, 2–1 at home to West Ham in the fifth round of the League Cup, but four days later managed a 3–2 Premier League win over Southampton. On 23 December, Spurs named Sherwood as their new head coach, handing him an 18-month contract until the end of the 2014–15 season. His last match as Spurs manager was a 3–0 win over Aston Villa on 11 May 2014. With this win Sherwood achieved a sixth-place finish in the league with Spurs with a total of 69 league points. Sherwood was best known for being on the receiving end of Jorge Jesus' famous touchline dance, when he held up 3 fingers to indicate that Benfica had just scored 3 goals during their Europa League tie in 2014. Sherwood was sacked by chairman Daniel Levy on 13 May 2014.

=== Aston Villa ===
On 14 February 2015, Sherwood was appointed as the new manager of Aston Villa. The announcement was made via the club's official Twitter page, following the sacking of Paul Lambert on 11 February. Although he attended the following day's 2–1 win over Leicester City in the FA Cup and gave a half-time team-talk, his first game in official control of the team was at home to Stoke City almost a week later. Villa lost the game 2–1 after a 93rd-minute penalty from Victor Moses. After also losing his second game in charge, this time going down 1–0 to Newcastle United, Sherwood's first win came on 3 March 2015 against West Midlands rivals West Bromwich Albion. The game finished 2–1, with Christian Benteke scoring a last-minute penalty, which shadowed the decision that went against Villa in the Stoke game. Sherwood led Villa to Wembley for the first time since 2010 just four days later, after winning 2–0 in the FA cup quarter-final again against West Bromwich Albion. Sherwood then led Villa to a third straight win, a 4–0 away win over relegation rivals Sunderland in which all goals were scored in the first half. On 19 April 2015, Aston Villa reached the FA Cup Final for the first time since 2000, coming from behind to defeat Liverpool 2–1 in their semi-final at Wembley. However, they went on to lose the final 4–0 to Arsenal. After losing six consecutive matches, including a nine-game winless run which left the team 19th in the table, Sherwood was sacked on 25 October 2015.

=== Swindon Town ===
On 10 November 2016, Sherwood was appointed director of football at League One side Swindon Town. On 14 June 2017, it was confirmed that Sherwood would leave his post, following the club's relegation to League Two.

== Media work ==
Sherwood has often appeared as footballing pundit on Al-Jazeera Sport offering comments on English football. He was also a pundit for Setanta Sports for their Premier League coverage. Most recently, Sherwood has worked as a pundit on Amazon Prime Video's Premier League Goals Show.

== Career statistics ==
=== Club ===
Appearances and goals by club, season and competition
Club	Season	League			FA Cup		League Cup		Europe		Other		Total	
Club	Season	Division	Apps	Goals	Apps	Goals	Apps	Goals	Apps	Goals	Apps	Goals	Apps	Goals
Watford	1987–88	First Division	13	0	3	0	3	0	—		1 (Note: Appearance(s) in Full Members' Cup)	0	20	0
Watford	1988–89	Second Division	19	2	6	0	2	0	—		4	0	32	2
Watford	Total		32	2	9	0	5	0	—		5	0	51	2
Norwich City	1989–90	First Division	27	3	—		3	0	—		2	1	32	4
Norwich City	1990–91	First Division	37	7	4	0	3	1	—		4	1	48	9
Norwich City	1991–92	First Division	7	0	0	0	1	0	—		0	0	8	0
Norwich City	Total		71	10	4	0	7	1	—		6	2	88	13
Blackburn Rovers	1991–92	Second Division	11	0	—		—		—		0	0	11	0
Blackburn Rovers	1992–93	Premier League	39	3	5	0	6	0	—		—		50	3
Blackburn Rovers	1993–94	Premier League	38	2	3	1	5	0	—		—		46	3
Blackburn Rovers	1994–95	Premier League	38	6	1	0	3	0	2 (Note: Appearances in UEFA Cup)	0	1 (Note: Appearance in Charity Shield)	0	45	6
Blackburn Rovers	1995–96	Premier League	33	3	2	0	4	0	6 (Note: Appearances in UEFA Champions League)	0	1	0	46	3
Blackburn Rovers	1996–97	Premier League	37	3	2	1	3	1	—		—		42	5
Blackburn Rovers	1997–98	Premier League	31	5	4	2	2	0	—		—		37	7
Blackburn Rovers	1998–99	Premier League	19	3	0	0	2	1	2	0	—		23	4
Blackburn Rovers	Total		246	25	17	4	25	2	10	0	2	0	300	31
Tottenham Hotspur	1998–99	Premier League	14	2	4	1	—		—		—		18	3
Tottenham Hotspur	1999–2000	Premier League	27	8	1	0	2	1	3	1	—		33	10
Tottenham Hotspur	2000–01	Premier League	33	2	4	0	2	0	—		—		39	2
Tottenham Hotspur	2001–02	Premier League	19	0	4	0	5	1	—		—		28	1
Tottenham Hotspur	2002–03	Premier League	0	0	0	0	0	0	—		—		0	0
Tottenham Hotspur	Total		93	12	13	1	9	2	3	1	—		118	16
Portsmouth	2002–03	First Division	17	1	—		—		—		—		17	1
Portsmouth	2003–04	Premier League	13	0	0	0	3	2	—		—		16	2
Portsmouth	Total		30	1	0	0	3	2	—		—		33	3
Coventry City	2004–05	Championship	11	0	0	0	0	0	—		—		11	0
Career total			483	50	43	5	49	7	13	1	13	2	601	65

== Managerial statistics ==
As of 25 October 2015

Managerial record by team and tenure
Team	From	To	Record				
Team	From	To	P	W	D	L	Win %
Tottenham Hotspur	16 December 2013	13 May 2014	28	14	4	10	50.0
Aston Villa	14 February 2015	25 October 2015	28	10	2	16	35.7
Total			56	24	6	26	42.9

== Honours ==
=== Player ===
Blackburn Rovers

- Premier League: 1994–95

Tottenham Hotspur

- Football League Cup runner-up: 2001–02

Portsmouth

- Football League First Division: 2002–03

Individual

- PFA Team of the Year: 1994–95 Premier League

=== Manager ===
Aston Villa

- FA Cup runner-up: 2014–15
