= Darren Collier =

English footballer (born 1967)

Personal information
- Full name: Darren Collier
- Date of birth: 1 December 1967 (age 58)
- Place of birth: Stockton-on-Tees, England
- Height: 6 ft 0 in (1.83 m)
- Position: Goalkeeper

Senior career*
Years	Team	Apps	(Gls)
1984–1986	Middlesbrough	0	(0)
1987–1993	Blackburn Rovers	27	(0)
1993–1995	Darlington	44	(0)
1995–1996	Sing Tao		
1996–1998	Berwick Rangers	17	(0)
- Billingham Town
- * Club domestic league appearances and goals

Darren Collier (born 1 December 1967) is an English former professional footballer who played as a goalkeeper in the Football League for Blackburn Rovers and Darlington, in the Hong Kong First Division League for Sing Tao, and in the Scottish League for Berwick Rangers. He was born in Stockton-on-Tees, and began his professional football career on a non-contract basis with Middlesbrough.
