= Richard Brown (footballer) =

English footballer

Personal information
- Full name: Richard Anthony Brown
- Date of birth: 13 January 1967 (age 59)
- Place of birth: Nottingham, England
- Position: Full-back

Youth career
- Nottingham Forest

Senior career*
Years	Team	Apps	(Gls)
1984–1985	Ilkeston Town		
1985–1990	Sheffield Wednesday	0	(0)
1990	Kettering Town		
1990–1995	Blackburn Rovers	28	(0)
1991	→ Maidstone United (loan)	3	(0)
1995	Stockport County	1	(0)
- * Club domestic league appearances and goals

Richard Anthony Brown (born 13 January 1967) is an English former football full-back. He played in both the Football League and the Premier League, representing Sheffield Wednesday, Blackburn Rovers, Maidstone United and Stockport County. He began his career with Ilkeston Town and also played non-league football for several other clubs.

Brown played youth football with local club Nottingham Forest and was an associated schoolboy at the club. However he was not offered professional terms and dropped out of league football to play for Ilkeston, where his performances caught the attention of Sheffield Wednesday, with whom he turned professional. However Brown did not make a first team appearance and returned to the non-league scene, initially with Ilkeston before playing for Grantham Town, Boston United and Kettering Town. It was from the latter that he returned to the Football League, signing for Blackburn Rovers in 1990. Due to his lack of league experience he was loaned out to Maidstone United in 1991 and made his Football League debut on 23 February at Hereford United.

Returning to Blackburn, Brown, who although right-footed operated on either flank in a full back role, made his Rovers debut in a home game against Port Vale on 14 September 1991 but was rarely used by the club thereafter. He returned to the first team for a run of games following the appointment of Kenny Dalglish as manager although his path into the first team was usually blocked by Chris Price and David May. He remained at the club until 1995, when he moved on a free transfer to Stockport County. Brown retired from football aged 27 after being dogged by injuries throughout his career.

As of 2017 Brown was reported as working for Salford Community Leisure.
