= Stuart Ripley =

English footballer

Personal information
- Full name: Stuart Edward Ripley
- Date of birth: 20 November 1967 (age 58)
- Place of birth: Middlesbrough, England
- Height: 5 ft 11 in (1.80 m)
- Position: Winger

Youth career
- Middlesbrough

Senior career*
| Years | Team | Apps | (Gls) |
| 1985–1992 | Middlesbrough | 249 | (26) |
| 1986 | → Bolton Wanderers (loan) | 5 | (1) |
| 1992–1998 | Blackburn Rovers | 187 | (13) |
| 1998–2002 | Southampton | 53 | (1) |
| 2000–2001 | → Barnsley (loan) | 10 | (1) |
| 2001 | → Sheffield Wednesday (loan) | 6 | (1) |
| Total | | 510 | (43) |

International career
| 1986 | England Youth | 4 | (0) |
| 1988–1989 | England U21 | 8 | (1) |
| 1993–1997 | England | 2 | (0) |
- * Club domestic league appearances and goals

Stuart Edward Ripley (born 20 November 1967) is an English former professional footballer who played as a winger from 1985 until 2002, notably in the Premier League for Blackburn Rovers and Southampton. He was part of the Rovers squad that won the title in the 1994–95 season. Prior to this he had played just under 250 times in the Football League for Middlesbrough. He also appeared professionally for Bolton Wanderers, Barnsley and Sheffield Wednesday. He earned two national caps for England.

Ripley retired from professional football in 2002 and after working as a sports physio is now working as a solicitor.

== Club career ==
=== Middlesbrough ===
Ripley first made his name with Middlesbrough in the late 1980s, before achieving success in a £1.3 million move to Blackburn Rovers, helping them to the league title in the 1994–95 season and becoming a cult hero. In the 1991–1992 season he helped Middlesbrough achieve promotion to the newly founded Premier League, as well as playing an important role in Middlesbrough getting through to the League Cup semi-final. They also reached the fifth round of the FA Cup losing in a replay to Portsmouth.

=== Blackburn Rovers ===
During the summer of 1992, Ripley was signed by Blackburn Rovers who had achieved promotion along with Middlesbrough. He was briefly their record signing until later in July they signed Alan Shearer for £3.3million. On his debut for Blackburn, he scored the club's first Premier League goal, opening their scoring a 3–3 draw with Crystal Palace at Selhurst Park.

=== Southampton ===
In 1998, aged almost 31, he moved to Southampton, and retiring four years later. He scored one goal for Southampton against Derby County on 4 October 1999. He also served loan spells at Barnsley (twice) – scoring in his debut, a 1–2 home loss to former side Blackburn – and Sheffield Wednesday, where he scored once against Crystal Palace.

== International career ==
He was capped twice by England as a full international; against San Marino on 17 November 1993 and against Moldova on 10 September 1997.

== Personal life ==
After finishing his playing career, Ripley set up the Castleford Physiotherapy & Sports Injury Clinic, providing physiotherapy to nearby rugby league teams, as well as local football teams. He graduated from the University of Central Lancashire in 2007, with a first class combined honours degree in Law and French.

His son, Connor Ripley, is a goalkeeper and plays for Swindon Town.

In 2010 Ripley became a qualified solicitor. He is a member of FA's Judicial Panel hearing cases relating to matters such as doping, safeguarding, agent activity and discrimination.

== Career statistics ==
Appearances and goals by club, season and competition
| Club | Season | League | | | FA Cup | | League Cup | | Other | | Total | |
| Club | Season | Division | Apps | Goals | Apps | Goals | Apps | Goals | Apps | Goals | Apps | Goals |
|---|---|---|---|---|---|---|---|---|---|---|---|---|
| Middlesbrough | 1984–85 | Second Division | 1 | 0 | 0 | 0 | 0 | 0 | — | | 1 | 0 |
| Middlesbrough | 1985–86 | Second Division | 8 | 0 | 0 | 0 | 0 | 0 | — | | 8 | 0 |
| Middlesbrough | 1986–87 | Third Division | 44 | 4 | 3 | 0 | 4 | 2 | — | | 51 | 6 |
| Middlesbrough | 1987–88 | Second Division | 43 | 8 | 4 | 0 | 4 | 0 | 4 (Note: Appearances in 1987–88 Second Division play-offs) | 0 | 55 | 8 |
| Middlesbrough | 1988–89 | First Division | 36 | 4 | 1 | 0 | 2 | 0 | — | | 39 | 4 |
| Middlesbrough | 1989–90 | Second Division | 39 | 1 | 3 | 0 | 2 | 0 | — | | 44 | 1 |
| Middlesbrough | 1990–91 | Second Division | 39 | 6 | 3 | 0 | 4 | 0 | 1 (Note: Appearances in 1990–91 Second Division play-offs) | 0 | 47 | 6 |
| Middlesbrough | 1991–92 | Second Division | 39 | 3 | 4 | 0 | 7 | 1 | — | | 50 | 4 |
| Middlesbrough | Total | | 249 | 26 | 18 | 0 | 23 | 3 | 5 | 0 | 295 | 29 |
| Blackburn Rovers | 1992–93 | Premier League | 40 | 7 | 0 | 0 | 0 | 0 | — | | 40 | 7 |
| Blackburn Rovers | 1993–94 | Premier League | 40 | 4 | 4 | 0 | 0 | 0 | — | | 44 | 4 |
| Blackburn Rovers | 1994–95 | Premier League | 37 | 0 | 1 | 0 | 4 | 0 | 3 (Note: Appearances in Charity Shield and Europa League) | 0 | 45 | 0 |
| Blackburn Rovers | 1995–96 | Premier League | 28 | 0 | 2 | 0 | 3 | 0 | 5 (Note: Appearances in UEFA Champions League) | 0 | 38 | 0 |
| Blackburn Rovers | 1996–97 | Premier League | 13 | 0 | 0 | 0 | 0 | 0 | — | | 13 | 0 |
| Blackburn Rovers | 1997–98 | Premier League | 29 | 2 | 3 | 1 | 0 | 0 | — | | 32 | 3 |
| Blackburn Rovers | Total | | 187 | 13 | 10 | 1 | 7 | 0 | 8 | 0 | 212 | 14 |
| Southampton | 1998–99 | Premier League | 22 | 0 | 1 | 0 | 1 | 0 | — | | 24 | 0 |
| Southampton | 1999-2000 | Premier League | 23 | 1 | 2 | 0 | 2 | 0 | — | | 27 | 1 |
| Southampton | 2000–01 | Premier League | 3 | 0 | 0 | 0 | 1 | 0 | — | | 4 | 0 |
| Southampton | 2001–02 | Premier League | 5 | 0 | 0 | 0 | 1 | 0 | — | | 6 | 0 |
| Southampton | Total | | 53 | 1 | 3 | 0 | 5 | 0 | 0 | 0 | 61 | 1 |
| Barnsley (loan) | 2000–01 | First Division | 10 | 1 | 0 | 0 | 0 | 0 | — | | 10 | 1 |
| Sheffield Wednesday (loan) | 2000–01 | First Division | 6 | 1 | 0 | 0 | 0 | 0 | — | | 6 | 1 |
| Career total | | | 505 | 42 | 31 | 1 | 35 | 3 | 13 | 0 | 584 | 46 |

== Honours ==
Middlesbrough

- Football League Second Division play-offs: 1988
- Full Members' Cup runner-up: 1989–90

Blackburn Rovers

- Premier League: 1994–95
