= Matt Dickins =

English footballer (born 1970)

Personal information
- Full name: Matthew James Dickins
- Date of birth: 3 September 1970 (age 56)
- Place of birth: Sheffield, England
- Height: 6 ft 4 in (1.93 m)
- Position: Goalkeeper

Senior career*
Years	Team	Apps	(Gls)
1989–1991	Sheffield United	0	(0)
1989	→ Leyton Orient (loan)	0	(0)
1991–1992	Lincoln City	27	(0)
1992–1995	Blackburn Rovers	1	(0)
1993	→ Blackpool (loan)	19	(0)
1993	→ Lincoln City (loan)	0	(0)
1994	→ Grimsby Town (loan)	0	(0)
1994	→ Rochdale (loan)	4	(0)
1995–1996	Stockport County	12	(0)
1996–1999	Altrincham	?	(?)
1998–1999	→ Boston United (loan)	3	(0)
1999–2000	Sheffield	?	(?)
Total		63	(0)
- * Club domestic league appearances and goals

Matthew James Dickins (born 3 September 1970) is an English former professional footballer who played as a goalkeeper.

== Career ==
Born in Sheffield, West Riding of Yorkshire, Dickins attended All Saints RC Comprehensive school on Granville Road.

Despite being a Sheffield Wednesday fan at school, Dickins began his career as a 19-year-old trainee with Sheffield United. After three years at Bramall Lane with no first-team appearances to his name, he signed for Lincoln City. Despite only making 27 league starts for the Imps, Kenny Dalglish, then manager of Premier League side Blackburn Rovers, saw his promise and signed him as cover for Bobby Mimms for a £250,000 fee in March 1992. He made only one appearance for Rovers, but was a member of the squad that won the Premier League championship in 1995.

During his three years at Ewood Park, Dickins was loaned out to four clubs: Blackpool, his old club Lincoln, Grimsby, and Rochdale.

For the 1995–96 season, he made a permanent move to Stockport, then managed by Dave Jones.

When he played for Altrincham during the 1996–97 campaign, he became only the club's sixth goalkeeper to be an ever-present.
