= Nicky Marker =

English footballer (born 1965)

Personal information
- Full name: Nicholas Robert Thomas Marker
- Date of birth: 3 May 1965 (age 61)
- Place of birth: Budleigh Salterton, Devon, England
- Height: 6 ft 1 in (1.85 m)
- Position: Defender

Youth career
- 1981–1982: Exeter City

Senior career*
| Years | Team | Apps | (Gls) |
| 1983–1987 | Exeter City | 196 | (3) |
| 1987–1992 | Plymouth Argyle | 202 | (13) |
| 1992–1997 | Blackburn Rovers | 54 | (1) |
| 1997–1999 | Sheffield United | 62 | (5) |
| 1999 | → Plymouth Argyle (loan) | 4 | (0) |
| 1999 | Cheltenham Town | 0 | (0) |
| 2000 | Tiverton Town | | |
| 2011 | Ivybridge Town | 1 | (0) |

Managerial career
- 2003–2009: Tamarside (Youth & Reserve Team)
- 2010–2013: Ivybridge Town (Assistant)
- 2013–2018: Ivybridge Town
- * Club domestic league appearances and goals

Nicholas Robert Thomas Marker (born 3 May 1965) is an English football coach and former professional footballer.

As a player he was defender who made more than 500 appearances during his career, notably in the Premier League with Blackburn Rovers where he won the title in 1995. He spent the rest of his professional career in the Football League playing with Exeter City, Plymouth Argyle, Sheffield United and Cheltenham Town before retiring with Non-league side Tiverton Town.

Following his retirement he moved into coaching and had spells with Plymouth based youth club Tamarside before a five year spell in charge of Ivybridge Town, who in 2011 he briefly played for again whilst serving as assistant manager.

== Playing career ==
As a player, he was a defender or midfielder starting his career at Exeter City before a controversial transfer to local rivals Plymouth Argyle with Darran Rowbotham joining Exeter City in part exchange. For this reason, the Plymouth fans took time to accept Marker but his whole hearted performances in a green shirt soon made him a fans' favourite. Marker was awarded the club's Player of the Year award in 1990.

His performances for Argyle also caught the eye of then Blackburn Rovers manager Kenny Dalglish who paid £500,000 to bring Marker to Ewood Park, with both Keith Hill and Craig Skinner moving in the opposite direction. Marker's first team involvement at Blackburn was limited as he was largely used as backup for regular centre-backs Colin Hendry and Henning Berg, or holding midfielder David Batty. He played no games in Blackburn's Premiership 1994/95 title-winning season primarily due to a snapped cruciate knee ligament.

He moved on to Sheffield United in 1997 and made regular appearances over two seasons. However, by this time hip and back injuries were beginning to take their toll and Marker returned to Plymouth Argyle for a short loan period, before spells at Cheltenham Town and Tiverton Town where injuries eventually forced him into premature retirement.

In 2011, eleven years after his retirement, two hip replacements, and at the age of 46, Marker made a single appearance for Ivybridge Town, coming on as a late substitute in a South West Peninsula League match at home to Dartmouth. He was cautioned for a late tackle just 2 minutes after stepping into the pitch.

== Coaching career ==
After retiring from the professional game Marker was involved with Plymouth amateur and youth club Tamarside FC from 2003 to 2009. He joined the club in 2003 to initially help coach his son's team, later getting involved in the club's senior team and was appointed club Chairman in 2006. He combined the role of Reserve Team manager and Youth Manager until leaving the club at the end of the 2008–09 season.

In October 2010 it was announced that Marker had been appointed first team coach of Ivybridge Town, who play in the Premier Division of the South West Peninsula League.

In June 2013 Marker was appointed First Team Manager after the resignation of Graeme Kirkup.
