= David Batty =

English association football player

Personal information
- Full name: David Batty
- Date of birth: 2 December 1968 (age 57)
- Place of birth: Leeds, West Yorkshire, England
- Height: 5 ft 8 in (1.73 m)
- Position: Defensive midfielder

Youth career
- –1987: Leeds United

Senior career*
Years	Team	Apps	(Gls)
1987–1993	Leeds United	211	(4)
1993–1996	Blackburn Rovers	54	(1)
1996–1998	Newcastle United	83	(3)
1998–2004	Leeds United	90	(0)
Total		438	(8)

International career
1988–1989	England U21	7	(1)
1989–1992	England B	5	(0)
1991–1999	England	42	(0)
- * Club domestic league appearances and goals

David Batty (born 2 December 1968) is an English former professional footballer who played as a defensive midfielder.

Batty played for Leeds United, Blackburn Rovers, Newcastle United and the England national team. In total, he made 438 league appearances during a 17-year career, scoring eight goals. He was also capped 42 times by the England national football team, and he represented the nation at UEFA Euro 1992 and the 1998 FIFA World Cup.

Whilst Batty was a player with Leeds, he was part of the team that won the old Football League Second Division and the Football League First Division in its final year before the formation of the Premier League. Batty would go on to lift that title itself when he was part of the Blackburn team that won the League in 1995.

Following retirement in 2004, Batty has lived his life away from the media spotlight and very rarely gives interviews about his career. It is well publicised by some of his former teammates that he cared very little for football and merely saw it as a job he did because he was good at it, as opposed to loving the sport.

== Club career ==
=== Leeds United ===
Born in Leeds, West Riding of Yorkshire, Batty made his debut for Leeds in November 1987 as an 18-year-old during a 4–2 win over Swindon Town, and quickly earned a reputation as a fiercely competitive midfielder in the mould of Leeds legend Billy Bremner. Perceived to be a bit lightweight, to build up Batty's strength Bremner would call him into his office every morning to drink sherry with a raw egg stirred into it. Batty was a key member of the Leeds team that won promotion from the second division in 1989–90, and a member of a midfield which included Gary Speed, Gary McAllister and Gordon Strachan, when Leeds won the first division championship in 1991–92. As a tireless and sometimes ruthless forager of the ball there were few equals, but there was more to his game than simply breaking up opposition attacks; having won the ball, his distribution was excellent, making him the springboard for many counterattacks. If there was one aspect missing from his game it was the lack of goals, as evidenced by cries of "shoot" from Leeds fans when Batty received the ball anywhere within the opponents half.

In October 1993 Leeds manager Howard Wilkinson needed funds to finance the rebuilding of his team, and reluctantly accepted an offer of £2.75 million for Batty from Blackburn Rovers, who were managed by Kenny Dalglish. Wilkinson used the funds to buy Carlton Palmer for £2.6 million eight months later.

=== Blackburn Rovers ===
At this point Blackburn were an emerging force in the newly created Premier League with players such as Alan Shearer and Chris Sutton. He suffered a broken foot which ruled him out of the majority of Blackburn's title-winning campaign in 1994–95, only playing five games for them that season. He refused a winners medal at the end of the season, stating that his contribution had been minimal. By the following season Batty was available to help Blackburn's Champions League campaign. However, the team failed to reach the lucrative knock-out stages; Batty's contribution to the campaign is best remembered for an incident involving himself and his teammate Graeme Le Saux, when they started fighting each other during the Champions' League game against Spartak Moscow.

In 1996 Batty requested a transfer from Blackburn Rovers, and moved to Kevin Keegan's Newcastle United for £3.75 million.

=== Newcastle United ===
With Batty providing midfield bite and cover for the defence, Newcastle were able to challenge the dominant team of the day, Manchester United; Newcastle finished up as runners-up in the league to Manchester United twice (1995–96 and 1996–97). His first full season at St. James' Park saw the departure of Keegan, with Kenny Dalglish taking over and guiding the club to another runners-up spot.

Batty started the 1998 FA Cup Final; however, the arrival of new manager Ruud Gullit in August 1998 marked the start of a team rebuild, and Batty made the move back to Leeds United in December 1998 for £4.4 million.

=== Return to Leeds United ===
Batty rejoined a resurgent Leeds team under the management of David O'Leary; O'Leary wanted Batty to provide bite and experience for his youthful side. A rib injury picked up in his first game kept him on the sidelines for some time, but by the end of the 1998–99 season he was a regular in the Leeds team. However, in the early part of the 1999–2000 season he suffered an Achilles tendon injury, and recovery was lengthened by side effects of the drugs he had to take for the heart problems he suffered as a result of the earlier rib injury. This caused him to miss Euro 2000.

Batty's experience was a key factor in Leeds qualification for the UEFA Champions League, and the cup runs to the semi-finals of both the UEFA Cup and the Champions League; however, when O'Leary was sacked by Leeds in 2002 Batty found himself out of favour with subsequent managers. He was injured in a game against former club Newcastle United on 7 January 2004; it would turn out to be the final game of his career. He retired from football when he was released by Leeds in May 2004.

== International career ==
Batty's performances for Leeds resulted in him making his England debut under Graham Taylor in the 3–0 win against the Soviet Union in May 1991, aged 22. At the time of the 1998 FIFA World Cup, Batty was an England regular under Glenn Hoddle, but made limited starts in the four matches England competed in and was notable, along with Paul Ince, for missing a penalty against Argentina which prevented the team from advancing to the quarter-finals. In all Batty gained 42 caps, making his final appearance for England in the 0–0 draw with Poland in 1999, where he was sent off in the 84th minute of the game.

== Personal life ==
Since his retirement Batty has featured in 'The Match', in which a team of former professionals faced a team of celebrities in a charity match staged at Newcastle's St James' Park ground.

After retirement, some of Batty's former teammates including Alan Shearer and Jeff Kenna have commented that they did not think Batty really liked football and that he had no real interest in it, only playing the sport because he was good at it. Shearer commented that he never studied the game or watched other games and that he was always the last one into training and the first one to leave, but regardless of this he was a fierce competitor. Following his retirement in 2004, Batty shunned life in the limelight and was living in Yorkshire, is rarely interviewed and rarely attends functions. Due to Batty's life out of the media spotlight, Les Ferdinand recalled rumours that Batty was a Superbike champion under another name or that he was living in a caravan in Filey, but stated: "The reality is a little more mundane: Batty is simply enjoying a low-key retirement with his family in Yorkshire as he always planned to."

== Career statistics ==
=== Club ===
Appearances and goals by club, season and competition
Club	Season	League			FA Cup		League Cup		Europe		Other		Total	
Club	Season	Division	Apps	Goals	Apps	Goals	Apps	Goals	Apps	Goals	Apps	Goals	Apps	Goals
Leeds United	1987–88	Second Division	23	1	1	0	0	0	—		2 (Note: Appearance(s) in Full Members' Cup)	0	26	1
Leeds United	1988–89	Second Division	30	0	1	0	3	0	—		1	0	35	0
Leeds United	1989–90	Second Division	42	0	1	0	2	0	—		4	0	49	0
Leeds United	1990–91	First Division	37	0	6	0	6	0	—		4	0	53	0
Leeds United	1991–92	First Division	40	2	0	0	4	0	—		1	0	45	2
Leeds United	1992–93	Premier League	30	1	3	0	2	0	4 (Note: Appearances in UEFA Champions League)	0	1 (Note: Appearance in FA Charity Shield)	0	40	1
Leeds United	1993–94	Premier League	9	0	—		—		—		—		9	0
Leeds United	Total		211	4	12	0	17	0	4	0	13	0	257	4
Blackburn Rovers	1993–94	Premier League	26	0	4	0	2	0	—		—		32	0
Blackburn Rovers	1994–95	Premier League	5	0	0	0	0	0	0	0	0	0	5	0
Blackburn Rovers	1995–96	Premier League	23	1	1	0	4	0	5	0	1	0	34	1
Blackburn Rovers	Total		54	1	5	0	6	0	5	0	1	0	71	1
Newcastle United	1995–96	Premier League	11	1	—		—		—		—		11	1
Newcastle United	1996–97	Premier League	32	1	3	0	2	0	7 (Note: Appearances in UEFA Cup)	0	1	0	45	1
Newcastle United	1997–98	Premier League	32	1	6	1	2	0	7	0	—		47	2
Newcastle United	1998–99	Premier League	8	0	—		2	0	1 (Note: Appearances in UEFA Cup Winners' Cup)	0	—		11	0
Newcastle United	Total		83	3	9	1	6	0	15	0	1	0	114	4
Leeds United	1998–99	Premier League	10	0	0	0	—		—		—		10	0
Leeds United	1999–2000	Premier League	16	0	0	0	2	0	4	0	—		22	0
Leeds United	2000–01	Premier League	16	0	2	0	0	0	8	0	—		26	0
Leeds United	2001–02	Premier League	36	0	1	0	1	0	6	0	—		44	0
Leeds United	2002–03	Premier League	0	0	0	0	0	0	0	0	—		0	0
Leeds United	2003–04	Premier League	12	0	1	0	1	0	—		—		14	0
Leeds United	Total		90	0	4	0	4	0	18	0	—		116	0
Career total			438	8	30	1	33	0	42	0	15	0	558	9

=== International ===
Appearances and goals by national team and year
National team	Year	Apps	Goals
England	1991	7	0
England	1992	4	0
England	1993	3	0
England	1994	1	0
England	1995	2	0
England	1996	2	0
England	1997	8	0
England	1998	10	0
England	1999	5	0
Total		42	0

== Honours ==
Leeds United

- Football League First Division: 1991–92
- Football League Second Division: 1989–90
- FA Charity Shield: 1992

Newcastle United

- FA Cup runner-up: 1997–98

Blackburn Rovers

- Premier League: 1994–95

Individual

- PFA Team of the Year: 1993–94 Premier League, 1996–97 Premier League, 1997–98 Premier League
- Blackburn Rovers Player of the Year: 1993–94
- Newcastle United Player of the Year: 1997–98
