= Mark Atkins (footballer) =

English footballer and manager

Personal information
- Full name: Mark Nigel Atkins
- Date of birth: 14 August 1968 (age 58)
- Place of birth: Doncaster, England
- Height: 6 ft 1 in (1.85 m)
- Position: Midfielder

Senior career*
Years	Team	Apps	(Gls)
1986–1988	Scunthorpe United	50	(2)
1988–1995	Blackburn Rovers	257	(34)
1995–1999	Wolverhampton Wanderers	126	(8)
1999	York City	10	(2)
1999–2001	Doncaster Rovers	45	(4)
2001	→ Hull City (loan)	8	(0)
2001–2003	Shrewsbury Town	72	(3)
2003–2004	Harrogate Town		

Managerial career
- 2000: Doncaster Rovers (caretaker)
- 2003: Shrewsbury Town (caretaker)
- 2008–2014: Matlock Town
- 2024: Matlock Town
- * Club domestic league appearances and goals

Mark Nigel Atkins (born 14 August 1968) is an English football manager and former professional footballer.

He was primarily a central midfielder but started out as right-back in a career that lasted from 1986 until 2004, notably in the Premier League for Blackburn Rovers where he won the title in 1995. He also played in the Football League for Scunthorpe United, Wolverhampton Wanderers, York City, Doncaster Rovers, Hull City, Shrewsbury Town and Harrogate Town.

Later on his playing career, Atkins was brielfly appointed as caretaker manager at both Doncaster and Shrewsbury, and in 2008 he was appointed as manager of non-league side Matlock Town, a position he held for six years. He returned to Matlock as manager in 2024.

== Playing career ==
Atkins was an integral part of Blackburn's rise from the old Second Division to Premier League champions in 1995. He joined Rovers for £45,000 from Scunthorpe United in 1988, being then relocated to midfielder, and staying in the team despite the big investment in new players from owner Jack Walker.

His part in Blackburn's championship success is often understated. A foot injury kept midfielder David Batty out of the team until the final five matches of the 1994–95 season and Atkins played in 34 matches and scored six goals in the title season, including important ones against Liverpool and Southampton.

Atkins moved on from Blackburn soon after the club's championship success, joining First Division Wolverhampton Wanderers in September 1995 for £1million. He was a first choice player throughout his time at Molineux as the club fought to reach the Premier League. He reached the play-offs with the team in 1996–97 but they lost 3–4 on aggregate to Crystal Palace, despite Atkins scoring in the return leg to give them a 2–1 win.

After four seasons with Wolves, Atkins was released in 1999, joining York City in the fourth tier on a three-month contract. After leaving this expired, he had an unsuccessful trial at Reading, before training with conference side Doncaster Rovers, who subsequently offered him a deal. He remained at Doncaster for the next two seasons, and served as joint caretaker-manager (with Dave Penney) for the final five fixtures of the 1999–2000 campaign after the dismissal of Ian Snodin.

Atkins returned to a purely playing role during the next season, which ended with him being loaned out to Hull City for the run-in. He helped the club reach the Third Division play-offs, but was denied a Wembley final by Leyton Orient's 2–1 aggregate triumph.

He joined Shrewsbury Town in July 2001, enjoying a decent ninth-placed finish to his first season at Gay Meadow. The 2002–03 season was one of mixed fortunes for the Shrews, from the highs of runs to the fourth round of the FA Cup and area final of the Football League Trophy to the lows of seven successive defeats, resulting in relegation to the conference.

== Coaching and management career ==
Shrewsbury manager Kevin Ratcliffe resigned with one game remaining of the season, and Atkins took charge of the team as they attempted to restore some pride in a home encounter against his original club Scunthorpe United. However, Shrewsbury succumbed to a 2–1 defeat, and Atkins left at the end of the season. He continued his playing career for one more season, at non-league level with Harrogate Town, also serving as their coach, before retiring as a player in 2004.

Atkins remained assistant manager at Harrogate, but both he and manager John Reed left for Stalybridge Celtic in January 2005, from where they were later dismissed in April 2007. Atkins was appointed manager at Northern Premier League club Matlock Town on 18 November 2008. He resigned along with assistant Nick Buxton on 4 October 2014 after a 4–0 defeat to Halesowen Town left Matlock Town joint bottom of the league.

Atkins returned to Matlock as manager in March 2024.

He is now a pundit for BBC Radio Lancashire.

== Honours ==
Blackburn Rovers

- Premier League: 1994–95
- Football League Second Division play-offs: 1992
