= Jason Wilcox =

English footballer and executive (born 1971)

Personal information
- Full name: Jason Malcolm Wilcox
- Date of birth: 15 July 1971 (age 55)
- Place of birth: Bolton, England
- Height: 5 ft 11 in (1.80 m)
- Position: Left winger

Team information
- Current team: Manchester United (Director of Football)

Youth career
- 1987–1989: Blackburn Rovers

Senior career*
Years	Team	Apps	(Gls)
1989–1999	Blackburn Rovers	271	(31)
1999–2004	Leeds United	81	(4)
2004–2006	Leicester City	20	(1)
2005–2006	→ Blackpool (loan)	12	(0)
2006	Blackpool	14	(0)
Total		398	(36)

International career
1994–1998	England B	2	(0)
1996–2000	England	3	(0)
- * Club domestic league appearances and goals

Jason Malcolm Wilcox (born 15 July 1971) is an English football executive and former professional player who is currently serving as the Director of Football at Premier League club Manchester United.

As a player, Wilcox was a left winger from 1989 until 2006, notably in the Premier League for Blackburn Rovers, where he won the title in 1995. He also played in the top flight for Leeds United and in the Championship for Leicester City. He retired following a brief stint in the Football League with Blackpool. He made three appearances for England.

After retiring from football, Wilcox was a co-commentator for BBC Radio Lancashire before moving into coaching with Manchester City in 2012. He went on to become the academy director at the club, a post he held until 2023 when he joined Southampton. He left Southampton in April 2024 to join Manchester United.

== Early life ==
Jason Malcolm Wilcox was born in Farnworth, Lancashire.

== Club career ==
=== Blackburn Rovers ===
Wilcox joined Blackburn Rovers at the age of sixteen after his father wrote to the club asking for a trial. After impressing at training on Sunday, Wilcox signed a contract on the Monday, before playing in the FA Youth Cup final only weeks after. Rovers youth-team manager Jim Furnell described him as "one of the best young midfielders in English football".

Wilcox would go on to score 33 goals in over 300 games with Blackburn. He played an important part in the title-winning Blackburn team of 1995. Playing on the left flank with attacking fullback Graeme Le Saux behind him and Stuart Ripley on the opposite flank, they forged a strong attacking line-up with Alan Shearer and Chris Sutton.

Lengthy injury problems restricted Wilcox's effectiveness in subsequent seasons and, after experiencing relegation with Blackburn, he moved on to Leeds United for £4 million in December 1999. With the club having just been relegated and with the emergence of winger Damien Duff, Blackburn viewed the sale of Wilcox as good business for a successful youth product. He was Blackburn's longest-serving player at the time of joining Leeds.

=== Leeds United ===
Wilcox, who scored on his debut, played in his usual position as a left-sided midfielder at Leeds, moving Harry Kewell into a more advanced role. He helped the Yorkshire side to the semi-finals of the 1999–2000 UEFA Cup, where they lost to eventual winners, Galatasaray. A year later he was part of the club's run to the UEFA Champions League semi-finals, where they lost again, this time to eventually consecutive runners-up Valencia.

Wilcox again suffered relegation, in 2004, as Leeds struggled with a large financial burden after failing to qualify for the Champions League, forcing the sale of several high-profile stars. He was released by Leeds in May 2004. Overall, he made 106 appearances for Leeds, scoring six goals.

=== Leicester City ===
In 2004, Wilcox signed on a free transfer with fellow relegated club Leicester on a one-year deal. He initially signed a one-year deal which was extended by another year in the summer of 2005. Wilcox made a positive start to his Leicester career, but suffered a cruciate ligament injury in October 2004. It was feared it would end his season and possibly his career, but he returned in City's 3–1 win over Millwall on 2 April 2005. He scored once for Leicester, in a 3–2 win over Sheffield United in September 2004. In May 2005, he signed a new one-year contract with Leicester. In November 2005, he joined Blackpool on a one-month loan.

=== Blackpool ===
On 28 January 2006, Wilcox joined Blackpool on a free transfer following a two-month spell on loan to the club, after his former Blackburn teammate Simon Grayson requested Wilcox join the club to help save them from relegation. He was released at the end of the season.

== International career ==
Wilcox won his first England cap in a 3–0 win over Hungary in 1996. However, he was not included in the final squad of 22 players for Euro 96 in what Terry Venables described as one of the toughest decisions of his career. Wilcox went on to play against France in 1999 and Argentina in 2000; these turned out to be his only other full caps. Wilcox made the provisional squad for Euro 2000 but was replaced by Gareth Barry after an injury. He also made two appearances for the B team, against Chile and Hong Kong.

== Coaching career ==
=== Manchester City ===
Wilcox joined the Manchester City coaching staff in 2012 as an academy coach, a year later he made the step up to the U18s as their head coach and oversaw a national championship title and two FA Youth Cup finals. In 2017 after a spell in the job on an interim basis he was appointed to the role of academy director.

== Executive roles ==
=== Southampton ===
On 20 January 2023, Wilcox was appointed director of football at Southampton. Wilcox joined Southampton in the summer after serving a notice period with City.

=== Manchester United ===
He left Southampton and was appointed technical director at Manchester United on 19 April 2024 after both clubs agreed compensation.

When Dan Ashworth left Manchester United on 8 December 2024, Wilcox assumed his responsibilities as sporting director. On 4 June 2025, Wilcox was promoted to Director of Football for Manchester United, replacing Dave Brailsford.

== Personal life ==
Wilcox is a black belt in judo and represented England before he became a professional footballer. When he reached the age of seventeen he fully committed himself to football.

After retiring from football, Wilcox took some time out from the game before joining the commentary staff of BBC Radio Lancashire for a year, as well as having his own weekly column in the Lancashire Telegraph.

== Honours ==
Blackburn Rovers

- Premier League: 1994–95
