= 1990–91 Norwich City F.C. season =

Norwich City
1990–91 season
- Chairman: Robert Chase
- Manager: Dave Stringer
- Stadium: Carrow Road
- First Division: 15th
- FA Cup: Quarter finals
- League Cup: Third round
- Full Members Cup: Southern final
- Player of the Year: Ian Culverhouse
- Top goalscorer: Gordon/Sherwood (7)
- Average home league attendance: 15,468

During the 1990–91 English football season, Norwich City F.C. competed in the Football League First Division.

== Season summary ==
In the 1990–91 season, Norwich had a good run in the FA Cup, which includes a 'live TV' win over Manchester United, ends with a 1–0 home defeat to Nottingham Forest in the quarter finals. The Canaries also reached the Southern Area final of the Full Members Cup before losing to Crystal Palace over two legs. In the league, Norwich finished in a disappointing 15th place, but weren't in relegation danger for much of the season. Youngsters that made their mark that season included Daryl Sutch, Chris Sutton and Robert Ullathorne.

== Final league table ==
Pos	Team	Pld	W	D	L	GF	GA	GD	Pts
13	Sheffield United	38	13	7	18	36	55	−19	46
14	Southampton	38	12	9	17	58	69	−11	45
15	Norwich City	38	13	6	19	41	64	−23	45
16	Coventry City	38	11	11	16	42	49	−7	44
17	Aston Villa	38	9	14	15	46	58	−12	41

Source: World Football
Rules for classification: 1) Points; 2) Goal difference; 3) Goals scored

== Results ==
Results summary

Overall								Home						Away					
Pld	W	D	L	GF	GA	GD	Pts	W	D	L	GF	GA	GD	W	D	L	GF	GA	GD
38	13	6	19	41	64	−23	45	9	3	7	27	32	−5	4	3	12	14	32	−18

Source: Statto

Results by round

Round	1	2	3	4	5	6	7	8	9	10	11	12	13	14	15	16	17	18	19	20	21	22	23	24	25	26	27	28	29	30	31	32	33	34	35	36	37	38
Ground	H	A	A	H	A	H	H	A	H	A	H	A	H	A	H	H	A	H	A	A	H	H	A	H	A	A	A	H	H	A	H	H	H	A	A	H	A	A
Result	W	L	L	L	L	W	L	L	D	W	W	D	W	L	L	W	W	W	L	L	L	W	W	L	D	D	W	D	L	L	D	W	L	L	L	W	L	L
Position	5	8	15	17	17	16	17	17	17	16	12	12	9	11	13	10	10	9	9	9	11	11	10	10	10	10	10	10	11	13	13	10	13	15	16	13	13	15

Source: Statto.com
A = Away; H = Home; W = Win; D = Draw; L = Loss

=== First Division ===
25 August 1990 1	Norwich City	3–2	Sunderland	Norwich
	Gordon 9'; Sherwood 43'; Fox 71'		Davenport 54'; Gabbiadini 63'	Stadium: Carrow Road; Attendance: 17,247

28 August 1990 2	Southampton	1–0	Norwich City	Southampton
	Polston 63' (o.g.)			Stadium: The Dell; Attendance: 17,206

1 September 1990 3	Leeds United	3–0	Norwich City	Leeds
	Chapman 6', 35'; Varadi 78'			Stadium: Elland Road; Attendance: 25,684

8 September 1990 4	Norwich City	0–3	Crystal Palace	Norwich
			Barber 7'; Wright 13'; Salako 55'	Stadium: Carrow Road; Attendance: 15,306

15 September 1990 5	Manchester City	2–1	Norwich City	Manchester
	Quinn 22'; Brennan 27'		Fleck 77'	Stadium: Maine Road; Attendance: 26,247

22 September 1990 6	Norwich City	2–1	Derby County	Norwich
	Phillips 58'; Fox 62'		Patterson 62'	Stadium: Carrow Road; Attendance: 13,258

29 September 1990 7	Norwich City	1–3	Luton Town	Norwich
	Gordon 5'		Elstrup 48', 53', 62'	Stadium: Carrow Road; Attendance: 12,794

6 October 1990 8	Arsenal	2–0	Norwich City	London
	Davis 28', 32'			Stadium: Highbury; Attendance: 36,048

20 October 1990 9	Norwich City	1–1	Liverpool	Norwich
	Fox 7'		Gillespie 2'	Stadium: Carrow Road; Attendance: 21,275

27 October 1990 10	Queens Park Rangers	1–3	Norwich City	London
	Wegerle 59' (pen.)		Power 15', 69'; Phillips 39'	Stadium: Loftus Road; Attendance: 11,103

3 November 1990 11	Norwich City	3–0	Sheffield United	Norwich
	Sherwood 30'; Jones 51' (o.g.); Phillips 75'			Stadium: Carrow Road; Attendance: 14,806

10 November 1990 12	Chelsea	1–1	Norwich City	London
	Wise 26' (pen.)		Gordon 13'	Stadium: Stamford Bridge; Attendance: 16,925

17 November 1990 13	Norwich City	2–0	Aston Villa	Norwich
	Crook 4'; Fox 70'			Stadium: Carrow Road; Attendance: 17,243

24 November 1990 14	Tottenham Hotspur	2–1	Norwich City	London
	Lineker 29', 51'		Crook 32'	Stadium: White Hart Lane; Attendance: 33,942

1 December 1990 15	Norwich City	0–4	Wimbledon	Norwich
			Fashanu 1', 28'; Barton 19'; Scales 21'	Stadium: Carrow Road; Attendance: 12,324

8 December 1990 16	Norwich City	3–1	Southampton	Norwich
	Phillips 36'; Ruddock 53' (o.g.); Bowen 55'		Le Tissier 5'	Stadium: Carrow Road; Attendance: 11,705

15 December 1990 17	Sunderland	1–2	Norwich City	Sunderland
	Armstrong 14'		Sherwood 60'; Gordon 75'	Stadium: Roker Park; Attendance: 18,693

22 December 1990 18	Norwich City	1–0	Everton	Norwich
	Polston 37'			Stadium: Carrow Road; Attendance: 14,294

26 December 1990 19	Manchester United	3–0	Norwich City	Manchester
	Hughes 54'; McClair 69', 89'			Stadium: Old Trafford; Attendance: 39,801

29 December 1990 20	Coventry City	2–0	Norwich City	Coventry
	Borrows 56' (pen.); Speedie 58'			Stadium: Highfield Road; Attendance: 12,039

2 January 1991 21	Norwich City	2–6	Nottingham Forest	Norwich
	Sherwood 10'; Fleck 71'		Wilson 26'; Clough 26'; Polston 53' (o.g.); Keane 68', 77'; Crosby 86'	Stadium: Carrow Road; Attendance: 17,043

12 January 1991 22	Norwich City	2–0	Leeds United	Norwich
	Sherwood 17'; Gordon 73'			Stadium: Carrow Road; Attendance: 17,786

19 January 1991 23	Crystal Palace	1–3	Norwich City	London
	Bright 53'		Goss 19'; Fleck 58', 73'	Stadium: Selhurst Park; Attendance: 17,201

2 February 1991 24	Norwich City	1–2	Manchester City	Norwich
	Polston 80'		Quinn 2'; White 43'	Stadium: Carrow Road; Attendance: 15,194

23 February 1991 25	Derby County	0–0	Norwich City	Derby
				Stadium: Baseball Ground; Attendance: 14,102

2 March 1991 26	Wimbledon	0–0	Norwich City	London
				Stadium: Plough Lane; Attendance: 4,041

16 March 1991 27	Luton Town	0–1	Norwich City	Luton
			Sherwood 21'	Stadium: Kenilworth Road; Attendance: 8,604

23 March 1991 28	Norwich City	0–0	Arsenal	Norwich
				Stadium: Carrow Road; Attendance: 20,131

30 March 1991 29	Norwich City	0–3	Manchester United	Norwich
			Bruce 18' (pen.), 74'} Ince 80'	Stadium: Carrow Road; Attendance: 18,282

1 April 1991 30	Everton	1–0	Norwich City	Liverpool
	Newell 62'			Stadium: Goodison Park; Attendance: 20,485

6 April 1991 31	Norwich City	2–2	Coventry City	Norwich
	Sherwood 41'; Fleck 48'		Gallacher 29'} Gynn 60'	Stadium: Carrow Road; Attendance: 11,550

10 April 1991 32	Norwich City	2–1	Tottenham Hotspur	Norwich
	Power 13'; Crook 81'		Hendry 44'	Stadium: Carrow Road; Attendance: 19,014

16 April 1991 33	Norwich City	1–3	Chelsea	Norwich
	Polston 79'		Wise 18'; Durie 38', 65'	Stadium: Carrow Road; Attendance: 12,301

20 April 1991 34	Liverpool	3–0	Norwich City	Liverpool
	Barnes 31'; Houghton 36'; Rush 85'			Stadium: Anfield; Attendance: 37,605

24 April 1991 35	Nottingham Forest	5–0	Norwich City	Nottingham
	Glover 18'; Clough 35'; Pearce 58'; Crosby 65'; Woan 88'			Stadium: City Ground; Attendance: 17,641

4 May 1991 36	Norwich City	1–0	Queens Park Rangers	Norwich
	Gordon 50'			Stadium: Carrow Road; Attendance: 13,469

8 May 1991 37	Aston Villa	2–1	Norwich City	Birmingham
	Bowen 9' (o.g.); Yorke 66'		Gordon 42'	Stadium: Villa Park; Attendance: 16,697

11 May 1991 38	Sheffield United	2–1	Norwich City	Sheffield
	Agana 12', 18'		Polston 10'	Stadium: Bramall Lane; Attendance: 21,019

=== FA Cup ===
5 January 1991 Round 3	Norwich City	2–1	Bristol City	Norwich
				Stadium: Carrow Road

26 January 1991 Round 4	Norwich City	3–1	Swindon Town	Norwich
				Stadium: Carrow Road

18 February 1991 Round 5	Norwich City	2–1	Manchester United	Norwich
				Stadium: Carrow Road; Attendance: 23,058

9 March 1991 Quarter Final	Norwich City	0–1	Nottingham Forest	Norwich
				Stadium: Carrow Road

=== League Cup ===
26 September 1990 Round 2 Leg 1	Norwich City	2–0	Watford	Norwich
				Stadium: Carrow Road; Attendance: 7,720

9 October 1990 Round 2 Leg 2	Watford	0–3 (0–5 agg.)	Norwich City	Norwich
				Stadium: Carrow Road; Attendance: 6,148

30 October 1990 Round 3	Middlesbrough	2–0	Norwich City	Middlesbrough
				Stadium: Ayresome Park; Attendance: 17,024

=== Full Members' Cup ===
19 December 1990 Southern Section Round 2	Norwich City	1–1 (a.e.t.) (6–5 p)	Millwall	Norwich
				Stadium: Carrow Road; Attendance: 4,741

20 February 1991 Southern Section Quarter Final	Norwich City	2–1	Southampton	Norwich
				Stadium: Carrow Road; Attendance: 5,920

27 February 1991 Southern Section Semi Final	Norwich City	2–0	Ipswich Town	Norwich
				Stadium: Carrow Road; Attendance: 16,225

5 March 1991 Southern Section Final First Leg	Norwich City	1–1	Crystal Palace	Norwich
				Stadium: Carrow Road; Attendance: 7,554

19 March 1991 Southern Section Final Second Leg	Crystal Palace	2–0 (3–1 agg.)	Norwich City	London
				Stadium: Selhurst Park; Attendance: 13,857

== Squad ==
Note: Flags indicate national team as defined under FIFA eligibility rules; some limited exceptions apply. Players may hold more than one non-FIFA nationality.

Pos.	Nation	Player
GK	SCO	Bryan Gunn
GK	ENG	Jon Sheffield
GK	WAL	Mark Walton
DF	ENG	Paul Blades
DF	WAL	Mark Bowen
DF	ENG	Ian Butterworth
DF	ENG	Ian Culverhouse
DF	ENG	Jason Minett
DF	ENG	Adrian Pennock
DF	ENG	John Polston
DF	ENG	Daryl Sutch
DF	ENG	Robert Ullathorne
DF	ENG	Colin Woodthorpe
MF	ENG	Steve Ball

Pos.	Nation	Player
MF	ENG	Ian Crook
MF	MSR	Ruel Fox
MF	ENG	Dale Gordon
MF	WAL	Jeremy Goss
MF	WAL	David Phillips
MF	ENG	Tim Sherwood
MF	ENG	David Smith
FW	SCO	Robert Fleck
FW	DEN	Henrik Mortensen
FW	IRL	Lee Power
FW	ENG	Robert Rosario
FW	ENG	Chris Sutton
FW	ENG	Robert Taylor

== Transfers ==
=== In ===
Date	Pos	Name	To	Fee
17 July 1990	DF	Colin Woodthorpe	Chester City	£175,000
18 July 1990	DF	Paul Blades	Derby County	£700,000
24 July 1990	DF	John Polston	Tottenham Hotspur	£250,000
18 September 1990	MF	Steve Ball	Colchester United	Free transfer

=== Out ===
Date	Pos	Name	To	Fee
4 July 1990	DF	Andy Linighan	Arsenal	£1,250,000
5 July 1990	MF	Andy Townsend	Chelsea	£1,200,000
18 March 1991	GK	Jon Sheffield	Cambridge United	Free transfer
22 March 1991	FW	Robert Rosario	Coventry City	£600,000

Transfers in: ▼£1,125,000
Transfers out: ▲£2,050,000
Total spending: ▲£925,000
