= 1988–89 Norwich City F.C. season =

Norwich City
1988–89 season
- Manager: Dave Stringer
- Stadium: Carrow Road
- First Division: 4th
- FA Cup: Semi-final
- League Cup: Third round
- Top goalscorer: League: Robert Fleck; All: Robert Fleck (15)
Home colours

During the 1988–89 English football season, Norwich City competed in the Football League First Division.

== Season summary ==
Norwich were tipped by many to struggle during the season, but shocked the rest of the First Division by going top in September; by the end of October, they held a six-point lead over Arsenal, having played a game more. The lead at the top was maintained until December, finished the season in fourth – until 1993, this was their highest ever league placing. They also reached the semi-finals of the FA Cup, losing to Everton, which had made them unlikely contenders for the double of the league title and FA Cup this season – an accolade which had only previously been achieved five times in a whole century of league football in England.

Norwich's fourth place in the league saw them finish only behind champions Arsenal, runners-up Liverpool and third placed Nottingham Forest. They finished above a number of higher-spending and traditionally better-supported and more successful clubs including Everton, Manchester United and relegated Newcastle United.

Stars of the season included goalkeeper Bryan Gunn, defender Andy Linighan, midfielder Mike Phelan, winger Dale Gordon and striker Robert Fleck. However, it was the last season at Carrow Road for Phelan, who was then sold to Manchester United.

== Squad ==
Squad at end of season

Note: Flags indicate national team as defined under FIFA eligibility rules; some limited exceptions apply. Players may hold more than one non-FIFA nationality.

Pos.	Nation	Player
GK	SCO	Bryan Gunn
DF	ENG	Ian Butterworth (vice-captain)
DF	ENG	Ian Culverhouse
DF	ENG	Andy Linighan
DF	WAL	Mark Bowen
MF	ENG	Paul Cook
MF	ENG	Ian Crook
MF	ENG	Ruel Fox
MF	ENG	Dale Gordon

Pos.	Nation	Player
MF	ENG	Mike Phelan (captain)
MF	ENG	Trevor Putney
MF	WAL	Jeremy Goss
MF	IRL	Andy Townsend
FW	ENG	Robert Rosario
FW	WAL	Malcolm Allen
FW	SCO	Robert Fleck
FW	ENG	Dean Coney
GK	ENG	Jon Sheffield

=== Left club during season ===
Note: Flags indicate national team as defined under FIFA eligibility rules; some limited exceptions apply. Players may hold more than one non-FIFA nationality.

Pos.	Nation	Player
FW	ENG	Alan Taylor (retired)

=== Youth team ===
Note: Flags indicate national team as defined under FIFA eligibility rules; some limited exceptions apply. Players may hold more than one non-FIFA nationality.

Pos.	Nation	Player
GK	ENG	Nick Brown
GK	NZL	Jason Batty
DF	ENG	Daryl Sutch
DF	ENG	Adrian Pennock
DF	ENG	Robert Ullathorne

Pos.	Nation	Player
DF	ENG	Jason Minett
MF	ENG	David Smith
FW	ENG	Robert Taylor
FW	ENG	Lee Power

== Transfers ==
=== In ===
- Andy Townsend – Southampton, £300,000, 31 August 1988
- Malcolm Allen - Watford, £175,000
- Paul Cook - Wigan Athletic, £73,000
- Dean Coney - QPR, £350,000
- Mike Flynn, Oldham Athletic, £100,000

=== Out ===
- Kevin Drinkell – Rangers, £500,000
- Wayne Biggins - Man City, £160,000
- Tony Spearing - Leicester City, £100,000
- Kenny Brown – Plymouth Argyle

== Final league table ==
Pos	Team	Pld	W	D	L	GF	GA	GD	Pts	Qualification or relegation
2	Liverpool (Note: Liverpool would have qualified as FA Cup winners.)	38	22	10	6	65	28	+37	76	Disqualified from the European Cup Winners' Cup
3	Nottingham Forest (Note: Nottingham Forest would have qualified as League Cup winners.)	38	17	13	8	64	43	+21	64	Disqualified from the UEFA Cup
4	Norwich City	38	17	11	10	48	45	+3	62	Disqualified from the UEFA Cup
5	Derby County	38	17	7	14	40	38	+2	58	
6	Tottenham Hotspur	38	15	12	11	60	46	+14	57	

Source: World Football
Rules for classification: 1) Points; 2) Goal difference; 3) Goals scored

== Results ==
=== First Division ===
27 August 1988	Norwich City	2–1	Nottingham Forest	Norwich
	Fleck 13'; Bowen 15'		Chettle	Stadium: Carrow Road

3 September 1988	Middlesbrough	2–3	Norwich City	Middlesbrough
	Mowbray; Burke		Rosario; Fleck	Stadium: Ayresome Park

10 September 1988	Norwich City	1–0	Queen's Park Rangers	Norwich
	Mike Phelan			Stadium: Carrow Road

17 September 1988	Newcastle United	0–2	Norwich City	Newcastle-upon-Tyne
			Fleck	Stadium: St James' Park

24 September 1988	Norwich City	2–2	Millwall	Norwich
	Crook; Rosario		Cascarino; O'Callaghan	Stadium: Carrow Road

1 October 1988	Norwich City	1–3	Charlton Athletic	Norwich
	Linighan		Williams; Mortimer	Stadium: Carrow Road

8 October 1988	Derby County	0–1	Norwich City	Derby
			Wright o.g.'	Stadium: Baseball Ground

22 October 1988	Norwich City	3–1	Tottenham Hotspur	Norwich
	Rosario; Robert Fleck; Andy Linighan		Fairclough	Stadium: Carrow Road

26 October 1988	Manchester United	1–2	Norwich City	Manchester
	Hughes 59'		Phelan 85'; Townsend 86'	Stadium: Old Trafford

29 October 1988	Norwich City	1–1	Southampton	Norwich
	Fleck		Danny Wallace	Stadium: Carrow Road

5 November 1988	Wimbledon	0–2	Norwich City
			Andy Linighan; Malcolm Allen

12 November 1988	Norwich City	1–1	Sheffield Wednesday	Norwich
	Trevor Putney		Mel Sterland	Stadium: Carrow Road

19 November 1988	Everton	1–1	Norwich City
	Steven 74' (pen.)		Allen 62'	Referee: John Penrose

26 November 1988	Norwich City	2–2	Luton Town	Norwich
	Own Goal; Dale Gordon		Wegerle	Stadium: Carrow Road

3 December 1988	Aston Villa	3–1	Norwich City
	Kevin Gage; David Platt		Trevor Putney

10 December 1988	Norwich City	0–0	Arsenal	Norwich
				Stadium: Carrow Road

17 December 1988	Liverpool	0–1	Norwich City
			Andy Townsend

27 December 1988	Norwich City	2–1	West Ham United	Norwich
	Dale Gordon 53'; Andy Townsend 60'		Ray Stewart 71' (pen.)	Stadium: Carrow Road

31 December 1988	Norwich City	0–0	Middlesbrough	Norwich
				Stadium: Carrow Road

2 January 1989	Queen's Park Rangers	1–1	Norwich City	London
	Marc Falco		Alan Taylor	Stadium: Loftus Road

14 January 1989	Norwich City	1–2	Coventry City	Norwich
	Dale Gordon		David Speedie 90'	Stadium: Carrow Road

22 January 1989	Millwall	2–3	Norwich City
	Cascarino 11'; Carter 42'		Butterworth 2'; Bowen 7'; Fleck 90'

4 February 1989	Charlton Athletic	2–1	Norwich City	Selhurst Park
	Garth Crooks		Malcolm Allen; Andy Townsend

11 February 1989	Norwich City	1–0	Derby County	Norwich
	Robert Fleck			Stadium: Carrow Road

21 February 1989	Tottenham Hotspur	2–1	Norwich City
	Paul Gascoigne; Chris Waddle		Trevor Putney

25 February 1989	Norwich City	2–1	Manchester United	Norwich
	Butterworth; Malcolm Allen		Paul McGrath	Stadium: Carrow Road

11 March 1989	Norwich City	1–0	Wimbledon	Norwich
	Trevor Putney			Stadium: Carrow Road

25 March 1989	Norwich City	0–2	Newcastle United	Norwich
			Mirandinha; Liam O'Brian	Stadium: Carrow Road

27 March 1989	West Ham United	0–2	Norwich City
			Andy Linighan; Malcolm Allen 86'

1 April 1989	Norwich City	0–1	Liverpool	Norwich
			Ronnie Whelan	Stadium: Carrow Road

5 April 1989	Nottingham Forest	2–0	Norwich City	Nottingham
	Nigel Clough; Stuart Pearce			Stadium: City Ground

8 April 1989	Coventry City	2–1	Norwich City
	David Phillips 24'; David Speedie		Robert Fleck

19 April 1989	Southampton	0–0	Norwich City	Southampton
				Stadium: The Dell

22 April 1989	Norwich City	2–2	Aston Villa	Norwich
	Dean Coney; Andy Townsend		Ian Olny; McInally	Stadium: Carrow Road

1 May 1989	Arsenal	5–0	Norwich City	London
	Nigel Winterburn; Alan Smith; Micheal Thomas; Alan Smith; Paul Rocastle			Stadium: Highbury

6 May 1989	Norwich City	1–0	Everton	Norwich
	Dale Gordon			Stadium: Carrow Road

13 May 1989	Luton Town	1–0	Norwich City
	Danny Wilson pen.'

17 May 1989	Sheffield Wednesday	2–2	Norwich City	Sheffield
	Own Goal; Reeves		Robert Rosario; Fleck	Stadium: Hillsborough

=== League Cup ===
28 September 1988	Norwich City	2–0	Preston North End	Norwich
	Rosario; Ian Crook			Stadium: Carrow Road

11 October 1988	Preston North End	0–3	Norwich City
			Fleck; Gordon; Rosario

2 November 1988	Leicester City	2–0	Norwich City

=== FA Cup ===
8 January 1989	Port Vale	1–3	Norwich City
	Webb		Townsend; Fleck

28 January 1989	Norwich City	8–0	Sutton United	Norwich
	Putney 14'; Allen (4) 16', 46', 73', ?'; Fleck (3) ?', ?', ?'			Stadium: Carrow Road

18 February 1989	Norwich City	3–2	Sheffield United	Norwich
	Thompson (o.g.); Allen (pen); Gordon		Deane; Agana	Stadium: Carrow Road

18 March 1989	West Ham United	0–0	Norwich City

22 March 1989	Norwich City	3–1	West Ham United	Norwich
	Malcolm Allen (2) 25', 27; Gordon 86'		Ince 75'	Stadium: Carrow Road

15 April 1989	Everton	1–0	Norwich City	Birmingham
			Nevin 26'	Stadium: Villa Park

== Awards ==
- Barry Butler Memorial Trophy for Norwich City F.C. Player of the Year: Dale Gordon
