= 1987–88 Norwich City F.C. season =

Norwich City
1987–88 season
- Chairman: Robert Chase
- Manager: Ken Brown (until 9 November); Dave Stringer (from 9 November)
- Stadium: Carrow Road
- First Division: 14th
- FA Cup: Third round
- League Cup: Third round
- Full Members Cup: Fourth round
- Player of the Year: Bryan Gunn
- Top goalscorer: League: Kevin Drinkell (12); All: Kevin Drinkell (12)
- Highest home attendance: 22,509 v Liverpool
- Lowest home attendance: 11,872 v Wimbledon
- Average home league attendance: 15,759
Home colours	Away colours

For the 1987–88 season, Norwich City F.C. competed in Football League Division One, as well as the FA Cup, Littlewoods Cup and Simod Cup.

== Overview ==
The previous season had seen Norwich finish fifth in Division One, their highest position to that date, but any hope of a repeat was quickly dashed. By the beginning of November, Norwich had only registered three league wins, and would soon after slip to bottom of the table after only winning one point from five matches. Chairman Robert Chase took drastic action: On 9 November, long-serving manager Ken Brown was sacked. Dave Stringer, who had only become his assistant at the start of the year after previously being reserve team manager, was appointed as his replacement, initially on a caretaker basis and later permanent. Veteran player David Williams was made a player/coach as his assistant.

The trend was not immediately reversed and in December club captain Steve Bruce left the club for Manchester United. His vice-captain Mike Phelan replaced him as captain. With the money from the sale, Norwich acquired Robert Fleck, who would contribute seven goals in the second half of the season and be the club's leading scorer for the next four seasons, as well as buying Andy Linighan as a replacement for Bruce at centre-half. One of the most unfortunate incidents of the year surrounded John O'Neill, who signed for the club in December only to suffer a career-ending knee injury on his debut, after which he never played professionally again.

Norwich made early exits from all three cup competitions but six wins and six draws in the latter half of the season were enough to secure them another season in the top flight as they finished in 14th place, four places and three points clear of the relegation play-offs. Their biggest win of the season was 4–1 against West Ham United and their heaviest defeat was 3–0, which occurred four times. Their highest scoring game was 4–2 which happened twice, a defeat to Arsenal and a victory over Oxford United.

== Squad ==
Squad at the end of season (7 May 1988)

Note: Flags indicate national team as defined under FIFA eligibility rules; some limited exceptions apply. Players may hold more than one non-FIFA nationality.

Pos.	Nation	Player
GK	SCO	Bryan Gunn
GK	ENG	Graham Benstead
GK	ENG	Jon Sheffield
DF	ENG	Ian Culverhouse
DF	ENG	Tony Spearing
DF	ENG	Ian Butterworth (vice-captain)
DF	ENG	Andy Linighan
DF	ENG	Shaun Elliott
DF	ENG	Simon Ratcliffe
DF	ENG	Kenny Brown
DF	NIR	John O'Neill
DF	ENG	Andy Fensome

Pos.	Nation	Player
MF	ENG	Mike Phelan (captain)
MF	WAL	Mark Bowen
MF	ENG	Trevor Putney
MF	ENG	Ruel Fox
MF	ENG	Ian Crook
MF	ENG	Dale Gordon
MF	ENG	Jeremy Goss
MF	WAL	David Williams
FW	ENG	Kevin Drinkell
FW	SCO	Robert Fleck
FW	ENG	Wayne Biggins
FW	ENG	Robert Rosario

== Transfers ==
=== In ===
Date	Pos	Name	From	Fee	Reference
16 June 1987	DF	Simon Ratcliffe	Manchester United	£40,000	
23 July 1987	MF	Mark Bowen	Tottenham Hotspur	£90,000	
23 July 1987	DF	Paul Wilson	Huddersfield Town	£30,000	
16 December 1987	DF	John O'Neill	Queens Park Rangers	Unknown	
17 December 1987	FW	Robert Fleck	Rangers	£580,000	
4 March 1988	DF	Andy Linighan	Oldham Athletic	£350,000	

=== Out ===
Date	Pos	Name	To	Fee	Reference
1 June 1987	MF	Peter Mendham	King's Lynn	Free	
3 July 1987	FW	Mark Barham	Huddersfield Town	£100,000	
July 1987	FW	David Hodgson	Jerez Club de Portivo	Unknown	
18 December 1987	DF	Steve Bruce	Manchester United	£900,000	
December 1987	MF	Garry Brooke	Groningen	Unknown	
4 March 1988	FW	Paul Clayton	Darlington	£25,000	
29 March 1988	DF	Phil Chapple	Cambridge United	Free	

== Final table ==
Pos	Team	Pld	W	D	L	GF	GA	GD	Pts
12	Southampton	40	12	14	14	49	53	−4	50
13	Tottenham Hotspur	40	12	11	17	38	48	−10	47
14	Norwich City	40	12	9	19	40	52	−12	45
15	Derby County	40	10	13	17	35	45	−10	43
16	West Ham United	40	9	15	16	40	52	−12	42

Rules for classification: 1) Points; 2) Goal difference; 3) Goals scored

== Results ==
=== Division One ===
15 August 1987 1	Everton	1–0	Norwich City	Liverpool
	Power 35'			Stadium: Goodison Park; Attendance: 31,728; Referee: G. Tyson

19 August 1987 2	Norwich City	0–1	Southampton	Norwich
			Moore 61'	Stadium: Carrow Road; Attendance: 14,429; Referee: K. Hackett

22 August 1987 3	Norwich City	3–1	Coventry City	Norwich
	Bruce 20'; Drinkell 54' 84'		Kilcline 58' (pen.)	Stadium: Carrow Road; Attendance: 13,726; Referee: A. Buksh

29 August 1987 4	West Ham United	2–0	Norwich City	London
	Cottee 51' 65'			Stadium: Upton Park; Attendance: 16,394; Referee: M. Reed

1 September 1987 5	Norwich City	1–1	Newcastle United	Norwich
	Biggins 73'		D. Jackson 76'	Stadium: Carrow Road; Attendance: 16,636; Referee: B. Hill

5 September 1987 6	Watford	0–1	Norwich City	Watford
			Bruce 48'	Stadium: Vicarage Road; Attendance: 11,724; Referee: L. Shapter

12 September 1987 7	Norwich City	1–2	Derby County	Norwich
	Rosario 78'		Davison 50'; Gregory 67' (pen.)	Stadium: Carrow Road; Attendance: 14,402; Referee: D. Hedges

19 September 1987 8	Chelsea	1–0	Norwich City	London
	Dixon 4'			Stadium: Stamford Bridge; Attendance: 15,242; Referee: J. Martin

26 September 1987 9	Norwich City	0–2	Nottingham Forest	Norwich
			Webb 28' 31'	Stadium: Carrow Road; Attendance: 13,755; Referee: P. Don

3 October 1987 10	Oxford United	3–0	Norwich City	Oxford
	Slatter 14'; Hill 57'; Foyle 68'			Stadium: Manor Ground; Attendance: 6,847; Referee: A. Gunn

10 October 1987 11	Norwich City	2–1	Tottenham Hotspur	Norwich
	Drinkell 23'; Biggins 63'		Claesen 34'	Stadium: Carrow Road; Attendance: 18,689; Referee: K. Barrett

17 October 1987 12	Manchester United	2–1	Norwich City	Manchester
	Davenport 46'; Robson 80'		Biggins 29'	Stadium: Old Trafford; Attendance: 39,345; Referee: G. Alpin

24 October 1987 13	Sheffield Wednesday	1–0	Norwich City	Sheffield
	Pearson 12'			Stadium: Hillsborough; Attendance: 15,861; Referee: M. Peck

31 October 1987 14	Norwich City	1–1	Queens Park Rangers	Norwich
	Biggins 64'		Allen 80'	Stadium: Carrow Road; Attendance: 14,522; Referee: D. Axcell

7 November 1987 15	Charlton Athletic	2–0	Norwich City	London
	Bennett 15'; Jones 22'			Stadium: Selhurst Park; Attendance: 5,044; Referee: J. Ashworth

14 November 1987 16	Norwich City	2–4	Arsenal	Norwich
	Drinkell 31' 81'		Rocastle 49' 54'; Thomas 52'; Groves 61'	Stadium: Carrow Road; Attendance: 20,558; Referee: J. Key

21 November 1987 17	Liverpool	0–0	Norwich City	Liverpool
				Stadium: Anfield; Attendance: 37,446; Referee: J. Deakin

28 November 1987 18	Norwich City	0–1	Portsmouth	Norwich
			Horne 36'	Stadium: Carrow Road; Attendance: 13,099; Referee: T. Holbrook

5 December 1987 19	Luton Town	1–2	Norwich City	Luton
	Stein 20'		Gordon 61'; Crook 88'	Stadium: Kenilworth Road; Attendance: 7,002; Referee: D. Scott

18 December 1987 20	Wimbledon	1–0	Norwich City	London
	Fashanu 14'			Stadium: Plough Lane; Attendance: 4,026; Referee: A. Seville

26 December 1987 21	Derby County	1–2	Norwich City	Derby
	Wright 49'		Fleck 33'; Gordon 52'	Stadium: Baseball Ground; Attendance: 15,452; Referee: V. Callow

28 December 1987 22	Norwich City	3–0	Chelsea	Norwich
	Fox 51'; Goss 71'; Drinkell 76' (pen.)			Stadium: Carrow Road; Attendance: 19,668; Referee: K. Morton

1 January 1988 23	Norwich City	4–1	West Ham United	Norwich
	Gordon 47'; Drinkell 67'; Bowen 79'; Rosario 86'		Cottee 27'	Stadium: Carrow Road; Attendance: 20,059; Referee: B. Hall

16 January 1988 24	Norwich City	0–3	Everton	Norwich
			Sharp 21' 87'; Heath 90'	Stadium: Carrow Road; Attendance: 15,750; Referee: S. Lodge

23 January 1988 25	Southampton	0–0	Norwich City	Southampton
				Stadium: The Dell; Attendance: 12,002; Referee: R. Lewis

6 February 1988 26	Norwich City	0–0	Watford	Norwich
				Stadium: Carrow Road; Attendance: 13,318; Referee: M. Bailey

13 February 1988 27	Newcastle United	1–3	Norwich City	Newcastle
	Gascoigne 34'		Fleck 2' 58'; Drinkell 85'	Stadium: St James' Park; Attendance: 21,068; Referee: A. Flood

20 February 1988 28	Coventry City	0–0	Norwich City	Coventry
			Elliott (red card)	Stadium: Highfield Road; Attendance: 15,577; Referee: E. Parker

5 March 1988 29	Norwich City	1–0	Manchester United	Norwich
	Fleck 76'			Stadium: Carrow Road; Attendance: 19,129; Referee: M. Reed

12 March 1988 30	Tottenham Hotspur	1–3	Norwich City	London
	Claesen 85'		Goss 37'; Fleck 67'; Drinkell 75'	Stadium: White Hart Lane; Attendance: 19,322; Referee: G. Tyson

16 March 1988 31	Norwich City	4–2	Oxford United	Norwich
	Linighan 10'; Fleck 65' 80'; Drinkell 72'		Bardsley 45'; Hebberd 82'; Phillips (red card)	Stadium: Carrow Road; Attendance: 12,280; Referee: K. Miller

19 March 1988 32	Queens Park Rangers	3–0	Norwich City	London
	Channing 25'; Coney 47'; Fereday 81'			Stadium: Loftus Road; Attendance: 9,033; Referee: D. Allison

26 March 1988 33	Norwich City	0–3	Sheffield Wednesday	Norwich
			Sterland 43' (pen.); Jonsson 75'; Chapman 80'	Stadium: Carrow Road; Attendance: 13,280; Referee: D. Hutchinson

2 April 1988 34	Norwich City	2–0	Charlton Athletic	Norwich
	Fox 50'; Drinkell 58'			Stadium: Carrow Road; Attendance: 15,015; Referee: B. Stevens

4 April 1988 35	Arsenal	2–0	Norwich City	London
	Smith 38'; Groves 59'			Stadium: Highbury; Attendance: 19,341; Referee: B. Stevens

20 April 1988 36	Norwich City	0–0	Liverpool	Norwich
				Stadium: Carrow Road; Attendance: 22,509; Referee: R. Hart

23 April 1988 37	Norwich City	2–2	Portsmouth	Norwich
	Linighan 31'; Biggins 90' (pen.)		Quinn 59'; Mariner 68'	Stadium: Carrow Road; Attendance: 12,762; Referee: P. Don

30 April 1988 38	Norwich City	2–2	Luton Town	Norwich
	Drinkell 51'; Putney 63'		Stein 87'; Wilson 98' (pen.)	Stadium: Carrow Road; Attendance: 12,700; Referee: A. Ward

4 May 1988 39	Nottingham Forest	2–0	Norwich City	Nottingham
	Webb 9'; Glover 51'			Stadium: City Ground; Attendance: 11,610; Referee: A. Robinson

7 May 1988 40	Norwich City	0–1	Wimbledon	Norwich
			Gibson 82'	Stadium: Carrow Road; Attendance: 11,782; Referee: J. Martin

=== FA Cup ===
9 January 1988 Third Round	Swindon Town	0–0	Norwich City	Swindon
				Stadium: County Ground; Attendance: 12,807; Referee: K. Walmsley

13 January 1988 Third Round Replay	Norwich City	0–2	Swindon Town	Norwich
			Bamber 67' 87'	Stadium: Carrow Road; Attendance: 12,501; Referee: J. Moules

=== Littlewoods Cup ===
22 September 1987 Second Round, First Leg	Burnley	1–1	Norwich City	Burnley
	Oghani 7'		Biggins 15'	Stadium: Turf Moor; Attendance: 7,912; Referee: G. Courtney

7 October 1987 Second Round, Second Leg	Norwich City	1–0	Burnley	Norwich
	Bowen 48'		Oghani (red card)	Stadium: Carrow Road; Attendance: 6,168; Referee: I. Hemley

27 October 1987 Third Round	Stoke City	2–1	Norwich City	Stoke
	Daly 14'; Talbot 17'		Bruce 76'	Stadium: Victoria Ground; Attendance: 8,603; Referee: J. Moules

=== Simod Cup ===
19 January 1988 Third Round	Millwall	2–3	Norwich City	London
	Cascarino 18' 60'		Fleck 14' 23'; Goss 75'	Stadium: The Den; Attendance: 4,654; Referee: J. Key

23 February 1988 Fourth Round	Swindon Town	2–0	Norwich City	Swindon
	Elliott 64' (og.); Foley 72'			Stadium: County Ground; Attendance: 10,491; Referee: K. Barratt

== Appearances ==
Pos	Player	League			FA Cup			Littlewoods Cup			Simod Cup			Total		
Pos	Player	Starts	Sub	Goals	Starts	Sub	Goals	Starts	Sub	Goals	Starts	Sub	Goals	Starts	Subs	Goals
Goalkeepers
GK	Bryan Gunn	38	0	0	2	0	0	3	0	0	2	0	0	45	0	0
GK	Graham Benstead	2	0	0	–	–	–	–	–	–	–	–	–	2	0	0
Defenders
RB	Ian Culverhouse	33	0	0	2	0	0	3	0	0	2	0	0	40	0	0
LB	Tony Spearing	17	1	0	–	–	–	–	–	–	–	–	–	17	1	0
CB	Steve Bruce	19	0	2	–	–	–	3	0	1	–	–	–	21	0	3
CB	Ian Butterworth	34	1	0	2	0	0	1	1	0	2	0	0	39	2	0
CB	Andy Linighan	12	0	2	–	–	–	–	–	–	–	–	–	12	0	2
LB	Shaun Elliott	14	2	0	–	–	–	3	0	0	1	1	0	18	3	0
CB	Simon Ratcliffe	6	3	0	–	–	–	2	0	0	–	–	–	8	3	0
RB	Kenny Brown	7	0	0	–	–	–	–	–	–	–	–	–	7	0	0
CB	John O'Neill	1	0	0	–	–	–	–	–	–	–	–	–	1	0	0
Midfielders
CM	Mike Phelan	37	0	0	2	0	0	3	0	0	2	0	0	44	0	0
DM	Mark Bowen	23	1	1	2	0	0	3	0	1	2	0	0	30	1	2
AM	Trevor Putney	25	1	1	2	0	0	–	–	–	1	0	0	28	1	1
AM	Ruel Fox	33	1	2	2	0	0	2	0	0	2	0	0	30	1	2
CM	Jeremy Goss	20	2	2	2	0	0	–	–	–	2	0	1	24	2	3
AM	Dale Gordon	16	5	3	2	0	0	1	0	0	2	0	0	21	5	3
CM	Ian Crook	16	7	1	–	–	–	1	1	0	0	1	0	17	9	1
DM	David Williams	7	2	0	–	–	–	2	0	0	0	1	0	9	3	0
Forwards
ST	Kevin Drinkell	38	0	12	2	0	0	3	0	0	2	0	0	45	0	12
ST	Robert Fleck	18	0	7	0	1	0	–	–	–	2	0	2	20	1	9
ST	Wayne Biggins	15	5	5	–	–	–	3	0	1	1	0	0	19	5	6
ST	Robert Rosario	9	5	2	2	0	0	–	–	–	0	1	0	11	6	2

== Goalscorers ==
Rank	Position	Player	Division One	FA Cup	Littlewoods Cup	Simod Cup	Total
1	ST	Kevin Drinkell	12	0	0	0	12
2	ST	Robert Fleck	7	0	0	2	9
3	ST	Wayne Biggins	5	0	1	0	6
4	LW	Dale Gordon	3	0	0	0	3
4	CB	Steve Bruce	2	0	1	0	3
4	CM	Jeremy Goss	2	0	0	1	3
5	ST	Robert Rosario	2	0	0	0	2
5	RW	Ruel Fox	2	0	0	0	2
5	CB	Andy Linighan	2	0	0	0	2
5	LB/LW	Mark Bowen	1	0	1	0	2
6	LW	Trevor Putney	1	0	0	0	1
6	RW	Ian Crook	1	0	0	0	1

== Bibliography ==
- Canary Citizens Centenary Edition: Authors Mike Davage, John Eastwood and Kevan Platt ISBN 0711720207
- Barclays League Club Directory 1989: Editor Tony Williams ISBN 0-85144-472-5
- Norwich City: The Modern Era: Author Rob Hadgraft ISBN 978-1-905328-82-6
- News of the World Football Annual 1988-89 Editors Bill Bateson and Albert Sewell ISBN 0855431458
- Barclays League Club Directory 1993: Editor Tony Williams ISBN 1-873057-12-1
