= 1992–93 Norwich City F.C. season =

Norwich City
1992–93 season
- Chairman: Robert Chase
- Manager: Mike Walker
- Stadium: Carrow Road
- Premier League: 3rd
- FA Cup: Fourth round
- League Cup: Third round
- Top goalscorer: League: Robins (14); All: Robins (15)
- Average home league attendance: 16,154

During the 1992–93 English football season, Norwich City F.C. competed in the inaugural season of the Premier League. Norwich City led the league for much of the season, having been among the pre-season favourites for relegation, and were eight points clear of the field shortly before Christmas, before faltering in the final weeks to finish third behind the champions, Manchester United, and Aston Villa. Norwich finished the season with a goal difference of -4. To date, this remains the highest position achieved by a team with a negative goal difference in Premier League history.

== Build up to the season ==
=== Transfers In ===
- Mark Robins - Manchester United, 1992, £800,000
- Gary Megson - Manchester City, 1992, Free Transfer
- Efan Ekoku - Bournemouth, 26 March, £500,000

=== Transfers Out ===
- Robert Fleck - Chelsea, 1992, £2,100,000

== Season summary ==
=== August ===
15 August 1992 1	Arsenal	2–4	Norwich City	London
15:00	Bould 28'; Campbell 39'		Robins 69', 84'; Phillips 73'; Fox 82'	Stadium: Highbury; Attendance: 24,030; Referee: Alan Gunn

19 August 1992 2	Norwich City	2–1	Chelsea	Norwich
19:45	Phillips 57'; Robins 59'		Stuart 15'	Stadium: Carrow Road; Attendance: 15,164; Referee: Gerald Ashby

22 August 1992 3	Norwich City	1–1	Everton	Norwich
15:00	Fox 67'		Beardsley 55'	Stadium: Carrow Road; Attendance: 14,150; Referee: John Key

26 August 1992 4	Manchester City	3–1	Norwich City	Manchester
19:45	White 45', 80'; McMahon 90'		Megson 58'	Stadium: Maine Road; Attendance: 23,182; Referee: David Elleray

29 August 1992 5	Crystal Palace	1–2	Norwich City	London
15:00	McGoldrick 20'		Power 16'; Phillips 74'	Stadium: Selhurst Park; Attendance: 12,033; Referee: David Allison

31 August 1992 6	Norwich City	3–1	Nottingham Forest	Norwich
19:45	Crook 2'; Power 76'; Phillips 89'		Clough 31'	Stadium: Carrow Road; Attendance: 14,104; Referee: Brian Hill

Norwich had finished 18th the previous season and sold star striker Robert Fleck to Chelsea for a club record fee. This lead many pundits and experts to tip the Canaries to struggle in the new Premier League. In the opening weekend of the season Norwich City faced Arsenal at Highbury. Norwich did little to dispel these early predictions, finding themselves 2–0 behind at half time courtesy of goals from Steve Bould and Kevin Campbell. However the introduction of Mark Robins as a substitute was to set the tone for the rest of season. He quickly reduced the arrears with a diving header from a David Phillips free kick. Phillips, himself draw Norwich level after David Seaman misjudged a straightforward right wing cross. Ruel Fox then gave Norwich the lead from a tight angle before Robins sealed the comeback, pouncing on a mistake by Tony Adams to loft the ball over Seaman into the net.

Gaining points from losing positions was a key feature of Norwich's early season form. Another deft chip from Robins secured victory over Chelsea after falling behind to an early strike from Graham Stuart, while a Ruel Fox header salvaged a point against Everton. Norwich's first defeat of the season inevitably came at Manchester City, a ground they had not won at since 1964. However Norwich quickly bounced back to record a fine victory at Crystal Palace courtesy of a stunning scissor kick from David Phillips. At the end of the month Norwich played host to Nottingham Forest knowing that a win would put them top of the Premier League. In front of the Sky cameras, Ian Crook gave the Canaries the lead with a stunning free kick which was promptly cancelled out by an acute yet precise finish from Nigel Clough (both goals appearing at #11 and #12 on the 'Goals Goals Goals: 101 of the Very Best 1992/93 Premier League Goals' VHS). However Norwich were not to be denied and a defensive mix up allowed Lee Power to restore Norwich's lead. David Phillips sealed victory following a clever layback from Rob Newman.

=== September ===
5 September 1992 7	Norwich City	1–0	Southampton	Norwich
15:00	Robins 87'			Stadium: Carrow Road; Attendance: 12,452; Referee: Keith Hackett

12 September 1992 8	Chelsea	2–3	Norwich City	London
15:00	Harford 2'; Townsend 29'		Robins 46', 74'; Phillips 79'	Stadium: Stamford Bridge; Attendance: 16,880; Referee: Keren Barratt

19 September 1992 9	Norwich City	1–0	Sheffield Wednesday	Norwich
15:00	Newman 44'			Stadium: Carrow Road; Attendance: 13,367; Referee: Bob Nixon

26 September 1992 10	Coventry City	1–1	Norwich City	Coventry
15:00	Ndlovu 37'		Crook 13'	Stadium: Highfield Road; Attendance: 16,436; Referee: Alf Buksh

Norwich continued to defy expectations in September. Mark Robins bundled home late on against Southampton to hand Norwich the points despite a fine display from Tim Flowers in the Saints goal. The Canaries then travelled to Stamford Bridge, quickly finding themselves 2 goals behind from strikes by Mick Harford and Andy Townsend. However Norwich worked their way back into the contest thanks to some calamitous goalkeeping from Dave Beasant who allowed Mark Robins' tame effort to creep past him. Beasant was again caught out of position as Robins sidefooted Norwich's equalizer. However things went from bad to worse for Beasant who then allowed David Phillips scuffed shot to somehow squirm through his hands, gifting Norwich the points. Their position at the top of table was further entrenched with victory over Sheffield Wednesday at Carrow Road and a draw against Coventry City at Highfield Road. The Sky Blues were also upsetting the bookies with a fine start to the season of their own. Ian Crook's scything shot was cancelled out by a superb individual effort from Peter Ndlovu (both goals appearing at #22 and #23 on the 'Goals Goals Goals' VHS).

=== October ===
3 October 1992 11	Blackburn Rovers	7–1	Norwich City	Blackburn
15:00	Wegerle 8', 32'; Sherwood 27'; Shearer 43', 76'; Cowans 63'; Ripley 70'		Newman 39'	Stadium: Ewood Park; Attendance: 16,312; Referee: Roger Dilkes

17 October 1992 12	Norwich City	2–1	QPR	Norwich
15:00	Bowen 53' (pen.); Sutton 64'		Allen 77'	Stadium: Carrow Road; Attendance: 16,009; Referee: Dermot Gallagher

25 October 1992 13	Liverpool	4–1	Norwich City	Liverpool
15:00	Thomas 15'; Hutchison 20'; Burrows 52'; Walters 89' (pen.)		Butterworth 2'	Stadium: Anfield; Attendance: 36,318; Referee: Gary Lewis

31 October 1992 14	Norwich City	1–1	Middlesbrough	Norwich
15:00	Sutch 86'		Wilkinson 64'	Stadium: Carrow Road; Attendance: 14,499; Referee: Stephen Lodge

The start of the month saw Norwich surrender their lead at the top of the Premiership in spectacular style with a 7–1 thrashing by newly promoted Blackburn Rovers at Ewood Park. Alan Shearer underlined his status as the most promising young striker in the country with an outstanding display. This result helped to ensure that despite an eventual third-place finish, Norwich had the dubious distinction of finishing the season with a negative goal difference (-4).

Norwich bounced back from their Blackburn disaster by progressing to next of league cup with comfortable home win against Carlisle United. Chris Sutton scoring two identical headers from two identical Ian Culverhouse crosses. However, football was soon to pale into total insignificance as personal tragedy befell Norwich keeper Bryan Gunn. His daughter Francesca losing her brave battle against leukemia. Gunn remarkably played just days later in a 2–1 home success against QPR. Mark Bowen gave Norwich the lead before Chris Sutton powered home a second. Bradley Allen pounced on a poor backpass to set up a tense finish. However, Norwich and most significantly Gunn were not to be denied.

Norwich arrived on Merseyside in confident mood to take on Liverpool. It was a year when the Reds would fall way below their usual high standards. Norwich opened the scoring through Ian Butterworth, but Liverpool struck back to lead 2–1. The game then turned when Mark Bowen blazed widely over from the spot. Liverpool running out comfortable 4–1 winners. Further disappointment was to follow against struggling Middlesbrough. It took a late Daryl Sutch strike to keep Norwich in touch at the top.

=== November ===
9 November 1992 15	Oldham Athletic	2–3	Norwich City	Oldham
19:30	Sharp 25'; Marshall 43'		Robins 14', 27', 90'	Stadium: Boundary Park; Attendance: 11,081; Referee: Robbie Hart

21 November 1992 16	Norwich City	2–1	Sheffield United	Norwich
15:00	Pemberton 60' (o.g.); Robins 80'		Cork 71'	Stadium: Carrow Road; Attendance: 14,874; Referee: Mike Peck

28 November 1992 17	Aston Villa	2–3	Norwich City	Birmingham
15:00	Houghton 45'; Parker 46'		Phillips 17'; Beckford 30'; Sutch 49'	Stadium: Villa Park; Attendance: 28,837; Referee: Alf Buksh

The start of the month saw Norwich travel to Boundary Park in front of the sky cameras. In a pulsating game, a Mark Robins hat trick put Norwich City back on top of the Premier League after twice being pegged back by Oldham, with Oldham's second equalizer coming from a wonderful chip from outside the box by Ian Marshall. Norwich further stretched their advantage with a home win against Sheffield United. This was trumped by an outstanding 3–2 success at Villa Park. Norwich opened the scoring through David Phillips with Darren Beckford doubling the lead after a mistake from Nigel Spink. Villa leveled the game at 2–2 before Daryl Sutch scored the winner with a fierce drive.

=== December ===
5 December 1992 18	Norwich City	2–1	Wimbledon	Norwich
15:00	Robins 77'; Phillips 88'		Sanchez 53'	Stadium: Carrow Road; Attendance: 14,161; Referee: Stephen Lodge

12 December 1992 19	Manchester United	1–0	Norwich City	Manchester
15:00	Hughes 59'			Stadium: Old Trafford; Attendance: 34,500; Referee: Roger Milford

21 December 1992 20	Norwich City	0–2	Ipswich	Norwich
19:45			Kiwomya 51'; Thompson 87'	Stadium: Carrow Road; Attendance: 20,032; Referee: David Elleray

26 December 1992 21	Norwich City	0–0	Tottenham Hotspur	Norwich
15:00				Stadium: Carrow Road; Attendance: 19,413; Referee: John Martin

28 December 1992 22	Leeds United	0–0	Norwich City	Leeds
15:00				Stadium: Elland Road; Attendance: 30,282; Referee: Philip Don

David Phillips winner was enough to sink Wimbledon at Carrow Road. This meant that Norwich had now extended their lead at the top of the Premiership to 8 points. Norwich travelled to Old Trafford in confident mood ahead of the game against Manchester United. The game was settled by a goal from Mark Hughes who capitalized on a mistake by Daryl Sutch to fire past Bryan Gunn. It was a watershed moment for the Canaries who were about to embark on a 6 match winless run which would ultimately go a long way towards costing them the title.

Local rivals Ipswich chalked up an emphatic victory at Carrow Road with goals from Steve Thompson and Chris Kywomia. The year ended with disappointing goalless draws against Spurs and Leeds.

=== January ===
10 January 1993 23	Sheffield Wednesday	1–0	Norwich City	Sheffield
16:00	Worthington 42'			Stadium: Hillsborough; Attendance: 23,360; Referee: David Allison

16 January 1993 24	Norwich City	1–1	Coventry City	Norwich
15:00	Sutton 13'		Quinn 57'	Stadium: Carrow Road; Attendance: 13,613; Referee: Allan Gunn

27 January 1993 25	Norwich City	4–2	Crystal Palace	Norwich
19:45	Power 9', 89'; Sutton 26'; Goss 50'		Armstrong 2'; Thomas 45'	Stadium: Carrow Road; Attendance: 13,543; Referee: Vic Callow

30 January 1993 26	Everton	0–1	Norwich City	Liverpool
15:00			Sutton 15'	Stadium: Goodison Park; Attendance: 20,301; Referee: Ray Lewis

The new year failed to bring a change of fortune as Nigel Worthington's goal was enough for Sheffield Wednesday to secure all 3 points at Hillsborough (he would be manager of the Canaries seven years later). Norwich netted their first goal in almost 8 hours of football against Coventry but were eventually pegged back by a strike from Mick Quinn. Norwich regarded their first win since the start of December with a fine 4–2 success against Crystal Palace. Lee Power capping a fine individual performance with 2 goals. Norwich were further buoyed by a 1–0 success at Goodison Park through Chris Sutton.

=== February ===
10 February 1993 27	Southampton	3–0	Norwich City	Southampton
19:30	Hall 9'; Adams 25'; Banger 79'			Stadium: The Dell; Attendance: 12,969; Referee: Joe Worrall

20 February 1993 28	Norwich City	2–1	Manchester City	Norwich
15:00	Robins 28'; Power 29'		Sheron 46'	Stadium: Carrow Road; Attendance: 16.386; Referee: Brian Hill

28 February 1993 29	Norwich City	0–0	Blackburn Rovers	Norwich
				Stadium: Carrow Road; Attendance: 15.821; Referee: Philip Don

A heavy 3–0 defeat at Southampton was to follow before the Canaries chalked up their first win over Man City in nearly 30 years. This came courtesy of 2 goals in as many minutes. Norwich went some way to wiping away the memories of their disaster at Ewood Park with 0–0 draw at Carrow Road based on a strong defensive performance.

=== March ===
3 March 1993 30	Norwich City	1–1	Arsenal	Norwich
19:45	Fox 35'		Wright 65'	Stadium: Carrow Road; Attendance: 14.802; Referee: John Martin

6 March 1993 31	QPR	3–1	Norwich City	London
15:00	Ferdinand 19', 34'; Wilson 79'		Brevett 38' (o.g.)	Stadium: Loftus Road; Attendance: 13,892; Referee: Rodger Gifford

10 March 1993 32	Sheffield United	0–1	Norwich City	Sheffield
19:45			Fox 55'	Stadium: Bramall Lane; Attendance: 15,583; Referee: Gary Lewis

13 March 1993 33	Norwich City	1–0	Oldham Athletic	Norwich
15:00	Henry 12' (o.g.)			Stadium: Carrow Road; Attendance: 19,597; Referee: Roger Milford

17 March 1993 34	Nottingham Forest	0–3	Norwich City	Nottingham
19:30			Robins 45'; Power 73'; Crook 78'	Stadium: City Ground; Attendance: 20,799; Referee: Stephen Lodge

20 March 1993 35	Wimbledon	3–0	Norwich City	London
15:00	Holdsworth 16', 82'; Ardley 29'			Stadium: Selhurst Park; Attendance: 10,875; Referee: Keith Cooper

24 March 1993 36	Norwich City	1–0	Aston Villa	Norwich
19:45	Polston 81'			Stadium: Carrow Road; Attendance: 19,528; Referee: Robbie Hart

=== April ===
5 April 1993 37	Norwich City	1–3	Manchester United	Norwich
19:45	Robins 61'		Giggs 13'; Kanchelskis 20'; Cantona 21'	Stadium: Carrow Road; Attendance: 20,582; Referee: Paul Ward

9 April 1993 38	Tottenham Hotspur	5–1	Norwich City	London
15:00	Ruddock 27'; Sheringham 30', 77'; Barmby 55'; Nayim 83'		Ekoku 86'	Stadium: White Hart Lane; Attendance: 31,425; Referee: Keren Barratt

14 April 1993 39	Norwich City	4–2	Leeds United	Norwich
19:45	Sutton 11', 14', 79'; Phillips 15' (pen.)		Chapman 2'; Wallace 46'	Stadium: Carrow Road; Attendance: 18,613; Referee: Keith Burge

19 April 1993 40	Ipswich Town	3–1	Norwich City	Ipswich
19:45	Dozzell 21', 57'; Stockwell 52'		Sutton 41'	Stadium: Portman Road; Attendance: 21,081; Referee: Vic Callow

=== May ===
1 May 1993 41	Norwich City	1–0	Liverpool	Norwich
15:00	Phillips 62' (pen.)		James (red card) 60'	Stadium: Carrow Road; Attendance: 20,610; Referee: David Elleray

8 May 1993 42	Middlesbrough	3–3	Norwich City	Middlesbrough
15:00	Falconer 34'; Wilkinson 65'; Hendrie 74'		Ekoku 14', 66'; Johnson 68'	Stadium: Ayresome Park; Attendance: 15,155; Referee: Gerald Ashby

=== FA Cup ===
1992–93 FA Cup

13 January 1993 Round 3	Norwich City	1–0	Coventry City	Norwich
	Beckford			Stadium: Carrow Road

28 January 1993 Round 4	Norwich City	0–2	Tottenham Hotspur	Norwich
			Sheringham x 2	Stadium: Carrow Road

=== League Cup ===
1992–93 Football League Cup

22 September 1992 Round 2 Leg 1	Carlisle United	2–2	Norwich City	Carlisle
	Barnsley (pen); Edmondson		Goss; Robins	Stadium: Brunton Park

7 October 1992 Round 2 Leg 2	Norwich City	2–0 (4–2 agg.)	Carlisle United	Norwich
	Sutton x 2			Stadium: Carrow Road

28 October 1992 Round 3	Blackburn Rovers	2–0	Norwich City	Blackburn
	May; Shearer			Stadium: Ewood Park

== Final league table ==
Pos	Team	Pld	W	D	L	GF	GA	GD	Pts	Qualification or relegation
1	Manchester United (C)	42	24	12	6	67	31	+36	84	Qualification for the Champions League first round
2	Aston Villa	42	21	11	10	57	40	+17	74	Qualification for the UEFA Cup first round (Note: Since League Cup winners Arsenal had qualified for the UEFA Cup Winners Cup by also winning the FA Cup, the UEFA Cup berth for the League Cup reverted to the league and was awarded to Norwich City. England was considered for an extra slot for the UEFA Cup after the 1993 Polish football scandal, but another one was given to Scotland, and it was thought excessive to give both two slots to Great Britain, and the extra place was awarded to Hungary.)
3	Norwich City	42	21	9	12	61	65	−4	72	Qualification for the UEFA Cup first round
4	Blackburn Rovers	42	20	11	11	68	46	+22	71	
5	Queens Park Rangers	42	17	12	13	63	55	+8	63	

Source: Premier League
Rules for classification: 1) points; 2) goal difference; 3) number of goals scored.
(C) Champions

== Players ==
=== First-team squad ===
Squad at end of season

Note: Flags indicate national team as defined under FIFA eligibility rules; some limited exceptions apply. Players may hold more than one non-FIFA nationality.

Pos.	Nation	Player
GK	WAL	Mark Walton
GK	SCO	Bryan Gunn
DF	ENG	Ian Butterworth (captain)
DF	ENG	Ian Culverhouse
DF	ENG	Jason Minett
DF	ENG	Robert Newman
DF	ENG	John Polston (vice-captain)
DF	ENG	Daryl Sutch
DF	ENG	Robert Ullathorne
DF	ENG	Colin Woodthorpe
DF	WAL	Mark Bowen
DF	WAL	Mark Peters

Pos.	Nation	Player
MF	ENG	Ian Crook
MF	ENG	Ruel Fox (Note: Fox was born in Ipswich, England, and played for the England B team, but also qualified to represent Montserrat internationally and would make his international debut for Montserrat in 2004.)
MF	WAL	Andy Johnson (Note: Johnson was born in Bristol, England, but also qualified to represent Wales internationally and made his international debut for Wales in 1998.)
MF	ENG	Gary Megson
MF	ENG	David Smith
MF	WAL	Jeremy Goss (Note: Goss was born in Oekolia, Cyprus, but also qualified to represent Wales internationally and made his international debut for Wales in May 1991.)
MF	WAL	David Phillips (Note: Phillips was born in Wegberg, Germany, but also qualified to represent Wales internationally and made his international debut for Wales in May 1984.)
FW	ENG	Darren Beckford
FW	ENG	Efan Ekoku (Note: Ekoku was born in Cheetham, England, but also qualified to represent Nigeria internationally and would make his international debut for Nigeria in 1994.)
FW	ENG	Mark Robins
FW	ENG	Chris Sutton
FW	IRL	Lee Power (Note: Power was born in Lewisham, England, but also qualified to represent the Republic of Ireland internationally and represented them at U-21 and B level.)
