= David McNally =

David McNally may refer to:

- David McNally (director) (born 1960), English film director
- David McNally (football), former chief executive of Norwich City F.C.
- David McNally (academic) (born 1953), Canadian political scientist
- Dave McNally (1942–2002), American baseball player
