= Shawn Elliott =

Shawn, Shaun, or Sean Elliott may refer to:

- Shawn Elliott (actor) (1937–2016), American actor and singer
- Shawn Elliott (American football) (born 1973), American football coach and defensive end
- Sean Elliott (born 1968), American basketball player
- Shaun Elliott (born 1957), English footballer

== See also ==
- DeShon Elliott (born 1997), American football safety
