= Bryan Gunn =

Scottish association football player and manager

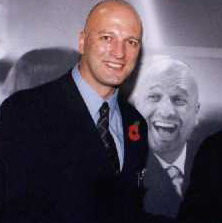
- Gunn at his own-named catering facility club at Carrow Road in November 2007

Personal information
- Full name: Bryan James Gunn
- Date of birth: 22 December 1963 (age 62)
- Place of birth: Thurso, Scotland
- Position: Goalkeeper

Youth career
- 1979–1980: Invergordon
- 1980–1982: Aberdeen

Senior career*
Years	Team	Apps	(Gls)
1982–1986	Aberdeen	15	(0)
1986–1998	Norwich City	390	(0)
1998	→ Hibernian (loan)	12	(0)
1998–1999	Hibernian	0	(0)
Total		417	(0)

International career
1990–1994	Scotland	6	(0)

Managerial career
- 2009: Norwich City
- * Club domestic league appearances and goals

Bryan James Gunn (born 22 December 1963) is a Scottish former professional goalkeeper and football manager. After beginning his career at Aberdeen in the early 1980s, he spent most of his playing career at Norwich City, the club with which he came to be most closely associated. This was followed by a brief spell back in Scotland with Hibernian before his retirement as a player in 1998.

Gunn feels the peak of his playing career was making what he calls the save of his life in the UEFA Cup match against Bayern Munich in 1993. This event was called the summit of Norwich City's history by The Independent. He is one of only nine Norwich players to win the club's Player of the Year award twice. He was made an inaugural member of Norwich City's Hall of Fame. He was a member of the Scotland national football team, making six appearances for his country in the early 1990s.

Gunn worked for years behind the scenes at Norwich in a variety of roles, from matchday hosting to coaching. He was appointed temporary manager towards the end of the 2008–09 season and then confirmed as permanent manager during the summer. However, after a 7–1 home defeat in the opening game to local rivals Colchester United, he lost his job a week into the 2009–10 Football League One season.

Since the death of his young daughter from leukaemia in 1992, Gunn has been extensively involved in fundraising to combat the disease and its effects. As of 2011 he has raised more than £1 million for research into childhood leukaemia. The money has been used to fund projects to improve the lives of children with leukaemia and their families, notably a national telephone support line. The city of Norwich recognised Gunn's charity work and his long association with the city's football club by naming him Sheriff for 2002. Published in 2006, his autobiography, In Where it Hurts: My Autobiography, includes a foreword by his former manager Alex Ferguson.

== Early life ==
Gunn was born on 22 December 1963 in Thurso, Scotland, "twenty miles from John o'Groats". His parents were James Gunn, a long-distance lorry driver, and Jessie Sinclair, a canteen worker at the Dounreay nuclear power plant; the pair had married despite being on opposite sides of a family feud stretching back to the 16th century. James was an amateur sportsman, playing football on the right wing for local team Invergordon and winning medals at Highland games events.

The Gunn family home in Thurso was a farm, and the young Bryan would often pester the farmhands to play football with him. They would use a turnip if no ball was available. By the age of four he was keen on goalkeeping; he was fearless of injury and enjoyed diving on the ball. When Gunn was four-and-a-half, the family moved to Invergordon, 20 miles from Inverness. He attended Park Primary School in the town and joined the school football team. Future professional Bobby Geddes was favoured over him as first-choice goalkeeper for the team; Gunn played as an outfield player until Geddes moved on to secondary school.

Gunn attended secondary school at Invergordon Academy from 1975 to 1980, and gained O Grades in a variety of subjects, including English, maths, history and chemistry. He failed his French exam after taking it while "on the road" with Scotland under-15s. At the age of 13, he was invited to play for the under-15 Invergordon F.C. team by one of his school teachers, who managed the team. The team was beaten 9–0 in Gunn's debut, but his subsequent performances attracted the attention of national selectors, and he joined the Scotland under-15 squad around the same time he signed for Aberdeen at age 14.

== Club career ==
=== Aberdeen ===
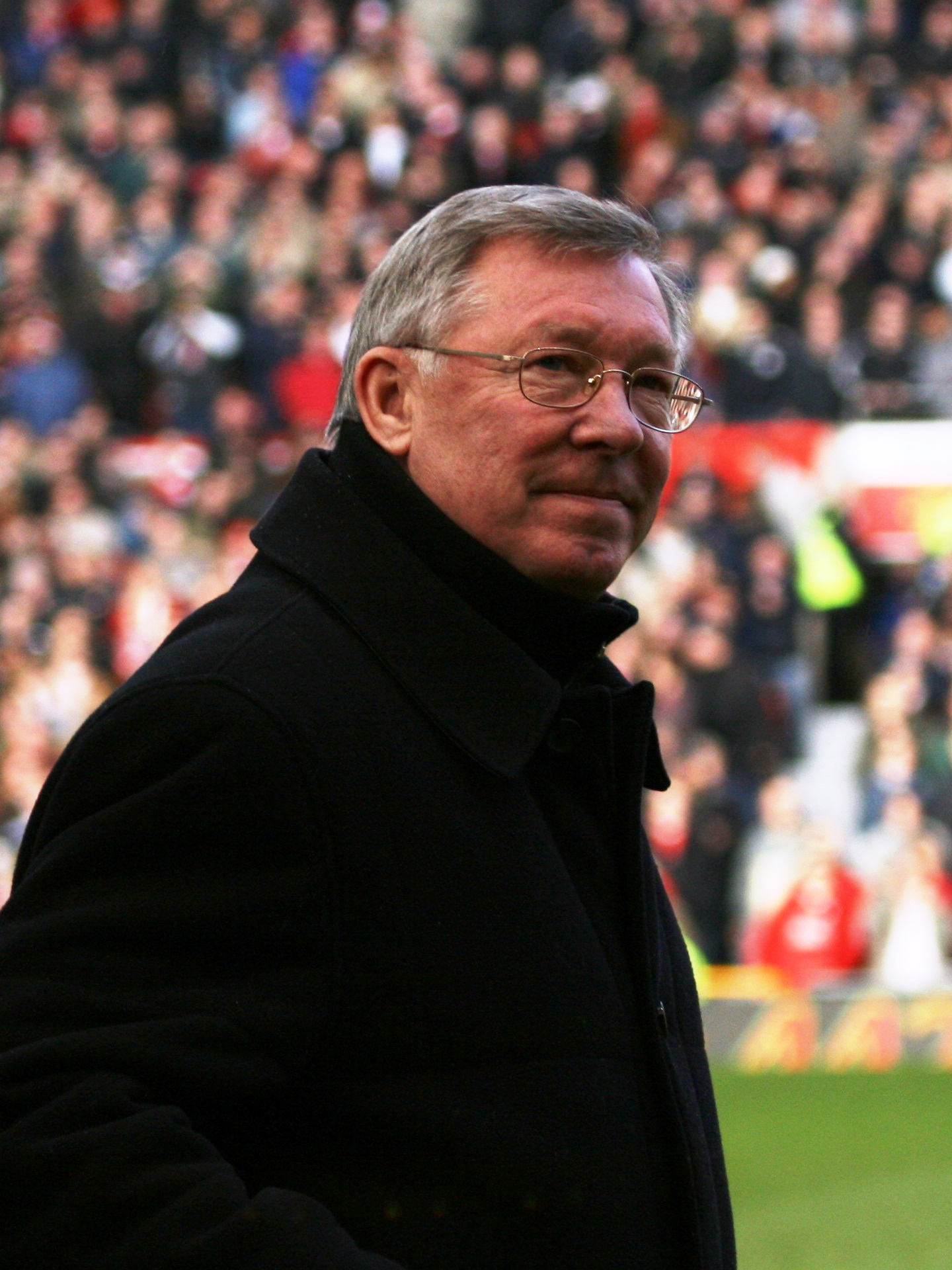
The manager of Aberdeen, Alex Ferguson, mentored Gunn.

Gunn commenced his professional career with Aberdeen in 1980, (signing a week prior to Eric Black who came from the same part of the country) and forged a good relationship with Aberdeen manager Alex Ferguson — evidenced by the fact that in 1997 Ferguson brought Manchester United to Carrow Road for Gunn's testimonial match. While an apprentice at Aberdeen, Gunn was a frequent babysitter for Ferguson's children. He later said, "I probably babysat more than I played". Gunn portrays the relationship as warm, but businesslike:

I'd stay over and we'd read the Sunday papers together. He was good to me. I was struggling for cash once and went in and told him I was going on holiday and was there any chance of an advance. He got on the phone and said: "Big Bryan Gunn's coming down to sign a new contract." It wasn't what I meant. I got my holiday money but he got another year out of me, too.

As a youngster, Gunn did not always play in goal and he was viewed as a handy outfield player in his early years at Aberdeen. Ferguson recalls, "He could strike a ball as well as anyone, so well in fact that I once played him at centre-forward in a reserve match ... He scored a brilliant goal ... It was a marvellous moment." However, as a professional, and at his adult height of 6 ft 2 in (1.88 m), Gunn settled into playing in goal. Gunn ascribes much of his goalkeeping success to the support of Belgian Marc De Clerck, a specialist goalkeeping coach at Aberdeen. At a time when few British teams provided such training, De Clerck introduced Gunn and Scottish international keeper Jim Leighton to what were then innovative training techniques. The goalkeepers would participate in special drills whilst training with the rest of the squad. Gunn also notes the influence of Aberdeen coach Teddy Scott, who taught the value of hard work and dedication; Gunn also served as a boot boy for Alex McLeish. Leighton's presence meant that Gunn played only 21 games for Aberdeen. He made his debut against Hibernian at Pittodrie on 30 October 1982, and went on to keep four clean sheets for the club. Despite being rivals for a first-team place, Gunn had an excellent relationship with Leighton that included joining Leighton's family for a meal once a week.

Gunn's training and performances for the reserve team and occasional first-team appearances paid dividends: he was called up for the Scotland under-21 team, and made his debut in November 1983 against East Germany. As a reserve team player, Gunn won the Scottish 2nd XI Cup and Aberdeenshire Cup in 1981–82, and the SFL Reserve Cup in 1984–85 At senior level, he also received Scottish League Cup and European Cup Winners Cup winner's medals while with Aberdeen, although he was an unused substitute in both finals. He made an unexpected appearance in the 1986 European Cup quarter final, against Gothenburg. "Jim and I were warming up and he lost [his] contact lenses [so] I ended up being included in the starting line up," Gunn recalls. Gunn had an excellent match: The Glasgow Herald's match report stated, "Only outstanding work by Willie Miller and Bryan Gunn kept the Swedes at bay". As well as making several key saves, he was credited with playing a part in Aberdeen's second goal following a long kick upfield.

As Leighton was unlikely to be dislodged, Ferguson promised to find Gunn another club, and fulfilled his pledge when he sold him for £100,000 to Norwich City in October 1986. The transfer nearly went through in the summer of 1986, but Ferguson delayed the move until October to allow time for Leighton to recover from an injury.

=== Norwich City ===
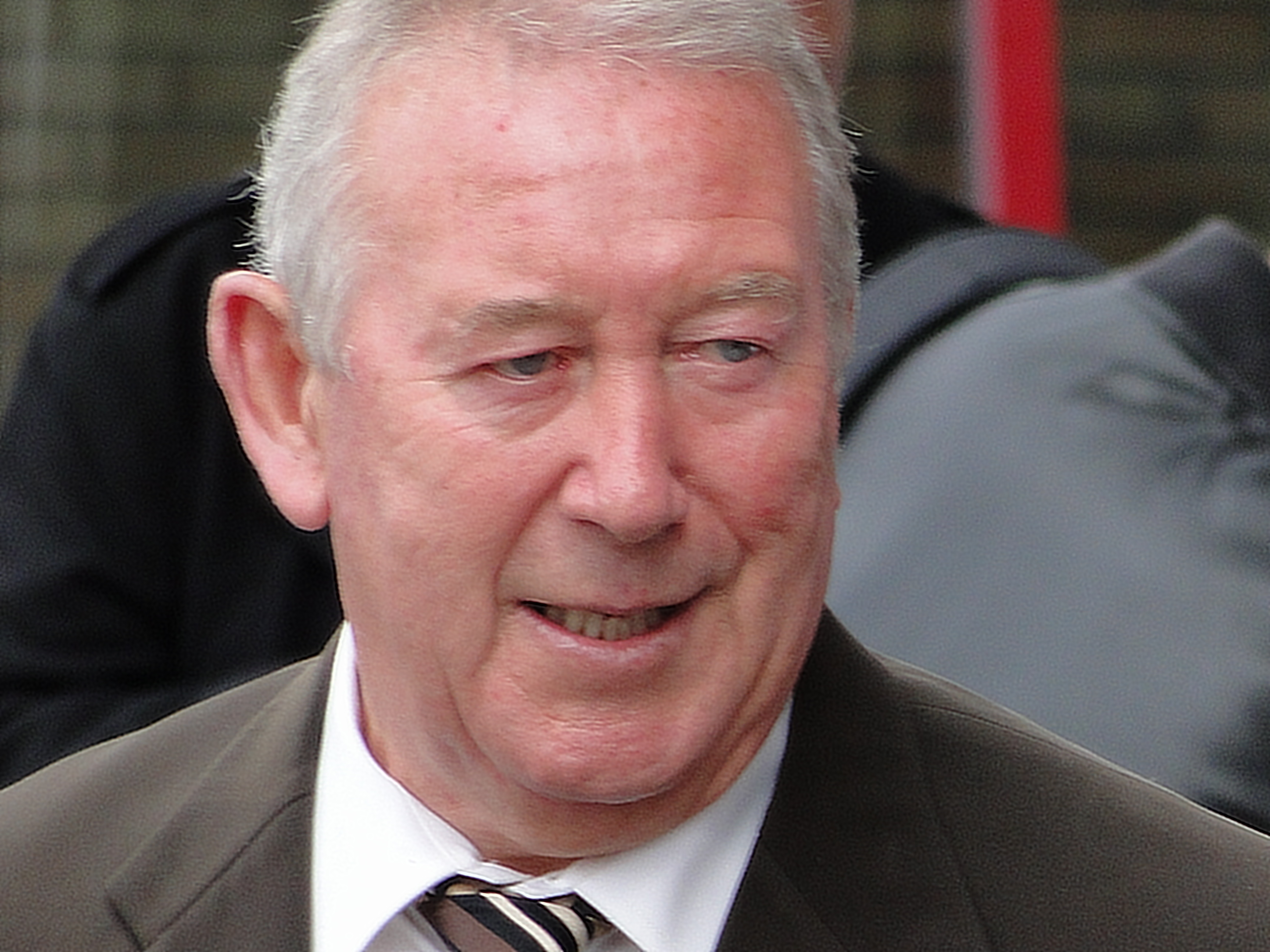
Ken Brown, the Norwich manager who signed Gunn.

Gunn says of the move south: "Norwich was easy to settle into, a bit like Aberdeen in many ways — a city surrounded by lovely countryside and lots of farms." However, since he joined the club partway into the new season, he initially found it difficult to take over as first-choice goalkeeper. Gunn had been bought as a replacement for England international goalkeeper Chris Woods, who had moved to Rangers. Meanwhile, Graham Benstead made a series of good performances and Norwich were top of the league. Ken Brown wanted to be fair to Benstead and made Gunn wait. A 6–2 defeat at Anfield proved to be the catalyst for Gunn's promotion to the first team. He made his debut in a Full Members Cup win against Coventry City, conceding a penalty, and made his league debut in a 2–1 victory against Tottenham Hotspur at Carrow Road on 8 November 1986.

Norwich went on to finish fifth in the First Division in his first season, their highest-ever league finish at the time. By May 1988 Gunn's consistency meant his value had risen considerably, and the club reportedly declined a £500,000 offer from Ian Porterfield to take Gunn back to Aberdeen. The purpose of the proposed transfer was to replace Leighton, who by then had moved to Manchester United, where he was reunited with Alex Ferguson.

Norwich reached the semi-final of the FA Cup in 1989 with Gunn in goal, but he missed the semi-final in 1992 through injury. What has been described as his — and Norwich's — greatest moment came in their upset victory over European giants Bayern Munich in the UEFA Cup in 1993. The Independent described the match as "the pinnacle of Norwich City's history". Gunn made several saves that kept the Canaries in the match. He describes the save he made from Bayern striker Adolfo Valencia as the finest of his career; it has also been described as "one of the most outstanding saves by a City goalkeeper". However, he was involved in an own-goal incident in an East Anglian derby match in the 1995–96 season, when a backpass from Robert Ullathorne bounced awkwardly off the pitch and over Gunn's attempted clearance kick.

"The major highlights of my time at Norwich were the UEFA Cup run and qualifying for it. Norwich finished 3rd in the first ever Premier League season ... The match against Bayern Munich ... was a great occasion where I pulled off my best ever save ... In 1989 we finished 4th in Division 1 and got to the FA cup semi-final ... The main disappointment was being relegated in 1994/95 after I broke my leg [when] we were 7th in the Premier League ... I also ... let in a calamitous goal at [the] home of our arch rivals Ipswich Town. Robert Ullathorne's backpass bobbled (the pitch was crap) over my attempted kick and ended up in the back of the net. Very embarrassing."

— Bryan Gunn, Squarefootball.com

In November 1989, Gunn was involved in a controversial incident that attracted significant media attention. Norwich played Arsenal at Highbury and with five minutes remaining, Arsenal's David O'Leary scored an equaliser that brought the scores to 3–3. Then, in the dying seconds of the match, the referee awarded Arsenal a penalty kick — and the chance to seal the match. The Norwich players were already annoyed by the match situation, and their perception was that the decision was "really dodgy". Gunn saved Lee Dixon's shot, but the ball was not cleared. In the resulting melee, Mark Bowen and Ian Culverhouse for Norwich and Alan Smith for Arsenal challenged for the ball. "The three of them got in an almighty tangle and the ball, along with all of them, was bundled over the line," Gunn remembers. The goal was awarded, but the situation rapidly deteriorated: the three players in the goal had "a little skirmish". Separately, Arsenal's Nigel Winterburn gave "a gloat to Dale Gordon, who promptly pushed him". The result was mayhem:

"All of a sudden it was kicking off, big time. Everyone started piling in, right in front of me... The only people not involved were [Arsenal players] John Lukic, Tony Adams, David O'Leary and me... I went over to break things up... and spotted the cavalry coming over the half-way line, in the shape of O'Leary and Adams. I felt it was my job to head them off at the pass and moved in, instinctively grabbing Adams with one hand and thumping him with the other."

All but one of the 22 players on the pitch were involved in the fracas, but no one was sent off. The next day, the newspapers carried headlines and photos of what they called "The Highbury Brawl". That afternoon, Gunn received a phone call from a Today journalist, who told him that the Arsenal players had said Gunn had instigated the fight. Enraged, Gunn retorted that it was the other way around. Monday's headline read "Gunn blames Arsenal". Gunn was censured by The Football Association and warned about his future conduct. Both clubs were fined, and Gunn was docked a fortnight's wages (about £800) by Norwich City.

Under the management of John Deehan, Norwich were seventh in the Premier League in the 1994–95 season when Gunn broke and dislocated his ankle whilst playing against Nottingham Forest. His importance to the team was underlined when they subsequently plummeted down the table, winning just one of their remaining 17 games as Gunn recovered. The team was ultimately relegated. Gunn retained a regular first team place for the 1995–96 season and, beginning with the match against Wolverhampton Wanderers on 17 February 1996, began to captain the side, initially in the absence of regular captain Jon Newsome and then on a permanent basis after Newsome left the club. However, when Mike Walker took over as manager for the following 1996–97 season, he appointed Ian Crook as captain instead.

Gunn's final first-team game for the club was a 1–0 defeat to Crewe Alexandra on 31 January 1998. According to the Sunday Mirror, he produced "a sparkling display", which proved his abilities had "not been dulled by time". Gunn made 478 first team appearances for Norwich in all competitions. He was voted Norwich City Player of the Year in 1988 and 1993. The latter award came at the end of the 1992–93 FA Premier League season, in which Norwich finished third in the Premier League, their best-ever performance. The club awarded Gunn a testimonial match in 1996, and Alex Ferguson brought Manchester United to Carrow Road.

=== Hibernian ===
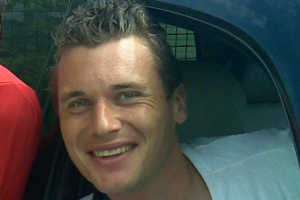
Andy Marshall displaced Gunn from the Norwich first team.

In the 1997–98 season, Gunn was forced out of the Norwich team by the emergence of Andy Marshall. With his first-team opportunities at Norwich now limited, he signed a deal with Hibernian in February 1998, for a three-month loan. According to Scottish transfer regulations the loan deal was invalid, so instead he was swiftly transferred on a permanent basis for an undisclosed fee, later revealed by Gunn to have been £25,000.

Gunn's reflections on joining Hibernian are tinged with regret: "[leaving Norwich was] very difficult indeed. I had spent 12 great years at Norwich and suddenly I was not regarded as the number 1 (by Mike Walker) anymore." He joined Hibernian when they were bottom of the Scottish Premier Division; Alex McLeish had recently been appointed manager.

Gunn was unable to save the club from relegation to the First Division, but signed a two-year contract in July 1998. However, a hairline fracture to his leg, sustained during the 1998 close season, effectively ended his playing career. On his doctors' advice, Gunn formally retired in March 1999.

Despite his mixed feelings on joining the club, Gunn's overall impression of his time in Edinburgh is upbeat: "I only played 12 games for the Hibees but it was great. We beat Hearts in my only derby game 2–1 (John Robertson scored his [27th] goal for Hearts in derbies but I told him it was worth nothing as we had won) (Note: John Robertson scored 27 goals in Edinburgh derby matches.) and had a clean sheet at Celtic Park (stopping them from winning the SPL that day)." He received what he described as a "wonderful reception" from Aberdeen fans when playing for Hibernian against his former club.

== International career ==
Gunn represented Scotland at the youth international level. He was part of the squad that won the 1982 UEFA European Under-18 Football Championship, but was unavailable to play in the final because Aberdeen had reached the 1982 Scottish Cup Final. He was replaced by Robin Rae for the final, in which the Scots beat Czechoslovakia 3–1.

In 1983, Gunn travelled with the Scotland Under-19s to Mexico for the 1983 FIFA World Youth Championship. Gunn played in all four of Scotland's matches and it was a formative experience, as he faced a variety of challenges in the tournament. The adidas ball in use "really zipped through the air", which encouraged long-range shots at the high altitude. In the first match, against South Korea, an element of the 26,000 crowd "clearly didn't like us at all ... I got absolutely pelted with coins ... and rotten fruit". The final insult was when he was hit on the back of the neck by a rancid-smelling plastic bag containing rotten fish. Gunn found it "intimidation ... a nightmare" but adopted the strategy of patrolling the edge of his area to stay out of range and had "one of the best games of my life": he kept a clean sheet as Scotland won 2–0. Scotland's coach and future manager of the full international team Andy Roxburgh told Gunn "it was the best performance he'd ever seen from a Scottish goalkeeper, at any level." The final group match, which Scotland needed to win in order to progress, was against the home side, Mexico. The official attendance at the Azteca Stadium was 86,582, although Gunn believes the true figure was over 100,000. Once more, Gunn was targeted with a variety of missiles, including a bottle of Johnnie Walker, but as Scotland held on to their early 1–0 lead, the fans became disillusioned with their own team and switched to sending a "hail of bottles and coins" on the Mexican players. Scotland lost 1–0 in the quarter-final against Poland.

Gunn made six full international appearances for Scotland, conceding 10 goals. He was a member of the squad for the 1990 FIFA World Cup, but played in none of Scotland's three matches at the tournament, as he was third-choice goalkeeper behind Jim Leighton and Andy Goram. He made his Scotland debut in a pre-tournament friendly match against Egypt, but was at fault for two Egyptian goals, resulting in a 3–1 defeat for Scotland. The embarrassment was made worse by the fact that his parents were watching. Gunn made four appearances for Scotland in 1994 FIFA World Cup qualification matches. His last cap was as a second-half substitute in a 3–1 friendly defeat by the Netherlands in May 1994.

== Coaching career and other activities ==
Gunn obtained his coaching certification while still with Aberdeen, in 1983, at Largs. After his retirement from playing professional football in 1999, Gunn initially worked on the hospitality staff at Carrow Road, particularly in "The Gunn Club", a catering outlet named in his honour.

Over the years, Gunn progressed from hospitality into other corporate positions at Norwich; he acted as sponsorship manager from 1999 to 2006. Manager Peter Grant moved Gunn to the "backroom" sports management side of the business in 2007. Gunn worked in a liaison role in negotiations of possible transfers and loan signings, tasks where he could make use of contacts gained during his playing career.

When Glenn Roeder was appointed manager in November 2007, goalkeeping coach James Hollman parted company with the club, and Gunn replaced him for the rest of the season — his first formal coaching role. Later in the season, Gunn was promoted to head of player recruitment, while retaining his goalkeeping coach role.

=== Manager of Norwich City ===
Following the sacking of Roeder as Norwich manager in January 2009, Gunn was asked to take temporary charge of the first team. In an interview with BBC Radio Norfolk, he revealed that he "told the players that they've let people down." In his first match as caretaker manager, he received "a euphoric reception" from the fans, and Norwich beat Barnsley 4–0. The players were equally supportive: according to Scotland on Sunday, "in the dressing room afterwards, [Norwich] midfielder, Darel Russell, dragged the chairman, Roger Munby, into the shower, and demanded that Gunn be appointed permanently." Momentum gathered, and a Facebook group called "Bryan Gunn for manager", created by his then 17-year-old daughter, Melissa, soon attracted about 3,000 members. Gunn considered applying for the role on a longer-term basis; he had previously applied without success to be Norwich manager in 1998. On 19 January 2009 he phoned the directors and requested to be considered. He was interviewed that afternoon and "by 10.30 am the next day had been appointed manager until the end of the season".

Gunn appointed a backroom staff of former Norwich colleagues, making Ian Crook first-team coach and John Deehan chief scout. However, the initial turnaround in form could not be maintained; having lost their last three games of the season, Norwich were relegated from the Championship. Gunn labelled his players as an "embarrassment" after the 4–2 defeat to Charlton Athletic that sealed relegation to League One. Despite relegation to the third tier of English football for the first time in nearly 50 years, writing in Tales from the City, Gunn said of the match "Even going to Charlton on the last day, I thought we could survive... We lost 4-2 and were relegated to the third tier. I was shell-shocked; the emptiest I have ever felt in a sporting or professional context. The directors went on the field to face the fans and to thank them for their support and I had tears in my eyes when I saw Delia and Michael doing that. I told them how sorry I was."

Relegation changed Gunn's mind about taking the Norwich job. He had decided not to continue in the role if Norwich had remained in the Championship, and would have tried to land a job with Norwich that would have allowed more time to be spent with his family. However, "Relegation was a failure and I felt I couldn't quit then. I felt I had to do everything I could to put things right, if I was given the chance. And I was."

Norwich re-appointed Gunn as manager for the 2009–10 season. Crook, as first team coach, and former Canary Ian Butterworth, as assistant manager, completed the management team. Over the summer, Gunn signed 12 players, including Australian Michael Theoklitos, a goalkeeper from Melbourne Victory. He then steered the club through a programme of pre-season friendly matches, in which Norwich was unbeaten.

Just under a month after Gunn's reappointment, Norwich appointed a new managing director, David McNally. For the opening game of the new season, Norwich were to play at home against Colchester United, rivals for the Pride of Anglia. Gunn's team suffered a 7–1 defeat, and Theoklitos, signed by Gunn on a free transfer, was particularly blamed by the press for the scale of the defeat. Theoklitos later admitted it was "the worst performance of my career". Despite this, he retained Gunn's support, although in the eventuality, Theoklitos never played for Norwich again.

As early as during the match itself, fans and the media began to react strongly to the shock of Norwich's worst-ever home defeat. During the first half, after the side had gone 4–0 down, two supporters approached the Norwich bench, appearing to throw their season tickets at Gunn. Many fans walked out before the match ended, and there was a protest outside the ground afterwards. Media coverage of the match was unsurprisingly negative: the BBC used terms such as "calamitous defending", "Colchester run riot", "dismal", and a "disastrous start"; journalists also speculated about Gunn's competence as a manager. Matters seemed to stabilise a little with a 4–0 League Cup win at Yeovil the following Tuesday. However, Gunn was sacked by McNally on 14 August 2009, six days after the defeat by Colchester.

Gunn was influenced in his management philosophy by former Norwich manager Mike Walker. Himself a former goalkeeper, Walker believed, contrary to popular opinion, that goalkeepers can make good managers because their excellent view of the game enables them to develop a good tactical awareness. Gunn's short time at Norwich remains his only experience of professional football management. He says of the time spent as manager that his only regret is that "there must be a generation of fans who only know me as the manager who lost 7-1 against Colchester... My own memories are different."

== Managerial statistics ==
As of 14 August 2009

Managerial record by team and tenure
Team	From	To	Record					Ref
Team	From	To	P	W	D	L	Win %	Ref
Norwich City	16 January 2009	14 August 2009	21	6	5	10	28.6	
Total			21	6	5	10	28.6	—

== After football ==
Gunn began work in November 2009 as director of business development for OneStream, part of the Digital Phone Company, based in Great Yarmouth. His role was to "promote their communication and mobile working solutions".

In 2011, Gunn announced he was leaving OneStream for a new job as a sports agent. In his new role as director of talent recruitment at a sports agency, he is responsible for recruiting young footballers.

== Family and personal life ==
Gunn's wife, Susan, is a painter. She won the inaugural Sovereign Art Prize in 2008, which included a cash award of €25,000. According to The Daily Telegraph, before her marriage, Susan was "a beauty queen turned lingerie model" who "launched a fashion business". The couple met in Spain, where Susan had a bridal wear company, when Gunn was there on holiday. She told the Telegraph, "When I first met Bryan, I knew nothing about football and had no idea who he was because he told me he was a joiner." Gunn explained that he was unsure what her attitude would be to footballers; he later confessed his calling to her. He proposed within three days of their meeting, and they were married the following year. They lived in Framingham Pigot, near Norwich, until moving to Cheshire in May 2011, and now live in Alderley Edge.

The Gunns have had three children: Francesca, Melissa and Angus. Francesca died of leukaemia in October 1992, aged 2 years. Melissa is a model, while Angus is a footballer and plays in goal, like his father. On the books as a youth player at Norwich City, in October 2010 he was selected for England under-16s, a full year ahead of the age group. In July 2011, Angus joined Manchester City; he has "sharp reflexes and strong wrists" and an "ambitious streak". Angus rejoined Norwich on loan in June 2017, and then played for Southampton, before returning to Norwich. Angus also played for the England under-21 football team, but changed his international allegiance in March 2023 so he could play for Scotland.

According to Scotland on Sunday, Gunn suffers from ankylosing spondylitis, "a rheumatic spinal condition", diagnosed in about 1995, "which he controls with medication". He appeared in an ITV2 celebrity football quiz called "Taking the Pitch" in 1998, alongside singer Fish. Gunn's autobiography—In Where it Hurts—was published in 2006, and includes a foreword by his former manager Alex Ferguson. He said of writing the book, "it brought up a lot of good memories and a lot of awkward memories". The book was described by The Times as "shot through with sharp humour and astute observation". The publishers agreed to donate £1 to Gunn's Leukaemia appeal fund for every book sold.

=== Leukaemia appeal ===
In 1992, Gunn's two-year-old daughter, Francesca, was diagnosed with leukaemia. Norwich City fans were at first astonished by the sight of the goalkeeper running out with a completely shaven head. In the words of author and Norwich supporter, Kevin Baldwin, "Occasionally, the gap between the crowd and the players can cause unfortunate misunderstandings. A few months ago, Gunn shaved his head and we all laughed at him ... I was especially keen ... to shout "Baldy!" ... It now turns out that his daughter was undergoing chemotherapy at the time, which made her hair fall out. He shaved his head to show her that this was nothing to be ashamed of. Sorry, Bryan." When news spread of the reason for Gunn's shaven head, he received "support from the whole of the sporting world and the people of Norfolk".

Gunn describes the period of Francesca's illness and death and how it caused him to reflect on his career:

"We had a charmed life ... then Francesca became ill. There was a game in the autumn of '92 ... that we lost 7–1 at Blackburn. The team stayed in a bleak hotel and it rained endlessly. I just wanted to get back home. With hindsight you think, 'Why the bloody hell was I playing?' Very soon afterwards, Francesca died. She was sleeping between us. I realised what was happening and woke Susan. We cradled Francesca and cried."

Francesca died in 1992, aged two. Gunn played a match for Norwich against Queens Park Rangers at Carrow Road just days after his daughter died; he said of it, "When I ran out, I thought, wow, I could feel the whole stadium was with me. I never thought about packing it in." At the end of the season, Gunn won Norwich's Player of the Year award, as the club finished third in the Premiership, its highest ever league position.

Following Francesca's death, Gunn established "Bryan Gunn's Leukaemia Appeal", a fund to raise money to combat the disease. He initially set a target of £10,000, but by 2011 he has raised £1,000,000, under the auspices of The Dove Trust. The fund aims to address three issues:

"Equipping local hospitals to be better able to deal with children suffering from the disease on both in-patient and out-patient bases. Providing training for nurses and other staff involved in the care of children with leukaemia over and above that which is available from their employers. To support further research into the causes and cures of leukaemia."

The third of these ambitions has prompted the funding of research into leukaemia at the Norwich-based University of East Anglia. Gunn says:

"The ultimate aim is to find a cure and if that can be done in the laboratory at the University of East Anglia bearing Francesca's name, then it would be the biggest testimony of all. Norwich is now one of the leading centres for leukaemia research and, with links to computer systems around the world, hopefully we'll get there."

In addition to the research, Gunn set up a telephone support line that offers advice and assistance for parents of children who have leukaemia or other forms of cancer. Known as gaps:line (an acronym for Gunn Appeal Parent Support), the service quickly grew. From its initial pilot launch in Norfolk in early 2004, it expanded to cover the "eastern region" by the end of the year, and launched nationally in early 2006. The appeal has also funded other research and support work.

== Playing style, personality, achievements and legacy ==
As a player, Gunn was described as "a leader with a big presence" by his manager at Hibernian, Alex McLeish. Aberdeen manager Alex Ferguson recalls, "the first thing that hit me was his personality. It was abundantly clear ... that he was a warm, outgoing and endearing character", adding "He was a tremendous young keeper... always totally professional and I could never fault his discipline, effort or commitment."

Gunn had a "fantastic rapport with the Norwich supporters". As a player, he liked "to tease the crowd during the game". Before each half of a match, Gunn would run toward his goal and pretend to attempt to headbutt the crossbar. Gunn says this is a habit he began as a youngster, and cannot remember how or why he began to do it. Norwich fans noticed it soon after his arrival at the club and, in Gunn's words, "would wait until I got to about the 18-yard line and then start a small "Wooo..." which would build into a full-blown "WOOOO ... AH!" ... I loved it and came close to smacking my head against the woodwork a couple of times". During play, he would cup his ear, which would prompt shouts of "Bryan, Bryan, give us a wave".

Gunn is described as "a legend in Norwich", the result of his long years of service as player and official for the club. In 2002, he was made one of 25 inaugural members of the Norwich City Hall of Fame. A 2005 Football Focus fan poll for "Norwich's cult heroes" saw Gunn finish in first place. He polled 37% of votes, ahead of Robert Fleck and Iwan Roberts. Gunn is one of just nine players to have twice won Norwich City Player of the Year, in 1988 and 1993, and the only goalkeeper to do so. In 2003, as part of the Premier League 10 Seasons Awards, he was one of 10 players to be recognised by the Premier League with an "Outstanding Contribution to the Community" award. In response to his achievements with Norwich City and his charitable work, which has benefited the local university, in 2002 Gunn was made Sheriff of Norwich for the year by the City Council.

== Career statistics ==
Appearances and goals by club, season and competition
Club	Season	League			National cup (Note: Includes Scottish FA Cup, FA Cup)		League cup (Note: Includes Scottish League Cup, Football League Cup)		Europe		Total	
Club	Season	Division	Apps	Goals	Apps	Goals	Apps	Goals	Apps	Goals	Apps	Goals
Aberdeen	1982–83	Scottish Premier Division	1	0	0	0	0	0	0	0	1	0
Aberdeen	1983–84	Scottish Premier Division	0	0	0	0	0	0	0	0	0	0
Aberdeen	1984–85	Scottish Premier Division	2	0	0	0	0	0	0	0	2	0
Aberdeen	1985–86	Scottish Premier Division	9	0	1	0	2	0	1 (Note: Appearance in European Cup)	0	13	0
Aberdeen	1986–87	Scottish Premier Division	2	0	0	0	2	0	0	0	4	0
Aberdeen	Total		14	0	1	0	4	0	1	0	20	0
Norwich City	1986–87	Football League First Division	29	0	0	0	0	0	–		29	0
Norwich City	1987–88	Football League First Division	38	0	0	0	0	0	–		38	0
Norwich City	1988–89	Football League First Division	37	0	3	0	0	0	–		40	0
Norwich City	1989–90	Football League First Division	37	0	0	0	0	0	–		37	0
Norwich City	1990–91	Football League First Division	34	0	0	0	0	0	–		34	0
Norwich City	1991–92	Football League First Division	25	0	0	0	0	0	–		25	0
Norwich City	1992–93	Premier League	42	0	0	0	0	0	–		42	0
Norwich City	1993–94	Premier League	41	0	2	0	0	0	6 (Note: Appearances in UEFA Cup)	0	49	0
Norwich City	1994–95	Premier League	21	0	0	0	0	0	–		21	0
Norwich City	1995–96	Football League Division One	43	0	0	0	0	0	–		43	0
Norwich City	1996–97	Football League Division One	38	0	2	0	2	0	–		42	0
Norwich City	1997–98	Football League Division One	4	0	0	0	0	0	–		4	0
Norwich City	Total		389	0	7	0	2	0	6	0	404	0
Hibernian	1997–98	Scottish Premier Division	12	0	0	0	0	0	–		12	0
Career total			415	0	8	0	6	0	7	0	436	0

== Honours ==
Aberdeen

- European Cup Winners' Cup: 1982–83
- Scottish League Cup: 1985–86

Scotland U18

- UEFA European Under-18 Football Championship: 1982

Individual

- Barry Butler Trophy: 1988, 1993
- Norwich City F.C. Hall of Fame Inaugural Member: 2002

== Bibliography ==
- Baldwin, Kevin (1993). Norfolk 'n' Good: Supporter's View of Norwich City's Best-ever Season. Yellow Bird. ISBN 0-9522074-0-0.
- Gunn, Bryan; Piper, Kevin (2006). In Where it Hurts: My Autobiography. Vision Sports Publishing. ISBN 978-1-905326-00-6.
