= Jon Sheffield =

English footballer and coach

Personal information
- Full name: Jonathan Morgan Sheffield
- Date of birth: 1 February 1969 (age 57)
- Place of birth: Coventry, England
- Position: Goalkeeper

Senior career*
| Years | Team | Apps | (Gls) |
| 1987–1991 | Norwich City | 1 | (0) |
| 1989 | → Aldershot (loan) | 11 | (0) |
| 1990 | → Aldershot (loan) | 15 | (0) |
| 1991–1995 | Cambridge United | 56 | (0) |
| 1993 | → Colchester United (loan) | 6 | (0) |
| 1994 | → Swindon Town (loan) | 2 | (0) |
| 1994 | → Hereford United (loan) | 8 | (0) |
| 1995–1997 | Peterborough United | 62 | (0) |
| 1997–2001 | Plymouth Argyle | 158 | (0) |
| 2001–2004 | Yeovil Town | 22 | (0) |
- Saltash United
| Total | | 341 | (0) |
- * Club domestic league appearances and goals

Jonathan Morgan Sheffield (born 1 February 1969) is an English former professional football goalkeeper who has subsequently worked as a coach.

== Playing career ==
Born in Coventry, Sheffield came through the youth system at Norwich City, but made just one appearance for their first team when he deputised for the suspended Bryan Gunn in a 2–2 draw against Aston Villa at Carrow Road on 15 April 1989. While with Norwich, he had loan spells with Aldershot, Ipswich Town and Cambridge United before joining Cambridge on a permanent basis.

Whilst at Cambridge, Sheffield fought for the goalkeeper's shirt with John Vaughan and enjoyed success with the club as they reached the old Division Two, as he eventually made the number 1 shirt at Cambridge his own following the departure of John Vaughan and his replacement John Filan. While at Cambridge he had loan spells with Colchester United, Swindon Town and Hereford United. Whilst playing for Swindon Town in the Premier League against Aston Villa, Sheffield became the first player to wear the number 40 shirt in the Premier League. He was one of four goalkeepers used by Swindon throughout that season alongside Fraser Digby, Nick Hammond and Paul Heald.

After 56 performances for Cambridge he left the Abbey Stadium to join local rivals Peterborough United in a £150,000 transfer, where he played 62 games before moving to Plymouth Argyle for £100,000.

In 2001 Sheffield joined Yeovil Town on a free transfer and played 21 games, giving him a career total of 341 league appearances. He also represented Saltash United in Cornwall.

== Coaching career ==
In December 2010, Sheffield was announced as Yeovil Town's new goalkeeping coach as a replacement for Ben Roberts. He held his position for 3 months before Len Bond came in as a permanent Goalkeeping Coach at Yeovil.

== Honours ==
Yeovil Town

- FA Trophy: 2001–02
