= David Phillips (footballer) =

Wales international footballer (born 1963)

Personal information
- Full name: David Owen Phillips
- Date of birth: 29 July 1963 (age 63)
- Place of birth: Wegberg, West Germany
- Position: Midfielder

Senior career*
Years	Team	Apps	(Gls)
1981–1984	Plymouth Argyle	73	(15)
1984–1986	Manchester City	81	(13)
1986–1989	Coventry City	100	(8)
1989–1993	Norwich City	152	(18)
1993–1997	Nottingham Forest	126	(5)
1997–1999	Huddersfield Town	52	(3)
1999–2000	Lincoln City	17	(0)
2000–2001	Stevenage Borough	19	(1)
Total		620	(63)

International career
1984–1996	Wales	62	(2)
- * Club domestic league appearances and goals as of 11:00, 21 September 2007 (UTC)

David Owen Phillips (born 29 July 1963) is a Welsh football coach, commentator and former player.

As a player he was a defender / midfielder and played in the Premier League for both Norwich City and Nottingham Forest. During his first season at Norwich Phillips helped the club to a successful 3rd place finish narrowly missing out on second behind Aston Villa by two points. He was part of the squad that successfully managed qualification for the UEFA cup in the 92/93 season. He also featured several times for goal of the month award. At Forest he was awarded player of the year in 1994 and that very same season Forest got to the quarter finals of the UEFA cup losing 7-2 on aggregate to European giants Bayern München. He also had lengthy spells in the top flight for Manchester City he was awarded young player of the year in 1985 where they also got promoted to the top flight that same season. Phillips was also on the end of several goal of the month awards during his time at city. Coventry City saw Phillips biggest club honour winning the FA Cup in 1987 as they saw off Tottenham Hospur in extra time 3-2 at Wembley Stadium. Phillips also featured in the Football League for Huddersfield Town and Lincoln City. He retired in 2001 with non-league club Stevenage Borough. During his career he was capped 62 times by Wales, scoring twice.

== Club career ==
Phillips was a member of the Plymouth team that reached the semi-final of the FA Cup in 1984, losing 1–0 to Watford. Whilst at Manchester City he featured several times on the BBC's Match of the Day programme as a Goal of the Month nominee, scoring a number of spectacular long-range goals.

An early signing by George Curtis and John Sillett, Phillips was a useful player to have in any squad due to his versatility, as he could play on either flank both defensively and offensively. He was probably at his peak during the 86/87 FA Cup winning season, where the team spent the entire season in the top ten. As at Manchester City, Phillips was a strong industrious midfielder that could drop back into a defensive position if need be, but it was his long range striking ability which often caught the eye. Memorable goals include a 25-yard strike during a 4–1 defeat of QPR in 86/87 and the following season, going to then champions Everton, and scoring a pile-driver, again from outside the box, in a 2–1 win at Goodison Park. His 1987 FA Cup Final appearance typified his time at the Sky Blues, industrious, hard working and fast on the counterattack. His three seasons at Coventry (86–89) coincide with some of the most stable and successful times in the club's history.

The £550,000 fee that Norwich City paid Coventry for him in 1989 was at the time a club record. He scored within three minutes of his debut for the Canaries in a 2–0 win at Sheffield Wednesday. He was part of the Norwich side that finished third in the inaugural Premiership season 1992–93, but left the club in the summer of 1993 after a contract dispute, joining Nottingham Forest. He helped Forest win promotion to the Premiership in his first season at the City Ground, winning the club's Player of the Year award.

Following on from his spell at Forest, Phillips went on to play for Huddersfield Town and Lincoln City before retiring in 2001 with non-league side Stevenage Borough.

== International career ==
Phillips achieved caps at (6) U18 and (4) U21 level before making his senior debut for Wales on 2 May 1984 in a 1–0 Home Championship win over England, and soon become a regular for the national side. He was capped a total of 62 times for Wales, scoring twice. His last cap came on 24 January 1996 in a 3–0 friendly defeat to Italy.

== Coaching career ==
Following on from his retirement, Phillips coached the Coventry City under-14 team.

== Personal life ==
David's son Aaron Phillips is a professional footballer on the books of Kidderminster having previously played for Coventry City and had a loan spell at Nuneaton Town.

He now co-commentates for BBC Wales as a summariser on Swansea City, Cardiff City and Wrexham games.

== Honours ==
Manchester City

- Full Members' Cup runner-up: 1985–86

Coventry City

- FA Cup: 1986–87

Individual

- Manchester City Young Player of the Year: 1985
- Nottingham Forest Player of the Year: 1994

== Sources ==
- Mark Davage; John Eastwood; Kevin Platt (2001). Canary Citizens. Jarrold Publishing. ISBN 0-7117-2020-7.
