= Shaun Elliott =

English footballer

Personal information
- Full name: Shaun Elliott
- Date of birth: 26 January 1957 (age 69)
- Place of birth: Haltwhistle, England
- Height: 6 ft 0 in (1.83 m)
- Position: Defender

Senior career*
| Years | Team | Apps | (Gls) |
| 1975–1986 | Sunderland | 321 | (11) |
| 1981 | → Seattle Sounders (loan) | 21 | (4) |
| 1986–1988 | Norwich City | 31 | (2) |
| 1988–1990 | Blackpool | 67 | (0) |
| 1990–1992 | Colchester United | 56 | (1) |
| 1991 | Albany Capitals | 13 | (0) |

International career
| 1980–1981 | England B | 3 | (0) |
- * Club domestic league appearances and goals

Shaun Elliott (born 26 January 1957) is an English former professional footballer.

== Career ==
Elliott was a central defender who began his career with Sunderland before playing for Norwich City, Blackpool and Colchester United. He also played with the Seattle Sounders in the North American Soccer League. He ended his professional career in the United States in 1991, playing 13 times without scoring for the Albany Capitals in the American Professional Soccer League.

Elliott was captain at Sunderland and led them to the 1985 Milk Cup final, but missed the match through suspension. Sunderland lost the final to Norwich City, who went down to the Second Division with them that season.

While with Sunderland, Elliott won three caps for the England 'B' team.

== Honours ==
=== Club ===
Sunderland

- Football League Second Division Runner-up (1): 1979–80

Colchester United

- Football Conference Winner (1): 1991–92
- Football Conference Runner-up (1): 1990–91
