= David McNally (football executive) =

English football administrator

David McNally is the former chief executive of Norwich City Football Club. He was appointed on 12 June 2009, and replaced Neil Doncaster. McNally previously worked for Fulham and Celtic, following a career working for a number of blue-chip companies.

On 6 April 2014, McNally sacked Norwich's first team manager Chris Hughton, and replaced him with the clubs under 18's manager Neil Adams.

McNally appeared to resign in a Tweet on 7 May 2016 after Norwich lost 1-0 to Manchester United before sending another Tweet in which he stated he was "fully committed to the club". Both tweets were deleted some hours later, and he formally announced his resignation two days later.

On 29 October 2016, McNally said he was given £1.4m pay-off.
