= Ian Butterworth =

English footballer (born 1964)

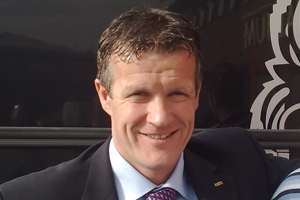
- Butterworth in 2008

Personal information
- Full name: Ian Stewart Butterworth
- Date of birth: 25 January 1964 (age 62)
- Place of birth: Crewe, England
- Height: 6 ft 1 in (1.85 m)
- Position: Defender

Team information
- Current team: Queens Park Rangers (chief scout)

Senior career*
Years	Team	Apps	(Gls)
1981–1985	Coventry City	90	(0)
1985–1986	Nottingham Forest	27	(0)
1986	→ Norwich City (loan)	4	(0)
1986–1994	Norwich City	231	(4)
1995	King's Lynn		
1996	Colorado Rapids	17	(0)
1997	IK Brage	11	(0)
1997	Stafford Rangers		
1998	Cobh Ramblers		
Total		363	(4)

International career
1984–1986	England U21	8	(1)

Managerial career
- 1997: IK Brage
- 1998: Cobh Ramblers
- 2009: Norwich City (caretaker manager)
- * Club domestic league appearances and goals

Ian Stewart Butterworth (born 25 January 1964) is an English former professional footballer, formerly assistant and caretaker manager at Norwich City. He is the chief scout at Queens Park Rangers.

== Playing career ==
Butterworth was a central defender who started his career at Coventry City then joined Nottingham Forest as part of a deal that also took future England international Stuart Pearce to Forest from Coventry. In September 1986 he joined Norwich City on loan before signing for the club permanently for a fee of £160,000 the following month.

He was a regular for eight years at Norwich in the centre of defence until knee injuries forced him to retire during the 1994–95 season. He played for the Canaries during what was arguably the finest part of their history so far. He helped them finish fifth in the league in his first season (a year after promotion), finish fourth and reach the FA Cup semi-finals in 1989, reach another FA Cup semi-final in 1992, finished a club best third in the new FA Premier League in 1993 and eliminate Bayern Munich from the UEFA Cup in his penultimate season.

An attempt to resurrect his career at Norwich's non-league Norfolk neighbours King's Lynn failed and Ian moved to the US to play for the Colorado Rapids in the new MLS for 1996.

Butterworth continued his career in Sweden with IK Brage (11 apps, 0 goals) and in September 1997 he became player-manager but was soon on his way back to England when he joined Stafford Rangers as a player. In the early part of 1998, he joined Cobh Ramblers as player-manager but had left within three months. This finally signalled the end of his career as a player.

In May 1998, he joined Darlington as assistant manager but resigned on 2 July 2000.

In October 2000, he joined Cardiff as assistant. He was there until Sam Hammam sacked him in 2004.

== Coaching career ==
In May 1998, Butterworth joined Dave Hodgson's Darlington as Assistant Manager. They led Darlington to a Wembley appearance in the Division Two play-offs in 1999–2000 but in a shock move, Hodgson and Butterworth resigned from their jobs on 2 July 2000, with Hodgson immediately replaced by Gary Bennett.

In October 2000, Butterworth was appointed as number 2 to Alan Cork at Cardiff City and this partnership was successful as Cardiff gained promotion to Division Two in April 2001. As assistant to Lennie Lawrance, he helped Cardiff into Division One in May 2003.

On 3 September 2004, Cardiff sacked Butterworth and fitness coach Clive Goodyear. Bluebirds owner Sam Hammam said a change was needed to give manager Lennie Lawrence a "right-hand man who is a super coach, a bit of an animal". Hammam added: "Lennie is the right manager for Cardiff City, we will not change that. But maybe it's time to change things around." Early speculation linked former Wimbledon manager and current Watford coach Terry Burton with the role. In 2004, Norwich supporters voted Butterworth into the club's Hall of Fame.

He had a stint as coach at Bristol Rovers and the FA before joining Hartlepool United as reserve team manager. He then worked for the Football Association, including a stint at the World Cup in Germany 2006 before joining Hartlepool as Reserve Team Manager in early July 2006. "It's a fantastic appointment for the club," Pools boss Danny Wilson told his club's website."I am sure he is going to be a real asset for us. The fact that he has been to the World Cup helping the FA speaks volumes," he added

In February 2009, Butterworth was appointed Assistant Manager at Norwich City, working alongside new manager Bryan Gunn, a former team-mate. He was made caretaker manager after Gunn's sacking in August, but he resigned on 19 August shortly after the appointment of new manager Paul Lambert.

In early October 2010, Butterworth was reported to have been interviewed for the vacant Lincoln City manager's position, available since Chris Sutton quit at the end of September 2010, but lost out.

Since leaving Norwich, Butterworth has helped his old Coventry and Forest teammate Stuart Pearce by scouting England Under-21s opponents. In June 2011, he was linked with the vacancy at Torquay.

== Managerial statistics ==
As of 18 August 2009.

Team	From	To	Record				
Team	From	To	G	W	L	D	Win %
Norwich City	13 August 2009	19 August 2009	1	0	1	0	0
Total			1	0	1	0	0

Sporting positions
Preceded by Mike Phelan	Norwich City Captain; 1989–1991	Succeeded by Mark Bowen
Preceded by Mark Bowen	Norwich City Captain; 1992–1994	Succeeded by Jon Newsome
