= Dale Gordon =

English footballer (born 1967)

Personal information
- Full name: Dale Andrew Gordon
- Date of birth: 9 January 1967 (age 59)
- Place of birth: Caister, England
- Height: 5 ft 10 in (1.78 m)
- Position: Right winger

Senior career*
Years	Team	Apps	(Gls)
1984–1991	Norwich City	206	(31)
1991–1993	Rangers	45	(6)
1993–1996	West Ham United	9	(1)
1995	→ Peterborough United (loan)	6	(1)
1996	→ Millwall (loan)	6	(0)
1996–1997	AFC Bournemouth	16	(0)
1998	Gorleston		
Total		288	(39)

International career
1983–1984	England U17	8	(3)
1985	England Youth	1	(0)
1987	England U21	4	(1)
1991	England B	2	(0)

Managerial career
- 1997–1998: Great Yarmouth Town
- 1999–2000: Gorleston
- * Club domestic league appearances and goals

Dale Andrew Gordon (born 9 January 1967) is a former professional association footballer who played predominantly as a right-sided midfielder for Norwich City, Rangers, West Ham United, Peterborough United, Millwall and AFC Bournemouth.

== Early life ==
Born in Caister, Norfolk, Gordon grew up as an Ipswich Town supporter and has said that he cried when watching the 1978 FA Cup Final on television in which Ipswich beat Arsenal 1–0.

== Playing career ==
=== Norwich City ===
Gordon signed for Town's rivals Norwich City and made his league debut for them on 25 August 1984 in a 3–3 draw against Liverpool.

His first goal for Norwich came on 10 November 1984 in a 3–0 win against Luton Town. Gordon made 27 appearances during that 1984–85 season. He found first-team opportunities limited during the following 1985–86 season but did score the goal that secured the Division 2 championship for Norwich in a 1–1 draw against Stoke City on 19 April 1986.

1986–87 was Gordon's breakthrough season. He established himself as a first-team regular and played 41 league games as a vital part of the team that recorded what was then their best ever league finish of fifth position – though he was denied the chance to play in the UEFA Cup due to the ban on English clubs in European competitions arising from the Heysel disaster of 1985. Gordon was capped by England under 21s towards the end of the campaign, but hampered his chances of future selection when he and his Norwich City teammate Robert Rosario broke curfew while away with the under 21s and went to a nightclub. Gordon was later capped twice for the England B team, but never played for his country at senior level.

In December 1988, Gordon achieved "a unique place in Norwich City history – a record nobody can ever take away. He was the first player to score in a live televised Football League match involving the Canaries", a 2–1 win over West Ham.

The 1988–89 season ended with Gordon being voted Norwich City player of the year as the team finished fourth in the league and reached the semi-finals of the FA Cup, though again he and his colleagues were deprived of UEFA Cup action as the ban on English clubs in European competitions was still in force. In total, Gordon played 261 games for Norwich (the majority of which were as a right-sided midfielder) between his 1984 debut and his final appearance on 2 November 1991. After the match against Nottingham Forest on 2 November 1991, he signed for Scottish club Rangers for a fee of £1,200,000.

=== Rangers ===
Gordon scored twice on his debut for Rangers against Dunfermline Athletic and went on to win two Scottish Championships, the Scottish Cup and the Scottish League Cup.

=== West Ham United ===
Gordon joined West Ham United for £750,000 on 8 July 1993, but his career at Upton Park was disrupted by injuries. He did, however, score West Ham's first ever goal in the Premier League, in a 1–1 draw against Coventry City, on 21 August 1993 at Highfield Road, his only West Ham goal. In just over three years he made only 11 appearances in all competitions for West Ham and had a six-game loan period, in 1996, at Millwall before leaving to join AFC Bournemouth in August 1996 on a free transfer. In 1996, Gordon expressed a desire to return to Norwich City, but his injuries got the better of him and he retired as a professional player in February 1997.

== Coaching career ==
After retiring from playing Gordon set up an academy in the Great Yarmouth and Lowestoft area. He was appointed manager of Great Yarmouth Town in May 1997, before becoming Director of Football at Gorleston in November 1998. He made a brief playing comeback, before being appointed manager in 1999.

In 2000, he left Gorleston and set up an Ipswich Town academy in Lowestoft. He later started an independent football school, before returning to Great Yarmouth Town as Director of Football in October 2007. In 2013, he was appointed Director of Football at IFA Sport in the United Arab Emirates.

== Business ==
In 2008, Gordon was running "Legends" lounge bar at Great Yarmouth Town FC and his own soccer academy.

== Personal life ==
In 2007, Gordon mentioned in a newspaper interview that his young son Remy is training with Norwich and on 29 July 2009 it was confirmed that Remy Gordon signed a scholarship with Norwich City Football Club, following in his father's footsteps.

== Honours ==
In 2002, Norwich supporters voted Gordon into the Norwich City Hall of Fame.

Rangers

- Scottish Premier Division: 1991–92, 1992–93

- Scottish Cup: 1991–92
- Scottish League Cup: 1992–93
