= Jason Minett =

English footballer

Personal information
- Full name: Jason Keith Minett
- Date of birth: 12 August 1971 (age 55)
- Place of birth: Peterborough, England
- Height: 5 ft 10 in (1.78 m)
- Position: Defender

Youth career
- 1988–1990: Norwich City

Senior career*
Years	Team	Apps	(Gls)
1990–1993	Norwich City	3	(0)
1993–1995	Exeter City	88	(3)
1995–1997	Lincoln City	46	(5)
1996–1998	Exeter City	19	(0)
	Doncaster Rovers	58	(4)
1998–2000	Boston United	9	(1)
2000–2001	King's Lynn	23	(1)
2001–2002	→Stocksbridge Park Steels (loan)	?	(?)
2001–2002	Grantham Town	58	(2)
2001–2004	Lincoln United	?	(?)
2004–2007	Grantham Town	30	(2)
- * Club domestic league appearances and goals

Jason Minett (born 12 August 1971) is a former professional football defender who began his career with Norwich City.

His Carrow Road career was limited by injuries, although he went on to play for Exeter city and Lincoln City in the Football League. In 1998, he dropped into non-league football joining Doncaster Rovers and then Boston United. His career at Boston stalled when he suffered a broken leg in the 3–0 FA Trophy victory over Tamworth on 13 January 2001. Regaining fitness, he joined King's Lynn ahead of the 2001–02 season. In January 2002, he joined Stocksbridge Park Steels on loan. In April 2002, he moved on to Grantham Town, agreeing a contract for the following two seasons. In the summer of 2004, Minett joined up with his former Grantham manager John Wilkinson at Lincoln United. Wilkinson moved back to manage Grantham in June 2007 and Minett soon followed him to the Gingerbreads. Minett retired from football in June 2008 following Grantham's unsuccessful bid for promotion.
