= Jeremy Goss =

Footballer (born 1965)

Personal information
- Full name: Jeremy Goss
- Date of birth: 11 May 1965 (age 61)
- Place of birth: Dhekelia, Akrotiri and Dhekelia, Cyprus
- Height: 5 ft 9 in (1.75 m)
- Position: Midfielder

Youth career
- 198x–1983: Norwich City

Senior career*
| Years | Team | Apps | (Gls) |
| 1983–1996 | Norwich City | 188 | (14) |
| 1996–1997 | Hearts | 10 | (0) |
| 1997–1998 | Colchester United | 0 | (0) |
| 1998–1999 | King's Lynn | 21 | (0) |
| Total | | 198 | (14) |

International career
| 1991–1996 | Wales | 9 | (0) |
- * Club domestic league appearances and goals

Jeremy Goss (born 11 May 1965) is a football coach and former professional player who played as a midfielder.

He is most noted for playing for Norwich City from 1984 to 1996, which saw several seasons in the Premier League as well as featuring in the UEFA Cup. He came to prominence during their successful period in the mid-1990s, and was known for scoring spectacularly but not often, and was noted for his superior volleying skills and high level of stamina. He also played in the Scottish Premier League for Hearts, in the Football League for Colchester United and in non-league football with King's Lynn. Born in Cyprus, he was capped nine times by Wales.

== Club career ==
Goss attended Pent Valley Secondary School in Folkestone and represented Kent Schools at football. He also played for England Schools at under-18 level. He was a member of Norwich City's FA Youth Cup winning team in 1983. Of his early years at the club, he speaks of having to do the traditional apprentice roles, including getting the sandwiches for the senior players' lunch, adding that, "...if you got it wrong, you got a bollocking.."

Goss, nicknamed "Gossa", a reference to Paul Gascoigne, was mostly a squad or bench player up until the 1990–91 season where he became more regular in the starting lineup. His vastly improving form earned him a callup to the Welsh international team, and the start of the Premier League coincided with Goss's and Norwich's most productive period in the top flight in 1992–93. His stunning volleyed goal against Leeds United at Elland Road in the opening month of the 1993–94 season was voted "Goal of the month" on Match of the Day, and to this day he describes it as technically the best goal he ever scored. Goss scored six league goals during Norwich's first European season.

Goss scored spectacularly, most notably in Norwich City's away win over Bayern Munich in the UEFA Cup in 1993, the first time that an English side had ever beaten Bayern at their home ground; now frequently cited as Norwich's most famous win and goal and he scored again in the 1–1 return leg which put Norwich through to the next round. "There's no doubt Bayern assumed it would be easy."

He also has the distinction of scoring the last goal in front of the terraced Spion Kop at Anfield. He was awarded a testimonial during the 1993–94 season, which fittingly became his most successful season with the club.

Goss remained a regular until Norwich were relegated from the Premiership in the 1994–95 season. Upon Martin O'Neill's appointment as Norwich manager in 1995–96, Goss was initially dropped into the reserves as the new manager was looking to trim the "Premier League" wage bill. He was later recalled and scored a spectacular goal on his return against Derby County.

All told, Goss made 188 league appearances for Norwich, scoring 14 goals. After leaving Norwich in 1996, Goss had spells at Heart of Midlothian and Colchester United before signing for local non-league side King's Lynn. Goss retired from playing in 1999, and then worked for Norwich City as a community ambassador until January 2010, when the post was terminated; Goss declined an alternative role in the club's Football in the Community team.

== International career ==
Goss made his senior debut for Wales in a 1–0 friendly win over Iceland at Cardiff Arms Park. The last of his nine senior caps for Wales came five years later on 2 June 1996 in a 5–0 win in San Marino at the start of the 1998 World Cup qualifiers. Goss was also on the pitch for one of the most disappointing matches in the history of Welsh international football, on 17 November 1993, when a Paul Bodin penalty miss ended hopes of playing at the 1994 World Cup as Wales lost 2–1 to Romania in their final World Cup qualifying game at Cardiff Arms Park.

Jerry also represented England Schoolboys at Under 18 level before joining Norwich City FC.

== Coaching career ==
In March 2010, Goss returned to Norwich City to assist reserve team manager Ian Crook.

== Personal life ==
Goss' wife Margaret gave birth to identical twins, three months premature. "Within two hours of birth their weight had gone down to 2lb and it was touch and go. We lived in the hospital for six weeks and it was an emotional time when we took them home for the first time a few days before Christmas. Now they look like any normal seven-month-old babies and for that we are very grateful."

Goss, whose father having served in the British Army, is also a member of the Forces2Canaries Supporters Group. In 2002, Norwich fans voted Goss into the club's Hall of Fame.

Goss worked with author Edward Couzens-Lake on his life story. Gossy: The Autobiography (Amberley Publishing) which was published in August 2014.

Moving on from his association with Norwich City football club, Goss continues to deliver his own; humorous after dinner speeches, student development and as a Leadership and Motivational programmes.

Goss spent some time in support of the Norfolk and Norwich Association of the Blind (www.NNAB.org.uk), raising funds to provide the range of services to the Blind people of Norwich and Norfolk. This culminated in the 1300 mile sponsored bicycle ride, retracing the 1993 Norwich City European Cup run from Norwich to Vitesse Arnham, to Bayern Munich, to Inter Milan.

In 2019, Jeremy joined Age UK Norwich (www.ageuknorwich.org.uk) as Corporate Relationship Manager, organising golf days, fundraising challenges and corporate events. Age UK Norwich is an independent charity with a mission to improve the quality of later life by working with Norwich residents to create an age friendly and inclusive city where they can thrive and be supported by opportunity and services that enhance and protect their health and wellbeing.

In January 2024, Goss was involved in a car crash in Norfolk. He sustained injuries to his ribs, kidneys, lower back and hip in the crash.

== Honours ==
- FA Youth Cup winner 1983
