= Dave Stringer =

English footballer and manager

Personal information
- Full name: David Stringer
- Date of birth: 15 October 1944 (age 82)
- Place of birth: Great Yarmouth, England
- Position: Central defender

Youth career
- Gorleston

Senior career*
| Years | Team | Apps | (Gls) |
| 1964–1976 | Norwich City | 419 | (18) |
| 1976–1980 | Cambridge United | 157 | (1) |
| Total | | 576 | (19) |

Managerial career
- 1987–1992: Norwich City
- * Club domestic league appearances and goals

David Stringer (born 15 October 1944) is an English former footballer and manager of Norwich City.

As a player, he won the fans' vote to be Norwich City player of the year in 1972, the same year that they won promotion to the First Division for the first time, as Second Division champions, and made a total of 499 appearances for the club. He ended his playing career with Cambridge United before returning to Norwich city to coach the youth team, winning the FA Youth Cup in 1984. He went on to manage the reserve team and was appointed first team manager in December 1987 following the sacking of Ken Brown.

He saved Norwich from relegation that season, and in his first full season (1988–89) Norwich emerged as an unlikely contender for the league title and FA Cup; they finished fourth in the league and reached the semi-finals of the FA Cup. Norwich reached another FA Cup semi-final in 1992, narrowly avoided relegation that season. Stringer then resigned.

During his management, Norwich had one of its most successful spells but never again would he hold another managerial position; he returned to Carrow Road as a member of the coaching staff.

He is the grandfather of British athlete Sophie McKinna.

== Honours ==
Norwich City

- Football League Cup runner-up: 1972–73, 1974–75
