= Robert Rosario =

English footballer (born 1966)

Personal information
- Full name: Robert Michael Rosario
- Date of birth: 4 March 1966 (age 60)
- Place of birth: London, England
- Height: 6 ft 3 in (1.91 m)
- Position: Forward

Youth career
- Harrow Borough
- Hillingdon Borough

Senior career*
Years	Team	Apps	(Gls)
1983–1991	Norwich City	126	(18)
1985	→ Wolverhampton Wanderers (loan)	2	(1)
1991–1993	Coventry City	59	(8)
1993–1996	Nottingham Forest	27	(3)
1996	→ Greensboro Dynamo (loan)	0	(0)
1997	Carolina Dynamo	24	(3)
1998	Charleston Battery	22	(0)
1999–2000	Carolina Dynamo	11	(1)
Total		271	(34)

International career
1985	England U19	3	(0)
1987	England U21	4	(0)

Managerial career
- 2001: Carolina Dynamo
- * Club domestic league appearances and goals

Robert Michael Rosario (born 4 March 1966) is an English football coach and former professional player. He has represented England at youth level internationally.

As a player, he was a forward who notably played in the top flight of English football for Norwich City, Coventry City and Nottingham Forest, with appearances in the Premier League for both the Sky Blues and The Reds. He also played for Wolverhampton Wanderers and later finished his career in the United States with Greensboro Dynamo, Carolina Dynamo and Charleston Battery. Rosario was the first British Asian to play in the Premier League.

== Playing career ==
Rosario started his career in non-league football, joining Hillingdon Borough from Harrow Borough in August 1983 at the age of 17. Five goals in nine Southern League starts alerted scouts and in December 1983, he joined Norwich City. He made 161 appearances in six seasons and scored 29 goals.

Rosario signed for Coventry City for £600,000 by Terry Butcher in April 1991 he was seen to be the successor to Cyrille Regis.

It was in his second season after the arrival of a new manager, Bobby Gould and a new striker, Micky Quinn, that Rosario began to feature more, providing many chances for Quinn who notched 17 goals in 26 games in the 1992–93 season. In March 1993, with City's financial situation worsening he was sold to Nottingham Forest for £450,000. His last appearance for Forest came in April 1994, as injuries took hold, and although he was fully fit for the 1995–96 season, he was no longer part of Clark's plans at the City Ground and left at the end of the season, signalling the end of his playing career by the age of 30.

After his move to Forest he struggled to win a regular place and suffered a serious knee injury which eventually forced his retirement from the professional game in England.

In February 1997, he joined the Carolina Dynamos of the USA's Second Division, the A-League, for whom he made 29 appearances, scoring four goals. In April 1998, he joined another A League side, the Charleston Battery from South Carolina.

== International career ==
Rosario has represented the England U21 team in 1987.

== Coaching career ==
Rosario had a spell in charge of Carolina Dynamo in 2001.

== Personal life ==
Born in England, Rosario is of Anglo-Indian descent from his father's side and German descent from his mother's side. Rosario's father was born in Calcutta and was a cyclist and bodybuilder. He became the first British Asian to play in the Premier League when he started for Coventry City against Middlesbrough on 15 August 1992 (this was previously attributed to Jimmy Carter who played later in the opening weekend of the new competition).

Rosario resides in North Carolina, where he has coached at the North Meck Soccer club.

His son Gabriel is a former Reading and Huddersfield Town youth team goalkeeper.

== Sources ==
- Mike Davage, John Eastwood, Kevin Platt (2001). Canary Citizens. Jarrold Publishing. ISBN 0-7117-2020-7.
