= Mark Bowen (footballer) =

Welsh footballer & coach (born 1963)

Personal information
- Full name: Mark Rosslyn Bowen
- Date of birth: 7 December 1963 (age 62)
- Place of birth: Neath, Wales
- Height: 5 ft 8 in (1.73 m)
- Positions: Left back; midfielder

Team information
- Current team: Forest Green Rovers (director of football)

Youth career
- 1980–1981: Tottenham Hotspur

Senior career*
Years	Team	Apps	(Gls)
1981–1987	Tottenham Hotspur	17	(2)
1987–1996	Norwich City	321	(24)
1996–1997	West Ham United	17	(1)
1997	Shimizu S-Pulse	7	(3)
1997–1999	Charlton Athletic	42	(0)
1999	Wigan Athletic	7	(0)
1999	Reading	0	(0)
Total		411	(30)

International career
1982–1983	Wales U21	3	(0)
1986–1997	Wales	41	(3)

Managerial career
- 2001: Crystal Palace U23s
- 2012: Queens Park Rangers (caretaker)
- 2019–2020: Reading
- 2022: AFC Wimbledon (interim)
- * Club domestic league appearances and goals

Mark Rosslyn Bowen (born 7 December 1963) is a Welsh football manager and former professional footballer. He is currently the director of football at Forest Green Rovers.

Bowen enjoyed a playing career from 1981 to 1991 playing primarily as a left-back. He spent most of his career with Norwich City, and also represented sides including West Ham United, Charlton Athletic, and Tottenham Hotspur. He made 41 senior appearances for Wales, scoring 3 goals.

After retiring, Bowen moved into coaching and worked extensively as an assistant to Mark Hughes during his time managing Wales, Blackburn Rovers, Manchester City, Fulham, Queens Park Rangers, Stoke City and Southampton. Bowen was head coach and manager of Reading during the 2019–20 season, caretaker manager at Queens Park Rovers, and held a senior football operations role at Reading before becoming director of football at Forest Green Rovers.

== Playing career ==
=== Tottenham Hotspur ===
Bowen joined Tottenham Hotspur as an apprentice in 1980, signing his first professional contract in December 1981. He made 21 first-team appearances in all competitions and was part of Tottenham's squad during their 1984 UEFA Cup-winning campaign.

=== Norwich City ===
In the summer of 1987, Norwich City manager Ken Brown signed Bowen from Tottenham Hotspur for £90,000. Bowen made his debut for the Canaries on 19 August 1987 in a league match against Southampton at Carrow Road. He scored his first goal for Norwich City against West Ham United on New Year's Day 1988 in a 4–1 win at home in the first division.

Bowen initially played on the left of midfield before establishing himself as Norwich's first-choice left-back. In the 1989–90 season he finished as the team's joint top league goalscorer. That season, he also collected the Barry Butler Memorial Trophy when the supporters voted him Norwich City player of the year.

On 8 April 1989, Bowen was involved in an unusual incident in a match against Coventry City at Highfield Road. Goalkeeper Bryan Gunn was sent off for arguing with the referee after he had awarded Coventry a penalty kick. Bowen went in goal to replace him, only for Coventry's specialist penalty taker Brian Kilcline to miss the spot-kick by putting it wide. Coventry won 2–1. Bowen was chosen to represent the Barclays Division One representative side v Italy Serie A in Naples in January 1991. Italy Serie A won 3-0 with goals from Van Basten, Careca and Diego Simeone.

Bowen was a member of the Norwich side that finished third in the inaugural FA Premier League season in 1992–93 and qualified for the UEFA Cup. In the second round of the 1993-94 competition, he scored Norwich's second goal in a 2-1 away win over FC Bayern Munichz, at the time the only British side to have defeated the German side at their own stadium.

Norwich were relegated from the Premier League at the end of the 1994–95 season. Bowen made his final appearances for the club during the following season and was released in 1996 as Norwich reduced its costs amid financial difficulties. He left after making 399 appearances in all competitions.

He is a member of the Norwich City F.C. Hall of Fame, and was also named in a 2002 poll marking Norwich City's centenary, supporters selected Bowen as the club's greatest left-back and included him in an all-time XI.

=== Later playing career ===
After leaving Carrow Road, Bowen signed for West Ham United making his debut appearance on 21 August 1996 in a 1–1 home draw against Coventry City. He made 20 appearances for the club all competitions scoring one goal in a 2–0 away win against Nottingham Forest on 21 September.

In January 1997 he signed for Shimizu S-Pulse in Japan, again on a free transfer. He signed for Charlton Athletic later that year for the start of the 1997–98 season. He was a member of the Charlton side that won promotion to the Premiership at the end of that season after a memorable play-off final against Sunderland at Wembley ended 4–4. Charlton won the penalty shoot-out, with Bowen scoring one of the spot-kicks. He had previously scored just twice from the spot for Norwich, against Notts County and Queens Park Rangers respectively.

Bowen left Charlton in 1999 and subsequently had brief spells with Wigan Athletic and Reading before retiring.

== International career ==
Bowen made his senior debut for Wales on 10 May 1986, aged 22, in a 2–0 friendly defeat to Canada in North America. His final Wales appearance came 11 years later on 11 February 1997 in a goalless friendly draw with the Republic of Ireland at Cardiff Arms Park. He was capped 41 times as a full international for Wales, scoring three goals.

== Coaching career ==
=== Early coaching roles ===
Bowen began his coaching career while at Reading, when Wales manager Mark Hughes appointed him as an assistant manager. He later joined former Norwich teammate Steve Bruce's coaching staff at Crystal Palace and Birmingham City.

In 2002 Birmingham won promotion to the Premier League via the play-offs, defeating Norwich on penalties after a 1–1 draw in regular time. Bowen remained at Birmingham for two more years taking them to 10th position in the Premier League before leaving in the summer of 2004.

Bowen returned to the Wales coaching staff in August 2004. The move caused some controversy as Hughes appointed Bowen without the knowledge of the Football Association of Wales. Bowen obtained the UEFA Pro Licence in 2004 as part of the first course held in England.

=== Assistant managerial work ===
==== Blackburn Rovers ====
After Hughes was appointed Blackburn Rovers manager in September 2004, Bowen joined him as assistant manager. Whilst at Blackburn, Bowen was linked with the managerial vacancy at West Brom, Norwich City and Swansea City.

==== Manchester City ====
In June 2008, Bowen followed Hughes to Manchester City as assistant manager, and left the club with him in December 2009 with club sitting 3rd in Premier League and in semi final of League Cup. Hughes and Bowen were sacked in December 2009, sar sixth in the league with only two wins. The new owners Abu Dhabi United Group replaced Hughes with Roberto Mancini.

==== Fulham and QPR ====
In August 2010, Bowen again followed Hughes, to become his assistant at Fulham. The managerial duo achieved an eighth place finish in the league but turned down contract offers to stay at the club. Newspapers claimed that Hughes had turned down Fulham due to interest in the role to succeed Gerard Houllier at Aston Villa, a claim he denied instead citing his "ambition... was not being matched" by Fulham.

Bowen worked with Hughes at Queens Park Rangers for a year, saving the club from relegation from the Premier League in 2011. Hughes was sacked in November 2012. Bowen took caretaker charge of QPR for one match against Manchester United in a 3–1 defeat.

==== Stoke City ====
Bowen then joined Hughes at Stoke City in June 2013. Three top ten Premier League finishes followed, taking Stoke City to its highest ever position in Premier League. He remained at Stoke until January 2018.

==== Southampton ====
Bowen joined Hughes as part of the Southampton managerial team upon appointment in March 2018, initially on a contract for the remainder of the 2017–18 season. In May 2018, after successfully steering Southampton to Premier League safety, it was announced that Bowen had signed a new long-term contract. On 3 December 2018, he was dismissed alongside Mark Hughes.

=== AFC Wimbledon ===
On 30 March 2022, Bowen was appointed manager of League One club AFC Wimbledon until the end of the season with the club sitting in 21st position, one point from safety with seven matches remaining, and without a win for nearly four months. Despite an improvement in form, he was unable to arrest the losing run, the team were relegated and he left the club.

== Executive career ==
=== Reading ===
On 27 March 2019, Bowen was hired as a technical consultant for Reading. He was announced as the club's sporting director on 21 August, and succeeded José Gomes as manager on 14 October. Prior to being appointed manager he had been tasked with drawing up a shortlist of candidates for the job he eventually was offered. On 17 January 2020, Bowen extended his contract until the end of the 2020–2021 season. Bowen took Reading from 23rd in the Championship table to 14th. On 29 August 2020, Bowen was replaced as manager by Veljko Paunović, and despite being offered a new role by the club as sport director, his departure from Reading was confirmed on 31 August 2020.

Bowen returned to Reading in May 2022 as head of football operations and left in September 2024.

=== Forest Green Rovers ===
In June 2025, Bowen joined National League side Forest Green Rovers as Director of Football.

== Personal life ==
Bowen is married to wife Karen since 1986. They have three children. His daughter Daniella is an accomplished actress with London West End lead credits to her name.

Bowen's son was Head of Performance at Reading Football Club during his father's time at the club, and joined him in December 2025 at Forest Green Rovers.

His son Jackson is a Lead Recruitment Analyst at Reading.

In May 2024, Bowen was charged by the Football Association concerning alleged breaches of betting rules. The charge related to bets placed on football matches between April 2022 to January 2024, none of which related to Reading FC. The FA announced the punishment of 4 weeks suspension from football in their decision in August 2024.

Bowen completed the London Marathon in 2020 in aid of Guide Dogs for the Blind Charity.

== Career statistics ==
- Sourced from Mark Bowen at the English National Football Archive (subscription required)

=== Club ===
Club	Season	League			FA Cup		League Cup		Other^{[A]}		Total	
Club	Season	Division	Apps	Goals	Apps	Goals	Apps	Goals	Apps	Goals	Apps	Goals
Tottenham Hotspur	1983–84	First Division	7	0	3	0	0	0	0	0	9	0
Tottenham Hotspur	1984–85	First Division	6	0	0	0	0	0	0	0	6	0
Tottenham Hotspur	1985–86	First Division	2	1	0	0	0	0	1	0	3	0
Tottenham Hotspur	1986–87	First Division	2	1	0	0	0	0	0	0	2	1
Tottenham Hotspur	Total		17	2	3	0	0	0	1	0	21	2
Norwich City	1987–88	First Division	24	1	2	0	3	1	2	0	31	2
Norwich City	1988–89	First Division	35	2	6	0	3	0	1	0	45	2
Norwich City	1989–90	First Division	38	7	4	0	3	0	2	0	47	7
Norwich City	1990–91	First Division	37	1	4	0	2	0	5	0	48	1
Norwich City	1991–92	First Division	36	3	4	1	5	0	1	0	46	4
Norwich City	1992–93	Premier League	42	1	2	0	3	0	0	0	47	1
Norwich City	1993–94	Premier League	41	5	2	0	4	0	6	1	53	6
Norwich City	1994–95	Premier League	36	2	3	0	5	0	0	0	44	2
Norwich City	1995–96	First Division	31	2	1	0	6	0	0	0	38	2
Norwich City	Total		320	24	28	1	34	1	17	1	399	27
West Ham United	1996–97	Premier League	17	1	0	0	3	0	0	0	20	1
Shimizu S-Pulse	1997	J.League	7	3	0	0	0	0	0	0	7	3
Charlton Athletic	1997–98	First Division	36	0	3	0	0	0	3	0	42	0
Charlton Athletic	1998–99	Premier League	6	0	0	0	0	0	0	0	6	0
Charlton Athletic	Total		42	0	3	0	0	0	3	0	48	0
Wigan Athletic	1999–2000	Second Division	7	0	0	0	3	0	0	0	10	0
Reading	1999–2000	Second Division	0	0	0	0	0	0	1	0	1	0
Career Total			410	30	34	1	40	1	22	1	506	33

A. The "Other" column constitutes appearances and goals in the Football League Trophy, Football League play-offs and Full Members Cup, Screen Sport Super Cup and UEFA Cup.

=== International ===
Wales national team
Year	Apps	Goals
1986	2	0
1987	0	0
1988	2	0
1989	6	1
1990	1	0
1991	3	0
1992	8	2
1993	3	0
1994	4	0
1995	6	0
1996	5	0
1997	1	0
Total	41	3

=== Managerial ===
As of match played 30 April 2022

Coaching record by team and tenure
Team	From	To	Record					Ref.
Team	From	To	P	W	D	L	Win %	Ref.
Queens Park Rangers (caretaker)	23 November 2012	24 November 2012	1	0	0	1	0.00	Ref.
Reading	14 October 2019	29 August 2020	43	16	12	15	37.21	
AFC Wimbledon	30 March 2022	7 May 2022	7	0	4	3	0.00	
Total			51	16	16	19	31.37	—

== Honours ==
Tottenham Hotspur

- UEFA Cup: 1983–84

Charlton Athletic

- Football League First Division play-offs: 1998

Individual

- Norwich City Player of the Year: 1990
