= Ian Crook =

English footballer & coach

Personal information
- Full name: Ian Stuart Crook
- Date of birth: 18 January 1963 (age 63)
- Place of birth: Romford, England
- Height: 5 ft 8 in (1.73 m)
- Position: Midfielder

Youth career
- 1976–1980: Tottenham Hotspur

Senior career*
Years	Team	Apps	(Gls)
1980–1986	Tottenham Hotspur	39	(1)
1986–1997	Norwich City	418	(24)
1997–1998	Sanfrecce Hiroshima	24	(4)
1998–2000	Northern Spirit	34	(6)
Total		515	(35)

International career
1987	England B	1	(0)

Managerial career
- 2001–2004: Newcastle Jets
- 2004: American Samoa
- 2010–2012: NSWIS
- 2012: Sydney FC
- * Club domestic league appearances and goals

Ian Stuart Crook (born 18 January 1963) is an English football manager and former professional player.

As a player, he was a midfielder who began his career with Tottenham Hotspur. before making 418 appearances for Norwich City where he notably played in the Premier League and UEFA Cup. He finished his career with spells in Japan and Australia with Sanfrecce Hiroshima and Northern Spirit. He won one cap in 1987 as an England B international.

After his playing career Crook went into coaching, mostly in Australia, with Newcastle Jets and NSWIS. He was serving as manager of A-League club Sydney FC in 2012, before joining the Western Sydney Wanderers football club as Assistant Manager. In 2004 he also had a spell as national team manager of American Samoa.

== Club career ==
Crook began his football career at Tottenham Hotspur signing with the club as a schoolboy in 1976. He made his debut in 1980 against Liverpool and stayed with the North London club for another six years. He found it difficult to break into the first team, as the Tottenham midfield at the time contained Glenn Hoddle and Ossie Ardiles. He would, however, receive a UEFA Cup Medal in 1984 as an unused substitute for the final, in which Tottenham beat R.S.C. Anderlecht on penalties. He appeared in the semifinal against Hajduk.

In 1986 Crook moved to Norwich City for a fee of £80,000, which would prove to be one of the best bargain buys for the club. He was at the hub of the most successful team in Norwich's history. During his eleven seasons at the club, he helped them to three top five finishes in England's top division and played in the club's UEFA Cup run in the 1993–94 season, though he missed the match in which Norwich were eliminated from the competition – against Inter Milan in the San Siro – through suspension after collecting two yellow cards in the tournament. He was a midfielder noted for his passing ability and accuracy from set-pieces. Many experts in the game believe that had Crook played for a so-called bigger club, he would have played for the full England team. In a 2001 poll for Four Four Two magazine, Crook was voted as one of the best players never to have played for England, along with his former Norwich team-mate Steve Bruce.

He was still with Norwich when they were relegated from the Premier League in 1995, ending the nine-year run of top division football which had started in the year that Crook joined them.

He famously agreed to leave Norwich to join their fierce rivals Ipswich Town at the end of the 1995–96 season, even posing for photos with his new shirt and buying his children replica kits before changing his mind and re-signing for City days later. This was due to former Norwich manager Mike Walker taking over the helm at Carrow Road following the sacking of Gary Megson and him persuading Crook to change his mind about the transfer. Crook had played under Walker for Norwich during his first spell as manager from 1992 to January 1994. Ipswich Town took it to court, with the local newspaper Evening Star carrying the headline "Get out of Town Crook and take that man Walker with you".

In 1997, he was signed by Eddie Thomson for Sanfrecce Hiroshima. He left the club in May 1998 and transferred to Northern Spirit FC, where he stayed until retiring as a player in 2000.

In 2002, Norwich fans voted Crook into the Norwich City F.C. Hall of Fame. In September of the same year he played at Carrow Road in the club's centenary match against Harwich & Parkeston F.C. Crook remained a favourite with Norwich City supporters, and in 2008 he was voted in the Greatest Ever Norwich City eleven.

== Managerial career ==
After leaving Japan, Crook played for and coached Northern Spirit FC in Australia before moving on to take his first managerial post at Newcastle Jets. In his first season in the 'Hunter region', he took the Jets from second bottom to second, earning him the NSL Coach of the year award. Following his successful time in Newcastle, Crook took on the job of coaching the American Samoa national football team, a team that had never scored a goal in a competitive international fixture. In early 2004 he was then appointed assistant coach for the Australian U20s team, before joining Sydney F.C. the following November, under manager Pierre Littbarski, winning the A-League title and attending the World Club Championships in 2005. After the 04–05 season Littbarski left the club following a contract dispute, and Crook remained at the club for another six months.

During his work in Australia, he was often linked with a possible return to Norwich, notably in the close-season of 2006, when Martin Hunter was eventually appointed as coach in place of Steve Foley. Following the departure of Peter Grant from Norwich City in October 2007, Crook was again linked with the vacant manager's position.

In January 2007 Crook accepted the assistant manager's role at Japanese second division side Avispa Fukuoka to be reunited with Littbarski, but the pair were dismissed in July 2008. He was subsequently linked with new A-League club North Queensland Fury FC, but instead was recruited for a second spell as manager at the Newcastle Jets. On 21 January 2009 Crook was unveiled as first team coach for Norwich City alongside new manager and former teammate Bryan Gunn. In June 2010 he returned to Australia, signing a two-year contract as Director of Coaching for Sydney Olympic Football Club. Ian left Sydney Olympic in 2010 to take up the position of Head Coach at the New South Wales Institute of Sport.

He returned to Sydney FC in 2011, the club he helped coach to their inaugural Championship, this time working with former player Steve Corica and under former Czech International Vitezslav Lavicka. Following the departure of Vitezslav Lavicka at the end of the 2011/2012 season, Crook was appointed manager of Sydney FC on 14 May 2012.

On only 11 November of the same year, Crook announced his immediate resignation as head coach of Sydney FC, following a 3–2 defeat to archrivals, Melbourne Victory. This was on the back of a humiliating 7–2 loss to the Central Coast Mariners the previous week. He was temporarily replaced by assistant coach Steve Corica in a caretaker role, and then permanently by Frank Farina on 28 November.

On 12 June 2014, Western Sydney Wanderers appointment Crook as assistant coach. Crook served as assistant during the club's successful 2014 AFC Champions League campaign. On 25 February 2015, Crook took the helm of the team due to Tony Popovic serving his first of a two-game suspension. The away match against Kashima Antlers of Japan ended 1–3 in favour to Wanderers.

== Personal life ==
Crook made a lasting impression at Norwich. Notably, he was elected to be a member of the club's Hall of Fame.

== Club statistics ==
Club performance			League		Cup		League Cup		Total	
Season	Club	League	Apps	Goals	Apps	Goals	Apps	Goals	Apps	Goals
Japan			League		Emperor's Cup		J.League Cup		Total	
1997	Sanfrecce Hiroshima	J1 League	15	3	0	0	0	0	15	3
1998	Sanfrecce Hiroshima	J1 League	9	1	0	0	0	0	9	1
Total			24	4	0	0	0	0	24	4

== Managerial statistics ==
As of 25 January 2013

Team	Nat	From	To	Record				
Team	Nat	From	To	G	W	D	L	Win %
Sydney FC	(Australia)	14 May 2012	28 November 2012	6	2	0	4	33.33
Total				6	2	0	4	33.33

Sporting positions
Preceded by Bryan Gunn	Norwich City Captain; 1996-1997	Succeeded by Matt Jackson
