= 1985–86 Norwich City F.C. season =

Norwich City
1985–86 season
- Chairman: Sir Arthur South (until 25 November); Robert Chase (from November)
- Manager: Ken Brown
- Stadium: Carrow Road
- Second Division: 1st
- FA Cup: Third round
- League Cup: Fourth round
- League Super Cup: Semi-final
- Player of the Year: Kevin Drinkell
- Top goalscorer: League: Kevin Drinkell (22); All: Kevin Drinkell (24)
- Highest home attendance: 20,129 v Portsmouth
- Lowest home attendance: 11,732 v Shrewsbury Town
- Average home league attendance: 14,528
- Biggest win: Norwich City 6–1 Millwall (21 December 1985)
- Biggest defeat: Millwall 4–2 Norwich City (24 August 1985)
Home colours	Away colours

For the 1985–86 season, Norwich City F.C. competed in Football League Division Two, following their relegation from Division One the previous season. They also completed in the FA Cup and Milk Cup as well as the first, and ultimately only, staging of the Screen Sport Super Cup.

== Overview ==
The previous season saw Norwich relegated back to the Second Division after three seasons in the top flight, a loss only slightly mitigated by them winning the Milk Cup. Norwich had a slow start to the season that saw them lose their first three away games, but things steadily improved and, after losing to Wimbledon in October, they would go unbeaten in the league for eighteen games, until they played Wimbledon again in March. In December, they first reached third place, and thus a promotion spot, with a 3–0 win over Blackburn Rovers, then overtook Portsmouth into first place with a 3–1 win over Oldham Athletic in the next game. They would remain top for the remainder of the season, achieving promotion in April with a 2–0 win at Bradford City and guaranteeing top spot with a 1–1 draw against Stoke City in the next game. They would finish a successful league campaign with a 4–0 win at home to Leeds United. They would remain in the top flight for the next nine seasons, still a club record.

Behind the scenes, in November, chairman Sir Arthur South received a challenge from board member Jimmy Jones, who proposed a vote of no confidence over building contracts being awarded to companies that South had an interest in. Instead, South and the board resigned, and a new board was installed headed by Robert Chase, with Jones as vice-chairman. Chase would remain in charge of the club until 1996.

Norwich had early exits from both main cup competitions, being knocked out of the FA Cup by Liverpool, who beat them 5–0 in the third round, while their defence of the Milk Cup ended in the fourth round with defeat to eventual winners Oxford United. Norwich had initially qualified for the UEFA Cup as Milk Cup winners but the Heysel stadium disaster led to English club first being withdrawn from European competition by the FA and then banned indefinitely. As compensation, Norwich and the other affected teams were invited to compete in the Screen Sport Super Cup. Norwich qualified from Group 1 with a win and defeat against Everton and two draws against Manchester United, before losing a two-legged semi-final to Liverpool. The second leg, played on 6 May, would be their last game of the season.

== Squad ==
Squad at the end of season (6 May 1986)

Note: Flags indicate national team as defined under FIFA eligibility rules; some limited exceptions apply. Players may hold more than one non-FIFA nationality.

Pos.	Nation	Player
GK	ENG	Chris Woods
GK	ENG	Graham Benstead
GK	ENG	Harvey Lim
DF	ENG	Ian Culverhouse
DF	NED	Dennis van Wijk
DF	ENG	Steve Bruce
DF	ENG	Dave Watson (captain)
DF	ENG	Paul Haylock
DF	ENG	Tony Spearing
DF	ENG	Kenny Brown
DF	ENG	Phil Chapple
MF	ENG	Mike Phelan

Pos.	Nation	Player
MF	ENG	Peter Mendham
MF	WAL	David Williams (vice-captain)
MF	ENG	Mark Barham
MF	ENG	Garry Brooke
MF	ENG	Dale Gordon
MF	ENG	Jeremy Goss
MF	ENG	Ruel Fox
FW	ENG	Kevin Drinkell
FW	ENG	Wayne Biggins
FW	ENG	John Deehan
FW	ENG	Robert Rosario
FW	ENG	Paul Clayton

== Transfers ==
=== In ===
Date	Pos	Name	From	Fee	Reference
24 May 1985	MF	Garry Brooke	Tottenham Hotspur	Unknown	
30 May 1985	MF	Mike Phelan	Burnley	Unknown	
30 May 1985	MF	David Williams	Bristol Rovers	Unknown	
14 June 1985	FW	Kevin Drinkell	Grimsby Town	Unknown	
7 October 1985	DF	Ian Culverhouse	Tottenham Hotspur	Unknown	
14 October 1985	FW	Wayne Biggins	Burnley	Unknown	

=== Out ===
Date	Pos	Name	To	Fee	Reference
16 July 1985	DF	Greg Downs	Coventry City	£40,000	
16 July 1985	FW	Gary Rowell	Middlesbrough	£25,000	
19 July 1985	FW	Mark Farrington	Cardiff City	Unknown	
25 July 1985	MF	Asa Hartford	Bolton Wanderers	Free	
13 August 1985	MF	Mike Channon	Portsmouth	Unknown	
15 August 1985	FW	David Fairclough	Oldham Athletic	Unknown	
25 November 1985	MF	John Devine	Stoke City	Unknown	
10 February 1986	MF	Louie Donowa	Real Deportivo de La Coruña	Unknown	
20 March 1986	FW	Jon Rigby	Aldershot	Unknown	

=== Loans out ===
Date	Pos	Name	To	Until	Reference
13 December 1985	FW	Robert Rosario	Wolverhampton Wanderers	End of season	
23 December 1985	MF	Louie Donowa	Stoke City	31 January 1985	

== Final table ==
Pos	Team	Pld	W	D	L	GF	GA	GD	Pts	Qualification or relegation
1	Norwich City (C, P)	42	25	9	8	84	37	+47	84	Promotion to the First Division
2	Charlton Athletic (P)	42	22	11	9	78	45	+33	77	Promotion to the First Division
3	Wimbledon (P)	42	21	13	8	58	37	+21	76	Promotion to the First Division
4	Portsmouth	42	22	7	13	69	41	+28	73	
5	Crystal Palace	42	19	9	14	57	52	+5	66	

Rules for classification: 1) Points; 2) Goal difference; 3) Goals scored
(C) Champions; (P) Promoted

== Results ==
=== Division Two ===
17 August 1985 1	Norwich City	1–0	Oldham Athletic	Norwich
	Mendham 26'			Stadium: Carrow Road; Attendance: 12,508; Referee: J. Bray

20 August 1985 2	Blackburn Rovers	2–1	Norwich City	Blackburn
	Fazackerley 63' (pen.); Garner 87'		Bruce 30'	Stadium: Ewood Park; Attendance: 6,567; Referee: M. Scott

24 August 1985 3	Millwall	4–2	Norwich City	London
	Kinsella 5'; Lovell 47' (pen.); Wilson 68'; Hinshelwood 76'		Brooke 22'; Deehan 90' (pen.)	Stadium: The Den; Attendance: 7,100; Referee: A. Robinson

26 August 1985 4	Norwich City	1–1	Barnsley	Norwich
	Bruce 90'		Owen 55'	Stadium: Carrow Road; Attendance: 13,510; Referee: E. Scales

31 August 1985 5	Portsmouth	2–0	Norwich City	Portsmouth
	Morgan 24' 82'			Stadium: Fratton Park; Attendance: 15,504; Referee: D. Reeves

7 September 1985 6	Norwich City	4–0	Sheffield United	Norwich
	Bruce 41'; Drinkell 61' 78'; Haylock 89'			Stadium: Carrow Road; Attendance: 12,899; Referee: R. Lewis

14 September 1985 7	Middlesbrough	1–1	Norwich City	Middlesbrough
	Drinkell 60'		Rowell 1' (pen.)	Stadium: Ayresome Park; Attendance: 5,475; Referee: J. McAuley

18 September 1985 8	Norwich City	4–3	Crystal Palace	Norwich
	Watson 24'; Drinkell 44'; Phelan 55'; Barham 78'		Gray 21' 26' (pen.); Droy 90'	Stadium: Carrow Road; Attendance: 13,475; Referee: J. Ball

21 September 1985 9	Huddersfield Town	0–0	Norwich City	Huddersfield
				Stadium: Leeds Road; Attendance: 7,225; Referee: J. Worrall

28 September 1985 10	Norwich City	2–0	Hull City	Norwich
	Rosario 9'; Mendham 61'		Skipper (red card) 78'	Stadium: Carrow Road; Attendance: 12,639; Referee: M. Cotton

5 October 1985 11	Norwich City	1–2	Wimbledon	Norwich
	Drinkell 5'		Martin 16' (pen.); Cork 19'	Stadium: Carrow Road; Attendance: 12,707; Referee: H. Taylor

12 October 1985 12	Carlisle United	0–4	Norwich City	Carlisle
			Rosario 20'; Phelan 54'; Drinkell 88'; Brooke 90'	Stadium: Brunton Park; Attendance: 2,907; Referee: G. Courtney

19 October 1985 13	Norwich City	3–1	Shrewsbury Town	Norwich
	Mendham 28'; Drinkell 35'; Barham 83'		van Wijk 27' (o.g.); Pearson (red card) 78'	Stadium: Carrow Road; Attendance: 11,732; Referee: N. Butler

26 October 1985 14	Sunderland	0–2	Norwich City	Sunderland
			Williams 61'; Mendham 87'	Stadium: Roker Park; Attendance: 17,908; Referee: R. Banks

2 November 1985 15	Brighton and Hove Albion	1–1	Norwich City	Hove
	Saunders 54'		Biggins 63'	Stadium: Goldstone Ground; Attendance: 10,423; Referee: D. Axcell

9 November 1985 16	Norwich City	0–0	Bradford City	Norwich
				Stadium: Carrow Road; Attendance: 13,939; Referee: K. Miller

16 November 1985 17	Stoke City	1–1	Norwich City	Stoke-on-Trent
	Bertschin 53' (pen.)		Drinkell 70'	Stadium: Victoria Ground; Attendance: 6,469; Referee: D. Ashby

23 November 1985 18	Norwich City	3–2	Grimsby Town	Norwich
	Watson 43'; Biggins 51'; Lyons 54' (o.g.)		Culverhouse 69' (o.g.); Emson 84'	Stadium: Carrow Road; Attendance: 12,108; Referee: C. Downey

30 November 1985 19	Leeds United	0–2	Norwich City	Leeds
			Drinkell 38'; Bruce 57'	Stadium: Elland Road; Attendance: 11,480; Referee: C. Thrushell

7 December 1985 20	Norwich City	3–0	Blackburn Rovers	Norwich
	Bruce 22'; Van Wijk 29'; Barham 54'			Stadium: Carrow Road; Attendance: 12,820; Referee: M. Dimblebee

14 December 1985 21	Oldham Athletic	1–3	Norwich City	Oldham
	Phelan 75' (o.g.)		Drinkell 51'; Barlow 69' (o.g.); Barham 84'	Stadium: Boundary Park; Attendance: 3,949; Referee: R. Nixon

21 December 1985 22	Norwich City	6–1	Millwall	Norwich
	Mendham 4'; Williams 9' 33'; Barham 20'; Drinkell 58'; Phelan 77'		Sheringham 83'	Stadium: Carrow Road; Attendance: 12,349; Referee: V. Callow

26 December 1985 23	Norwich City	3–1	Charlton Athletic	Norwich
	Drinkell 67' 84'; Deehan 88'		Flanagan 64'	Stadium: Carrow Road; Attendance: 17,984; Referee: J. Ball

1 January 1986 24	Fulham	0–1	Norwich City	London
			Drinkell 90'	Stadium: Craven Cottage; Attendance: 7,463; Referee: M. James

11 January 1986 25	Norwich City	2–0	Middlesbrough	Norwich
	Williams 44' (pen.); Bruce 84'			Stadium: Carrow Road; Attendance: 13,730; Referee: I. Hemley

18 January 1986 26	Norwich City	2–0	Portsmouth	Norwich
	Barham 77'; Drinkell 86'			Stadium: Carrow Road; Attendance: 20,129; Referee: N. Butler

25 January 1986 27	Crystal Palace	1–2	Norwich City	London
	Barber 46'		Mendham 13'; Biggins 38'	Stadium: Selhurst Park; Attendance: 8,369; Referee: R. Milford

1 February 1986 28	Barnsley	2–2	Norwich City	Barnsley
	Hirst 26'; Thomas 86'		Deehan 39'; Mendham 43'	Stadium: Oakwell; Attendance: 5,608; Referee: I. Hendrick

8 February 1986 29	Shrewsbury Town	0–3	Norwich City	Shrewsbury
			Drinkell 3' 64'; Barham 20'	Stadium: Gay Meadow; Attendance: 5,157; Referee: J. Worrall

8 March 1986 30	Wimbledon	2–1	Norwich City	London
	Evans 61'; Cork 64'		Barham 22'	Stadium: Plough Lane; Attendance: 5,827; Referee: G. Ashby

12 March 1986 31	Norwich City	4–1	Huddersfield Town	Norwich
	Drinkell 4'; Biggins 60' 85'; Bruce 72'		Curran 38'	Stadium: Carrow Road; Attendance: 12,772; Referee: D. Hedges

15 March 1986 32	Norwich City	2–1	Carlisle United	Norwich
	Williams 32' (pen.) 55'		McGarvey 66'	Stadium: Carrow Road; Attendance: 13,852; Referee: H. Taylor

22 March 1986 33	Sheffield United	2–5	Norwich City	Sheffield
	Edwards 34' 80'		Smith 6' (o.g.); Drinkell 41'; Mendham 65'; Barham 89'; Biggins 90'	Stadium: Bramall Lane; Attendance: 11,894; Referee: K. Redfern

29 March 1986 34	Norwich City	2–1	Fulham	Norwich
	Barham 22'; Deehan 40'		Coney 30'	Stadium: Carrow Road; Attendance: 17,320; Referee: T. Holbrook

31 March 1986 35	Charlton Athletic	1–0	Norwich City	London
	Pearson 49'			Stadium: Selhurst Park; Attendance: 8,458; Referee: D. Axcell

5 April 1986 36	Norwich City	3–0	Brighton and Hove Albion	Norwich
	Connor 50' (o.g.); Drinkell 71'; Williams 81' (pen.)			Stadium: Carrow Road; Attendance: 15,155; Referee: K. Baker

9 April 1986 37	Norwich City	0–0	Sunderland	Norwich
				Stadium: Carrow Road; Attendance: 17,752; Referee: B. Hill

12 April 1986 38	Bradford City	0–2	Norwich City	Bradford
			Drinkell 1'; Biggins 46'	Stadium: Odsal Stadium; Attendance: 7,190; Referee: T. Fitzharris

19 April 1986 39	Norwich City	1–1	Stoke City	Norwich
	Gordon 75'		Bertschin 65'	Stadium: Carrow Road; Attendance: 17,757; Referee: M. Scott

26 April 1986 40	Grimsby Town	1–0	Norwich City	Cleethorpes
	Hobson 54'			Stadium: Blundell Park; Attendance: 8,090; Referee: N. Midgley

29 April 1986 41	Hull City	1–0	Norwich City	Hull
	Williams 80'			Stadium: Boothferry Park; Attendance: 6,146; Referee: D. Allison

3 May 1986 42	Norwich City	4–0	Leeds United	Norwich
	Ormsby 33' (o.g.); Drinkell 59'; Bruce 66'; Williams 79'			Stadium: Carrow Road; Attendance: 17,942; Referee: K. Millar

=== FA Cup ===
4 January 1986 Third Round	Liverpool	5–0	Norwich City	Liverpool
	MacDonald 23'; Walsh 37'; McMahon 73'; Whelan 78'; Wark 81'			Stadium: Anfield; Attendance: 29,082; Referee: D. Hutchinson

=== Milk Cup ===
30 September 1985 Second Round, First Leg	Preston North End	1–1	Norwich City	Preston
	Brazil 20' (pen.)		Bruce 45'	Stadium: Deepdale; Attendance: 4,330; Referee: G. Tyson

9 October 1985 Second Round, Second Leg	Norwich City	2–1	Preston North End	Norwich
	Brooke 64'; Rosario 87'		Brazil 5'	Stadium: Carrow Road; Attendance: 11,537; Referee: G. Napthine

29 October 1985 Third Round	Luton Town	0–2	Norwich City	Luton
			Mendham 28'; Bruce 34'	Stadium: Kenilworth Road; Attendance: 8,202; Referee: B. Hill

20 November 1985 Fourth Round	Oxford United	3–1	Norwich City	Oxford
	Aldridge 20'; Thomas 51'; Phillips 63'		Drinkell 15'	Stadium: Manor Ground; Attendance: 7,851; Referee: A. Robinson

=== Screen Sport Super Cup ===
2 October 1985 Group 1	Everton	1–0	Norwich City	Liverpool
	Lineker 70'			Stadium: Goodison Park; Attendance: 10,329; Referee: J. Hough

23 October 1985 Group 1	Norwich City	1–0	Everton	Norwich
	Mendham 61'			Stadium: Carrow Road; Attendance: 12,196; Referee: T. Ward

6 November 1985 Group 1	Manchester United	1–1	Norwich City	Manchester
	Whiteside 54' (pen.)		Biggins 6'	Stadium: Old Trafford; Attendance: 20,130; Referee: T. Mills

11 December 1985 Group 1	Norwich City	1–1	Manchester United	Norwich
	Williams 9'		C. Gibson 71'	Stadium: Carrow Road; Attendance: 15,449; Referee: D. Vickers

5 February 1986 Semi-Final, First Leg	Norwich City	1–1	Liverpool	Norwich
	Drinkell 49'		Dalglish 79'	Stadium: Carrow Road; Attendance: 15,313; Referee: J. Moules

6 May 1986 Semi-Final, Second Leg	Liverpool	3–1	Norwich City	Liverpool
	MacDonald 56'; Molby 72' (pen.); Johnston 78'		Brooke 2'	Stadium: Anfield; Attendance: 26,696; Referee: A. Seville

== Appearances ==
Pos	Player	League			FA Cup			Milk Cup			Screen Sport Super Cup			Total		
Pos	Player	Starts	Sub	Goals	Starts	Sub	Goals	Starts	Sub	Goals	Starts	Sub	Goals	Starts	Subs	Goals
Goalkeepers
GK	Chris Woods	42	0	0	1	0	0	4	0	0	6	0	0	53	0	0
Defenders
RB	Ian Culverhouse	30	0	0	1	0	0	3	0	0	5	0	0	39	0	0
LB	Dennis van Wijk	27	2	1	1	0	0	4	0	0	5	0	0	35	2	1
CB	Steve Bruce	42	0	8	1	0	0	4	0	2	6	0	0	53	0	10
CB	Dave Watson	42	0	3	1	0	0	3	0	0	5	0	0	51	0	3
RB	Paul Haylock	12	0	1	–	–	–	1	0	0	1	1	0	14	1	1
LB	Tony Spearing	7	1	0	–	–	–	1	0	0	1	0	0	9	1	0
Midfielders
CM	Mike Phelan	42	0	3	1	0	0	4	0	0	6	0	0	53	0	3
AM	Peter Mendham	35	0	8	1	0	0	4	0	1	5	0	1	45	0	10
RW	Mark Barham	35	0	9	1	0	0	4	0	0	5	0	0	45	0	9
LW	David Williams	37	2	8	1	0	0	3	0	0	6	0	1	47	2	9
AM	Garry Brooke	8	5	2	–	–	–	1	1	1	1	2	1	10	8	4
AM	Dale Gordon	3	3	1	–	–	–	–	–	–	0	1	0	3	4	1
AM	Louie Donowa	0	2	0	–	–	–	–	–	–	–	–	–	0	2	0
Forwards
ST	Kevin Drinkell	41	0	22	1	0	0	4	0	1	6	0	1	43	0	24
ST	Wayne Biggins	28	0	7	1	0	0	–	–	–	4	0	1	33	0	8
ST	John Deehan	22	4	4	0	1	0	–	–	–	2	0	0	24	5	4
ST	Robert Rosario	8	0	2	–	–	–	4	0	1	1	0	0	13	0	3
ST	Paul Clayton	1	0	0	–	–	–	–	–	–	1	0	0	2	0	0

== Goalscorers ==
Rank	Position	Player	Division Two	FA Cup	Milk Cup	Screen Sport Super Cup	Total
1	ST	Kevin Drinkell	22	0	1	1	24
2	CB	Steve Bruce	8	0	2	0	10
2	CM	Peter Mendham	8	0	1	1	10
3	RW	Mark Barham	9	0	0	0	9
3	LW	David Williams	8	0	0	1	9
4	ST	Wayne Biggins	7	0	0	1	8
5	ST/LB	John Deehan	4	0	0	0	4
5	LW	Garry Brooke	2	0	1	1	4
6	CM	Mike Phelan	3	0	0	0	3
6	CB	Dave Watson	3	0	0	0	3
6	ST	Robert Rosario	2	0	1	0	3
7	RW	Dale Gordon	1	0	0	0	1
7	LB	Dennis van Wijk	1	0	0	0	1
7	RB	Paul Haylock	1	0	0	0	1
Own goals			5	0	0	0	5

== Bibliography ==
- Canary Citizens Centenary Edition: Authors Mike Davage, John Eastwood and Kevan Platt ISBN 0711720207
- The Football League Club Directory 1987: Editor Tony Williams ISBN 1-869833-01-5
- Norwich City: The Modern Era: Author Rob Hadgraft ISBN 978-1-905328-82-6
- News of the World Football Annual 1986-87: Editors Bill Bateson and Albert Sewell ISBN 0 85543 076 1
