= 1986–87 Norwich City F.C. season =

Norwich City
1986–87 season
- Chairman: Robert Chase
- Manager: Ken Brown
- Stadium: Carrow Road
- First Division: 5th
- FA Cup: Fourth round
- League Cup: Fourth round
- Full Members Cup: Semi-final
- Player of the Year: Kevin Drinkell
- Top goalscorer: League: Kevin Drinkell (16); All: Kevin Drinkell (21)
- Highest home attendance: 23,489 v Everton
- Lowest home attendance: 13,610 v Oxford United
- Average home league attendance: 17,913
- Biggest win: Aston Villa 1–4 Norwich City (20 September 1986)
- Biggest defeat: Liverpool 6–2 Norwich City (1 November 1986)
Home colours	Away colours

For the 1986–87 season, Norwich City F.C. competed in Football League Division One, following their promotion from Division Two the previous season. They also completed in the FA Cup and Littlewoods Cup and, for the first time, the Full Members Cup.

== Overview ==
The previous season had seen Norwich promoted back to the top flight as Second Division champions. Nevertheless, many expected them to struggle, especially since a number of players, including England internationals Chris Woods and Dave Watson, had departed the club just prior to the season. Instead, Norwich would be unbeaten in their first four games and, after experiencing their first defeat against Watford, would be unbeaten in the next six games, topping the table in October. Although they would subsequently suffer a 6–2 defeat to Liverpool, they would remain in the top half for the rest of the season, eventually securing fifth place and finishing the season with a 2–1 win over fourth-placed Arsenal. This was Norwich's highest league finish to that point by some distance, beating the tenth-place finish in 1975–76, and would remain so until they finished fourth in 1988–89. However, there would be no European qualification this season, since the ban on English clubs following the Heysel stadium disaster was still in effect.

In addition to the league, Norwich entered three cup competitions but made relatively early exits from both the FA Cup and the Littlewoods Cup. For the first time, they competed in the Full Members Cup, having instead entered the Football League Super Cup the previous season. Here, they reached the semi-finals, one game away from Wembley, only to be eliminated 2–1 by Charlton Athletic after extra-time.

== Squad ==
Squad at the end of season (9 May 1987)

Note: Flags indicate national team as defined under FIFA eligibility rules; some limited exceptions apply. Players may hold more than one non-FIFA nationality.

Pos.	Nation	Player
GK	SCO	Bryan Gunn
GK	ENG	Graham Benstead
GK	ENG	Harvey Lim
GK	ENG	Jon Sheffield
DF	ENG	Ian Culverhouse
DF	ENG	Tony Spearing
DF	ENG	Steve Bruce (captain)
DF	ENG	Ian Butterworth
DF	ENG	Shaun Elliott
DF	ENG	Kenny Brown
DF	ENG	Phil Chapple
DF	ENG	Andy Fensome
MF	ENG	Mike Phelan
MF	ENG	Dale Gordon

Pos.	Nation	Player
MF	ENG	Trevor Putney
MF	ENG	Ian Crook
MF	WAL	David Williams
MF	ENG	Mark Barham
MF	ENG	Peter Mendham
MF	ENG	Ruel Fox
MF	ENG	Jeremy Goss
MF	ENG	Garry Brooke
FW	ENG	Kevin Drinkell (vice-captain)
FW	ENG	Wayne Biggins
FW	ENG	Robert Rosario
FW	ENG	David Hodgson
FW	ENG	Paul Clayton

== Transfers ==
=== In ===
Date	Pos	Name	From	Fee	Reference
13 June 1986	MF	Trevor Putney	Ipswich Town	Exchange	
18 June 1986	MF	Ian Crook	Tottenham Hotspur	£80,000	
18 July 1986	FW	David Hodgson	Sunderland	Unknown	
22 August 1986	DF	Shaun Elliott	Sunderland	£150,000	
19 September 1986	DF	Ian Butterworth	Nottingham Forest	£160,000	
15 October 1986	GK	Bryan Gunn	Aberdeen	Unknown	

=== Out ===
Date	Pos	Name	To	Fee	Reference
28 May 1986	FW	John Deehan	Ipswich Town	Exchange	
1 July 1986	GK	Chris Woods	Rangers	£600,000	
18 August 1986	DF	Dennis van Wijk	Club Brugge	Unknown	
18 August 1986	DF	Paul Haylock	Gillingham	Free	
21 August 1986	DF	Dave Watson	Everton	£900,000	

=== Loans in ===
Date	Pos	Name	From	Until	Reference
21 November 1986	DF	Mark Seagraves	Liverpool	6 December 1986	

== Final table ==
Pos	Team	Pld	W	D	L	GF	GA	GD	Pts	Qualification or relegation
3	Tottenham Hotspur	42	21	8	13	68	43	+25	71	Disqualified from the UEFA Cup
4	Arsenal (Note: Arsenal would have qualified as League Cup winners.)	42	20	10	12	58	35	+23	70	Disqualified from the UEFA Cup
5	Norwich City	42	17	17	8	53	51	+2	68	
6	Wimbledon	42	19	9	14	57	50	+7	66	
7	Luton Town	42	18	12	12	47	45	+2	66	

Rules for classification: 1) Points; 2) Goal difference; 3) Goals scored

== Results ==
=== Division One ===
23 August 1986 1	Chelsea	0–0	Norwich City	London
				Stadium: Stamford Bridge; Attendance: 19,867; Referee: A. Gunn

30 August 1986 2	Norwich City	4–3	Southampton	Norwich
	Drinkell 47'; Gordon 49'; Williams 69'; Bruce 82'		Wallace 31'; Blake 41'; Dennis 80'	Stadium: Carrow Road; Attendance: 15,205; Referee: K. Barratt

3 September 1986 3	Manchester City	2–2	Norwich City	Manchester
	Christie 6' (pen.) 39'		Barham 10'; Elliott 78'	Stadium: Maine Road; Attendance: 19,122; Referee: L. Robinson

6 September 1986 4	Charlton Athletic	1–2	Norwich City	London
	Aizlewood 1'		Drinkell 6'; Williams 84'	Stadium: Selhurst Park; Attendance: 5,312; Referee: B. Hill

13 September 1986 5	Norwich City	1–3	Watford	Norwich
	Williams 18'		Richardson 55'; Sterling 60'; Blissett 88'	Stadium: Carrow Road; Attendance: 15,487; Referee: D. Reeves

17 September 1986 6	Norwich City	2–1	Leicester City	Norwich
	Barham 33'; Biggins 78'		Smith 22'	Stadium: Carrow Road; Attendance: 14,814; Referee: K. Hackett

20 September 1986 7	Aston Villa	1–4	Norwich City	Birmingham
	Stainrod 88'		Phelan 29'; Biggins 44'; Gordon 54'; Bruce 62'	Stadium: Villa Park; Attendance: 12,304; Referee: K. Hackett

27 September 1986 8	Norwich City	2–0	Newcastle United	Norwich
	Drinkell 4' 68'			Stadium: Carrow Road; Attendance: 15,735; Referee: C. Downey

4 October 1986 9	Norwich City	1–0	Queens Park Rangers	Norwich
	Gordon 78'			Stadium: Carrow Road; Attendance: 15,984; Referee: V. Callow

11 October 1986 10	Luton Town	0–0	Norwich City	Luton
				Stadium: Kenilworth Road; Attendance: 10,022; Referee: J. Ashworth

18 October 1986 11	Norwich City	1–1	West Ham United	Norwich
	Drinkell 58'		Goddard 76'	Stadium: Carrow Road; Attendance: 22,884; Referee: A. Seville

25 October 1986 12	Wimbledon	2–0	Norwich City	London
	Fashanu 13'; Gayle 38'			Stadium: Plough Lane; Attendance: 6,172; Referee: P. Vanes

1 November 1986 13	Liverpool	6–2	Norwich City	Liverpool
	Nicol 16'; Walsh 31' 58' 76'; Rush 49' 71'		Phelan 72'; Hodgson 84'	Stadium: Anfield; Attendance: 36,915; Referee: J. Bray

8 November 1986 14	Norwich City	2–1	Tottenham Hotspur	Norwich
	Crook 59'; Elliott 76'		Claesen 72'	Stadium: Carrow Road; Attendance: 22,139; Referee: K. Baker

15 November 1986 15	Norwich City	0–0	Manchester United	Norwich
				Stadium: Carrow Road; Attendance: 22,684; Referee: J. McAulay

22 November 1986 16	Coventry City	2–1	Norwich City	Coventry
	Phillips 7' 56'		Biggins 19'	Stadium: Highfield Road; Attendance: 11,029; Referee: D. Hutchinson

29 November 1986 17	Norwich City	2–1	Oxford United	Norwich
	Drinkell 13'; Gordon 22'		Aldridge 35'	Stadium: Carrow Road; Attendance: 13,610; Referee: D. Phillips

6 December 1986 18	Everton	4–0	Norwich City	Liverpool
	Power 18'; Steven 29' (pen.); Pointon 76'; Heath 81'			Stadium: Goodison Park; Attendance: 26,746; Referee: J. Lovatt

13 December 1986 19	Norwich City	1–1	Arsenal	Norwich
	Drinkell 79'		Hayes 55' (pen.)	Stadium: Carrow Road; Attendance: 21,409; Referee: T. Mills

19 December 1986 20	Watford	1–1	Norwich City	Watford
	Barnes 2'		Terry 23' (o.g.)	Stadium: Vicarage Road; Attendance: 12,900; Referee: J. Lloyd

26 December 1986 21	Norwich City	2–1	Nottingham Forest	Norwich
	Crook 75'; Rosario 79'		Pearce 64'	Stadium: Carrow Road; Attendance: 22,131; Referee: J. Ashworth

27 December 1986 22	Manchester United	0–1	Norwich City	Manchester
			Drinkell 80'	Stadium: Old Trafford; Attendance: 44,610; Referee: T. Simpson

1 January 1987 23	Sheffield Wednesday	1–1	Norwich City	Sheffield
	Shelton 81'		Drinkell 90'	Stadium: Hillsborough; Attendance: 20,956; Referee: J. Worrall

3 January 1987 24	Norwich City	1–1	Charlton Athletic	Norwich
	Biggins 74'		Stuart 22'	Stadium: Carrow Road; Attendance: 16,827; Referee: D. Axcell

24 January 1987 25	Norwich City	2–2	Chelsea	Norwich
	Rosario 30'; Drinkell 62'		Bumstead 2'; Wicks 46'	Stadium: Carrow Road; Attendance: 16,562; Referee: J. Moules

7 February 1987 26	Southampton	1–2	Norwich City	Southampton
	Cockerill 69'		Phelan 55'; Drinkell 79'	Stadium: The Dell; Attendance: 12,754; Referee: K. Cooper

14 February 1987 27	Norwich City	1–1	Manchester City	Norwich
	Crook 44'		Brightwell 42'	Stadium: Carrow Road; Attendance: 16,094; Referee: R. Lewis

21 February 1987 28	Leicester City	0–2	Norwich City	Leicester
			Crook 1'; Putney 61'	Stadium: Filbert Street; Attendance: 8,742; Referee: J. Ireland

28 February 1987 29	Norwich City	1–1	Aston Villa	Norwich
	Phelan 72'		Elliott 34'	Stadium: Carrow Road; Attendance: 15,070; Referee: D. Hedges

7 March 1987 30	Norwich City	0–0	Wimbledon	Norwich
				Stadium: Carrow Road; Attendance: 14,293; Referee: K. Hackett

14 March 1987 31	West Ham United	0–2	Norwich City	London
			Bruce 2'; Drinkell 90'	Stadium: Upton Park; Attendance: 21,531; Referee: M. Bailey

21 March 1987 32	Norwich City	0–0	Luton Town	Norwich
			Grimes (red card)	Stadium: Carrow Road; Attendance: 16,440; Referee: M. James

28 March 1987 33	Queens Park Rangers	1–1	Norwich City	London
	Rosenior 40'		Drinkell 20'	Stadium: Loftus Road; Attendance: 9,834; Referee: L. Shapter

4 April 1987 34	Tottenham Hotspur	3–0	Norwich City	London
	Allen 75' 81' 87'			Stadium: White Hart Lane; Attendance: 22,400; Referee: V. Callow

8 April 1987 35	Newcastle United	4–1	Norwich City	Newcastle
	Goddard 40'; Gascoigne 62'; McDonald 71' (pen.); D. Jackson 90'		Drinkell 17'	Stadium: St James' Park; Attendance: 24,534; Referee: D. Allison

11 April 1987 36	Norwich City	2–1	Liverpool	Norwich
	Putney 70'; Drinkell 88'		Rush 37'	Stadium: Carrow Road; Attendance: 22,879; Referee: C. Downey

18 April 1987 37	Norwich City	1–0	Sheffield Wednesday	Norwich
	Putney 2'; Crook (red card) 72'		Snodin (red card) 72'	Stadium: Carrow Road; Attendance: 17,024; Referee: A. Buksh

20 April 1987 38	Nottingham Forest	1–1	Norwich City	Nottingham
	Clough 78'		Rosario 62'	Stadium: City Ground; Attendance: 14,446; Referee: N. Butler

25 April 1987 39	Norwich City	1–1	Coventry City	Norwich
	Drinkell 26'		Butterworth 81' (o.g.)	Stadium: Carrow Road; Attendance: 14,610; Referee: T. Ward

2 May 1987 40	Oxford United	0–1	Norwich City	Oxford
			Gordon 2'	Stadium: Manor Ground; Attendance: 8,394; Referee: K. Baker

4 May 1987 41	Norwich City	0–1	Everton	Norwich
			Van Den Hauwe 1'	Stadium: Carrow Road; Attendance: 23,489; Referee: J. Bray

9 May 1987 42	Arsenal	1–2	Norwich City	London
	Merson 61'		Crook 8'; Putney 72'	Stadium: Highbury; Attendance: 24,001; Referee: R. Milford

=== FA Cup ===
10 January 1987 Third Round	Norwich City	1–1	Huddersfield Town	Norwich
	Drinkell 87'		Shearer 73'	Stadium: Carrow Road; Attendance: 11,524; Referee: A. Seville

21 January 1987 Third Round Replay	Huddersfield Town	2–4	Norwich City	Huddersfield
	Brown (pen.), 13'; Cork 78'		Phelan 30'; Rosario 45'; Drinkell 47'; Gordon 50'; Biggins (red card)	Stadium: Leeds Road; Attendance: 8,970; Referee: A. Seville

31 January 1987 Fourth Round	Wigan Athletic	1–0	Norwich City	Wigan
	Jewell 78'			Stadium: Springfield Park; Attendance: 8,095; Referee: M. Reed

=== Littlewoods Cup ===
24 September 1986 Second Round, First Leg	Peterborough United	0–0	Norwich City	Peterborough
				Stadium: London Road; Attendance: 6,956; Referee: G. Napthine

8 October 1986 Second Round, Second Leg	Norwich City	1–0	Peterborough United	Norwich
	Biggins 48'			Stadium: Carrow Road; Attendance: 10,027; Referee: M. Scott

29 October 1986 Third Round	Norwich City	4–1	Millwall	Norwich
	Hodgson 2' 77' 90'; Drinkell 11' (pen.)		Byrne 14'	Stadium: Carrow Road; Attendance: 10,277; Referee: J. Key

19 November 1986 Fourth Round	Norwich City	1–4	Everton	Norwich
	Barham 30'		Sheedy 21'; Sharp 35'; Steven 78' (pen.); Heath 84'	Stadium: Carrow Road; Attendance: 17,988; Referee: C. Downey

=== Full Members' Cup ===
4 November 1986 Second Round	Norwich City	2–1	Coventry City	Norwich
	Drinkell 24' 88'		Phillips	Stadium: Carrow Road; Attendance: 6,235; Referee: M. James

9 December 1986 Third Round	Southampton	1–2 (a.e.t.)	Norwich City	Southampton
	Case 86' (pen.)		Drinkell 48'; Rosario 92'	Stadium: The Dell; Attendance: 5,745; Referee: M. Bodenham

25 February 1987 Quarter-final	Norwich City	3–1	Portsmouth	Norwich
	Rosario 33'; Gordon 77'; Biggins 89'		O'Callaghan 62'	Stadium: Carrow Road; Attendance: 9,204; Referee: J. Moules

10 March 1987 Semi-final	Charlton Athletic	2–1 (a.e.t.)	Norwich City	London
	Walsh 90'; Butterworth 93' (o.g.)		Rosario 89'	Stadium: Selhurst Park; Attendance: 5,431; Referee: M. Bodenham

== Appearances ==
Pos	Player	League			FA Cup			Littlewoods Cup			Full Members Cup			Total		
Pos	Player	Starts	Sub	Goals	Starts	Sub	Goals	Starts	Sub	Goals	Starts	Sub	Goals	Starts	Subs	Goals
Goalkeepers
GK	Bryan Gunn	29	0	0	3	0	0	1	0	0	4	0	0	37	0	0
GK	Graham Benstead	13	0	0	–	–	–	3	0	0	–	–	–	16	0	0
Defenders
RB	Ian Culverhouse	25	0	0	3	0	0	4	0	0	2	0	0	34	0	0
LB	Tony Spearing	39	0	0	3	0	0	4	0	0	3	0	0	49	0	0
CB	Steve Bruce	41	0	3	3	0	0	4	0	0	4	0	0	52	0	3
CB	Ian Butterworth	28	0	0	3	0	0	–	–	–	3	0	0	34	0	0
RB	Kenny Brown	17	1	0	–	–	–	–	–	–	3	0	0	20	1	0
CB	Shaun Elliott	15	0	2	–	–	–	2	0	0	1	1	0	18	1	2
LB	Mark Seagraves	3	0	0	–	–	–	–	–	–	–	–	–	3	0	0
Midfielders
CM	Mike Phelan	40	0	4	3	0	1	4	0	0	3	0	0	50	0	5
CM	Ian Crook	31	2	5	3	0	0	2	1	0	4	0	0	40	3	5
AM	Trevor Putney	20	3	4	–	–	–	1	0	0	3	0	0	24	3	4
AM	Dale Gordon	40	1	5	3	0	1	4	0	0	3	0	1	50	1	7
CM	David Williams	12	0	3	–	–	–	2	0	0	–	–	–	14	0	3
AM	Mark Barham	11	2	2	–	–	–	3	1	1	–	–	–	14	3	3
AM	Peter Mendham	3	0	0	–	–	–	1	1	0	–	–	–	4	1	0
AM	Ruel Fox	1	2	0	–	–	–	–	–	–	1	0	0	2	2	0
CM	Jeremy Goss	1	0	0	–	–	–	–	–	–	1	0	0	2	0	0
AM	Garry Brooke	0	1	0	–	–	–	–	–	–	0	1	0	0	2	0
Forwards
ST	Kevin Drinkell	42	0	16	3	0	2	4	0	1	4	0	2	53	0	21
ST	Wayne Biggins	23	8	4	3	0	0	3	0	1	1	2	2	30	10	7
ST	Robert Rosario	25	0	3	2	0	1	1	0	0	3	0	3	31	0	7
ST	David Hodgson	3	3	1	1	0	0	1	0	3	1	0	0	6	3	4

== Goalscorers ==
Rank	Position	Player	Division One	FA Cup	Littlewoods Cup	Full Members Cup	Total
1	ST	Kevin Drinkell	16	2	1	2	21
2	LW	Dale Gordon	5	1	0	1	7
2	ST	Wayne Biggins	4	0	1	2	7
2	ST	Robert Rosario	3	1	0	3	7
3	CM	Ian Crook	5	0	0	0	5
3	CM	Mike Phelan	4	1	0	0	5
4	RW	Trevor Putney	4	0	0	0	4
4	ST	David Hodgson	1	0	3	0	4
5	RW	David Williams	3	0	0	0	3
5	CB	Steve Bruce	3	0	0	0	3
5	CM	Mark Barham	2	0	1	0	3
6	CB	Shaun Elliott	2	0	0	0	2
Own goals			1	0	0	0	1

== Bibliography ==
- Canary Citizens Centenary Edition: Authors Mike Davage, John Eastwood and Kevan Platt ISBN 0711720207
- The Football League Club Directory 1988: Editor Tony Williams ISBN 1-869833-05-8
- Norwich City: The Modern Era: Author Rob Hadgraft ISBN 978-1-905328-82-6
- News of the World Football Annual 1987-88: Editors Bill Bateson and Albert Sewell ISBN 0 85543 100 8
