= John Rigby =

John Rigby may refer to:

- John Rigby (martyr) (c. 1570–1600), English Catholic and martyr
- John Rigby (gunmaker) (1892–1916), descendant of the founder of John Rigby & Co.
- Sir John Rigby (politician) (1834–1903), British lawyer and politician
- John Rigby (artist) (1922–2012), Australian artist, known for his bush landscapes
- John Rigby (rower) (1906–1975), New Zealand rower
- John E. Rigby (1923–1972), Canadian politician
- John Rigby (mathematician) (1933–2014), English mathematician
- John Rigby (alpine skier) (born 1942), British former alpine skier
- John Rigby (swimmer) (born 1942), Australian Olympic swimmer

== See also ==
- Jon Rigby (born 1965), footballer
- John Rigby & Company gun and rifle makers of Dublin and London
