= Haylock =

Haylock is a surname. Notable people with the surname include:

- Garry Haylock (born 1970), English footballer and manager
- Paul Haylock (born 1963), English footballer
- Roy Haylock (born 1975), American drag queen also known as Bianca Del Rio
