= Garry Brooke =

English footballer (1960–2025)

Personal information
- Full name: Garry James Brooke
- Date of birth: 24 November 1960
- Place of birth: Bethnal Green, England
- Date of death: 18 January 2025 (aged 64)
- Height: 5 ft 6 in (1.68 m)
- Position: Midfielder

Senior career*
Years	Team	Apps	(Gls)
1978–1985	Tottenham Hotspur	73	(15)
1979–1980	→ GAIS (loan)	23	(8)
1985–1987	Norwich City	14	(2)
1987–1988	Groningen	39	(9)
1988–1990	Wimbledon	12	(0)
1990	→ Stoke City (loan)	8	(0)
1990	Brentford	11	(1)
1990–1991	Baldock Town		
1991	Colchester United	0	(0)
1991	Reading	4	(0)
1991	Wivenhoe Town	9	(4)
1991–1992	St Albans City	5	(0)
1992	Romford	1	(0)
- Worthing
- Cornard United
- Braintree Town
Total		188	(38)
- * Club domestic league appearances and goals

Garry James Brooke (24 November 1960 – 18 January 2025) was an English professional footballer who played as a midfielder for Tottenham Hotspur, Norwich City, FC Groningen, Wimbledon, Stoke City and Brentford before moving into non-league football.

== Career ==
Brooke began his career with Tottenham Hotspur. He spent a year on loan at Swedish side GAIS, scoring eight goals in 23 appearances and made his Spurs debut in a 3–2 defeat against West Bromwich Albion. His full debut came in a 4–4 draw with Southampton, with Brooke scoring twice. His debut season ended with a substitute appearance in the 1981 FA Cup Final, which saw Tottenham beat Manchester City in a replay. His second season with Spurs saw the team again lift the FA Cup in a replay but Brooke's place in the side came under threat from Glenn Hoddle and Tony Galvin. He played 33 times in the 1982–83 season, scoring nine goals, but his run in the side was cut short due to a near-fatal car crash in February 1983. It took him seven months to regain fitness and he struggled to get back into the side due to his injuries causing him to be easily short of breath. He played in just seven matches in 1984–85 and was sold to Norwich City.

He never settled at Norwich as he missed London and also did not get on with first-team coach Mel Machin. He helped Norwich win the Second Division title in 1985–86 but missed out on a medal as he played 13 matches, one short of the required 14. After failing to get into the Norwich side in 1986–87, he decided to move to Dutch team Groningen. Brooke enjoyed his time at Groningen as he was given a free role by the manager Henk van Brussel. He returned to England in August 1988 following the birth of his daughter and decided to sign for Wimbledon. He regretted moving to Wimbledon as he did not fit in with their direct style of play and moved on loan to Stoke City in March 1990 for the remainder of the 1989–90 season. He played eight matches for Stoke, which saw the team draw and lose four matches and end the season being relegated. He later had short spells with Brentford and Reading, also playing in non-League for Baldock Town, Colchester United, Wivenhoe Town, St Albans City, Romford, Worthing, Cornard United and Braintree Town.

== Personal life and death ==
Brooke was born in Bethnal Green on 24 November 1960. He died on the morning of 18 January 2025, at the age of 64 "following a lengthy battle with illness".

== Career statistics ==
Appearances and goals by club, season and competition
Club	Season	League			National cup		League cup		Other (Note: Includes Football League Trophy, Full Members Cup, Screen Sport Super Cup, UEFA Cup, UEFA Cup Winners' Cup, FA Trophy, Conference League Cup, Isthmian League Cup, Herts Charity Cup and East Anglian Cup.)		Total	
Club	Season	Division	Apps	Goals	Apps	Goals	Apps	Goals	Apps	Goals	Apps	Goals
Tottenham Hotspur	1978–79	First Division	0	0	0	0	0	0	—		0	0
Tottenham Hotspur	1979–80	First Division	0	0	0	0	0	0	—		0	0
Tottenham Hotspur	1980–81	First Division	18	3	7	1	0	0	—		25	4
Tottenham Hotspur	1981–82	First Division	16	4	2	0	0	0	—		18	4
Tottenham Hotspur	1982–83	First Division	23	7	2	0	4	1	4	1	33	9
Tottenham Hotspur	1983–84	First Division	12	0	1	0	1	0	4	0	18	0
Tottenham Hotspur	1984–85	First Division	4	1	0	0	0	0	3	0	7	1
Tottenham Hotspur	Total		73	15	12	1	5	1	11	1	101	18
GAIS (loan)	1980	Swedish Division 2	23	8	—		—		—		23	8
Norwich City	1985–86	Second Division	13	2	0	0	2	1	3	1	18	4
Norwich City	1986–87	First Division	1	0	0	0	0	0	1	0	2	0
Norwich City	Total		14	2	0	0	2	1	4	1	20	4
Groningen	1986–87	Eredivisie	11	1	0	0	—		—		11	1
Groningen	1987–88	Eredivisie	28	8	0	0	—		—		28	8
Groningen	Total		39	9	0	0	—		—		39	9
Wimbledon	1988–89	First Division	10	0	0	0	2	0	—		12	0
Wimbledon	1989–90	First Division	2	0	0	0	0	0	—		2	0
Wimbledon	Total		12	0	0	0	2	0	—		14	0
Stoke City (loan)	1989–90	Second Division	8	0	0	0	0	0	0	0	8	0
Brentford	1990–91	Third Division	11	1	1	0	2	0	0	0	14	1
Colchester United	1990–91	Conference	0	0	—		—		1	0	1	0
Reading	1990–91	Third Division	4	0	—		—		—		4	0
St Albans City	1991–92	Isthmian League Premier Division	4	0	0	0	—		3	0	7	0
St Albans City	1992–93	Isthmian League Premier Division	1	0	1	0	—		2	0	4	0
St Albans City	Total		5	0	1	0	—		5	0	11	0
Career total			189	35	14	1	11	2	21	2	235	40

== Honours ==
Tottenham Hotspur

- FA Cup: 1980–81, 1981–82
- UEFA Cup: 1983–84
