= Steve Bruce =

English football player and manager (born 1960)

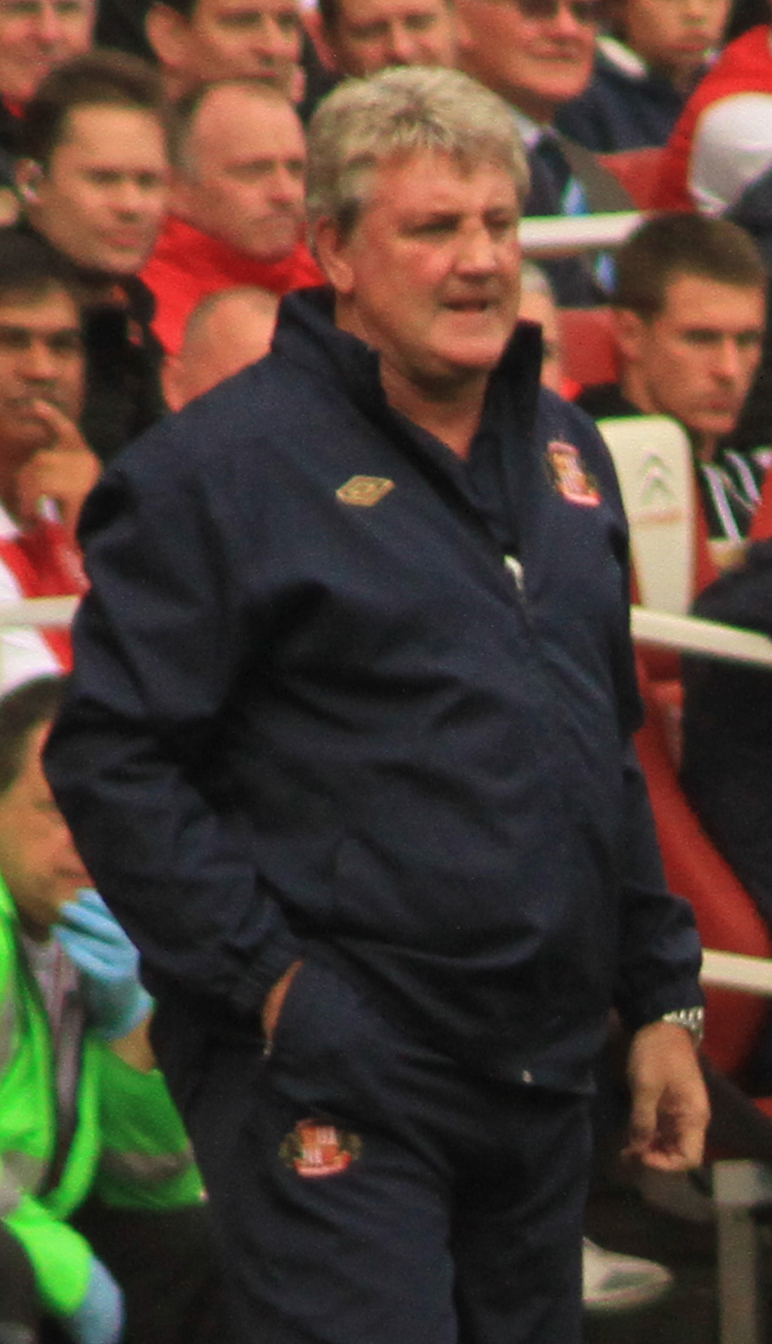
- Bruce in 2011

Personal information
- Full name: Stephen Roger Bruce
- Date of birth: 31 December 1960 (age 65)
- Place of birth: Corbridge, England
- Height: 6 ft 0 in (1.83 m)
- Position: Centre-back

Youth career
- 1977–1979: Gillingham

Senior career*
| Years | Team | Apps | (Gls) |
| 1979–1984 | Gillingham | 205 | (29) |
| 1984–1987 | Norwich City | 141 | (14) |
| 1987–1996 | Manchester United | 309 | (36) |
| 1996–1998 | Birmingham City | 72 | (2) |
| 1998–1999 | Sheffield United | 10 | (0) |
| Total | | 737 | (81) |

International career
| 1979–1980 | England Youth | 8 | (1) |
| 1987 | England B | 1 | (0) |

Managerial career
- 1998–1999: Sheffield United
- 1999–2000: Huddersfield Town
- 2001: Wigan Athletic
- 2001: Crystal Palace
- 2001–2007: Birmingham City
- 2007–2009: Wigan Athletic
- 2009–2011: Sunderland
- 2012–2016: Hull City
- 2016–2018: Aston Villa
- 2019: Sheffield Wednesday
- 2019–2021: Newcastle United
- 2022: West Bromwich Albion
- 2024–2025: Blackpool
- * Club domestic league appearances and goals

Stephen Roger Bruce (born 31 December 1960) is an English former professional football manager and former player who was a centre-back in a twenty-year playing career.

Born in Corbridge, Northumberland, Bruce was a promising schoolboy footballer but was rejected by several professional clubs. He was on the verge of quitting the game altogether when he was offered a trial with Gillingham. He was offered an apprenticeship and went on to play more than 200 games for the club before joining Norwich City in 1984, winning the League Cup in 1985. In 1987, he moved to Manchester United, with whom he achieved great success, winning twelve trophies including three Premier League titles, three FA Cups, one League Cup and the European Cup Winners' Cup. He also became the first English player of the 20th century to captain a team to the Double. Despite his success on the field, he was never selected to play for the England national team. Commentators and contemporaries have described him as one of the best English players of the 1980s and 1990s never to play for his country at full international level.

Bruce began his managerial career with Sheffield United, and spent short periods of time managing Huddersfield Town, Wigan Athletic and Crystal Palace before joining Birmingham City in 2001. He twice led Birmingham to promotion to the Premier League during his tenure of nearly six years, but resigned in 2007 to begin a second spell as manager of Wigan. At the end of the 2008–09 season, he resigned to take over as manager of Sunderland, a post he held until he was dismissed in November 2011. Seven months later, he was appointed manager of Hull City and led the club to two promotions to the Premier League, as well as the 2014 FA Cup Final, before leaving in July 2016. He took over at Aston Villa four months later but was dismissed in October 2018. He became manager of Sheffield Wednesday in February 2019, and left in July that year to take over at Newcastle United. He managed the club through the COVID-19 pandemic, keeping them in the Premier League, and left in November 2021 following the club's takeover by the Public Investment Fund. His final match in charge was his 1,000th in club management. In February 2022, Bruce took over as manager of West Bromwich Albion but was dismissed in October of the same year due to a poor start to the 2022–23 season. He was appointed head coach of Blackpool in September 2024 but was later sacked in October 2025.

== Early life ==
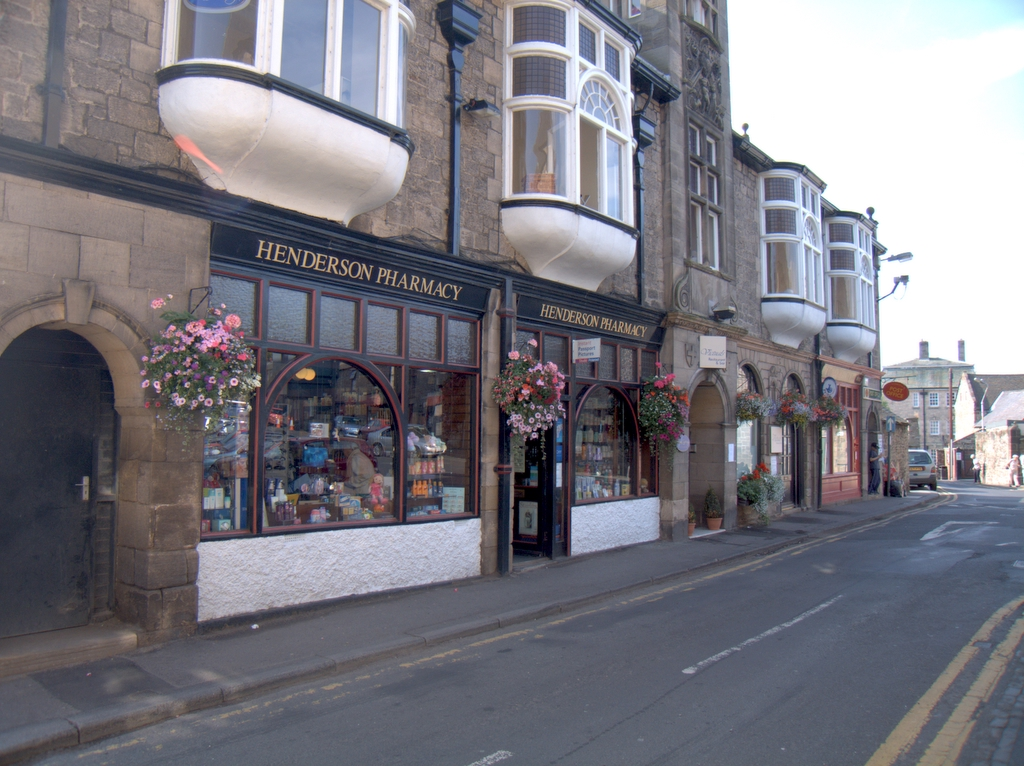
Corbridge, Bruce's place of birth

Bruce was born in Corbridge in Northumberland, the elder of two sons of Joe and Sheenagh Bruce. His father was local; his mother was a native of Bangor, Northern Ireland. The family lived in Daisy Hill, near Wallsend, and Bruce attended Benfield School.

Bruce, a boyhood fan of Newcastle United, said that he sneaked into St James' Park without paying to watch the team play, saying "I have always been a Newcastle lad and when I was a kid, I crawled under the turnstiles to get in to try and save a bob or whatever it was. They were my team, I went to support them as a boy and being a Geordie it's in-bred, you follow the club still the same today." Like several other future professionals from the area, he played football for Wallsend Boys Club. He was also selected for the Newcastle Schools representative team, and at the age of 13 was among a group of players from that team who were selected to serve as ball boys at the 1974 League Cup Final at Wembley Stadium.

Having been turned down by several professional clubs, including Newcastle United, Sunderland, Derby County and Southport, Bruce was about to start work as an apprentice plumber at the Swan Hunter dockyard when he was offered a trial by Third Division club Gillingham, whose manager Gerry Summers had seen him playing for Wallsend in an international youth tournament. He travelled down to Kent with Peter Beardsley, another player from the Wallsend club, but although Gillingham signed Bruce as an apprentice, they turned Beardsley away. At the time, Bruce was playing as a midfielder, but he was switched to the centre of defence by the head of Gillingham's youth scheme, Bill Collins, whom Bruce cites as the single biggest influence on his career.

== Playing career ==
=== Gillingham ===
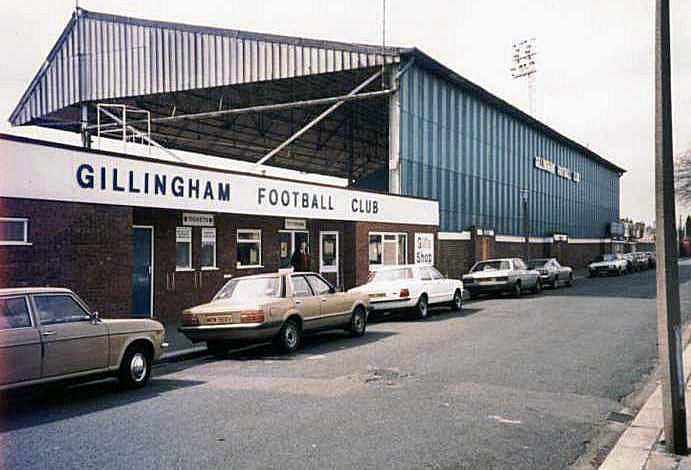
Priestfield Stadium, home of Gillingham F.C., where Bruce began his playing career

Bruce spent the 1978–79 season in Gillingham's reserve team and, despite playing in defence, scored 18 goals to finish the season as top scorer. In January 1979, he was selected to represent the England youth team, and he went on to gain eight caps, participating in the 1980 UEFA European Under-18 Championship. He came close to making his debut for the club's senior team in May 1979, but Summers decided at the last minute that, as Gillingham were chasing promotion from the Third Division, Bruce was not yet ready to handle the pressure of the occasion. He eventually made his senior debut in a League Cup tie against Luton Town on 11 August 1979, and made an immediate impact in the team, winning the club's Player of the Year award at the end of the 1979–80 season. He went on to make more than 200 appearances for the club, and was twice voted into the Professional Footballers' Association's Third Division Team of the Year.

Confident that he was being targeted by clubs from higher divisions, Bruce resolved not to sign a new contract with Gillingham when his existing deal expired at the end of the 1983–84 season. In an April 1983 match against Newport County, he attempted, in a moment of anger, to deliberately injure opposition player Tommy Tynan, but connected awkwardly and succeeded only in breaking his own leg, leaving him unable to play again for six months. He returned in time to play a key role in Gillingham achieving two draws against Everton in the FA Cup in 1984, attracting the attention once again of scouts from First Division clubs. Arthur Cox, manager of Bruce's beloved Newcastle United, expressed an interest in signing the player, but resigned from his job before any further action could be taken. Bruce eventually opted to sign for Norwich City in August 1984 for a fee variously reported as £125,000 or £135,000. In 2009, he was voted into Gillingham's Hall of Fame.

=== Norwich City ===
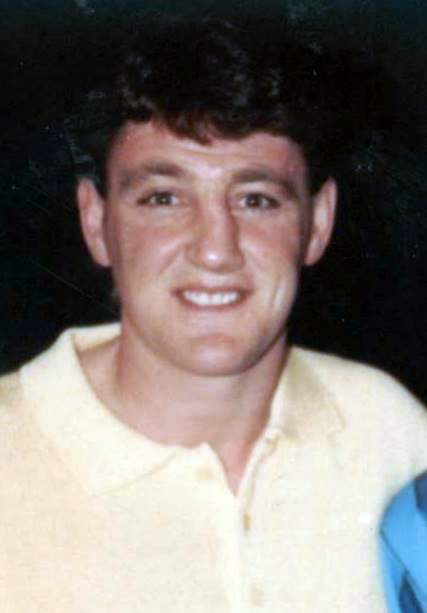
Bruce pictured circa 1986, during his time with Norwich City

Bruce began the 1984–85 season by scoring an own goal in the first minute of his debut for Norwich against Liverpool, but went on to score the team's winning goal in the semi-final of the League Cup against local rivals Ipswich Town, and was named man of the match in Norwich's victory in the final. Bruce was voted Norwich City Player of the Season, but the team was relegated to the Second Division. Bruce played in every match as Norwich won promotion back to the top division at the first time of asking in the 1985–86 season, after which he was chosen to replace the departing Dave Watson as club captain. The following season he helped the club to its highest league finish to date of fifth position.

In 1987, he was chosen to captain the England B team in a match against the full national team of Malta, but it was to be his only appearance in an England shirt, and he has subsequently been described as one of the best defenders of his era never to be selected for the full England team. Bruce later stated, "I bumped into former England manager Bobby Robson in Benfica (sic). He came up to me and said 'I should have capped you'. It was nice to hear but it still didn't get me one .... I'll always be a little disappointed I didn't get one."

Bruce began to attract the attention of big-name clubs in late 1987, with Manchester United, Tottenham Hotspur, Chelsea and Rangers all reported to be interested in signing him. Manchester United quickly emerged as the front runners for his signature, and Bruce publicly expressed his desire to sign for the club. The deal came close to collapsing when Norwich asked for a transfer fee of £900,000 after initially agreeing to accept £800,000, leading to Bruce refusing to play any further matches for the club, which he felt was jeopardising his dream move. On 17 December 1987, shortly before his 27th birthday, the deal was concluded and Bruce officially left Carrow Road, for a fee reported as £800,000 or £825,000. Norwich fans remembered his contribution, and in 2002 voted him into the Norwich City Hall of Fame.

=== Manchester United ===
Bruce made his Manchester United debut in a 2–1 win over Portsmouth on 19 December 1987, and played in 21 of United's remaining 22 league fixtures, helping the club to a top-two place in the First Division for the first time since 1980. The team only finished in mid-table in the following season, prompting manager Alex Ferguson to bring in several new players, including Gary Pallister, who joined the club in August 1989 from Middlesbrough. His partnership with Bruce in the centre of defence was described in 2006 by the then-United captain, Gary Neville, as the best in the club's history. "Dolly and Daisy", as the pair were affectionately known, are described as "arguably the best" on the official Manchester United website. Bruce and Pallister were part of the team that won the 1990 FA Cup Final against Crystal Palace in a replay.

Following the lifting of the five-year ban on English clubs from European competitions, which had been imposed after the Heysel Stadium disaster, United became England's first entrants into the European Cup Winners' Cup in the 1990–91 season. Bruce played regularly, and scored three goals, in the team's progress to the final against FC Barcelona. He came close to scoring the first goal, only for Mark Hughes to deflect the ball over the line and claim the goal, and United went on to win the game 2–1. This was a particularly high-scoring season for Bruce, who found the net 13 times in the First Division and 19 times in total in all competitions. He also played again at Wembley, in the League Cup final, in which United were defeated by Sheffield Wednesday of the Second Division.

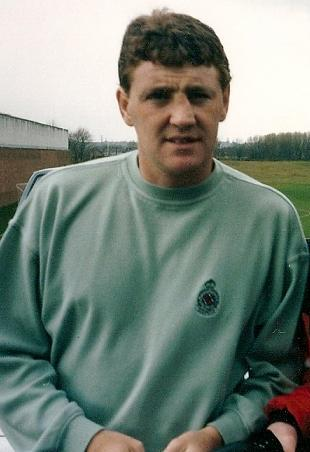
Bruce pictured in 1992, during his time at Manchester United

Bruce missed several weeks of the 1991–92 season when he underwent an operation on a longstanding hernia problem, in which Leeds United, after a season-long tussle, beat Manchester United to the championship by four points. Bruce helped United win their first-ever League Cup in April 1992, captaining the team in the final in place of the injured Bryan Robson. Injuries continued to take their toll upon Robson during the 1992–93 season, leading to Bruce captaining the team in the majority of United's matches during the first season of the new Premier League. Bruce scored two late goals in a win over Sheffield Wednesday which proved decisive in United winning the inaugural Premier League title, the first time the club had won the championship of English football since 1967, and he and Robson received the trophy jointly after the home victory over Blackburn Rovers on 3 May.

At the height of his success with United, Bruce was contacted by Jack Charlton, manager of the Republic of Ireland national team, who had discovered that, due to his mother's place of birth, Bruce was eligible to play for Ireland. Bruce states in his autobiography that further investigation revealed that, while his earlier appearance for England B in a friendly was not an issue, his appearances for the England Youth team in a UEFA-sanctioned tournament prohibited him from playing for the senior team of another country. He has subsequently claimed that he chose not to play for Ireland as it would have caused problems for his club at a time when UEFA restricted the number of foreign players that a club could have in their squad in its competitions.

United dominated English football in the 1993–94 season, winning a second consecutive Premier League title and then defeating Chelsea in the FA Cup final to become only the fourth team, and Bruce the first English captain, to win the Double in the 20th century, The 1994–95 season was a disappointing one for Bruce and United, as the club failed in its bid to win a third consecutive Premier League title and lost to Everton in the FA Cup final.

During the following season Bruce was offered the job of manager by three clubs, but Ferguson refused to allow him to pursue the opportunities as he felt the player still had a role to play in the United team. Bruce made a further 30 Premier League appearances, as United managed to overcome a 12-point deficit to Newcastle United to win the championship once again. A week later he was left out of United's squad for the FA Cup final due to a slight injury. At the end of the match Eric Cantona, who had captained the team and scored the only goal in a 1–0 win over Liverpool, attempted to persuade Bruce to be the one to receive the trophy, but Bruce declined. Ferguson denied that Bruce's omission was a sign that his time at the club was nearing an end, but Bruce opted to join First Division club Birmingham City on a free transfer, having signed a contract valued at nearly £2 million over two years, which made him one of the highest-paid players in the country.

=== Later playing career ===
Bruce was among five former Premier League players signed by Birmingham manager Trevor Francis to add experience to a squad expected to challenge for promotion. He was made captain of the team, but his Birmingham career was dogged by a series of disagreements with Francis. Director David Sullivan felt the need to publicly deny rumours that Bruce was lined up to replace Francis as manager after the club's stock market flotation. While playing for Birmingham, Bruce was the subject of several bids from his old Manchester United colleague Bryan Robson to sign for Middlesbrough, but the transfer never happened.

The 1997–98 season saw Bruce being left out more frequently, and his omission against Nottingham Forest provoked a public war of words, which fuelled rumours that the manager was to be dismissed and that Bruce would take over as caretaker until the end of the season. At the end of the season he accepted the post of player-manager of Sheffield United. Though the deal was delayed while Birmingham attempted to negotiate a transfer fee for his playing contract, he took up his new position on 2 July 1998. He played 11 matches for the club before retiring as a player, his final appearance being in a home match against Sunderland on 28 November 1998.

== Style of play ==
During the early part of his career, Bruce's sometimes over-enthusiastic playing style, which he later described as "rampaging", caused him disciplinary problems. He later developed into a solid and dependable all-round player, characterised as "an honest trier who made the absolute most of limited natural ability". In his prime, he was particularly noted for his calm and deliberate passing of the ball, and his ability to control it under pressure, often with his chest. At the time, Mark Wright of Liverpool was said to be the only other centre-back able to match Bruce's level of skill in these areas.

Bruce was also known for his unusually high goalscoring rate for a centre-back, resulting from a combination of his ability to powerfully head the ball and his effectiveness in taking penalty kicks. Although lacking poise and grace, and often criticised for his lack of pace, his bravery and willingness to take knocks from opposition players made him the "heart" of the defence during his time with Manchester United. He was well known for continuing to play even when injured, including returning to the United team at short notice in 1992 even though he was awaiting an operation on a hernia. His indomitable spirit and motivational abilities were deemed vital to the United team, and Alex Ferguson has commented on his "determination and heart".

== Managerial career ==
=== Early managerial career ===
In his first season as a manager, Bruce guided Sheffield United to eighth place in the First Division, nine points away from a place in the play-offs. He caused controversy when he attempted to take his team off the pitch during an FA Cup match against Arsenal. Bruce felt that the Gunners had broken an unwritten rule of sportsmanship by scoring the winning goal from a throw-in instead of returning the ball to United, who had intentionally kicked it out of play to allow an injured player to be attended to. Although the game eventually continued to a finish, following a gesture by Arsenal the match was declared void and replayed. In May 1999, Bruce resigned from his post after just one season in charge, citing turmoil in the club's boardroom and a shortage of funds for transfers. He contemplated leaving football for a job in television, but was persuaded by Huddersfield Town owner Barry Rubery to become the club's manager.

Huddersfield were early promotion contenders in the 1999–2000 season, winning six consecutive matches to rise to third place in the First Division table by late November, but lost form and failed to reach the play-offs. The team continued to struggle at the start of the 2000–01 season, gaining just six points from 11 matches, and Bruce was sacked in October 2000. From November 1999 until his departure, Bruce was on the club's board of directors. He then became involved in a dispute with Rubery, who accused him of "wasting" £3 million on players and having "an ego to feed". Although he was linked with the manager's job at Queens Park Rangers, Bruce remained out of the game until he was appointed manager of Wigan Athletic in April 2001. The team reached the Second Division play-offs but lost in the semi-finals, and Bruce almost immediately left the club, where he had been in charge for less than two months, to take over as manager of Crystal Palace.

Although his new club began the 2001–02 season strongly, topping the First Division table and looking well placed for regaining the Premier League place that it had last held in the 1997–98 season, Bruce tendered his resignation less than three months into the season in order to return to Birmingham City as manager. Although he was initially prevented from doing so by an injunction taken out by Crystal Palace, he was eventually allowed to join the Midlands-based club after a compensation package was agreed. By now he had acquired a reputation as a manager who rarely held down a job for a significant length of time.

=== Birmingham City ===
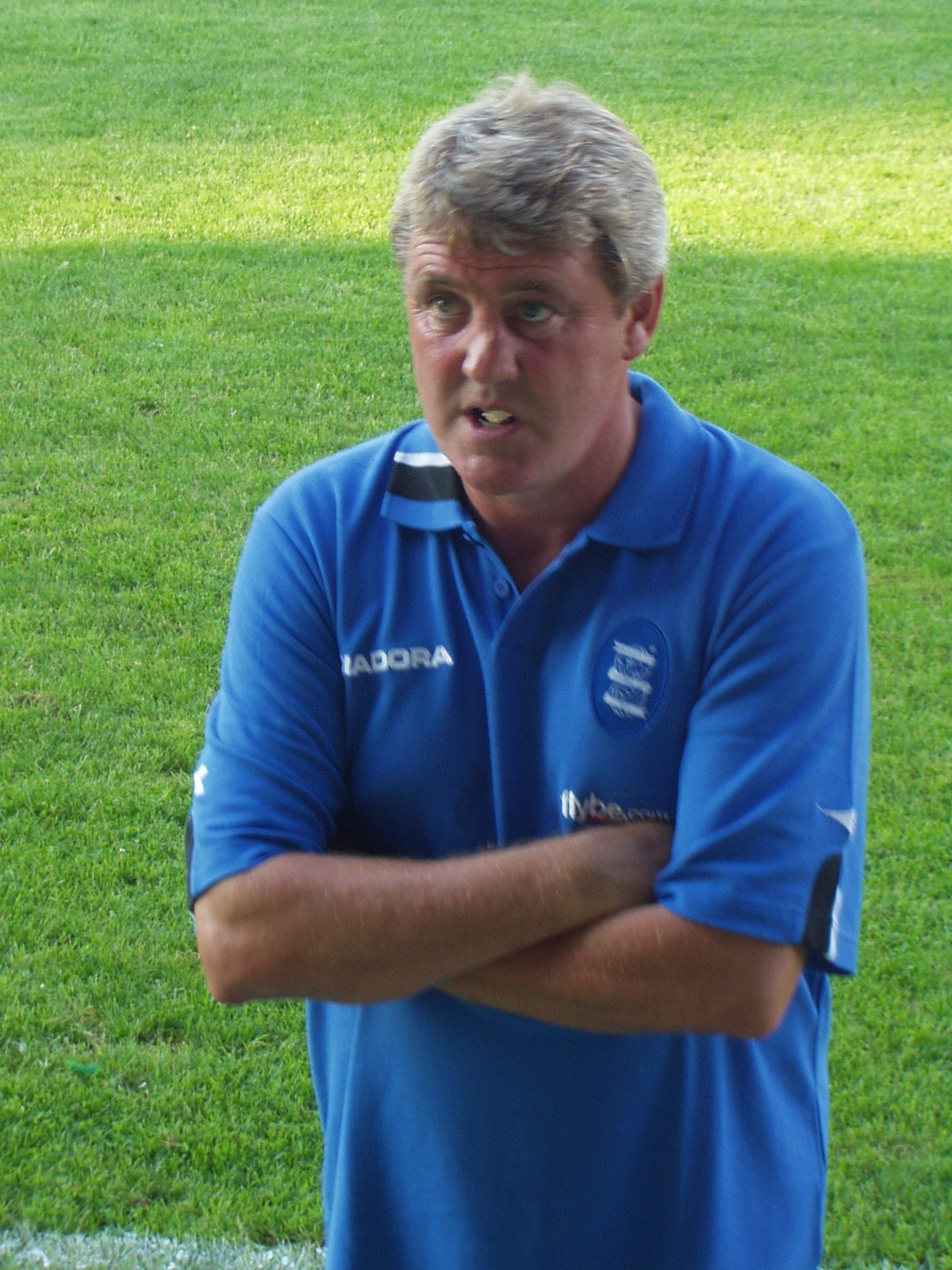
Bruce managing Birmingham City in 2004

Upon his arrival, the Blues were in a mid-table position in the First Division, but a lengthy unbeaten run saw the team qualify for the play-offs. The team went on to beat Bruce's former club Norwich City in the final after a penalty shoot-out to gain promotion to the Premier League, ending a 16-year absence from the top level of English football. Birmingham spent the early part of the 2002–03 season struggling near the foot of the Premier League table, but Bruce's signing of Christophe Dugarry revitalised the team, who ended the season in 13th place and finished higher than local rivals Aston Villa for the first time since the 1970s.

The following season began well for Birmingham, who climbed as high as fourth in the table, but the team's fortunes declined and they could only finish in tenth place at the end of the season. Despite this disappointment, Bruce signed a new contract in June 2004 designed to keep him at St Andrew's for a further five years, but just two months later Freddy Shepherd, chairman of Newcastle United, was reported to have made Bruce his main target in the search for a new manager to replace Bobby Robson. The club was reportedly prepared to pay Birmingham more than £3 million in compensation, and Bruce himself was said to be keen to take over at St James' Park, but he ultimately remained at Birmingham. He stated that "as far as I'm concerned, I've got a job to do [at Birmingham City] and I'm determined to get on with it", but it was also reported that Newcastle would have been required to pay a much larger compensation fee or face legal action had he been persuaded to switch clubs. Initial expectations were high for the 2004–05 season, but the club once again finished in a mid-table position, ending the season in 12th place.

Following the sacking of Graeme Souness as Newcastle manager in February 2006, Bruce was again linked with the job, which ultimately went to Glenn Roeder. By this stage of the 2005–06 season, Birmingham were struggling in the league, and on 21 March 2006 were beaten 7–0 at home by Liverpool in the FA Cup quarter-finals. Some supporters of the club began to call for his resignation, but Bruce insisted that he would fight on as manager. The team managed to climb out of the relegation zone for the first time in nearly six months after a win over Bolton Wanderers in early April 2006. However, they were soon overtaken by Portsmouth, whose victory over Wigan Athletic on 29 April left Birmingham mathematically unable to match their points total and therefore relegated.

Although Bruce had the largest transfer budget in the division made available to him, Birmingham made a slow start to the 2006–07 season in the Championship and, after a 1–0 defeat at home to Norwich City, the team's fifth consecutive match without a win, there were calls from fans and local journalists for the manager to be sacked. Bruce publicly accepted responsibility for the team's poor run and admitted that he feared for his job, but the team responded with a 1–0 victory over Derby County, and then recorded a further five consecutive league victories to be joint leaders of the league table by late November. On 29 April 2007, Birmingham secured promotion to the Premier League, with one match to play, by virtue of Derby County's 2–0 defeat at Crystal Palace. Chairman David Gold told the press "There have been some dark days but Steve has been outstanding. He was determined to bounce back. He has rebuilt the team and now we are all back where we want to be."

=== Wigan Athletic ===
In May 2007, Birmingham's board agreed a new contract for Bruce, but the unwillingness of the club's prospective purchaser Carson Yeung to ratify it left his future uncertain. In October 2007, Bolton Wanderers were refused permission to speak to him about their managerial vacancy. Later that month, Bruce and Yeung held a meeting which reportedly had positive results. Bruce later claimed that Birmingham's managing director Karren Brady had "shafted" him on a new contract with the club, and when Wigan Athletic requested permission to speak to Bruce about their managerial vacancy, he was receptive to their approach. As required under the terms of his contract, Wigan agreed to pay Birmingham a then-world record compensation for the loss of his services of around £3 million, and they were then allowed to speak to him. On 19 November, Wigan announced the signing of Bruce for a second time.

On 21 November, during a press conference which was intended to formally present Bruce as the new manager of Wigan, the club's chief executive Brenda Spencer informed the media that the deal had been put on hold by "unknown issues" between Bruce and Birmingham City, reported to centre on the advance payment of the image rights element of Bruce's contract at St Andrew's. On 23 November 2007 Wigan announced that Bruce had now signed his contract and would officially rejoin the Latics. His first game in charge was a 1–1 home draw with Manchester City on 1 December 2007. Wigan spent the remainder of the season struggling against relegation, but the club secured Premier League survival with victory over Aston Villa in the penultimate game of the season. In September 2008, Bruce was once again linked with the manager's job at Newcastle United following the departure of Kevin Keegan.

Bruce led Wigan to an 11th-place finish in the 2008–09 season, despite the loss of midfielder Wilson Palacios to Tottenham Hotspur in the January transfer window.

=== Sunderland ===
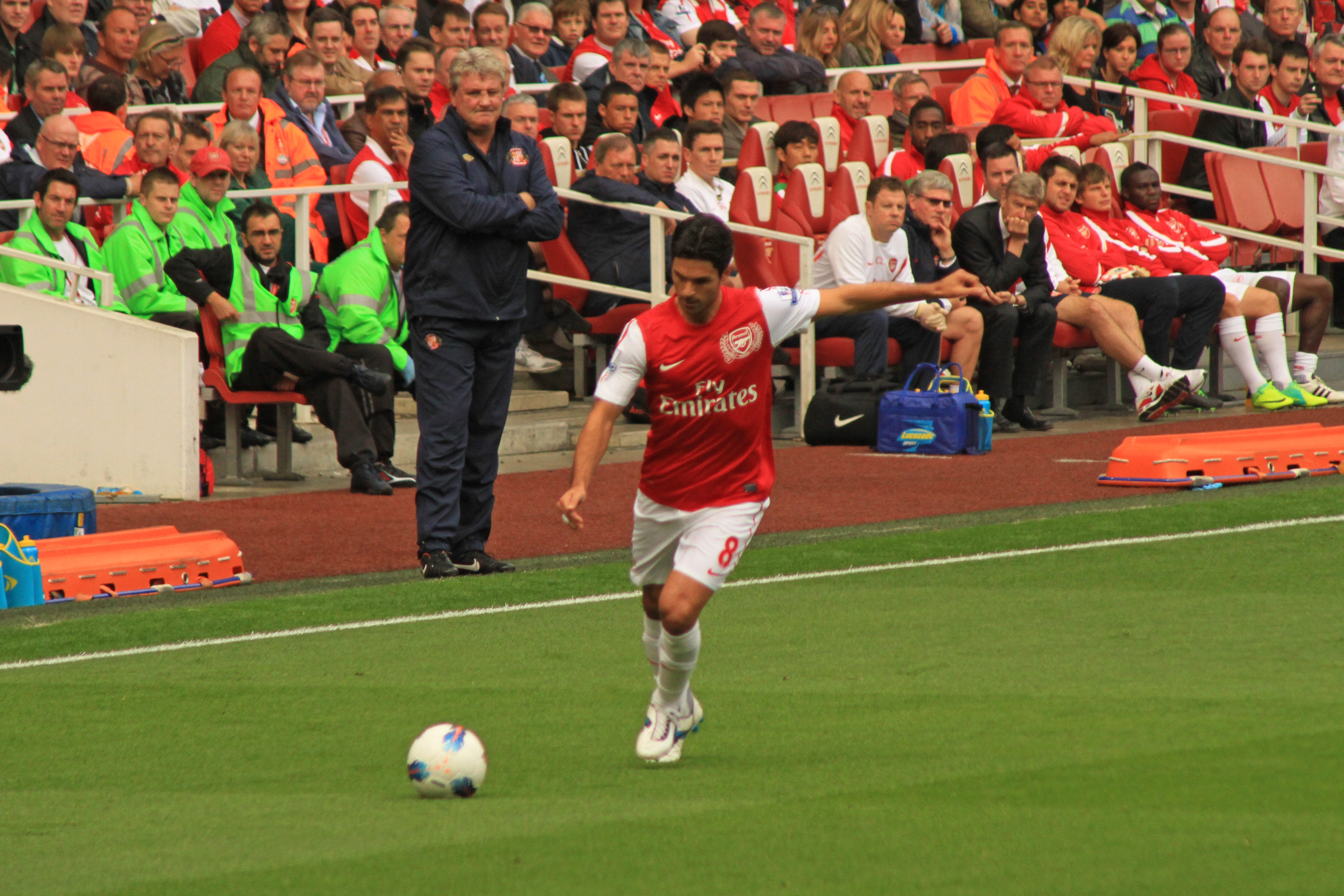
Bruce managing Sunderland in 2011

On 27 May 2009, Bruce was reported to have been given permission to talk to Sunderland about succeeding Ricky Sbragia, who resigned as manager after the last match of the season. Bruce was confirmed as the new manager of Sunderland on 3 June after signing a three-year contract. He was joined at Sunderland by three of his former Wigan Athletic coaching staff, assistant Eric Black, goalkeeping coach Nigel Spink, and reserve team coach Keith Bertschin. In his first season at Sunderland, despite a run of 14 games without a win, Bruce led the Black Cats to a 13th-place finish in the Premier League.

Bruce made wholesale changes to Sunderland's squad, signing 13 players and selling 15 in his first 18 months at the club. On 25 February 2011, Bruce signed an extension to his contract, keeping him at Sunderland until 2014, with chairman Niall Quinn stating that "In only 18 months he has reshaped our squad beyond recognition, bringing in some fantastically talented players. He embodies the ethos of teamwork and the importance of camaraderie in creating a wonderful spirit of togetherness amongst the players and staff".

Bruce was dismissed as manager on 30 November 2011, with Sunderland in 16th position following a poor run of form which culminated with a 2–1 home defeat to bottom club Wigan four days earlier. He later linked his dismissal from the managerial post with the fact that he is a fan of Newcastle United, Sunderland's bitter rivals.

=== Hull City ===
On 8 June 2012, Bruce was appointed as manager at Championship club Hull City on a three-year contract. In his first season with the club, he led them to promotion to the Premier League, clinching second place in the Championship on the final day of the season. The following season, the "Tigers" came 16th with a club record tally of 37 points, and reached the final of the FA Cup for the first time. They took a two-goal lead in the first ten minutes of the final, but opponents Arsenal scored a goal in each half to take the game into extra-time and then scored a third to win the trophy. Reaching the final qualified Hull for the 2014–15 UEFA Europa League, their first European campaign.

In March 2015, Bruce signed a three-year contract extension. A run of poor form left Hull near the bottom of the table going into the final game of the 2014–15 season and needing to defeat Bruce's former club Manchester United to stand any chance of avoiding relegation. They could only manage a 0–0 draw and were relegated to the Championship. The poor performances of a number of players signed by Bruce, including club record signing Abel Hernández, were identified as key factors in the club's failure to remain in the Premier League.

In January 2016, Bruce won the Championship Manager of the Month after leading Hull to four victories; Hernández, who scored six times, got the players' equivalent. Hull finished the season in fourth, qualifying for the play-offs, where they defeated Derby County in the semi-finals. In the final on 28 May, a 25-yard goal from Mohamed Diamé against Sheffield Wednesday won Hull promotion to the Premier League for the second time during Bruce's spell in charge. Bruce said after the game that he had considered resignation following the team's relegation, and would hold talks with the prospective new owners to be assured of his future. In July 2016, with his future at Hull seemingly still uncertain, he was interviewed by officials of The Football Association concerning the vacant position of manager of England. Three days later, Bruce met with Hull City officials and announced his resignation later that day amid claims he became frustrated by a lack of transfer activity at the club.

=== Aston Villa ===
On 12 October 2016, Bruce was appointed manager of Championship club Aston Villa. Former Chelsea boss Roberto Di Matteo had just been dismissed after 12 games following a poor start to the season. In his second match in charge, Villa defeated Reading, the club's first win in 11 games and the first away win for 14 months.

Bruce brought in Colin Calderwood as assistant manager from Brighton & Hove Albion and Stephen Clemence from old club Hull City as first-team coach. In the 2017–18 season, Villa secured a play-off place and defeated Middlesbrough to reach the final, but lost 1–0 to Fulham in the final and thus missed out on promotion to the Premier League.

On 2 October 2018, Villa surrendered a two-goal lead, drawing 3–3 at home to bottom club Preston North End. One spectator threw a cabbage at Bruce and there were calls from home fans on the Holte End for Bruce to go. The following day, he was sacked by Villa after a poor run of form.

=== Sheffield Wednesday ===
In January 2019, Bruce was appointed manager of Championship club Sheffield Wednesday with effect from the start of the following month. On 27 January, his delay in taking up this appointment was criticised by Match of the Day pundits Danny Murphy and Ruud Gullit during a 3–0 FA Cup defeat away to Chelsea. Bruce subsequently defended his decision, as he had had two operations since leaving Aston Villa and needed time to recuperate, as well as the need to recover from the death of both his parents in 2018.

=== Newcastle United ===
BBC Sport reported in July 2019 that Bruce had resigned from his position at Wednesday, after he earlier admitted that he had held talks with Premier League Newcastle United over their managerial vacancy. His appointment at Newcastle was confirmed on 17 July. Sheffield Wednesday, however, soon filed a report to the Premier League alleging misconduct in his appointment, stating that there were still outstanding legal issues with Bruce having resigned just 48 hours earlier, whilst also suspecting that confidential details of Bruce's contract were leaked making it impossible for him to remain at the club. Newcastle United denied any wrongdoing and stated that they were confident no case could be escalated. Reaction from the fans was mixed, with some feeling Bruce would not achieve the standard set by his predecessor Rafael Benítez, whilst his recent lack of Premier League football and management of rival club Sunderland proved controversial. Bruce acknowledged Benítez's popularity, and stated he hoped the fans would not rush to judgement and give him time to prove himself. Bruce soon made six signings, notably securing Joelinton from 1899 Hoffenheim for £40 million, breaking the club's transfer fee record previously set by the purchase of Miguel Almirón for £21 million six months earlier.

In his first season in charge, Newcastle were tipped for relegation by some pundits but finished 13th, as the campaign was interrupted by the COVID-19 pandemic. The following season, almost entirely played behind closed doors due to the pandemic, saw Bruce guide the club to a 12th place finish. In October 2021, the club was bought for £300 million by a consortium led by the Saudi Arabian government's sovereign wealth fund. With the team close to the bottom of the Premier League, Bruce was widely expected to be dismissed from his job by the new owners, but remained in charge and was recognised by the League Managers Association as only the 34th manager in the modern era of English football to have taken charge for 1,000 competitive matches. Newcastle lost that match 3–2 to Tottenham Hotspur at St James' Park on 17 October 2021, and some Newcastle supporters called for Bruce to be removed from his post during and after the game. Bruce left Newcastle by mutual consent three days later on 20 October 2021, after receiving a reported £8 million payout for the remainder of his contract. He had a 27.4% win percentage from 84 league games at Newcastle, the 9th best compared to previous Newcastle managers who had been in charge of at least 20 matches in the Premier League era.

=== West Bromwich Albion ===
On 3 February 2022, Bruce was appointed manager of EFL Championship club West Bromwich Albion, replacing Valérien Ismaël. Bruce signed an 18-month contract with West Brom who, at the time, were in sixth place in the Championship. He left the role eight months later with the team 22nd in the division, their lowest league position for more than two decades.

=== Blackpool ===
Bruce was appointed head coach of EFL League One team Blackpool on 3 September 2024, replacing Neil Critchley. Following a perfect start to his time in charge, winning his first four matches, he was named EFL League One Manager of the Month for September 2024. On 4 October 2025, Bruce was sacked as manager after a 2–0 defeat to AFC Wimbledon left the club second-bottom of the table. The following month, Bruce admitted it is unlikely he will manage a club again, but did not rule out an advisory role.

On 29 April 2026, Bruce announced his retirement as a manager.

== Life outside football ==
=== Personal life ===
Bruce has been married since February 1983 to Janet (née Smith), who is also from the Hexham area, and went to the same school as Bruce. The couple have two children, Alex (born 1984) and Amy (born 1987). Alex also became a professional footballer, and was signed by his father for Hull City in July 2012. He had previously played under his father's management at Birmingham City, but left the club in 2006, in part due to accusations of nepotism levelled at his father. Amy was linked romantically with Aston Villa player Lee Hendrie in tabloid newspaper stories in 2004, which provoked an angry response from her father, who described the reports as "lies", and claimed that journalists had gone so far as to contact his doctor and examine his household waste in an attempt to uncover gossip. In September 2004, Bruce was involved in an altercation outside his home with two men who were attempting to steal his daughter's car. The affray left him with facial injuries but did not prevent him from travelling to a Premier League match the same day. After the incident, one newspaper attempted to connect it with the allegations concerning Hendrie, leading Bruce to contemplate legal action.

=== Other activities ===
Bruce's autobiography, Heading for Victory, was published in 1994. In 1999, while manager of Huddersfield, he wrote a trio of novels: Striker!, Sweeper! and Defender! The books centred on fictional football manager Steve Barnes, based on Bruce, who solved murder mysteries and thwarted terrorists. Bruce later expressed his embarrassment at the books, which have become sought-after collectables. He intended to publish a new autobiography in late 2019 but the book was postponed indefinitely due to the deaths of his parents and his desire to concentrate on his job at Newcastle.

== Playing statistics ==
Appearances and goals by club, season and competition
| Club | Season | League | | | FA Cup | | League Cup | | Europe | | Other | | Total | |
| Club | Season | Division | Apps | Goals | Apps | Goals | Apps | Goals | Apps | Goals | Apps | Goals | Apps | Goals |
|---|---|---|---|---|---|---|---|---|---|---|---|---|---|---|
| Gillingham | 1979–80 | Third Division | 40 | 6 | 0 | 0 | 4 | 2 | — | | — | | 44 | 8 |
| Gillingham | 1980–81 | Third Division | 41 | 4 | 1 | 0 | 4 | 3 | — | | — | | 46 | 7 |
| Gillingham | 1981–82 | Third Division | 45 | 6 | 5 | 1 | 2 | 0 | — | | 3 (Note: Appearances in Football League Group Cup) | 1 | 55 | 8 |
| Gillingham | 1982–83 | Third Division | 39 | 7 | 2 | 0 | 5 | 1 | — | | — | | 46 | 8 |
| Gillingham | 1983–84 | Third Division | 40 | 6 | 6 | 1 | 0 | 0 | — | | 0 | 0 | 46 | 7 |
| Gillingham | Total | | 205 | 29 | 14 | 2 | 15 | 6 | — | | 3 | 1 | 237 | 38 |
| Norwich City | 1984–85 | First Division | 39 | 1 | 5 | 1 | 9 | 3 | — | | — | | 53 | 5 |
| Norwich City | 1985–86 | Second Division | 42 | 8 | 1 | 0 | 4 | 2 | — | | 6 (Note: Appearances in Football League Super Cup) | 0 | 53 | 10 |
| Norwich City | 1986–87 | First Division | 41 | 3 | 3 | 0 | 4 | 0 | — | | 4 (Note: Appearances in Full Members' Cup) | 0 | 52 | 3 |
| Norwich City | 1987–88 | First Division | 19 | 2 | — | | 3 | 1 | — | | — | | 22 | 3 |
| Norwich City | Total | | 141 | 14 | 9 | 1 | 20 | 6 | — | | 10 | 0 | 180 | 21 |
| Manchester United | 1987–88 | First Division | 21 | 2 | 3 | 0 | — | | — | | — | | 24 | 2 |
| Manchester United | 1988–89 | First Division | 38 | 2 | 7 | 1 | 3 | 1 | — | | 3 (Note: Appearances in Football League Centenary Trophy) | 1 | 51 | 5 |
| Manchester United | 1989–90 | First Division | 34 | 3 | 7 | 0 | 2 | 0 | — | | — | | 43 | 3 |
| Manchester United | 1990–91 | First Division | 31 | 13 | 3 | 0 | 7 | 2 | 8 (Note: Appearances in European Cup Winners' Cup) | 4 | 1 (Note: Appearance in FA Charity Shield) | 0 | 50 | 19 |
| Manchester United | 1991–92 | First Division | 37 | 5 | 1 | 0 | 7 | 1 | 5 (Note: Four appearances in European Cup Winners' Cup, one in European Super Cup) | 0 | — | | 50 | 6 |
| Manchester United | 1992–93 | Premier League | 42 | 5 | 3 | 0 | 3 | 0 | 2 (Note: Appearances in UEFA Cup) | 0 | — | | 50 | 5 |
| Manchester United | 1993–94 | Premier League | 41 | 3 | 7 | 0 | 9 | 2 | 4 (Note: Appearances in UEFA Champions League) | 2 | 1 | 0 | 62 | 7 |
| Manchester United | 1994–95 | Premier League | 35 | 2 | 5 | 2 | 1 | 0 | 6 | 0 | 1 | 0 | 48 | 4 |
| Manchester United | 1995–96 | Premier League | 30 | 1 | 5 | 0 | 2 | 0 | 2 | 0 | — | | 39 | 1 |
| Manchester United | Total | | 309 | 36 | 41 | 3 | 34 | 6 | 27 | 6 | 6 | 1 | 417 | 52 |
| Birmingham City | 1996–97 | First Division | 32 | 0 | 3 | 1 | 4 | 0 | — | | — | | 39 | 1 |
| Birmingham City | 1997–98 | First Division | 40 | 2 | 3 | 0 | 2 | 0 | — | | — | | 45 | 2 |
| Birmingham City | Total | | 72 | 2 | 6 | 1 | 6 | 0 | — | | — | | 84 | 3 |
| Sheffield United | 1998–99 | First Division | 10 | 0 | 0 | 0 | 1 | 0 | — | | — | | 11 | 0 |
| Career total | | | 737 | 81 | 70 | 7 | 76 | 18 | 27 | 6 | 19 | 2 | 929 | 114 |

== Managerial statistics ==
As of match played 4 October 2025

Managerial record by team and tenure
| Team | From | To | Record | | | | | Ref. |
| Team | From | To | P | W | D | L | Win % | Ref. |
|---|---|---|---|---|---|---|---|---|
| Sheffield United | 2 July 1998 | 17 May 1999 | 55 | 22 | 15 | 18 | 40.0 | |
| Huddersfield Town | 24 May 1999 | 16 October 2000 | 66 | 25 | 16 | 25 | 37.9 | |
| Wigan Athletic | 4 April 2001 | 29 May 2001 | 8 | 3 | 2 | 3 | 37.5 | |
| Crystal Palace | 31 May 2001 | 2 November 2001 | 18 | 11 | 2 | 5 | 61.1 | |
| Birmingham City | 12 December 2001 | 23 November 2007 | 270 | 100 | 70 | 100 | 37.0 | |
| Wigan Athletic | 26 November 2007 | 3 June 2009 | 68 | 23 | 17 | 28 | 33.8 | |
| Sunderland | 3 June 2009 | 30 November 2011 | 98 | 29 | 28 | 41 | 29.6 | |
| Hull City | 8 June 2012 | 22 July 2016 | 201 | 82 | 44 | 75 | 40.8 | |
| Aston Villa | 12 October 2016 | 3 October 2018 | 102 | 46 | 25 | 31 | 45.1 | |
| Sheffield Wednesday | 1 February 2019 | 15 July 2019 | 18 | 7 | 8 | 3 | 38.9 | |
| Newcastle United | 17 July 2019 | 20 October 2021 | 97 | 28 | 28 | 41 | 28.9 | |
| West Bromwich Albion | 3 February 2022 | 10 October 2022 | 32 | 8 | 12 | 12 | 25.0 | |
| Blackpool | 3 September 2024 | 4 October 2025 | 61 | 21 | 19 | 21 | 34.4 | |
| Total | | | 1,094 | 405 | 286 | 403 | 37.0 | |

== Honours ==
=== Player ===
Norwich City

- Football League Cup: 1984–85
- Football League Second Division: 1985–86

Manchester United

- Premier League: 1992–93, 1993–94, 1995–96
- FA Cup: 1989–90, 1993–94, 1995–96
- Football League Cup: 1991–92; runner-up: 1990–91, 1993–94
- FA Charity Shield: 1990 (shared), 1993, 1994
- European Cup Winners' Cup: 1990–91
- European Super Cup: 1991

Individual

- Premier League 10 Seasons Awards Domestic Team of the Decade
- PFA Team of the Year: Division Two (1985–86), Division Three (1982–83, 1983–84)
- Gillingham Player of the Season: 1979–80, 1981–82
- Norwich City Player of the Season: 1984–85
- Birmingham City Player of the Season: 1997–98

=== Manager ===
Birmingham City

- Football League Championship runner-up: 2006–07
- Football League First Division play-offs: 2002

Hull City

- FA Cup runner-up: 2013–14
- Football League Championship runner-up: 2012–13
- Football League Championship play-offs: 2016

Individual

- Premier League Manager of the Month: April 2021
- EFL League One Manager of the Month: September 2024

== See also ==
- List of football managers with the most matches
