= Peter Mendham =

English footballer (born 1960)

Personal information
- Full name: Peter Stanley Mendham
- Date of birth: 9 April 1960 (age 66)
- Place of birth: King's Lynn, England
- Height: 5 ft 10 in (1.78 m)
- Position: Midfielder

Senior career*
Years	Team	Apps	(Gls)
1978–1987	Norwich City	211	(23)
1981	→ Miramar Rangers (loan)	6	
1987–1988	King's Lynn		
1988–1989	Watton United		
- Hammarby IF
- NAC Breda
1991–1992	Diss Town		
1992–1993	Wroxham		
1993–?	Diss Town		
- North Walsham
- Norwich United
- * Club domestic league appearances and goals

Peter Stanley Mendham (born 9 April 1960) is an English former professional footballer who played as a midfielder for Norwich City. He was played in the side that won the Milk Cup in 1985. In February 2007, he was sentenced to seven and a half years in prison for wounding with intent his girlfriend. His sentence was later reduced to five years. In 2011, he returned to football as assistant manager at Newmarket Town F.C.

== Career ==
Mendham came through the youth ranks at Carrow Road, and played 267 first-team games (211 in the league), and scored 29 goals for the Canaries. He was forced to retire because of injury in 1987. He was a member of the Norwich teams that won the Football League Cup in 1985, and the Second Division championship in 1986. Following his premature retirement, the club awarded Mendham a testimonial match against Real Sociedad, and he continued to work for the club for several years as 'Football in the Community Officer'.

After his retirement from the professional game, Mendham continued to play non-league football, and scored the winning goal for Diss Town in the final of the 1994 FA Vase at Wembley. He worked as a fundraiser for a charity in East Anglia after he stopped playing.

In the 1990s, Peter coached youths and children in the Norwich area.

In 2008–09 Mendham played for Sproughton Sports in the Suffolk and Ipswich League, Division 4.

== Criminal proceedings ==
On 19 October 2006, Mendham was arrested, and later charged with the attempted murder of his 39-year-old girlfriend at their house in Norwich after a heated argument. The woman had suffered a stab wound, and lost a kidney during emergency surgery.

In December 2006, Mendham denied the attempted murder charge, but one month later, he pleaded guilty to a reduced charge of wounding with intent. On 21 February 2007, Mendham was sentenced to seven and a half years in prison. On 24 May 2007, Mendham announced that he would appeal against the sentence.

He won the appeal and the sentence was reduced to five years.

== Honours ==
=== As a player ===
Norwich City

- Football League Second Division: 1985–86
- Football League Cup: 1984–85

Diss Town

- FA Vase: 1993–94

== Other sources ==
- Mike Davage, John Eastwood, Kevin Platt (2001). Canary Citizens. Jarrold Publishing. ISBN 0-7117-2020-7.
