= John Rigby (gunmaker) =

Irish gunmaker and marksman (1829–1916)

John Rigby (1829–1916) was the founder of rifle and shotgun maker John Rigby & Company.

Rigby was a world-class rifle marksman, forming the Irish team for the NRA's Imperial Meeting at Wimbledon (later Bisley) for twenty-eight years.

In 1887, he became superintendent of the Royal Small Arms Factory at Enfield Lock, where he oversaw development of the British service-issue .303 British calibre rifle. He also designed the .450 3¼-Inch Nitro Express and .416 Rigby. In addition, he collaborated with Mauser on redesigning the G98 to accept magnum cartridges.

Rigby was also mainly responsible for bringing Rigby's name to the fore in riflemaking.

== Sources ==
- Helsley, Steve. "Rigby Marks 275th Anniversary", in Safari: The Journal of Big Game Hunters, Safari Club International, Nov–Dec 2009, pp.24–7.
