= Mark Barham =

English footballer (born 1962)

Personal information
- Full name: Mark Francis Barham
- Date of birth: 12 July 1962 (age 64)
- Place of birth: Folkestone, England
- Height: 5 ft 7 in (1.70 m)
- Position: Midfielder

Senior career*
Years	Team	Apps	(Gls)
1980–1987	Norwich City	177	(23)
1987–1988	Huddersfield Town	27	(1)
1988–1989	Middlesbrough	4	(0)
1989	Hythe Town		
1989	West Bromwich Albion	4	(0)
1989–1992	Brighton & Hove Albion	73	(8)
1992	Shrewsbury Town	8	(1)
1992–1993	Kitchee	6	(2)
1993–1994	Sittingbourne	21	(4)
1995–1996	Southwick		
1996–1997	Fakenham Town		
1998	Mulbarton		

International career
1980	England Youth	1	(0)
1983	England	2	(0)
- * Club domestic league appearances and goals

Mark Francis Barham (born 12 July 1962) is an English former professional footballer who played as a right-winger.

Barham was a product of the Norwich City youth team, having signed him from his local club Folkestone and Shepway, and made his debut in the 1979–80 season against Manchester United.

He played 213 times for Norwich and scored 25 times. While with the club he was capped twice by England on their 1983 trip to Australia. He was a member of the Norwich sides that won the League Cup in 1985 and the Second Division championship in 1986.

Barham also played for Huddersfield and Middlesbrough, where a serious knee injury threatened to end his full-time career. He later played for Brighton & Hove Albion, before ending his professional career at Shrewsbury Town.

As well as working on corporate hospitality for Norwich City, Barham also runs his own tool-hire company in Norwich.

== Honours ==
Norwich City

- Football League Cup: 1984–85
