= Paul Haylock =

English footballer

Paul Haylock (born 24 March 1963) is an English former professional footballer.

== Career ==
Haylock, a full-back, came through the youth system at Norwich City and was part of the Norwich team that won promotion to Division One in 1982 and won the Football League Cup at Wembley Stadium in 1985. He played 193 games for Norwich before the arrival of Ian Culverhouse displaced him from the side.

He went on to play for Gillingham, where he was a crowd favourite (gaining the nickname "Pud" due to his slightly portly build) and a member of the side which reached the promotion play-offs in the 1986–87 season. In a League Cup match against Brighton & Hove Albion, Gills goalkeeper Phil Kite was sent off, and Haylock, despite being the shortest player in the team, took over in goal. The match ended in a draw and went to a penalty shoot out, and Haylock saved one of the Brighton kicks, enabling Gillingham to progress to the next round.

He later played for Maidstone United and Shrewsbury Town before moving into non-league football, and captained the newly reformed Maidstone United in the Kent County League. He also had a spell with Sittingbourne between 1995 and 1998 as player and assistant manager under firstly Steve Lovell and then Alan Walker.

== Honours ==
Norwich City

- Football League Cup: 1984–85
