= Arthur South =

Politician from Norfolk, England

Sir Arthur South (29 October 1914 – 28 January 2003) was a prominent Norfolk politician and administrator in the 1970s.

Having been Norwich City Council's youngest councillor, South led the council for 18 years and was Lord Mayor of Norwich for 1956–1957. He was knighted in the 1974 Birthday Honours.

He will be "remembered by football fans as a forthright chairman and high-profile ambassador of Norwich City Football Club (1973-1985)." It was in recognition of this that South was made an inaugural inductee of the Norwich City Hall of Fame. The South Stand at Carrow Road is not named in South's honour as is sometimes supposed. Research by the Norwich City Football Club Historical Trust has found the club was referring to "the south terrace" in the early 1950s before Arthur's involvement with the club. (The stand's orientation is actually south-east). Arthur performed the opening ceremony on behalf of the Supporters' Club, who funded the stand, in his role as a former Lord Mayor of Norwich but no entries in contemporary newspapers or the club's minute books refer to the stand being named after him. The Sir Arthur South Lounge, located within the River End stand of Carrow Road is, however, named in his honour.

The Arthur South Day Procedure Unit at the Norfolk and Norwich University Hospital is also named in South's honour.
