= David Williams (footballer, born 1955) =

Welsh footballer

Personal information
- Full name: David Michael Williams
- Date of birth: 11 March 1955 (age 71)
- Place of birth: Cardiff, Wales
- Height: 5 ft 10 in (1.78 m)
- Position: Midfielder

Senior career*
Years	Team	Apps	(Gls)
1975–1985	Bristol Rovers	352	(66)
1985–1992	Norwich City	74	(12)
1993	AFC Bournemouth	1	(0)

International career
1986	Wales	5	(0)

Managerial career
- 1983–1985: Bristol Rovers
- 1988: Wales (caretaker)
- 1992: Norwich City (caretaker)
- * Club domestic league appearances and goals

David Michael Williams (born 11 March 1955) is a Welsh former professional footballer who played as a midfielder, spending most of his career with Bristol Rovers. At international level, he made five appearances for the Wales national team.

== Playing career ==
=== Bristol Rovers ===
Williams started off in amateur football with Clifton Athletic before joining Bristol Rovers in 1975. Unusually, he began with the League club as an amateur, combining playing League football with studying on a teacher training course, and later with teaching at Mostyn High School in Cardiff. After already making 113 League appearances, he finally turned fully professional in 1978.

In May 1983, he was promoted to the position of player-manager after Bobby Gould left. He won 51 of his 108 games in the post, and won the Gloucestershire Cup twice.

=== Norwich City ===
Williams was still player-manager of Rovers when Norwich City manager Ken Brown took him to Carrow Road before the start of the 1985–86 season. Williams won a second division championship medal in his first season with the Canaries and went on to serve the club as player-coach, assistant manager and, for one game, caretaker manager before he left in 1992.

=== Welsh international ===
It was during his time with Norwich in Division 1 that he played five times for the Wales national team. In 1988, he also coached Wales as caretaker manager, including a 3–1 loss against Yugoslavia, prior to the appointment of Terry Yorath.

== Managerial and coaching career ==
In July 1992 Williams was appointed assistant manager at AFC Bournemouth. He also made one appearance as a player towards the end of the 1992–93 season. In February 1994 he took on the same position at Everton before becoming reserve team coach at Leeds United. After completing a youth team coaching role at Manchester United in 2002, he spent some time as a driving instructor in Harrogate, returning to Norwich to as Assistant Academy Manager in the summer of 2004.

In addition to his role at Carrow Road, he also coached the Welsh international youth sides as assistant to Brian Flynn. In May 2007 at the age of 52 Williams left Norwich and retired from club coaching though continued his involvement with the Welsh youth squads. He briefly became assistant manager of the Welsh team when Flynn was appointed caretaker in September 2010.

In February 2013, soon after Flynn had been made manager of Doncaster Rovers, he appointed Williams as his assistant. Williams left the role at the end of the 2012–13 season.

== Honours ==
Norwich City

- Football League Second Division (Level 2): 1985–86

Individual

- Norwich City F.C. Hall of Fame: 2002
