= Paul Clayton (footballer) =

English footballer

Personal information
- Full name: Paul Spencer Clayton
- Date of birth: 4 January 1965 (age 61)
- Place of birth: Dunstable, England
- Height: 5 ft 11 in (1.80 m)
- Position: Forward

Youth career
- Norwich City

Senior career*
Years	Team	Apps	(Gls)
1983–1986	Norwich City	15	(0)
1986–1988	Örebro SK		
1988–1989	Darlington	20	(3)
1989–1991	Crewe Alexandra	51	(12)
1991–1992	Macclesfield Town	24	(1)
19??–19??	Stafford Rangers		
1994–1995	Stalybridge Celtic	51	(12)
19??–19??	Northwich Victoria		(?)
- * Club domestic league appearances and goals

Paul Spencer Clayton (born 4 January 1965) is an English former professional footballer.

== Career ==
Clayton began his career with Norwich City. He was a member of the club's youth team that won the FA Youth Cup in 1983 and scored twice in the final. However, he was unable to establish himself in the Norwich first team - making just 15 league appearances without scoring - and moved to Darlington in 1988 for a fee of £25,000, a Darlington club record. After scoring three goals in 22 games he moved to Crewe Alexandra in 1989.

After playing non-league football for Macclesfield Town, Stafford Rangers, Stalybridge Celtic and Northwich Victoria, Clayton left football and worked for the National Health Service as a hospital theatre technician.

== Personal life ==
Paul is married with two sons who have both played for Crewe Alexandra, Harry and Max.

== Sources ==
- Mark Davage; John Eastwood; Kevin Platt (2001). Canary Citizens. Jarrold Publishing. ISBN 0-7117-2020-7.
