= Tony Spearing =

English footballer

Personal information
- Full name: Anthony Spearing
- Date of birth: 7 October 1964 (age 62)
- Place of birth: Romford, England
- Height: 5 ft 9 in (1.75 m)
- Position: Defender

Youth career
- 1982–1984: Norwich City

Senior career*
| Years | Team | Apps | (Gls) |
| 1984–1988 | Norwich City | 69 | (0) |
| 1984 | → Stoke City (loan) | 9 | (0) |
| 1985 | → Oxford United (loan) | 5 | (0) |
| 1988–1991 | Leicester City | 73 | (1) |
| 1991–1993 | Plymouth Argyle | 35 | (0) |
| 1993–1997 | Peterborough United | 111 | (2) |
| 1997–2002 | King's Lynn | | |
| 2002–2003 | A.F.C. Sudbury | | |
| 2003–2004 | Wisbech Town | | |
| 2004–2005 | Great Yarmouth Town | | |

International career
| 1983 | England Youth | 4 | (0) |

Managerial career
- 1998: King's Lynn
- 2000–2002: King's Lynn
- * Club domestic league appearances and goals

Anthony Spearing (born 7 October 1964) is an English former footballer who played in the Football League for Norwich City, Stoke City, Oxford United, Leicester City, Plymouth Argyle and Peterborough United.

== Playing career ==
Spearing was born in Romford and began his career with Norwich City and was a member of their youth team that won the 1983 FA Youth Cup, beating Everton in a replayed final. His first two seasons at Carrow Road saw Spearing in the reserves and also spent time out on loan in 1984–85 at Stoke City (making nine appearances) and Oxford United (making five appearances).

Spearing played 10 times for Norwich in 1985–86 as they won the Second Division. Spearing was a regular under Dave Stringer in 1986–87 playing in 48 matches before losing his place to Mark Bowen and in 1988 he joined Leicester City for a fee of £100,000. He spent three seasons with the Foxes making 79 appearances scoring once before moving on to Plymouth Argyle. At Home Park Spearing made 45 appearances and the spent five seasons with Peterborough United making 132 appearances before dropping into non-league football with King's Lynn. He later played for A.F.C. Sudbury, Wisbech Town and Great Yarmouth Town.

== Management career ==
Spearing became manager of King's Lynn in 1998 but quickly relinquished the position and returned to his playing duties, though he was re-appointed as manager in 2000 and remained in the position for a further two years. He went on to play for A.F.C. Sudbury, Wisbech and Great Yarmouth before taking up his position of assistant manager at Cambridge United in 2005. Spearing left the Abbey Stadium when Rob Newman was sacked in September 2006 after a defeat against Exeter left the U's second-bottom of the Conference. Spearing returned to Carrow Road to play in the centenary match against Harwich & Parkeston in September 2002.

Spearing was a member of the Leicester City masters side that beat Chelsea in 2005 to win the grand final of the Sky TV Masters indoor league. He became a Senior Scout For Blackburn Rovers, working within the Premiership and Europe, but, in March 2008, left Blackburn to take up an offer from West Bromwich Albion to become the Head of European recruitment. After leaving The Hawthorns in January 2015, he was immediately appointed as Head of Scouting & Recruitment at Reading, teaming up once again with former Albion Head Coach, Steve Clarke.

On 8 April 2016 Spearing was announced as the newly appointed Head of Football Recruitment at his former club Norwich City.

== Career statistics ==
| Club | Season | League | | | FA Cup | | League Cup | | Other^{[A]} | | Total | |
| Club | Season | Division | Apps | Goals | Apps | Goals | Apps | Goals | Apps | Goals | Apps | Goals |
|---|---|---|---|---|---|---|---|---|---|---|---|---|
| Norwich City | 1983–84 | First Division | 4 | 0 | 0 | 0 | 0 | 0 | 0 | 0 | 4 | 0 |
| Norwich City | 1984–85 | First Division | 0 | 0 | 1 | 0 | 0 | 0 | 0 | 0 | 1 | 0 |
| Norwich City | 1985–86 | Second Division | 8 | 0 | 0 | 0 | 1 | 0 | 1 | 0 | 10 | 0 |
| Norwich City | 1986–87 | First Division | 39 | 0 | 3 | 0 | 4 | 0 | 2 | 0 | 48 | 0 |
| Norwich City | 1987–88 | First Division | 18 | 0 | 0 | 0 | 0 | 0 | 0 | 0 | 18 | 0 |
| Norwich City | Total | | 69 | 0 | 4 | 0 | 5 | 0 | 3 | 0 | 81 | 0 |
| Stoke City (loan) | 1984–85 | First Division | 9 | 0 | 0 | 0 | 0 | 0 | 0 | 0 | 9 | 0 |
| Stoke City (loan) | Total | | 9 | 0 | 0 | 0 | 0 | 0 | 0 | 0 | 9 | 0 |
| Oxford United (loan) | 1984–85 | Second Division | 5 | 0 | 0 | 0 | 0 | 0 | 0 | 0 | 5 | 0 |
| Oxford United (loan) | Total | | 5 | 0 | 0 | 0 | 0 | 0 | 0 | 0 | 5 | 0 |
| Leicester City | 1988–89 | Second Division | 36 | 0 | 1 | 0 | 2 | 0 | 1 | 0 | 40 | 0 |
| Leicester City | 1989–90 | Second Division | 20 | 1 | 0 | 0 | 1 | 0 | 0 | 0 | 21 | 1 |
| Leicester City | 1990–91 | Second Division | 17 | 0 | 0 | 0 | 0 | 0 | 1 | 0 | 18 | 0 |
| Leicester City | Total | | 73 | 1 | 1 | 0 | 3 | 0 | 2 | 0 | 79 | 1 |
| Plymouth Argyle | 1991–92 | Second Division | 30 | 0 | 1 | 0 | 2 | 0 | 2 | 0 | 35 | 0 |
| Plymouth Argyle | 1992–93 | Division Two | 5 | 0 | 0 | 0 | 4 | 0 | 1 | 0 | 10 | 0 |
| Plymouth Argyle | Total | | 35 | 0 | 1 | 0 | 6 | 0 | 3 | 0 | 45 | 0 |
| Peterborough United | 1992–93 | Division One | 22 | 0 | 0 | 0 | 0 | 0 | 0 | 0 | 22 | 0 |
| Peterborough United | 1993–94 | Division One | 34 | 1 | 1 | 0 | 4 | 0 | 2 | 0 | 41 | 1 |
| Peterborough United | 1994–95 | Division Two | 33 | 0 | 2 | 0 | 0 | 0 | 3 | 0 | 38 | 0 |
| Peterborough United | 1995–96 | Division Two | 9 | 1 | 2 | 0 | 1 | 0 | 1 | 0 | 13 | 1 |
| Peterborough United | 1996–97 | Division Two | 13 | 0 | 1 | 0 | 2 | 0 | 2 | 0 | 18 | 0 |
| Peterborough United | Total | | 111 | 2 | 6 | 0 | 7 | 0 | 8 | 0 | 132 | 2 |
| Career Total | | | 302 | 3 | 12 | 0 | 21 | 0 | 16 | 0 | 351 | 3 |

A. The "Other" column constitutes appearances and goals in the Anglo-Italian Cup, Football League Trophy, Full Members' Cup and Screen Sport Super Cup.

== Honours ==
Norwich City

- Football League Second Division champions: 1985–86
- FA Youth Cup winner: 1983
