= Kevin Drinkell =

Footballer and manager (born 1960)

Personal information
- Full name: Kevin Smith Drinkell
- Date of birth: 18 June 1960 (age 66)
- Place of birth: Grimsby, England
- Height: 5 ft 11 in (1.80 m)
- Position: Centre forward

Senior career*
Years	Team	Apps	(Gls)
1976–1985	Grimsby Town	272	(89)
1985–1988	Norwich City	121	(50)
1988–1989	Rangers	36	(12)
1989–1991	Coventry City	41	(5)
1991	→ Birmingham City (loan)	5	(2)
1992–1994	Falkirk	55	(13)
1994–1995	Stirling Albion	21	(3)
Total		551	(174)

Managerial career
- 1994–1998: Stirling Albion
- 1998–2000: Montrose
- * Club domestic league appearances and goals

Kevin Smith Drinkell (born 18 June 1960) is an English former professional football player and manager. Drinkell was a centre forward, noted for his aerial ability and the number of headed goals he scored as a result.

== Career ==
Drinkell began his career with hometown club Grimsby Town where he scored 89 goals in 272 games. His goals got him noticed by other clubs and in 1985 Norwich City manager Ken Brown signed him for a fee of £90,000. Norwich were rebuilding their squad after relegation from the first division and had looked set to sign striker Trevor Senior from Reading, however when he opted to stay with the Royals they turned their attention to Drinkell. The fee was set by a Football League tribunal and the figure angered Grimsby, who considered his value to be much higher.

Drinkell quickly proved that Norwich had indeed got a bargain. In his first season at Carrow Road he scored 22 league goals as Norwich won the Second Division championship. With the Canaries being Football League Cup holders, Drinkell would also have experienced UEFA Cup action that season had it not been for the ban on English clubs in European competitions arising from the Heysel disaster in May 1985.

It won him the Golden Boot for being the division's top scorer as well as the first of two consecutive Norwich City player of the year awards. His goalscoring form continued in the First Division. His most memorable goal for Norwich came in a match against Liverpool on 11 April 1987 at Carrow Road. Liverpool were reigning league champions and were looking to regain the title. The score was 1–1 late in the game, when Drinkell picked up the ball at the edge of the area and hit a fierce shot from a difficult angle past Liverpool goalkeeper Bruce Grobbelaar. It ended one of the most famous statistics in football, as it was the first time that Liverpool had lost a league match in which Ian Rush had scored. Norwich finished fifth that season, but Drinkell and his colleagues were once again denied the chance of UEFA Cup action, as UEFA voted for the ban on English clubs in European competitions to continue for at least another season. Drinkell added a further 12 league goals in 1987–88, though the Canaries finished in the bottom half of the table this time – a decline in form which had seen Brown dismissed as manager in favour of coach Dave Stringer in December 1987.

In total, Drinkell scored 57 goals in 150 games for the Canaries.

In 1987, Drinkell rejected the chance of a move to Manchester United, just after the appointment of Alex Ferguson as their manager.

Drinkell's exploits earned him a £600,000 move to Rangers, who signed him ahead of Tottenham Hotspur in the 1988 close season. He won Scottish League Championship and Scottish League Cup medals at Ibrox, but lost his place to new signing Mo Johnston for the 1989–90 season and played just four more games for Rangers before his return to England in October 1989 when he signed for Coventry City in a deal worth around £800,000.

Despite scoring on his debut against his hometown team, Grimsby, in the Football League Cup, his goalscoring form deserted him at Highfield Road (he failed to score in any of his 15 league appearances in the 1990–91 season, and after a short loan spell with Birmingham City in the autumn of 1991 he began his coaching career in Scotland with Falkirk. He coached and managed Stirling Albion, gaining promotion to the First Division as Second Division champions in 1996, before becoming Montrose manager in 1998.

In 2002, Norwich City fans voted Drinkell an inaugural member of the Norwich City F.C. Hall of Fame.

As of 2012, Drinkell was working as a football player agent. He had a brief spell as assistant manager of Second Division club East Fife in 2013.

== Honours ==
Grimsby Town

- Football League Third Division: 1979–80
- Football League Fourth Division runner-up: 1978–79

Norwich City

- Football League Second Division: 1985–86

Rangers

- Scottish Premier Division: 1988–89
- Scottish League Cup: 1988–89

Falkirk

- Scottish First Division: 1993–94
- Scottish Challenge Cup: 1993–94

Individual

- Grimsby Town Supporters Young Player of the Year: 1977
- Grimsby Town Supporters' Player of the Year: 1983
- Norwich City Player of the Year: 1985–86, 1986–87
- Norwich City Hall of Fame inaugural member: 2002
