= Jon Rigby =

English footballer

Personal information
- Full name: Jonathan Kendall Rigby
- Date of birth: 31 January 1965 (age 61)
- Place of birth: Bury St Edmunds, England
- Height: 6 ft 1 in (1.85 m)
- Position: Forward

Youth career
- Norwich City

Senior career*
Years	Team	Apps	(Gls)
1983–1985	Norwich City	10	(0)
1983	Kokkolan Palloseura	9	(2)
1984	Kokkolan Palloseura		
1985	Kokkolan Palloseura		
1985–1986	Aldershot	1	(0)
1986	Kokkolan Palloseura		
1986–1988	Cambridge United	31	(6)
1987	Kokkolan Palloseura		
- Thetford Town
- Wroxham
- * Club domestic league appearances and goals

Jonathan Kendall Rigby (born 31 January 1965) is an English former professional footballer who played in the Football League for Norwich City, Aldershot and Cambridge United.

Rigby was born in Bury St Edmunds, and began his career with Norwich City, with whom he won a FA Youth Cup winner's medal in 1983. A forward, he made ten first-team appearances for Norwich, without scoring, and after that he played for Aldershot and Cambridge United. Summers 1983-1987 he played in Finland, Kokkola for Kokkolan Palloseura (KPS). In Finland he played in second-, third-, and fourth-highest division's. He retired from the professional game due to a pelvic injury, then played non-league football in Norfolk for Thetford Town and Wroxham.

== Honours ==
- FA Youth Cup winner: 1983
