= 1984–85 Football League Cup =

Milk Cup, League Cup
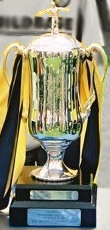
- The Milk Cup

Tournament details
- Country: England; Wales
- Teams: 92

Final positions
- Champions: Norwich City (2nd title)
- Runners-up: Sunderland

Tournament statistics
- Top goal scorer: Kerry Dixon (8 goals)

The 1984–85 Football League Cup (known as the Milk Cup for sponsorship reasons) was the 25th season of the Football League Cup, a knockout competition for England's top 92 football clubs.

The competition began on 27 August 1984, and ended with the final on 24 March 1985 at the Old Wembley Stadium. The cup was won by Norwich City, who beat Sunderland 1–0 in the final. An own goal from Sunderland's Gordon Chisholm gave Norwich the victory. At the end of the 1984–85 league season both Norwich and Sunderland were relegated to the Second Division. There was serious violence and a pitch invasion by some home supporters at the Stamford Bridge leg of the Chelsea-Sunderland semi-final, and although Norwich initially thought they had won a place in the 1985–86 UEFA Cup, they were denied what would have been their first season of European football by the ban that followed the Heysel Stadium disaster. Norwich eventually played in the UEFA Cup in 1993–94.

== First round ==
56 teams took part in the First round. All ties were decided over two legs.

Home team	First Leg	Second Leg	Agg.	Away team	Dates	
Home team	First Leg	Second Leg	Agg.	Away team	First Leg	Second Leg
Aldershot	4–0	1–0	5–0	Bournemouth	28 August 1984	4 September 1984
Blackpool	1–0	3–0	4–0	Chester City	28 August 1984	5 September 1984
Bolton Wanderers	2–1	4–4	6–5	Oldham Athletic	28 August 1984	4 September 1984
Bradford City	2–0	2–2	4–2	Middlesbrough	29 August 1984	4 September 1984
Brentford	2–0	0–1	2–1	Cambridge United	28 August 1984	4 September 1984
Bristol City	2–1	3–0	5–1	Newport County	28 August 1984	4 September 1984
Burnley	1–2	3–0	4–2	Crewe Alexandra	28 August 1984	4 September 1984
Crystal Palace	1–0	0–0	1–0	Northampton Town	27 August 1984	4 September 1984
Darlington	1–2	0–4	1–6	Rotherham United	28 August 1984	4 September 1984
Derby County	5–1	1–0	6–1	Hartlepool United	29 August 1984	5 September 1984
Doncaster Rovers	2–3	0–5	2–8	York City	28 August 1984	4 September 1984
Exeter City	1–0	0–2	1–2	Cardiff City	29 August 1984	4 September 1984
Gillingham	3–2	2–0	5–2	Colchester United	28 August 1984	4 September 1984
Halifax Town	1–1	2–1	3–2	Chesterfield	28 August 1984	4 September 1984
Hereford United	2–2	3–5	5–7	Oxford United	29 August 1984	4 September 1984
Lincoln City	0–2	1–4	1–6	Hull City	29 August 1984	4 September 1984
Leyton Orient	2–1	0–0	2–1	Southend United	28 August 1984	5 September 1984
Plymouth Argyle	1–0	1–0	2–0	Torquay United	27 August 1984	4 September 1984
Portsmouth	3–0	0–1	3–1	Wimbledon	28 August 1984	4 September 1984
Port Vale	1–0	1–2	2–2	Bury	28 August 1984	4 September 1984
Reading	1–1	3–4	4–5	Millwall	29 August 1984	4 September 1984
Scunthorpe United	0–1	2–1	2–2	Mansfield Town	28 August 1984	5 September 1984
Sheffield United	1–0	2–2	3–2	Peterborough United	28 August 1984	5 September 1984
Stockport County	3–1	2–1	5–2	Rochdale	27 August 1984	4 September 1984
Swansea City	0–2	1–3	1–5	Walsall	28 August 1984	4 September 1984
Swindon Town	1–5	1–0	2–5	Bristol Rovers	27 August 1984	4 September 1984
Tranmere Rovers	2-3	2–2	4–5	Preston North End	28 August 1984	4 September 1984
Wrexham	0–3	0–2	0–5	Wigan Athletic	28 August 1984	4 September 1984

== Second round ==
A total of 64 teams took place in this round. All ties were settled over two legs.

Home team	First Leg	Second Leg	Agg.	Away team	Dates	
Home team	First Leg	Second Leg	Agg.	Away team	First Leg	Second Leg
Arsenal	4–0	1–1	5–1	Bristol Rovers	25 September 1984	9 October 1984
Birmingham City	4–1	1–0	5–1	Plymouth Argyle	25 September 1984	9 October 1984
Blackburn Rovers	1–1	1–3	2–4	Oxford United	25 September 1984	10 October 1984
Brighton & Hove Albion	3–1	0–3	3–4	Aldershot	25 September 1984	9 October 1984
Bristol City	2–2	1–6	3–8	West Ham United	25 September 1984	9 October 1984
Charlton Athletic	0–1	0–2	0–3	Notts County	25 September 1984	9 October 1984
Chelsea	3–1	1–1	4–2	Millwall	26 September 1984	9 October 1984
Fulham	2–0	2–1	4–1	Carlisle United	25 September 1984	9 October 1984
Gillingham	1–2	2–3	3–5	Leeds United	25 September 1984	10 October 1984
Grimsby Town	3–0	1–1	4–1	Barnsley	25 September 1984	9 October 1984
Halifax Town	1–5	0–4	1–9	Tottenham Hotspur	26 September 1984	9 October 1984
Ipswich Town	4–2	1–1	5–3	Derby County	25 September 1984	10 October 1984
Leicester City	4–2	2–0	6–2	Brentford	26 September 1984	9 October 1984
Manchester City	4–2	3–1	7–3	Blackpool	25 September 1984	9 October 1984
Manchester United	4–0	3–0	7–0	Burnley	26 September 1984	9 October 1984
Newcastle United	3–1	1–0	4–1	Bradford City	26 September 1984	10 October 1984
Leyton Orient	1–4	1–3	2–7	Luton Town	25 September 1984	9 October 1984
Portsmouth	1–0	0–3	1–3	Nottingham Forest	25 September 1984	10 October 1984
Port Vale	1–2	0–0	1–2	Wolverhampton Wanderers	24 September 1984	9 October 1984
Preston North End	3–3	1–6	4–9	Norwich City	25 September 1984	10 October 1984
Scunthorpe United	2–3	1–3	3–6	Aston Villa	24 September 1984	10 October 1984
Sheffield United	2–2	0–4	2–6	Everton	26 September 1984	10 October 1984
Sheffield Wednesday	3–0	1–2	4–2	Huddersfield Town	25 September 1984	9 October 1984
Shrewsbury Town	2–2	1–2	3–4	Bolton Wanderers	25 September 1984	9 October 1984
Southampton	3–2	2–2	5–4	Hull City	25 September 1984	9 October 1984
Stockport County	0–0	0–2	0–2	Liverpool	24 September 1984	9 October 1984
Stoke City	1–2	1–1	2–3	Rotherham United	26 September 1984	9 October 1984
Sunderland	2–1	0–0	2–1	Crystal Palace	25 September 1984	10 October 1984
Walsall	1–2	3–0	4–2	Coventry City	25 September 1984	9 October 1984
Watford	3–1	0–1	3–2	Cardiff City	25 September 1984	9 October 1984
Wigan Athletic	0–0	1–3	1–3	West Bromwich Albion	25 September 1984	10 October 1984
York City	2–4	1–4	3–8	Queens Park Rangers	25 September 1984	9 October 1984

== Third round ==
The competitors in the Third round were made up from the 32 winners from the Second round.

=== Ties ===
Home team	Result	Away team	Date
Birmingham City	0–0	West Bromwich Albion	30 October 1984
Ipswich Town	1–1	Newcastle United	30 October 1984
Leeds United	0–4	Watford	31 October 1984
Luton Town	3–1	Leicester City	30 October 1984
Manchester City	0–0	West Ham United	31 October 1984
Manchester United	1–2	Everton	30 October 1984
Norwich City	0–0	Aldershot	31 October 1984
Nottingham Forest	1–1	Sunderland	31 October 1984
Notts County	6–1	Bolton Wanderers	30 October 1984
Oxford United	3–2	Arsenal	31 October 1984
Queens Park Rangers	1–0	Aston Villa	30 October 1984
Rotherham United	0–0	Grimsby Town	30 October 1984
Sheffield Wednesday	3–2	Fulham	30 October 1984
Southampton	2–2	Wolverhampton Wanderers	30 October 1984
Tottenham Hotspur	1–0	Liverpool	31 October 1984
Walsall	2–2	Chelsea	30 October 1984

=== Replays ===
Home team	Result	Away team	Date
Aldershot	0–4	Norwich City	6 November 1984
Chelsea	3–0	Walsall	6 November 1984
Grimsby Town	6–1	Rotherham United	6 November 1984
Newcastle United	1–2	Ipswich Town	7 November 1984
Sunderland	1–0	Nottingham Forest	6 November 1984
West Bromwich Albion	3–1	Birmingham City	7 November 1984
West Ham United	1–2	Manchester City	6 November 1984
Wolverhampton Wanderers	0–2	Southampton	6 November 1984

== Fourth round ==
The 16 winners from the Third round took part in the Fourth round. All ties were played over one leg.

=== Ties ===
Home team	Result	Away team	Date
Chelsea	4–1	Manchester City	21 November 1984
Everton	0–1	Grimsby Town	20 November 1984
Ipswich Town	2–1	Oxford United	20 November 1984
Norwich City	3–0	Notts County	21 November 1984
Sheffield Wednesday	4–2	Luton Town	20 November 1984
Southampton	1–1	Queens Park Rangers	20 November 1984
Sunderland	0–0	Tottenham Hotspur	21 November 1984
Watford	4–1	West Bromwich Albion	20 November 1984

=== Replays ===
Home team	Result	Away team	Date
Queens Park Rangers	0–0	Southampton	27 November 1984
Tottenham Hotspur	1–2	Sunderland	5 December 1984
Queens Park Rangers	4–0	Southampton	12 December 1984

== Fifth round ==
The eight winners from the Fourth round took part in the Fifth round. This round was played over one leg.

=== Ties ===
Home team	Result	Away team	Date
Chelsea	1–1	Sheffield Wednesday	28 January 1985
Grimsby Town	0–1	Norwich City	16 January 1985
Ipswich Town	0–0	Queens Park Rangers	23 January 1985
Watford	0–1	Sunderland	23 January 1985

=== Replays ===
Home team	Result	Away team	Date
Queens Park Rangers	1–2	Ipswich Town	28 January 1985
Sheffield Wednesday	4–4	Chelsea	30 January 1985
Chelsea	2–1	Sheffield Wednesday	6 February 1985

== Semi-finals ==
As with the first two rounds, the semi-final ties were played over two legs. Relegation threatened East Anglian rivals Ipswich Town and Norwich City met in the first leg at Portman Road, where the Suffolk side won 1–0, only to be overhauled 2–0 at Carrow Road in the return match. Sunderland, also threatened by relegation, took on a thriving Chelsea side in the other semi-final, winning the first leg 2–0 and confirming their place in the final for the first time ever with a 3–2 win in the return match at Stamford Bridge.

=== First leg ===
13 February 1985

Sunderland	2 – 0	Chelsea
Colin West (2)

Roker Park
Attendance: 32,440
Referee: Don Shaw (Sandbach)
23 February 1985

Ipswich Town	1 – 0	Norwich City
Mich d'Avray

Portman Road
Attendance: 27,404
Referee: David Hutchinson (Harrogate)

=== Second leg ===
4 March 1985

Chelsea	2 – 3	Sunderland
David Speedie; Pat Nevin		Clive Walker (2); Colin West

Stamford Bridge
Attendance: c. 44,000
Referee: Allan Gunn (Burgess Hill)

Sunderland win 5–2 on aggregate

6 March 1985

Norwich City	2 – 0	Ipswich Town
John Deehan; Steve Bruce

Carrow Road
Attendance: 23,545
Referee: Keith Hackett (Sheffield)

Norwich win 2–1 on aggregate

== Final ==
24 March 1985

Norwich City	1–0	Sunderland
Chisholm 46' (o.g.)

Wembley Stadium, London
Attendance: 100,000
Referee: Neil Midgley (Manchester)
