= Ian Culverhouse =

English former professional footballer and manager

Personal information
- Full name: Ian Brett Culverhouse
- Date of birth: 22 September 1964 (age 62)
- Place of birth: Bishop's Stortford, England
- Height: 5 ft 10 in (1.78 m)
- Position: Defender

Senior career*
Years	Team	Apps	(Gls)
1982–1985	Tottenham Hotspur	2	(0)
1985–1994	Norwich City	297	(1)
1994–1998	Swindon Town	97	(0)
1998	Kingstonian	1	(0)
1998–2000	Brighton & Hove Albion	36	(0)
Total		433	(1)

International career
1982	England U17	4	(0)
1982	England Youth	2	(0)

Managerial career
- 2017–2018: King's Lynn Town
- 2018: Grantham Town
- 2018–2021: King's Lynn Town
- 2022: Kettering Town
- 2022–2024: Boston United
- 2024–2025: St Albans City
- 2025–2026: King's Lynn Town
- * Club domestic league appearances and goals

Ian Brett Culverhouse (born 22 September 1964) is an English former professional footballer and manager who played as a defender.

Culverhouse began his career with Tottenham Hotspur. He found first team opportunities limited there and made just two league appearances for the club, though he did get a winner's medal in the UEFA Cup as he was an unused substitute for Spurs in the 1984 final against Anderlecht.

In October 1985, Norwich City manager Ken Brown paid £50,000 for Culverhouse, who would go on to spend almost a decade at Carrow Road. At the time Culverhouse joined Norwich, they were in the Second Division and were favourites to win promotion back to the First Division. They duly did so, and Culverhouse ended his first season at Carrow Road with a Second Division championship medal. For a while it look as though he might add a First Division title medal the following season, as Norwich emerged as surprise title contenders, although they eventually had to settle to a fifth-place finish – the highest final position in the club's history at the time.

After injury during end of the 1986–87 season, Culverhouse found himself contesting a first team spot with the manager's son Kenny Brown at the start of the 1987–88 campaign. After Brown was replaced by Dave Stringer Culverhouse regained his first team place and attained a level of performance and consistency that made him a fixture in the starting eleven for the best part of a decade. He was part of some of the greatest moments in the club's history – the 1988–89 season that saw Norwich come close to winning the League and FA Cup double, the 1992–93 campaign when the Canaries finished third in the inaugural season of the FA Premier League, and the subsequent European campaign of 1993–94. Culverhouse acquitted himself well on the European stage, playing as a sweeper in a system introduced by manager Mike Walker for the European campaign, although he missed the away leg at Inter Milan's Giuseppe Miazza stadium – the match that saw City eliminated from the UEFA Cup – due to suspension, having picked up two yellow cards in the competition.

Culverhouse scored two goals for Norwich in his 369 appearances – one in a 1988 Full Members Cup match against Swindon Town, the other in a 1994 league match against Everton. His reliable performances in defence, however, led him to be a very popular figure with the club's supporters. In 1991, he was voted Norwich City player of the year and in 2002 – in a poll amongst supporters to mark the club's centenary – he was voted the best right-back ever to play for the club and made the 'all-time City XI'.

He was sold to Swindon Town for £150,000 in December 1994, having lost his regular place in the Carrow Road first team to new signing Carl Bradshaw at the start of the season.

Culverhouse is a member of the Norwich City F.C. Hall of Fame.

== Post-Norwich career ==
A contract dispute led to Culverhouse falling out of favour and being dropped from the first team during the 1994–95 season. He was sold to Swindon Town for £150,000, to the displeasure of many Norwich supporters. He was released by the Robins in 1998 and played briefly for Kingstonian and Brighton & Hove Albion. He began his coaching career while at Brighton where he coached the youth team. He has subsequently been youth team coach at Barnet, Leyton Orient and Wycombe Wanderers.

Culverhouse was named Colchester United assistant manager under Paul Lambert. Culverhouse, Lambert and 'football operations manager', Gary Karsa all resigned from Colchester to take up positions at Norwich City on 17 August 2009.

=== Aston Villa ===
On 5 July 2012, it was confirmed that Culverhouse and Gary Karsa would be joining Paul Lambert at Aston Villa, following him from Norwich City. Having been in charge of the majority of the training sessions at the club, he was dismissed in May 2014, following an internal investigation into off-field allegations. Having worked with Paul Lambert at Norwich City, Wycombe Wanderers, Colchester United and then Aston Villa, the duo were now separated.

=== Non-League ===
In 2017 Culverhouse was appointed manager of Southern League Premier Division club King's Lynn Town. He led the club to a second-place finish, after which they lost in the play-off final. He subsequently left King's Lynn, and was named manager of Grantham Town at the end of May 2018. However, after resigning as Grantham manager in October 2018, he returned to King's Lynn as manager on 1 November. Despite King's Lynn being in the bottom half of the Southern League Central Premier table when Culverhouse rejoined the club, form improved and the team climbed the table strongly in the second half of the season. They clinched the runners up spot on the final day of the season before winning the play-offs and Super play-offs to earn themselves a place in the National League North for the 2019/20 season.

Despite being relegation favourites and suffering a 3–0 defeat to Guiseley on the opening day of the season; Culverhouse and his team defied the odds and found themselves embroiled in a promotion battle with York City. When the season was suspended in March 2020 due to the COVID-19 outbreak; King's Lynn were in 2nd position, two points behind York but crucially had two games in hand. Following much deliberation by the National League and Football Association, the League was finally settled on a points-per-game calculation, crowning King's Lynn as champions and securing them and Culverhouse a second successive promotion.

On 23 January 2022, Culverhouse was appointed manager of National League North side Kettering Town. He left the club on 15 May 2022.

On 6 September 2022, Culverhouse was appointed manager of Boston United following the sacking of Paul Cox, the manager Culverhouse had replaced at Kettering Town. Having guided the club to promotion through the play-offs in the 2023–24 season, Culverhouse was sacked in October 2024 with the club sitting in 23rd position in the National League.

On 28 November 2024, Culverhouse was appointed manager of National League South side St Albans City. The season ended in disappointment for the Saints as they were relegated to the Isthmian League Premier Division after eleven years in the National League South.

On 28 October 2025, Culverhouse returned to National League North club King's Lynn Town for a third spell as manager.

== Honours ==
=== As a player ===
Tottenham Hotspur

- UEFA Cup: 1983–84

Swindon Town

- Football League Second Division: 1995–96

Individual

- PFA Team of the Year: 1995–96 Second Division

=== As a manager ===
King's Lynn Town

- Southern Football League Central Premier play-offs: 2019
- National League North: 2019–20

Boston United

- National League North play-offs: 2024
