= 1998–99 Blackburn Rovers F.C. season =

Blackburn Rovers F.C.
1998–99 season
- Owner: Jack Walker
- Chairman: Robert Coar
- Manager: Roy Hodgson (until 21 November); Brian Kidd (from 3 December)
- FA Premier League: 19th (relegated)
- FA Cup: Fifth round
- League Cup: Quarter-final
- UEFA Cup: First round
- Top goalscorer: Kevin Gallacher/Ashley Ward (5)
- Highest home attendance: 30,436 (vs. Manchester United, 12 May)
- Lowest home attendance: 13,646 (vs. Lyon, 15 September)
- Average home league attendance: 25,773

The 1998–99 season was Blackburn Rovers' seventh season in the FA Premier League, and their seventh consecutive season in the top division of English football.

== Season summary ==
Four years earlier, Blackburn Rovers were FA Premier League champions. Just one year earlier, they had qualified for the UEFA Cup. They were among some people's outsiders for a title challenge.

But it all went wrong for Rovers, who were soon in the depth of a relegation battle. Manager Roy Hodgson paid with his job in November. Manchester United assistant Brian Kidd was named as his replacement, but he was unable to steer Rovers to safety and their relegation was confirmed in the penultimate game of the season. They were condemned to a place in Division One, but managed to hold on to many key players and approached the new season as most people's favourites for an immediate return to the elite.

== Final league table ==
Pos	Team	Pld	W	D	L	GF	GA	GD	Pts	Qualification or relegation
16	Wimbledon	38	10	12	16	40	63	−23	42	
17	Southampton	38	11	8	19	37	64	−27	41	
18	Charlton Athletic (R)	38	8	12	18	41	56	−15	36	Relegation to Football League First Division
19	Blackburn Rovers (R)	38	7	14	17	38	52	−14	35	Relegation to Football League First Division
20	Nottingham Forest (R)	38	7	9	22	35	69	−34	30	Relegation to Football League First Division

Source: Premier League
Rules for classification: 1) points; 2) goal difference; 3) number of goals scored.
(R) Relegated

Results summary

Overall								Home						Away					
Pld	W	D	L	GF	GA	GD	Pts	W	D	L	GF	GA	GD	W	D	L	GF	GA	GD
38	7	14	17	38	52	−14	35	6	5	8	21	24	−3	1	9	9	17	28	−11

Source: 1998-99 FA Premier League table

Results by round

Round	1	2	3	4	5	6	7	8	9	10	11	12	13	14	15	16	17	18	19	20	21	22	23	24	25	26	27	28	29	30	31	32	33	34	35	36	37	38
Ground	H	A	H	A	A	H	A	H	A	H	A	H	A	H	A	H	H	A	H	A	H	A	H	A	A	H	A	H	A	H	H	A	A	H	A	H	H	A
Result	D	L	W	L	L	L	D	W	L	L	D	L	L	L	L	W	D	D	W	D	W	L	D	W	D	L	L	L	D	W	D	L	D	L	D	L	D	D
Position	6	16	11	14	18	18	18	17	17	17	17	18	18	20	20	18	18	18	16	16	16	16	17	15	16	17	18	18	18	17	16	17	18	17	18	19	19	19

Source: 11v11.com: 1998-99 Blackburn Rovers results
A = Away; H = Home; W = Win; D = Draw; L = Loss

== Results ==
Blackburn Rovers' score comes first

=== Legend ===
Win	Draw	Loss

=== FA Premier League ===
Date	Opponent	Venue	Result	Attendance	Scorers
15 August 1998	Derby County	H	0–0	24,007	
24 August 1998	Leeds United	A	0–1	30,652	
29 August 1998	Leicester City	H	1–0	22,544	Gallacher
9 September 1998	Tottenham Hotspur	A	1–2	28,338	Gallacher
12 September 1998	Sheffield Wednesday	A	0–3	20,846	
21 September 1998	Chelsea	H	3–4	23,113	Sutton (2, 1 pen), Pérez
26 September 1998	Everton	A	0–0	36,404	
3 October 1998	West Ham United	H	3–0	25,213	Flitcroft (2), Davidson
17 October 1998	Middlesbrough	A	1–2	34,413	Sherwood
25 October 1998	Arsenal	H	1–2	27,012	Johnson
31 October 1998	Wimbledon	A	1–1	12,526	Sutton (pen)
7 November 1998	Coventry City	H	1–2	23,779	Sherwood
14 November 1998	Manchester United	A	2–3	55,198	Marcolin, Blake
21 November 1998	Southampton	H	0–2	22,812	
29 November 1998	Liverpool	A	0–2	41,753	
5 December 1998	Charlton Athletic	H	1–0	22,568	Davies
12 December 1998	Newcastle United	H	0–0	27,569	
19 December 1998	Nottingham Forest	A	2–2	22,013	Blake (2)
26 December 1998	Aston Villa	H	2–1	27,536	Gallacher, Sherwood
28 December 1998	Leicester City	A	1–1	21,083	Gallacher
9 January 1999	Leeds United	H	1–0	27,620	Gillespie
16 January 1999	Derby County	A	0–1	27,386	
30 January 1999	Tottenham Hotspur	H	1–1	29,643	Jansen
6 February 1999	Aston Villa	A	3–1	37,404	Southgate (own goal), Ward, Dunn
17 February 1999	Chelsea	A	1–1	34,382	Ward
20 February 1999	Sheffield Wednesday	H	1–4	24,643	McAteer
27 February 1999	West Ham United	A	0–2	25,529	
10 March 1999	Everton	H	1–2	27,219	Ward
13 March 1999	Coventry City	A	1–1	19,701	Wilcox
20 March 1999	Wimbledon	H	3–1	21,754	Ward, Jansen (2)
3 April 1999	Middlesbrough	H	0–0	27,482	
6 April 1999	Arsenal	A	0–1	37,762	
17 April 1999	Southampton	A	3–3	15,209	Ward, Peacock, Wilcox
24 April 1999	Liverpool	H	1–3	29,944	Duff
1 May 1999	Charlton Athletic	A	0–0	20,041	
8 May 1999	Nottingham Forest	H	1–2	24,565	Gallacher
12 May 1999	Manchester United	H	0–0	30,436	
16 May 1999	Newcastle United	A	1–1	36,623	Wilcox

=== FA Cup ===
Round	Date	Opponent	Venue	Result	Attendance	Goalscorers
R3	2 January 1999	Charlton Athletic	H	2–0	16,631	Davies, Wilcox
R4	23 January 1999	Sunderland	H	1–0	30,125	Gillespie
R5	14 February 1999	Newcastle United	A	0–0	36,295	
R5R	24 February 1999	Newcastle United	H	0–1	27,483	

=== League Cup ===
Round	Date	Opponent	Venue	Result	Attendance	Goalscorers
R3	28 October 1998	Crewe Alexandra	A	1–0	5,403	Sutton
R4	11 November 1998	Newcastle United	A	1–1 (won 4–2 on pens)	34,702	Sherwood
QF	2 December 1998	Leicester City	A	0–1	19,442	

=== UEFA Cup ===
Round	Date	Opponent	Venue	Result	Attendance	Goalscorers	Referee
R1 1st leg	15 September 1998	Lyon	H	0–1	13,646 (1,300 away)		Knud Erik Fisker (Denmark)
R1 2nd leg	29 September 1998	Lyon	A	2–2 (lost 2–3 on agg)	24,558 (1,001 away)	Pérez, Flitcroft	René Temmink (Netherlands)

== First-team squad ==
Squad at end of season

Note: Flags indicate national team as defined under FIFA eligibility rules; some limited exceptions apply. Players may hold more than one non-FIFA nationality.

No.	Pos.	Nation	Player
1	GK	ENG	Tim Flowers
2	DF	IRL	Jeff Kenna
3	DF	SCO	Callum Davidson
5	DF	ENG	Darren Peacock
6	DF	SUI	Stéphane Henchoz
7	MF	ENG	Garry Flitcroft
8	FW	SCO	Kevin Gallacher
9	FW	ENG	Chris Sutton
10	FW	ENG	Kevin Davies
11	MF	ENG	Jason Wilcox (captain)
12	MF	IRL	Damien Duff
13	GK	AUS	John Filan
14	FW	WAL	Nathan Blake
15	MF	IRL	Lee Carsley
16	DF	ENG	Marlon Broomes
17	MF	SCO	Billy McKinlay

No.	Pos.	Nation	Player
18	MF	ITA	Dario Marcolin (on loan from Lazio)
19	MF	NIR	Damien Johnson
20	DF	ENG	Gary Croft
21	MF	ENG	Jimmy Corbett
22	GK	NIR	Alan Fettis
23	DF	SCO	Christian Dailly
24	MF	SUI	Oumar Kondé
26	FW	WAL	James Thomas
27	MF	ENG	David Dunn
28	DF	ENG	Martin Taylor
29	MF	ENG	Wayne Gill
30	GK	WAL	Anthony Williams
31	MF	NIR	Keith Gillespie
32	FW	ENG	Ashley Ward
33	FW	ENG	Matt Jansen
34	MF	IRL	Jason McAteer

=== Left club during season ===
Note: Flags indicate national team as defined under FIFA eligibility rules; some limited exceptions apply. Players may hold more than one non-FIFA nationality.

No.	Pos.	Nation	Player
4	MF	ENG	Tim Sherwood (captain, to Tottenham Hotspur)
14	FW	SWE	Martin Dahlin (retired)
15	MF	FRA	Sébastien Pérez (on loan to Bastia)
18	MF	SWE	Anders Andersson (to Aalborg)

No.	Pos.	Nation	Player
24	DF	NOR	Tore Pedersen (to Eintracht Frankfurt)
25	DF	IRL	David Worrell (to Dundee United)
—	MF	ENG	Luke Staton (to Bolton Wanderers)
—	DF	IRL	Graham Coughlan (to Livingston)

=== Reserve squad ===
Note: Flags indicate national team as defined under FIFA eligibility rules; some limited exceptions apply. Players may hold more than one non-FIFA nationality.

No.	Pos.	Nation	Player
—	GK	ENG	Gareth Stewart
—	DF	ENG	Keith Brown
—	DF	IRL	Peter Murphy

No.	Pos.	Nation	Player
—	MF	ENG	Ryan Baldacchino
—	MF	ENG	Ian Richards
—	MF	NIR	Steven Hawe

== Statistics ==
=== Appearances and goals ===
No.	Pos	Nat	Player	Total		FA Premier League		FA Cup		League Cup		UEFA Cup	
No.	Pos	Nat	Player	Apps	Goals	Apps	Goals	Apps	Goals	Apps	Goals	Apps	Goals
Goalkeepers
1	GK	(England) ENG	Tim Flowers	15	0	10+1	0	0+1	0	1	0	2	0
13	GK	(Australia) AUS	John Filan	32	0	26	0	4	0	2	0	0	0
22	GK	(Northern Ireland) NIR	Alan Fettis	2	0	2	0	0	0	0	0	0	0
Defenders
2	DF	(Republic of Ireland) IRL	Jeff Kenna	30	0	22+1	0	3	0	3	0	1	0
3	DF	(Scotland) SCO	Callum Davidson	41	1	34	1	2	0	2+1	0	1+1	0
5	DF	(England) ENG	Darren Peacock	37	1	27+3	1	3	0	2	0	2	0
6	DF	(Switzerland) SUI	Stéphane Henchoz	41	0	34	0	2	0	3	0	2	0
16	DF	(England) ENG	Marlon Broomes	17	0	8+5	0	4	0	0	0	0	0
20	DF	(England) ENG	Gary Croft	17	0	10+2	0	2+2	0	1	0	0	0
23	DF	(Scotland) SCO	Christian Dailly	21	0	14+3	0	0	0	2	0	2	0
24	DF	(Switzerland) SUI	Oumar Kondé	1	0	0	0	0+1	0	0	0	0	0
28	DF	(England) ENG	Martin Taylor	4	0	1+2	0	0	0	0	0	0+1	0
Midfielders
7	MF	(England) ENG	Garry Flitcroft	10	3	8	2	0	0	0	0	2	1
11	MF	(England) ENG	Jason Wilcox	35	4	28+2	3	3	1	0	0	2	0
12	MF	(Republic of Ireland) IRL	Damien Duff	36	1	18+10	1	3+1	0	3	0	1	0
15	MF	(Republic of Ireland) IRL	Lee Carsley	8	0	7+1	0	0	0	0	0	0	0
17	MF	(Scotland) SCO	Billy McKinlay	19	0	14+2	0	1	0	1	0	1	0
18	MF	(Italy) ITA	Dario Marcolin	15	1	5+5	1	3	0	2	0	0	0
19	MF	(Northern Ireland) NIR	Damien Johnson	25	1	14+7	1	0	0	3	0	0+1	0
27	MF	(England) ENG	David Dunn	20	1	10+5	1	2+1	0	1+1	0	0	0
31	MF	(Northern Ireland) NIR	Keith Gillespie	20	2	13+3	1	4	1	0	0	0	0
34	MF	(Republic of Ireland) IRL	Jason McAteer	13	1	13	1	0	0	0	0	0	0
Forwards
8	FW	(Scotland) SCO	Kevin Gallacher	18	5	13+3	5	1	0	1	0	0	0
9	FW	(England) ENG	Chris Sutton	20	4	17	3	1	0	1	1	1	0
10	FW	(England) ENG	Kevin Davies	27	2	9+12	1	2	1	3	0	1	0
14	FW	(Wales) WAL	Nathan Blake	14	3	9+2	3	1+2	0	0	0	0	0
32	FW	(England) ENG	Ashley Ward	20	5	17	5	2+1	0	0	0	0	0
33	FW	(England) ENG	Matt Jansen	11	3	10+1	3	0	0	0	0	0	0
Players transferred out during the season
4	MF	(England) ENG	Tim Sherwood	23	4	19	3	0	0	2	1	2	0
14	FW	(Sweden) SWE	Martin Dahlin	6	0	2+3	0	0	0	0	0	0+1	0
15	DF	(France) FRA	Sébastien Pérez	8	2	4+1	1	1	0	0	0	2	1

Last updated: 15 May 1999
Source: Competitions

=== Starting 11 ===
Considering starts in all competitions

- GK: #13, (Australia) John Filan, 32
- RB: #2, (Republic of Ireland) Jeff Kenna, 29
- CB: #5, (England) Darren Peacock, 34
- CB: #6, (Switzerland) Stéphane Henchoz, 41
- LB: #3, (Scotland) Callum Davidson, 39
- RM: #19, (Northern Ireland) Damien Johnson, 17 (#23, (Scotland) Christian Dailly, has 18 starts)
- CM: #4, (England) Tim Sherwood, 23
- CM: #11, (England) Jason Wilcox, 33
- LM: #12, (Republic of Ireland) Damien Duff, 25
- CF: #9, (England) Chris Sutton, 20
- CF: #32, (England) Ashley Ward, 19

=== Top scorers ===
- (England) Ashley Ward 5
- (Scotland) Kevin Gallacher 5
- (England) Chris Sutton 4
- (England) Jason Wilcox 4
- (England) Tim Sherwood 4
- (Wales) Nathan Blake 3

== Transfers ==
=== In ===
Date	Pos	Name	From	Fee
1 July 1998	DF	(England) Darren Peacock	(England) Newcastle United	Free
6 July 1998	FW	(England) Jimmy Corbett	(England) Gillingham	£535,00
9 July 1998	FW	(England) Kevin Davies	(England) Southampton	£7,250,000
21 July 1998	DF	(France) Sébastien Pérez	(France) SC Bastia	£3,000,000
21 August 1998	DF	(Scotland) Christian Dailly	(England) Derby County	£5,300,000
26 October 1998	MF	(Switzerland) Oumar Kondé	(Switzerland) FC Basel	£500,000
30 October 1998	FW	(Wales) Nathan Blake	(England) Bolton Wanderers	£4,250,000
16 December 1998	MF	(Northern Ireland) Keith Gillespie	(England) Newcastle United	£2,350,000
29 December 1998	FW	(England) Ashley Ward	(England) Barnsley	£4,500,000
18 January 1999	FW	(England) Matt Jansen	(England) Crystal Palace	£4,100,000
27 January 1999	MF	(Republic of Ireland) Jason McAteer	(England) Liverpool	£4,000,000
12 February 1999	DF	(Scotland) David McNamee	(Scotland) St Mirren	£300,000
12 February 1999	MF	(South Africa) Burton O'Brien	(Scotland) St Mirren	£300,000
22 March 1999	MF	(Republic of Ireland) Lee Carsley	(England) Derby County	£3,400,000

=== Out ===
Date	Pos.	Name	To	Fee
1 August 1998	MF	(England) Michael Lomax	(England) Macclesfield Town	Free
1 August 1998	FW	(Denmark) Per Pedersen	(France) Strasbourg	£900,000
4 August 1998	DF	(Scotland) Colin Hendry	(Scotland) Rangers	£4,000,000
26 October 1998	DF	(Norway) Tore Pedersen	(Germany) Eintracht Frankfurt	£225,000
5 January 1999	MF	(England) Luke Staton	(England) Bolton Wanderers	Free
4 February 1999	MF	(England) Tim Sherwood	(England) Tottenham Hotspur	£4,000,000
30 March 1999	DF	(Republic of Ireland) David Worrell	(Scotland) Dundee United	£50,000
31 May 1999	DF	(Republic of Ireland) Graham Coughlan	(Scotland) Livingston	Free
1 June 1999	DF	(France) Sébastien Pérez	(France) Marseille	£2,500,000

Transfers in: ▼£39,250,000
Transfers out: ▲£11,675,000
Total spending: ▼£27,750,000
