= 1997–98 Blackburn Rovers F.C. season =

Blackburn Rovers F.C.
1997–98 season
- Owner: Jack Walker
- Chairman: Robert Coar
- Manager: Roy Hodgson
- Stadium: Ewood Park
- FA Premier League: 6th
- FA Cup: Fifth round
- League Cup: Third round
- Top goalscorer: League: Chris Sutton (18); All: Chris Sutton (21)
- Highest home attendance: 30,547 vs Manchester United (6 April 1998, FA Premier League)
- Lowest home attendance: 19,086 vs Coventry City (28 September 1997, FA Premier League)
- Average home league attendance: 25,253

During the 1997–98 English football season, Blackburn Rovers competed in the FA Premier League.

== Season summary ==
After last season's slip-up, Blackburn Rovers emerged as title contenders under new manager Roy Hodgson, and even sixth place in the final table was enough for a UEFA Cup place. Never below seventh throughout the campaign, Rovers only lost two league matches before New Year as Hodgson picked up the Premier League Manager of the Month awards for both August and December, but faded in the second half of the campaign.

Chris Sutton's continued return to form saw him come joint top of the FA Premier League goalscoring charts with 18 goals, a Premier League Player of the Month award for February and led to him earning a long-awaited international call-up, though he didn't make the final squad for the World Cup after refusing to play for the England B team.

== Final league table ==
Pos	Team	Pld	W	D	L	GF	GA	GD	Pts	Qualification or relegation
4	Chelsea	38	20	3	15	71	43	+28	63	Qualification for the Cup Winners' Cup first round (Note: Chelsea qualified for the Cup Winners' Cup as defending champions. As they were also the League Cup winners, the UEFA Cup berth vacated was awarded to Blackburn Rovers.)
5	Leeds United	38	17	8	13	57	46	+11	59	Qualification for the UEFA Cup first round (Note: Aston Villa was rewarded entry to the UEFA Cup through UEFA Fair Play ranking.)
6	Blackburn Rovers	38	16	10	12	57	52	+5	58	Qualification for the UEFA Cup first round
7	Aston Villa	38	17	6	15	49	48	+1	57	Qualification for the UEFA Cup first round
8	West Ham United	38	16	8	14	56	57	−1	56	

Source: Premier League
Rules for classification: 1) points; 2) goal difference; 3) number of goals scored.
Notes:

Results summary

Overall								Home						Away					
Pld	W	D	L	GF	GA	GD	Pts	W	D	L	GF	GA	GD	W	D	L	GF	GA	GD
38	16	10	12	57	52	+5	58	11	4	4	40	26	+14	5	6	8	17	26	−9

Source: 1997-98 FA Premier League table

Results by round

Round	1	2	3	4	5	6	7	8	9	10	11	12	13	14	15	16	17	18	19	20	21	22	23	24	25	26	27	28	29	30	31	32	33	34	35	36	37	38
Ground	H	A	H	H	A	H	A	A	H	A	H	A	A	H	H	A	H	A	H	A	H	A	H	A	H	A	H	A	A	H	H	A	H	A	H	A	A	H
Result	W	W	D	W	W	L	D	D	D	W	W	D	D	W	W	L	W	W	W	D	D	L	W	D	L	L	W	L	L	W	L	L	L	L	D	W	L	W
Position	5	1	1	1	1	2	2	3	5	3	2	3	3	2	2	3	3	2	2	2	2	3	2	3	4	5	2	5	5	4	6	6	6	7	6	6	6	6

Source: 11v11.com: 1997-98 Blackburn Rovers results
A = Away; H = Home; W = Win; D = Draw; L = Loss

== Results ==
Blackburn Rovers' score comes first

=== Legend ===
Win	Draw	Loss

=== FA Premier League ===
Date	Opponent	Venue	Result	Attendance	Scorers
9 August 1997	Derby County	H	1–0	23,557	Gallacher
13 August 1997	Aston Villa	A	4–0	37,112	Sutton (3), Gallacher
23 August 1997	Liverpool	H	1–1	30,187	Dahlin
25 August 1997	Sheffield Wednesday	H	7–2	19,618	Gallacher (2), Hyde (own goal), Wilcox, Sutton (2), Bohinen
30 August 1997	Crystal Palace	A	2–1	20,849	Sutton, Gallacher
14 September 1997	Leeds United	H	3–4	21,956	Gallacher, Sutton (pen), Dahlin
20 September 1997	Tottenham Hotspur	A	0–0	26,573	
24 September 1997	Leicester City	A	1–1	19,921	Sutton
28 September 1997	Coventry City	H	0–0	19,086	
4 October 1997	Wimbledon	A	1–0	15,600	Sutton
18 October 1997	Southampton	H	1–0	24,130	Sherwood
25 October 1997	Newcastle United	A	1–1	36,716	Sutton
1 November 1997	Barnsley	A	1–1	18,665	Sherwood
8 November 1997	Everton	H	3–2	25,397	Gallacher, Duff, Sherwood
22 November 1997	Chelsea	H	1–0	27,683	Croft
30 November 1997	Manchester United	A	0–4	55,175	
6 December 1997	Bolton Wanderers	H	3–1	25,503	Gallacher, Sutton, Wilcox
13 December 1997	Arsenal	A	3–1	38,147	Wilcox, Gallacher, Sherwood
20 December 1997	West Ham United	H	3–0	21,653	Ripley, Duff (2)
26 December 1997	Sheffield Wednesday	A	0–0	33,502	
28 December 1997	Crystal Palace	H	2–2	23,872	Gallacher, Sutton
11 January 1998	Derby County	A	1–3	27,823	Sutton
17 January 1998	Aston Villa	H	5–0	24,834	Sherwood, Gallacher (3), Ripley
31 January 1998	Liverpool	A	0–0	43,890	
7 February 1998	Tottenham Hotspur	H	0–3	30,388	
21 February 1998	Southampton	A	0–3	15,162	
28 February 1998	Leicester City	H	5–3	24,854	Dahlin, Sutton (3), Hendry
11 March 1998	Leeds United	A	0–4	32,933	
14 March 1998	Everton	A	0–1	33,423	
31 March 1998	Barnsley	H	2–1	24,179	Dahlin, Gallacher
6 April 1998	Manchester United	H	1–3	30,547	Sutton (pen)
11 April 1998	Bolton Wanderers	A	1–2	25,000	Duff
13 April 1998	Arsenal	H	1–4	28,212	Gallacher
18 April 1998	West Ham United	A	1–2	24,733	Wilcox
25 April 1998	Wimbledon	H	0–0	24,848	
29 April 1998	Chelsea	A	1–0	33,311	Gallacher
2 May 1998	Coventry City	A	0–2	18,794	
10 May 1998	Newcastle United	H	1–0	29,300	Sutton

=== FA Cup ===
Round	Date	Opponent	Venue	Result	Attendance	Goalscorers
R3	3 January 1998	Wigan Athletic	H	4–2	22,402	McGibbon (own goal), Gallacher (2), Sherwood
R4	26 January 1998	Sheffield Wednesday	A	3–0	15,940	Sutton, Sherwood, Duff
R5	14 February 1998	West Ham United	A	2–2	25,729	Gallacher, Sutton
R5R	25 February 1998	West Ham United	H	1–1 (lost 4–5 on pens)	21,972	Ripley

=== League Cup ===
Round	Date	Opponent	Venue	Result	Attendance	Goalscorers
R2 1st Leg	17 September 1997	Preston North End	H	6–0	22,564	Dahlin (2), Sutton, Gallacher, Andersson, Bohinen
R2 2nd Leg	30 September 1997	Preston North End	A	0–1 (won 6–1 on agg)	11,472	
R3	15 October 1997	Chelsea	A	1–1 (lost 1–4 on pens)	18,671	McKinlay

== Squad ==
Note: Flags indicate national team as defined under FIFA eligibility rules; some limited exceptions apply. Players may hold more than one non-FIFA nationality.

No.	Pos.	Nation	Player
1	GK	ENG	Tim Flowers
2	DF	SCO	Callum Davidson
3	DF	IRL	Jeff Kenna
4	MF	ENG	Tim Sherwood (captain)
5	DF	SCO	Colin Hendry
6	DF	NOR	Tore Pedersen
7	MF	ENG	Stuart Ripley
8	FW	SCO	Kevin Gallacher
9	FW	ENG	Chris Sutton
10	FW	SWE	Martin Dahlin
11	MF	ENG	Jason Wilcox
13	GK	AUS	John Filan
14	FW	SWE	Anders Andersson
15	MF	ENG	Garry Flitcroft

No.	Pos.	Nation	Player
16	FW	DEN	Per Pedersen
17	MF	SCO	Billy McKinlay
20	DF	ENG	Gary Croft
22	DF	FRA	Patrick Valéry
24	DF	SUI	Stéphane Henchoz
25	MF	IRL	Damien Duff
26	DF	ENG	Marlon Broomes
32	GK	WAL	Anthony Williams
33	GK	NIR	Alan Fettis
34	FW	ENG	James Beattie
35	MF	NIR	Damien Johnson
36	MF	ENG	Wayne Gill
37	DF	ENG	Adam Reed

=== Left club during season ===
Note: Flags indicate national team as defined under FIFA eligibility rules; some limited exceptions apply. Players may hold more than one non-FIFA nationality.

No.	Pos.	Nation	Player
12	MF	NOR	Lars Bohinen (to Derby County)
18	DF	ENG	Ian Pearce (to West Ham United)

No.	Pos.	Nation	Player
19	DF	WAL	Chris Coleman (to Fulham)
21	MF	GRE	Georgios Donis (to AEK Athens)

== Transfers ==
=== In ===
Date	Pos	Name	From	Fee
17 June 1997	DF	Stéphane Henchoz	HSV	£3,000,000
24 June 1997	DF	Patrick Valéry	Bastia	Free transfer
8 July 1997	FW	Martin Dahlin	Roma	£2,500,000
8 July 1997	FW	Anders Andersson	Malmö FF	£500,000
1 August 1997	GK	John Filan	Coventry City	£700,000
8 September 1997	DF	Tore Pedersen	FC St. Pauli	£500,000
10 September 1997	GK	Alan Fettis	Nottingham Forest	£300,000
10 February 1998	DF	Callum Davidson	St Johnstone	£1,750,000
21 May 1998	MF	Jimmy Corbett	Gillingham	£525,000

=== Out ===
Date	Pos	Name	To	Fee
21 July 1997	MF	Matty Holmes	Charlton Athletic	£250,000
1 August 1997	MF	Graham Fenton	Leicester City	£1,100,000
1 August 1997	DF	Nicky Marker	Sheffield United	Signed
1 August 1997	DF	Paul Warhurst	Crystal Palace	Signed
8 August 1997	DF	Graeme Le Saux	Chelsea	£7,000,000
11 August 1997	DF	Henning Berg	Manchester United	£5,000,000
18 September 1997	DF	Ian Pearce	West Ham United	£2,300,000
22 September 1997	MF	Georgios Donis	AEK Athens	Free transfer
1 December 1997	DF	Chris Coleman	Fulham	£2,000,000
25 March 1998	MF	Lars Bohinen	Derby County	£1,450,000

Transfers in: ▼£9,775,000
Transfers out: ▲£19,100,000
Total spending: ▲£9,325,000

== Statistics ==
=== Starting 11 ===
Considering starts in all competitions

- GK: #1, (England) Tim Flowers, 30
- RB: #3, (Republic of Ireland) Jeff Kenna, 42
- CB: #5, (Scotland) Colin Hendry, 39
- CB: #24, (Switzerland) Stéphane Henchoz, 40
- LB: #20, (England) Gary Croft, 24 (#11, (England) Jason Wilcox, has 27 starts)
- RM: #7, (England) Stuart Ripley, 28
- CM: #17, (Scotland) Billy McKinlay, 31
- CM: #4, (England) Tim Sherwood, 34
- LM: #15, (England) Garry Flitcroft, 31
- CF: #8, (Scotland) Kevin Gallacher, 35
- CF: #9, (England) Chris Sutton, 41
