= Martin Dahlin =

Swedish footballer (born 1968)

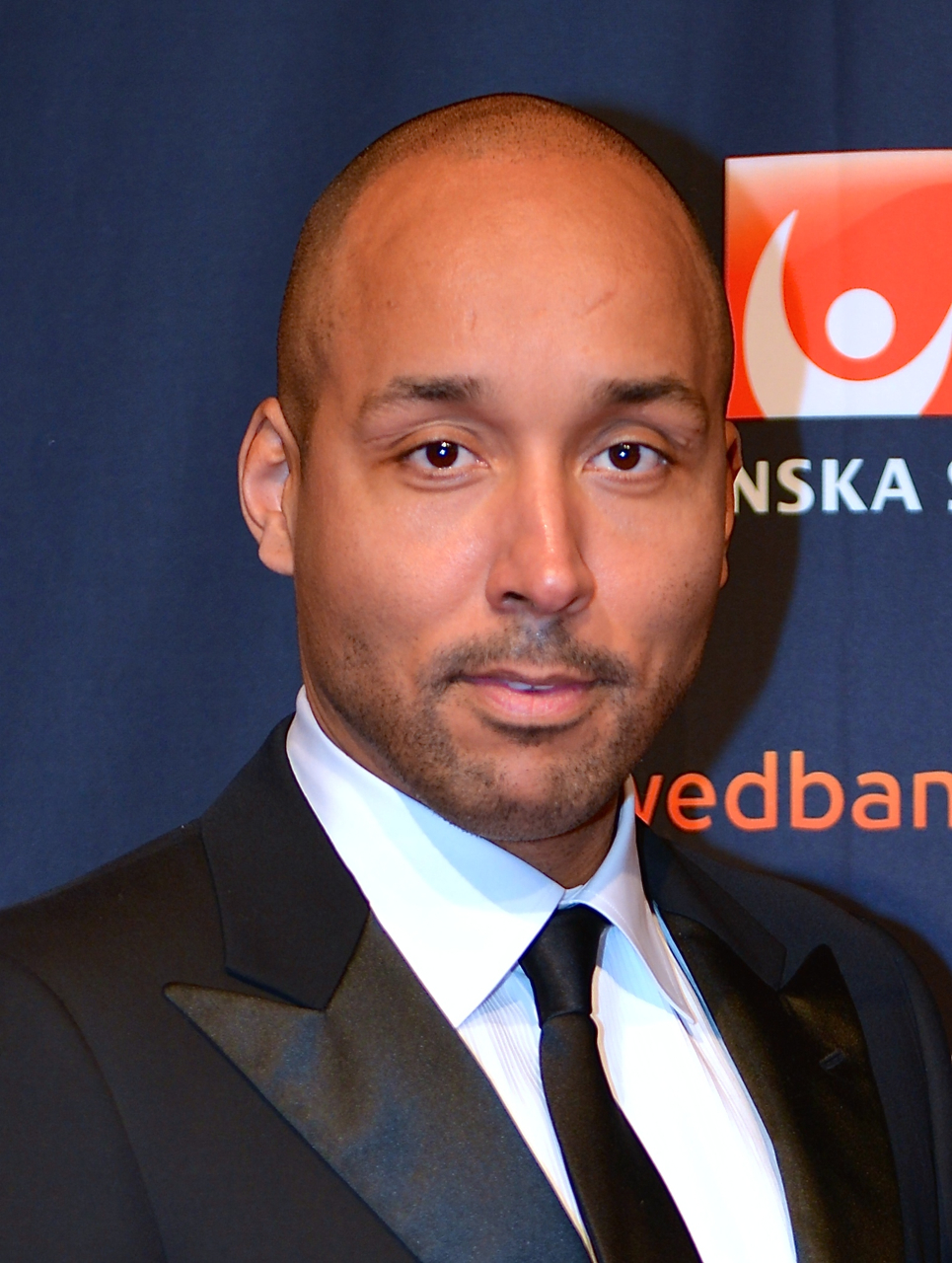
- Dahlin at the Swedish Sports Awards 2014

Personal information
- Full name: Dan Martin Nataniel Dahlin
- Date of birth: 16 April 1968 (age 58)
- Place of birth: Höganäs, Sweden
- Height: 1.84 m (6 ft 0 in)
- Position: Striker

Youth career
- Lunds BK

Senior career*
Years	Team	Apps	(Gls)
1987–1991	Malmö FF	79	(39)
1991–1996	Borussia Mönchengladbach	106	(50)
1996–1997	Roma	3	(0)
1996–1997	→ Borussia Mönchengladbach (loan)	19	(10)
1997–1999	Blackburn Rovers	26	(4)
1998–1999	→ Hamburger SV (loan)	8	(0)
Total		241	(103)

International career
1985–1986	Sweden U18	7	(2)
1988	Sweden U21	2	(0)
1988	Sweden Olympic	6	(0)
1991–1997	Sweden	60	(29)
Medal record
Sweden
FIFA World Cup
Bronze medal – third place	1994
- * Club domestic league appearances and goals

Dan Martin Nataniel Dahlin (Swedish pronunciation: [ˈmar.tɪn daˈliːn]; born 16 April 1968) is a Swedish former professional footballer who played as a striker. In his prime, he was considered one of the world's best strikers.

Starting off his career with Malmö FF in 1987, he was the 1988 Allsvenskan top scorer and played for clubs in the Bundesliga, Serie A, and the Premier League before retiring in 1999.

A full international between 1991 and 1997, he won 60 caps for the Sweden national team and was in the Sweden national team that placed third in the 1994 FIFA World Cup. He also represented Sweden at the 1988 Summer Olympics and UEFA Euro 1992. In 1993, he was bestowed the Guldbollen as Sweden's best footballer of the year.

== Early life ==
Dahlin was born in Höganäs, Sweden to a Venezuelan father, who was a musician, and a Swedish mother. Named after Martin Luther King Jr., Dahlin spent his upbringing in Lund.

== Club career ==
In 1993, he was selected as best Swedish player of the year, winning Guldbollen.

He played for Malmö FF, Borussia Mönchengladbach, A.S. Roma, Hamburger SV and Blackburn Rovers. The most successful time of his career he spent with Borussia Mönchengladbach with whom he won the German Cup in 1995 along with Stefan Effenberg.

Dahlin transferred from Roma to Blackburn Rovers in mid-1997 and made 21 appearances in the 1997–98 season, scoring four goals.

In the 1998–99 season, he only played five games when an injury in a training game ruled him out for the rest of the season and contributed to his retirement from the game after a short spell at Hamburger SV in 1999.

Blackburn Rovers later sued their insurance company who had refused to pay out over the injury claiming that normal wear and tear could have been a contributing factor. Although the initial verdict was given in favour of the club, in 2005 the Court of Appeal overturned the verdict and sent it back to the lower court. On 12 April 2006, the High Court ruled in favour of the insurance company, decreeing that the player probably had a pre-existing condition. This decision left Blackburn about £4 million out-of-pocket.

== International career ==
Dahlin earned 66 caps for the Sweden men's national team. He was in the Sweden men's national team that finished third in the 1994 FIFA World Cup, scoring four goals in the tournament. He also was in the team that reached the semifinals of UEFA Euro 1992.

== Retirement ==
Dahlin legally lives in Monaco. He lends his name to a clothing line. He speaks three languages – Swedish, English and German.

Dahlin became a sports agent working for former teammate Roger Ljung's sport agency Roger Ljung Promotion AB. He has since formed his own agency called MD Management. He represents Ola Toivonen, Guillermo Molins, Markus Rosenberg, Jonas Olsson, Behrang Safari and Pontus Jansson.

== Career statistics ==
=== Club ===
Appearances and goals by club, season and competition
Club	Season	League			National Cup		League Cup		Continental		Other		Total	
Club	Season	Division	Apps	Goals	Apps	Goals	Apps	Goals	Apps	Goals	Apps	Goals	Apps	Goals
Malmö FF	1988	Allsvenskan	21	17			–						21	17
Malmö FF	1989	Allsvenskan	17	4			–						17	4
Malmö FF	1990	Allsvenskan	19	7			–						19	7
Malmö FF	1991	Allsvenskan	22	11			–						22	11
Malmö FF	Total		79	39			0	0					79	39
Borussia Mönchengladbach	1991–92	Bundesliga	12	2	2	0	–		0	0	–		14	2
Borussia Mönchengladbach	1992–93	Bundesliga	20	10	3	1	–		0	0	–		23	11
Borussia Mönchengladbach	1993–94	Bundesliga	27	12	4	2	–		0	0	–		31	14
Borussia Mönchengladbach	1994–95	Bundesliga	24	11	5	2	–		0	0	–		29	13
Borussia Mönchengladbach	1995–96	Bundesliga	23	15	1	0	–		5	3	1 (Note: Appearance in German Super Cup)	0	30	18
Borussia Mönchengladbach	Total		106	50	15	5	0	0	5	3	1	0	127	58
Roma	1996–97	Serie A	3	0	1	0	–		0	0	–		4	0
Borussia Mönchengladbach (loan)	1996–97	Bundesliga	19	10	0	0	–		0	0	–		19	10
Blackburn Rovers	1997–98	Premier League	21	4	1	0	2	2	0	0	–		24	6
Blackburn Rovers	1998–99	Premier League	5	0	0	0	0	0	1	0	–		6	0
Hamburger SV (loan)	1998–99	Bundesliga	8	0	0	0	–		0	0	–		8	0
Career total			241	103	17	5	2	2	6	3	1	0	267	113

=== International ===
Appearances and goals by national team and year

National team	Season	Apps	Goals
Sweden
Sweden	1991	7	6
Sweden	1992	10	4
Sweden	1993	8	6
Sweden	1994	12	6
Sweden	1995	6	0
Sweden	1996	8	5
Sweden	1997	9	2
Total		60	29

International goals

Scores and results list Sweden's goal tally first.

#	Date	Venue	Opponent	Score	Result	Competition
1.	1 May 1991	Råsunda Stadium, Solna, Sweden	Austria	4–0	6–0	Friendly
2.	1 May 1991	Råsunda Stadium, Solna, Sweden	Austria	5–0	6–0	Friendly
3.	15 June 1991	Idrottsparken, Norrköping	Denmark	1–0	4–0	Scania 100 Tournament
4.	15 June 1991	Idrottsparken, Norrköping	Denmark	2–0	4–0	Scania 100 Tournament
5.	4 September 1991	Råsunda Stadium, Solna, Sweden	Yugoslavia	1–0	4–3	Friendly
6.	4 September 1991	Råsunda Stadium, Solna, Sweden	Yugoslavia	3–2	4–3	Friendly
7.	7 May 1992	Råsunda Stadium, Solna, Sweden	Poland	4–0	5–0	Friendly
8.	26 August 1992	Ullevaal Stadion, Oslo, Norway	Norway	1–1	2–2	Friendly
9.	7 October 1992	Råsunda Stadium, Solna, Sweden	Bulgaria	1–0	2–0	1994 FIFA World Cup qualifier
10.	11 November 1992	Ramat Gan Stadium, Ramat Gan, Israel	Israel	2–1	3–1	1994 FIFA World Cup qualifier
11.	28 April 1993	Parc des Princes, Paris, France	France	1–0	1–2	1994 FIFA World Cup qualifier
12.	11 August 1993	Ryavallen, Borås, Sweden	Switzerland	1–0	1–2	Friendly
13.	22 August 1993	Råsunda Stadium, Solna, Sweden	France	1–1	1–1	1994 FIFA World Cup qualifier
14.	8 September 1993	Vasil Levski National Stadium, Sofia, Bulgaria	Bulgaria	1–1	1–1	1994 FIFA World Cup qualifier
15.	13 October 1993	Råsunda Stadium, Solna, Sweden	Finland	1–1	3–2	1994 FIFA World Cup qualifier
16.	13 October 1993	Råsunda Stadium, Solna, Sweden	Finland	3–1	3–2	1994 FIFA World Cup qualifier
17.	19 June 1994	Rose Bowl, Pasadena, California, US	Cameroon	2–2	2–2	1994 FIFA World Cup
18.	24 June 1994	Pontiac Silverdome, Pontiac, Michigan, US	Russia	2–1	3–1	1994 FIFA World Cup
19.	24 June 1994	Pontiac Silverdome, Pontiac, Michigan, US	Russia	3–1	3–1	1994 FIFA World Cup
20.	3 July 1994	Cotton Bowl, Dallas, Texas, US	Saudi Arabia	1–0	3–1	1994 FIFA World Cup
21.	12 October 1994	Wankdorf Stadium, Bern, Switzerland	Switzerland	2–1	2–4	UEFA Euro 1996 qualifier
22.	16 November 1994	Råsunda Stadium, Solna, Sweden	Hungary	2–0	2–0	UEFA Euro 1996 qualifier
23.	24 April 1996	Windsor Park, Belfast, Northern Ireland	Northern Ireland	1–0	2–1	Friendly
24.	9 May 1996	Olympia, Helsingborg, Sweden	Slovakia	1–0	2–1	Friendly
25.	16 May 1996	Olympic Stadium, Seoul, South Korea	South Korea	1–0	2–0	Friendly
26.	1 June 1996	Råsunda Stadium, Solna, Sweden	Belarus	2–0	5–1	1998 FIFA World Cup qualifier
27.	1 September 1996	Daugava Stadium, Riga, Latvia	Latvia	1–0	2–1	1998 FIFA World Cup qualifier
28.	8 June 1997	Kadriorg Stadium, Tallinn, Estonia	Estonia	1–0	3–2	1998 FIFA World Cup qualifier
29.	6 August 1997	Malmö Stadion, Malmö, Sweden	Lithuania	1–0	1–0	Friendly

== Honours ==
Malmö FF

- Swedish Champion: 1988
- Allsvenskan: 1988, 1989
- Svenska Cupen: 1988–89

Borussia Mönchengladbach

- DFB-Pokal: 1994–95

Sweden

- FIFA World Cup third place: 1994

Individual

- Allsvenskan top scorer: 1988
- Guldbollen: 1993
- kicker Bundesliga Team of the Season: 1995–96
