= 1993–94 Norwich City F.C. season =

Norwich City
1993–94 season
- Chairman: Robert Chase
- Manager: Mike Walker (until 6 January); John Deehan (from 12 January)
- Stadium: Carrow Road
- FA Premier League: 12th
- FA Cup: Fourth round
- League Cup: Third round
- UEFA Cup: Third round
- Top goalscorer: League: Sutton (25); All: Sutton (28)
- Average home league attendance: 18,164

During the 1993–94 English football season, Norwich City F.C. competed in the Premier League.

== Season summary ==
Norwich City's achievements in 1992–93 were outstanding - a club-best third-place finish and their first ever European place, all of this achieved with a relatively tight transfer budget and one of the Premiership's smaller fan bases.

Manager Mike Walker's achievements were far from over as the campaign began. They were close behind runaway leaders Manchester United in the title race, but most impressively eliminated Bayern Munich from the UEFA Cup in the second round; in doing so, they became the only English side to beat Bayern on their own soil. The dream came to an end in the third round as the Canaries were eliminated by Inter Milan.

Walker quit the club in January to take over at Everton, and his assistant John Deehan took over. At this point Norwich were 7th and had at least one game in hand on most of their fellow contenders for European qualification. However, Deehan was unable to keep up the momentum and Norwich slumped to 12th place in the final table, the decline accelerated by a 10-match winless run which was the longest of any Premier League club during the season with the exception of Swindon's 16-match winless start. The record-breaking sale of young striker Chris Sutton to Blackburn Rovers left Norwich with a big hole to fill in their attack, and the only major signing of the close season was midfielder Mike Milligan from Oldham Athletic.

== Final league table ==
Pos	Team	Pld	W	D	L	GF	GA	GD	Pts	Qualification or relegation
10	Aston Villa	42	15	12	15	46	50	−4	57	Qualification for the UEFA Cup first round (Note: Aston Villa qualified for the UEFA Cup as League Cup winners.)
11	Coventry City	42	14	14	14	43	45	−2	56	
12	Norwich City	42	12	17	13	65	61	+4	53	
13	West Ham United	42	13	13	16	47	58	−11	52	
14	Chelsea	42	13	12	17	49	53	−4	51	Qualification for the Cup Winners' Cup first round (Note: Chelsea qualified for the Cup Winners' Cup as FA Cup runners-up, as winners Manchester United qualified for the Champions League.)

Source: Premier League
Rules for classification: 1) points; 2) goal difference; 3) number of goals scored.

== Results ==
Norwich City's score comes first

=== Legend ===
Win	Draw	Loss

=== FA Premier League ===
Date	Opponent	Venue	Result	Attendance	Scorers
15 August 1993	Manchester United	H	0–2	19,705	
18 August 1993	Blackburn Rovers	A	3–2	14,236	Sutton (2), Newman
21 August 1993	Leeds United	A	4–0	32,008	Fox (2), Goss, Sutton
25 August 1993	Ipswich Town	H	1–0	19,189	Goss
28 August 1993	Swindon Town	H	0–0	17,614	
1 September 1993	Sheffield Wednesday	A	3–3	25,175	Sutton, Bowen, Ekoku
11 September 1993	Wimbledon	H	0–1	14,851	
18 September 1993	Queens Park Rangers	A	2–2	13,359	Eadie, McDonald (own goal)
25 September 1993	Everton	A	5–1	20,531	Ekoku (4), Sutton
2 October 1993	Coventry City	H	1–0	16,239	Fox
16 October 1993	Chelsea	A	2–1	16,923	Fox, Sutton
23 October 1993	West Ham United	H	0–0	20,211	
30 October 1993	Arsenal	A	0–0	30,516	
6 November 1993	Sheffield United	A	2–1	18,254	Goss, Eadie
20 November 1993	Manchester City	H	1–1	16,626	Fox
27 November 1993	Oldham Athletic	A	1–2	10,198	Sutton
4 December 1993	Manchester United	A	2–2	44,694	Fox (pen), Sutton
13 December 1993	Leeds United	H	2–1	16,586	Sutton, Ekoku
18 December 1993	Ipswich Town	A	1–2	19,498	Bowen
27 December 1993	Tottenham Hotspur	A	3–1	33,130	Sutton (2), Ekoku
29 December 1993	Aston Villa	H	1–2	20,650	Sutton
1 January 1994	Southampton	A	1–0	16,556	Sutton
4 January 1994	Newcastle United	H	1–2	19,564	Bowen
15 January 1994	Chelsea	H	1–1	19,472	Ekoku
24 January 1994	West Ham United	A	3–3	20,738	Sutton (2), Fox
5 February 1994	Liverpool	H	2–2	19,746	Sutton (2)
13 February 1994	Arsenal	H	1–1	17,667	Ekoku
19 February 1994	Swindon Town	A	3–3	15,405	Goss, Sutton, Newman
22 February 1994	Blackburn Rovers	H	2–2	15,193	Sutton (2, 1 pen)
26 February 1994	Sheffield Wednesday	H	1–1	18,311	Sutton
5 March 1994	Wimbledon	A	1–3	7,206	Ekoku
12 March 1994	Queens Park Rangers	H	3–4	16,499	Ekoku (2), Bowen
21 March 1994	Everton	H	3–0	16,432	Culverhouse, Sutton, Bowen
26 March 1994	Coventry City	A	1–2	13,514	Eadie
29 March 1994	Newcastle United	A	0–3	32,216	
2 April 1994	Tottenham Hotspur	H	1–2	21,181	Sutton
4 April 1994	Aston Villa	A	0–0	25,416	
9 April 1994	Southampton	H	4–5	17,150	Goss, Sutton (2), Robins
16 April 1994	Manchester City	A	1–1	28,010	Ullathorne
23 April 1994	Sheffield United	H	0–1	18,474	
30 April 1994	Liverpool	A	1–0	44,339	Goss
7 May 1994	Oldham Athletic	H	1–1	20,394	Ullathorne

=== FA Cup ===
Round	Date	Opponent	Venue	Result	Attendance	Goalscorers
R3	8 January 1994	Wycombe Wanderers	A	2–0	7,802	Sutton (2)
R4	30 January 1994	Manchester United	H	0–2	21,060	

=== League Cup ===
Round	Date	Opponent	Venue	Result	Attendance	Goalscorers
R2 1st leg	22 September 1993	Bradford City	A	1–2	8,988	Fox
R2 2nd leg	6 October 1993	Bradford City	H	3–0 (won 4–2 on agg)	12,787	Ekoku, Fox, Sutton
R3	26 October 1993	Arsenal	A	1–1	24,539	Crook
R3R	10 November 1993	Arsenal	H	0–3	16,319	

=== UEFA Cup ===
Round	Date	Opponent	Venue	Result	Attendance	Goalscorers	Referee
R1 1st leg	15 September 1993	Vitesse Arnhem	H	3–0	16,818	Ekoku, Goss, Polston	Robert Sedlacek (Austria)
R1 2nd leg	29 September 1993	Vitesse Arnhem	A	0–0 (won 3–0 on agg)	9,133		Theodoros Kefalas (Greece)
R2 1st leg	20 October 1993	Bayern Munich	A	2–1	28,500	Goss, Bowen	
R2 2nd leg	3 November 1993	Bayern Munich	H	1–1 (won 3–2 on agg)	20,643	Goss	
R3 1st leg	24 November 1993	Internazionale Milano	H	0–1	20,805		
R3 2nd leg	8 December 1993	Internazionale Milano	A	0–1 (lost 0–2 on agg)	30,000		

== Players ==
=== First-team squad ===
Squad at end of season

Note: Flags indicate national team as defined under FIFA eligibility rules; some limited exceptions apply. Players may hold more than one non-FIFA nationality.

No.	Pos.	Nation	Player
1	GK	SCO	Bryan Gunn
2	DF	WAL	Mark Bowen
3	DF	ENG	Rob Newman
4	MF	ENG	Ian Crook
5	DF	ENG	Ian Culverhouse
6	MF	ENG	Neil Adams
7	FW	NGA	Efan Ekoku (Note: Ekoku was born in Cheetham, England, but also qualified to represent Nigeria internationally and made his international debut for Nigeria in 1994.)
8	DF	ENG	Colin Woodthorpe
9	MF	ENG	Gary Megson
10	DF	ENG	John Polston (vice-captain)
11	MF	WAL	Jeremy Goss (Note: Goss was born in Oekolia, Cyprus, but also qualified to represent Wales internationally and made his international debut for Wales in May 1991.)
12	FW	ENG	Mark Robins
13	GK	SCO	Scott Howie

No.	Pos.	Nation	Player
14	MF	ENG	Ruel Fox (Note: Fox was born in Ipswich, England, and played for the England B team, but also qualified to represent Montserrat internationally and would make his international debut for Montserrat in 2004.)
15	DF	ENG	Daryl Sutch
17	DF	ENG	Ian Butterworth (captain)
18	DF	ENG	Robert Ullathorne
19	MF	ENG	Andy Johnson (Note: Johnson was born in Bristol, England, but also qualified to represent Wales internationally and made his international debut for Wales in 1998.)
20	MF	ENG	Darren Eadie
21	MF	ENG	David Smith
22	FW	ENG	Chris Sutton
23	DF	WAL	Deryn Brace
24	GK	ENG	Andy Marshall
25	FW	ENG	Jamie Cureton
26	FW	ENG	Ade Akinbiyi (Note: Akinbiyi was born in Hackney, England, but also qualified to represent Nigeria internationally through his parents and would make his international debut for Nigeria in November 1999.)
27	DF	ENG	Spencer Prior

=== Left club during season ===
Note: Flags indicate national team as defined under FIFA eligibility rules; some limited exceptions apply. Players may hold more than one non-FIFA nationality.

No. / Pos. / Nation / Player; 16 / FW / IRL / Lee Power (Note: Power was born in Lewisham, England, but also qualified to represent the Republic of Ireland internationally and represented them at U-21 and B level.) (to Bradford City)	No. / Pos. / Nation / Player; 28 / GK / WAL / Mark Walton (to Dundee United)
