= Damien Duff =

Irish footballer (born 1979)

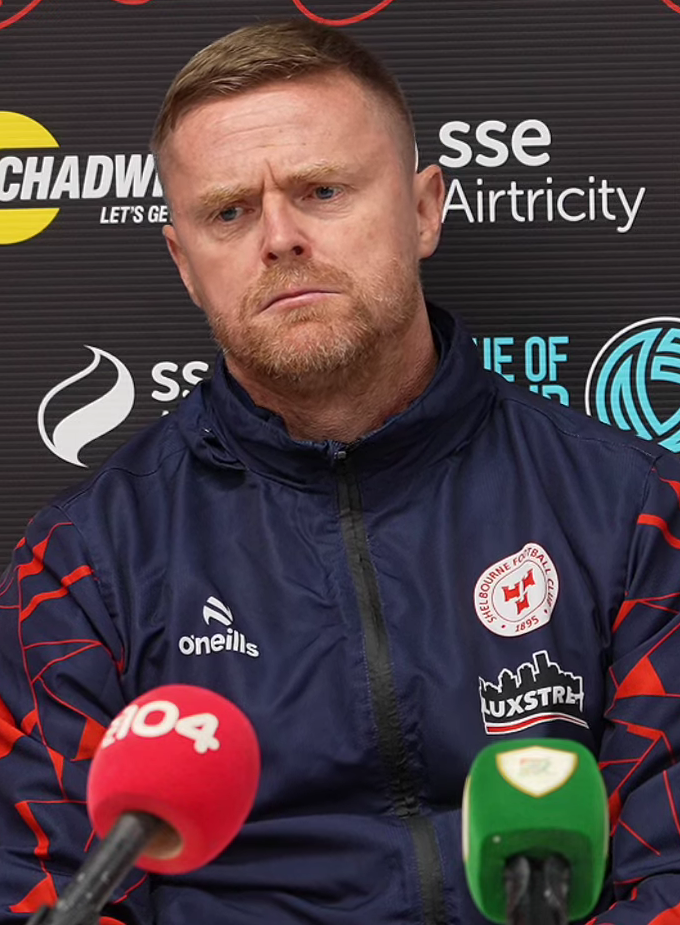
- Duff managing Shelbourne in 2025

Personal information
- Full name: Damien Anthony Duff
- Date of birth: 2 March 1979 (age 47)
- Place of birth: Ballyboden, County Dublin, Ireland
- Height: 1.78 m (5 ft 10 in)
- Position: Winger

Team information
- Current team: Brentford (assistant head coach)

Youth career
- Leicester Celtic
- Lourdes Celtic
- St. Kevin's Boys

Senior career*
Years	Team	Apps	(Gls)
1996–2003	Blackburn Rovers	185	(27)
2003–2006	Chelsea	81	(14)
2006–2009	Newcastle United	69	(5)
2009–2014	Fulham	130	(15)
2014–2015	Melbourne City	15	(1)
2015	Shamrock Rovers	9	(0)
Total		489	(62)

International career
1998–2012	Republic of Ireland	100	(8)

Managerial career
- 2021–2025: Shelbourne
Medal record
Representing Ireland
FIFA World Youth Championship
Third place	1997
- * Club domestic league appearances and goals

Damien Anthony Duff (born 2 March 1979) is an Irish professional football manager and former player, who is currently the assistant head coach of Premier League club Brentford in West London.

He began his professional playing career with Blackburn Rovers, with whom he won the Football League Cup, and in 2003 was signed for £17 million by Chelsea, where he won two Premier League titles and another League Cup. After three seasons at Stamford Bridge, he left for Newcastle United where he won the 2006 UEFA Intertoto Cup, and then moved on to Fulham, with whom he played in the 2010 UEFA Europa League final. He ended his career with brief spells in the A-League with Melbourne City and the League of Ireland with Shamrock Rovers.

After retiring in December 2015, he has moved into coaching, working with Shamrock Rovers, Celtic, Republic of Ireland youth teams , Shelbourne and Brentford

Duff was Republic of Ireland international for 14 years, earning 100 caps between 1998 and 2012. He played at the 2002 FIFA World Cup and captained the country at UEFA Euro 2012.

== Early life ==
Damien Anthony Duff was born on 2 March 1979 in Ballyboden, County Dublin.

== Club career ==
=== Blackburn Rovers ===
Duff joined Blackburn Rovers as a trainee in 1996 after playing for Leicester Celtic, Lourdes Celtic and St. Kevin's Boys as a schoolboy in Dublin. He made his Blackburn debut at the age of 18 against Leicester City on the final day of the 1996–97 season for which he won the Man of the match award. In his first full season, he scored five goals. Blackburn were relegated the following season.

Duff helped Blackburn achieve promotion back to the Premier League in 2001 and then win the League Cup in 2002, beating Tottenham Hotspur 2–1 at the Millennium Stadium in a season where he was Player of the Year. Following the 2002 World Cup, Duff signed a new four-year contract with Rovers. Despite injury problems in the 2002–03 season, he finished as Blackburn's top goalscorer with 9 league goals, which helped his team finish sixth and qualify for the UEFA Cup.

=== Chelsea ===
In the run up to the 2003–04 season, Chelsea made a series of bids for Duff, with a £17 million offer, eventually triggering a release clause in the player's contract. Duff chose to move to West London in July. Signed by manager Claudio Ranieri as part of the development of Chelsea financed by new owner Roman Abramovich, Duff made his debut in August 2003 in the Champions League against Slovak side MŠK Žilina. Chelsea won 2–0 and Duff was described as the "star of the show". He scored his first Chelsea goal on 20 September 2003 in a 5–0 away win against Wolverhampton Wanderers. Duff scored the third Chelsea goal and was named as Man of the match. Duff played 23 games in all competitions for Chelsea in the 2003–04 season scoring five goals. He missed the Champions League semi-finals as Chelsea lost to AS Monaco but was instrumental in securing for Chelsea second place in the Premier League, the club's highest league finish for 49 years as well as being part of the Champions League run, but the season ultimately ended trophyless and with the sacking of manager Claudio Ranieri.

The arrival of Dutch winger Arjen Robben and new manager José Mourinho posed a threat to Duff's place in the starting line-up for the 2004–05 season, but an injury to Robben at the start of the season saw Duff as the only available winger. Mourinho, however, did not play Duff in the early part of the 2004–05 season, preferring a more narrow approach. Duff eventually got into the side after four games and, when Robben returned to the side, Duff's versatility saw him move to the right wing and form a wing partnership with Robben. The season proved to be successful for both Duff and Chelsea. He scored ten goals, including a crucial strike in a 4–2 win against Barcelona in the Champions League, while the team won the Premier League title by 12 points from second placed Arsenal, and the League Cup, in which Duff scored the winning goal in the semi-final against Manchester United. He scored three goals in 28 league appearances in the following season as the club retained their Premier League title.

=== Newcastle United ===
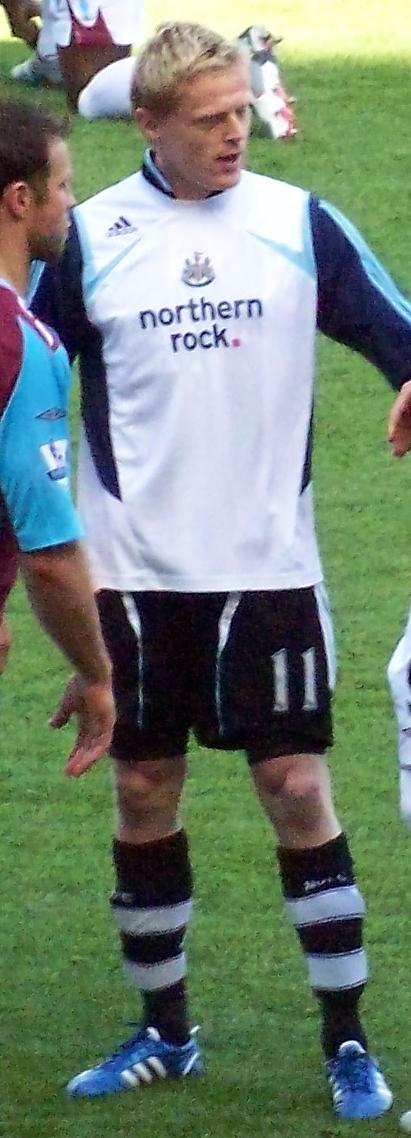
Damien Duff playing for Newcastle United, 2008

In July 2006, Duff agreed terms over a £5 million move to Newcastle United, signing a five-year contract. Duff made his competitive debut in a UEFA Cup second round qualifying first leg match against Latvian side Ventspils on 10 August 2006. He scored his first goal for Newcastle in September that year in a 2–0 victory over West Ham United away at the Boleyn Ground. Duff suffered a knee injury in November that kept him out for four months, during which Newcastle had a bad run of defeats. He returned but was then ruled out for the rest of the season due to an ankle injury in a 2–1 loss to Portsmouth in April 2007. Sam Allardyce later described Duff's injury as 'career threatening'. During Alan Shearer's short stint as interim manager, Duff was asked to play as left back.

In the final match of the 2008–09 season, against Aston Villa in a crucial relegation decider, Duff unluckily scored the deciding own goal by deflecting in a 20-yard shot by Villa's Gareth Barry which sent Newcastle down. Duff confirmed his intention to stay at the relegated club and help them back into the Premier League. On 8 August 2009, Duff scored Newcastle's first goal of the 2009–10 season in a 1–1 draw against West Bromwich Albion.

=== Fulham ===
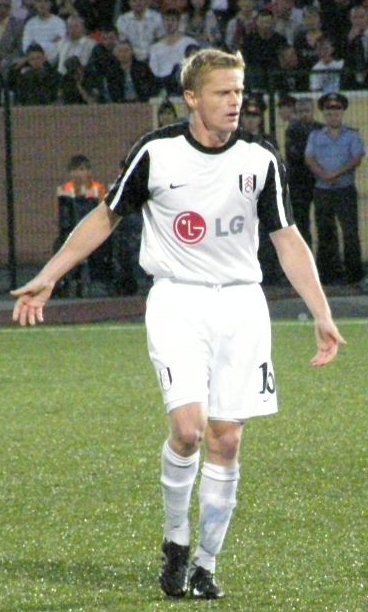
Duff in 2009

After playing one game for Newcastle in 2009–10, Duff returned to the Premier League, signing for Fulham on a three-year contract for £4 million, and re-joining Roy Hodgson, his first manager at Blackburn Rovers. He made his Fulham debut coming on as a substitute against Amkar Perm in the Cottagers' UEFA Europa League qualifier match, setting up the third goal in a 3–1 win. Duff scored his first league goal for Fulham on 13 September 2009 in a 2–1 victory over Everton, scoring in the 79th minute. On 19 December 2009, Duff scored in the 75th minute in a 3–0 victory over Manchester United. On 17 January 2010, Duff started the game against Blackburn Rovers at Ewood Park and also completed the full 90 minutes in a 2–0 defeat.

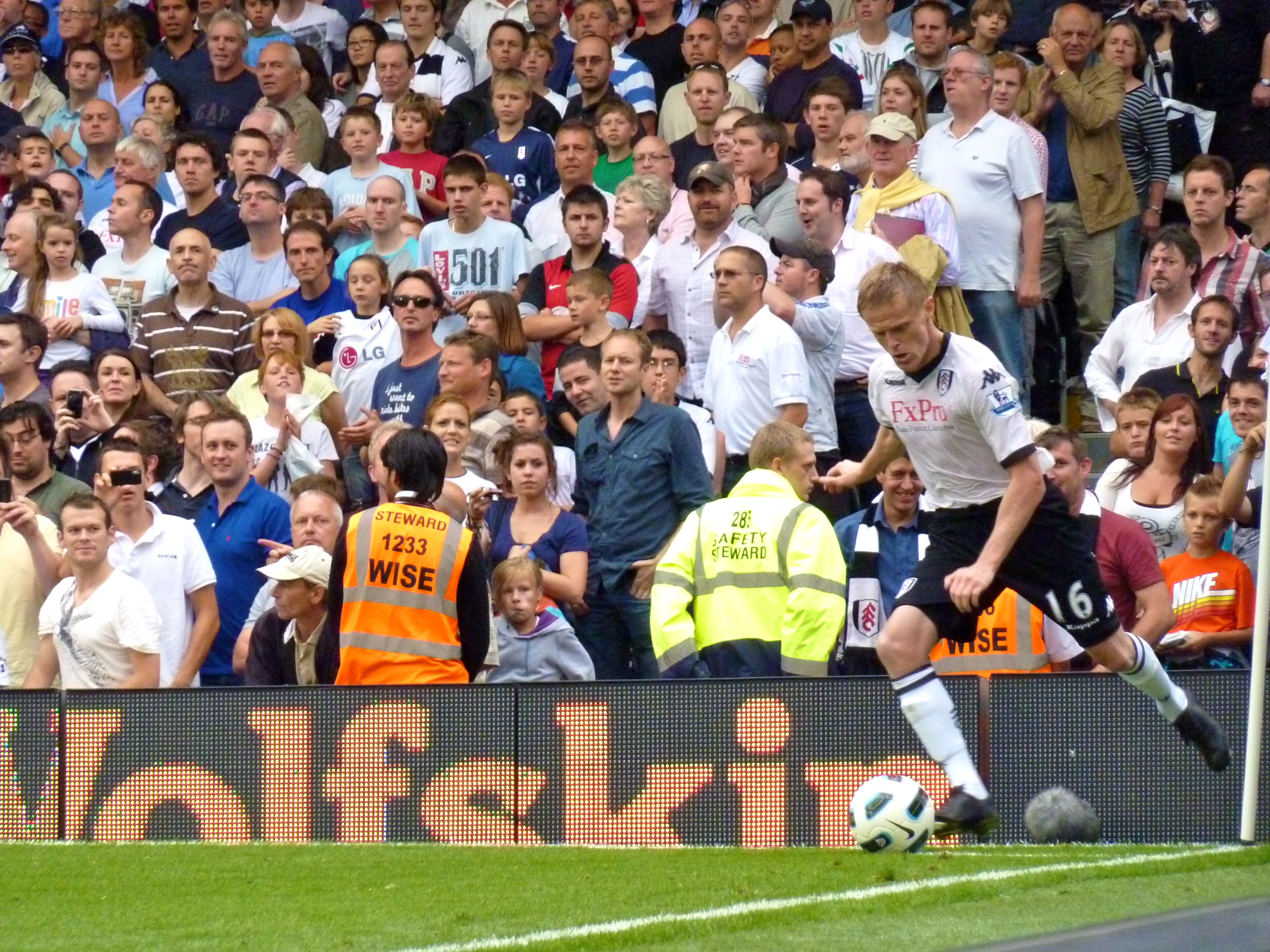
Duff taking a corner for Fulham against Manchester United, August 2010

On 22 August 2010, he started and played the full 90 minutes against Manchester United at Craven Cottage in a 2–2 draw and also picked up a booking. On 18 September 2010, he started and played the entire match against Blackburn Rovers at Ewood Park in a 1–1 draw. On 15 January 2011, Duff made his 500th career appearance in English football when he lined up against Wigan Athletic playing the full 90 minutes in a 1–1 draw at the DW Stadium. On 5 February 2011, he started the Premier League game against Aston Villa in a 2–2 draw at Villa Park, but was replaced on 67 minutes by Simon Davies. On 27 February 2011, he played the full 90 minutes and also scored a goal in the match with Manchester City at Eastlands in a 1–1 draw.

On 5 March 2011, Duff scored a brace in a 3–2 win against former side Blackburn Rovers at Craven Cottage. With the two goals, he continued a run of four goals in five matches.

About Fulham and his time at the football club, Duff stated: "I like to think that I have found my feet again here at Fulham. It's a good environment and one that players feel very comfortable in. This is a club with so much character and I'm very happy to be helping move it forward." At the end of the 2010–11 season, Duff made 27 appearances and scored 4 goals in all competitions, including making 24 Premier League appearances. On 19 August 2011, Duff signed a one-year extension to his current deal.

After nine goalless matches, Duff scored in Fulham's 2–1 win over Norwich City on 31 March 2012. A week later, on 7 April 2012, he starred in Fulham's 0–3 away win over Bolton Wanderers, setting up Clint Dempsey for the second goal of the match. During the match, which marked his 350th league appearance, he was a constant threat on the right wing. On 18 August 2012, Duff scored the opening goal in Fulham's 5–0 win over Norwich City on the opening day of the 2012–13 Premier League. He scored again in the following game, a 3–2 defeat to Manchester United.

On 22 February 2013, Duff signed a new contract with Fulham, keeping him at the club until summer 2014. On 16 April 2014, Duff confirmed his intention to leave Fulham at the end of the 2013–14 season. Duff told The Irish Times, "I'll be leaving Fulham. The club haven't spoken to me and I haven't spoken to the club but we don't need to speak." He was released from the club on 23 May.

=== Melbourne City ===
In June 2014, Duff joined Australian A-League club Melbourne City as a free transfer in a one-year deal. Duff made his debut against Sydney FC on match day one, assisting David Villa for his first goal in the A-League. Duff scored his first goal against the Newcastle Jets in a 5–2 win. In March 2015, Duff confirmed that he would leave Melbourne City to return to his homeland, with the intention of finishing his career in the League of Ireland.

=== Shamrock Rovers ===
On 14 July 2015, Duff signed for League of Ireland Premier Division club Shamrock Rovers, and revealed he would be donating his wages to charity. After nine games for the Dublin-based side, on 21 December 2015 he announced his retirement from football.

== International career ==
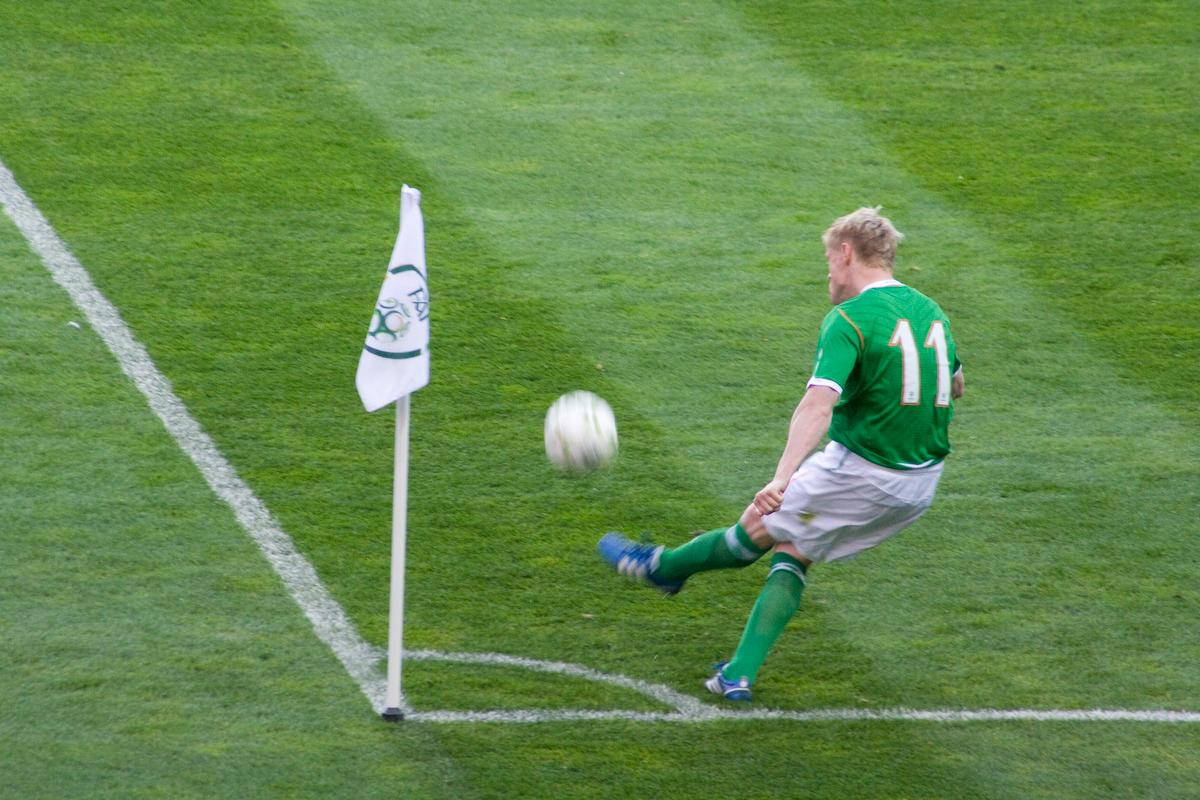
Duff taking a corner for Ireland during a game against Serbia in 2008

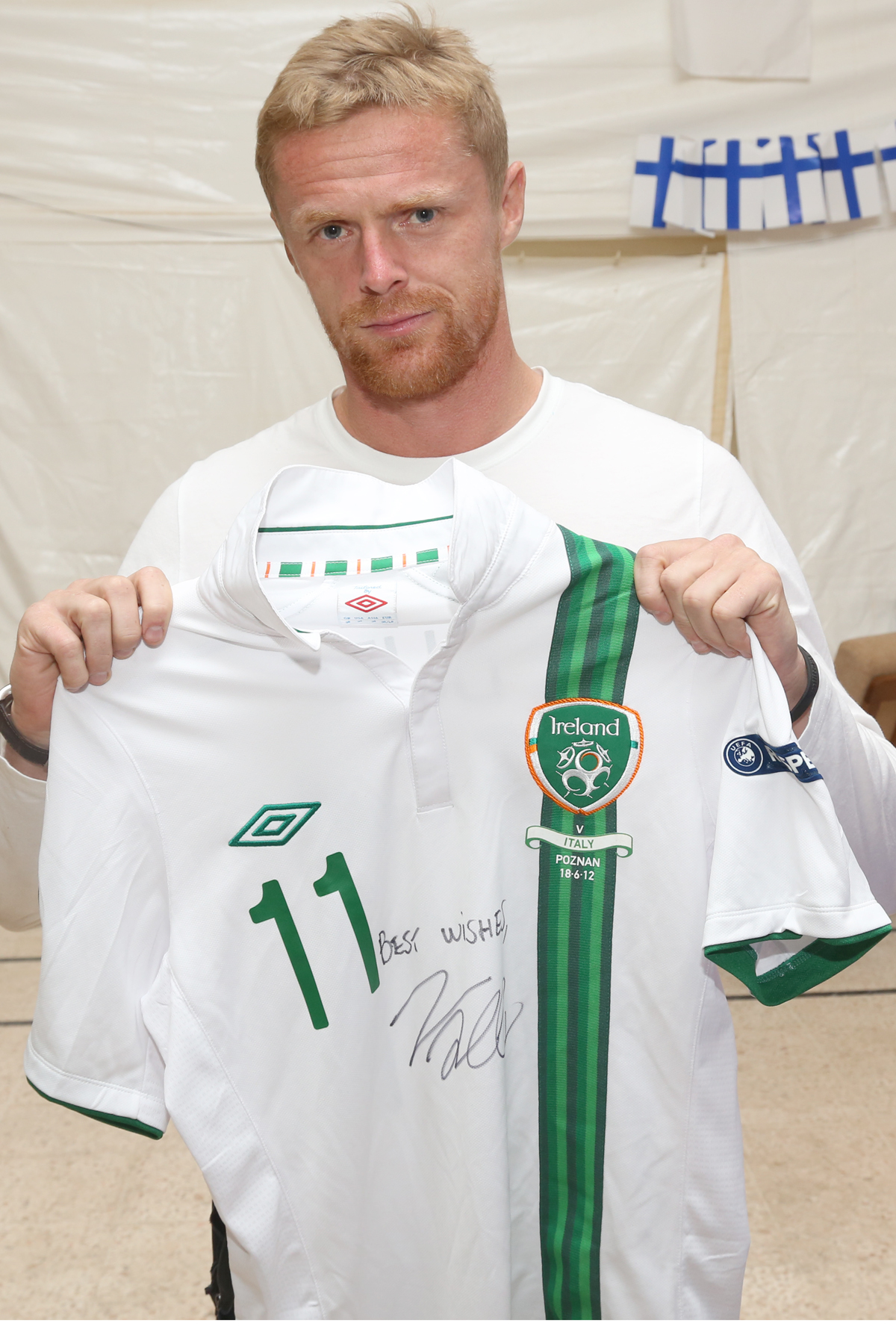
Duff in 2012

Duff played for the Republic of Ireland national under-19 football team in the 1997 UEFA European Under-18 Football Championship finals in Iceland, the 1997 and 1999 FIFA World Youth Championship. In Malaysia, he scored the first ever Golden Goal in a World Cup match.

He made his senior début for the Republic of Ireland in 1998 against the Czech Republic. He won 100 caps, making him the fifth most capped player in Irish history. He started a total of 82 times for the Republic of Ireland senior squad, scoring eight goals.

He played every game for Republic of Ireland at the 2002 FIFA World Cup and was voted the team's player of the tournament. After scoring against Saudi Arabia, en route to the second round of the FIFA World Cup, Duff marked his goal with an oriental bow, in retrospect often referred to as one of the most memorable moments of his international career. He was named as the FAI Senior International Player of the Year in 2002.

After a poor campaign, failing to qualify and a change of managers during the qualifiers for UEFA Euro 2004, he still scored two goals during the qualifiers against Georgia and Russia.

He was ever present for the Republic of Ireland in their qualifying campaign for the 2006 FIFA World Cup, but yet again, they failed to qualify. Duff's former teammate Steve Staunton took over as manager but early defeats to Germany and a humiliating 5–2 loss to Cyprus saw the Irish fail to qualify again for a major tournament, followed by another change of manager.

Under the new manager Giovanni Trapattoni, Duff started the manager's first game in charge against Serbia on 24 May 2008, which ended in a 1–1 draw. Duff became a key member of the squad proving assists for many of the goals. He started the matches in both legs against France as the Irish were controversially knocked out 2–1 on aggregate after extra-time.

Duff was ever-present on the wings for the Republic of Ireland in their UEFA Euro 2012 qualifying campaign and he was part of the team that secured qualification for UEFA Euro 2012 with an unprecedented 5–1 aggregate play-off win over Estonia. He was named in Trapattoni's 23-man squad for UEFA Euro 2012 and was given the number 11 jersey. On 18 June 2012, he captained the Republic of Ireland on his 100th cap against Italy, their final group game of the tournament. This turned out to be the last match he played representing his country.

He announced his retirement from international football on 24 August 2012.

== Coaching career ==
=== Shamrock Rovers Academy ===
During his last playing season at Shamrock Rovers, Duff coached the club's under-15 team. On 16 April 2016, it was announced that he would take on a coaching role with the Republic of Ireland under-15s, in line with the recommendation from FAI High Performance Director, Ruud Dokter, that more ex-internationals get involved in coaching roles with the national team setup. On 31 July 2016, Duff joined the Shamrock Rovers first-team coaching staff until the end of the season, with the intention that he would then take control of the under-15 group he previously managed, then competing in the League of Ireland U17 Division.

=== Celtic coach ===
Duff was appointed to a reserve team coaching position with Celtic in January 2019. When Neil Lennon became interim manager at Celtic in February 2019, Duff was promoted to first team coach, with John Kennedy promoted to assistant manager. After the club completed a third successive domestic treble, Lennon was made permanent manager, with Duff and Kennedy retaining their roles. Celtic secured a ninth league title in-a-row and fourth straight League Cup in 2019–20.

=== Republic of Ireland assistant ===
On 5 April 2020, Duff was announced as the assistant manager of the Republic of Ireland senior team to Stephen Kenny, who replaced Mick McCarthy.

=== Shelbourne Academy ===
On 24 June 2020 it was announced that in conjunction with his role as assistant manager of the Republic of Ireland senior team, Duff would also become head coach of the under-17 team at League of Ireland club Shelbourne. On 8 January 2021, Duff stepped down as Kenny's assistant.

=== Shelbourne ===
On 3 November 2021, Duff was appointed as the first team manager of League of Ireland Premier Division club, Shelbourne. His first match in senior management was a 3–0 loss at home to rivals St Patrick's Athletic on 18 February 2022. Duff led Shels to a FAI Cup Final in his first season.

While coaching for Shelbourne, Duff has criticised the English Football Leagues for not taking the League of Ireland, and Irish teams seriously, mainly in not valuing the league's players at their true value. Duff stated "Do they think we're cavemen over here? That's the stuff you're dealing with. I think we're disrespected in terms of what we offer. It's 'ah Ireland, why would you loan players to Ireland?' That's the UK club mentality."

At the end of Duff's second season in charge, he guided Shels in to UEFA Conference League qualifiers with a fourth place finish. Following the final match of the season in Drogheda, Duff spoke of his uncertainty of staying at Tolka Park as a result of the takeover by Turkish mogul Acun Ilıcalı and a difference in opinion in the club's future. Following a "concerted campaign" by Shels fans for Duff to remain at the club, Ilicali relinquished his ownership of Shels.

On 1 November 2024, Duff guided Shelbourne to the title for the first time since 2006 after a 1–0 win against Derry City with the goal coming five minutes from time on the last day of the season at the Brandywell. Duff described the title win as "Hollywood" and said it was the "pinnacle of his career". Shels had been 25/1 outsiders to win the league at the start of the season.

Duff stepped down as manager on 22 June 2025.

=== FIFA Technical Advisor ===
It was announced in October 2025 that Duff would be working for FIFA, as a Technical Advisor at the 2025 FIFA U-17 World Cup in Qatar the following month, in which he would be a member of a Technical Study Group that would attend all games at the finals and compile analysis reports.

=== Brentford assistant ===
On 12 June 2026, Duff was announced as assistant manager of Premier League club Brentford, working under his former Republic of Ireland teammate Keith Andrews.

== Personal life ==
Duff married Elaine in June 2010 at Babington House near Frome in Somerset. The couple's first child, Woody, was born a year later in the county. Duff is also a rugby fan, and is personally acquainted with some of Ireland's international rugby players.

According to the February 2009 issue of FourFourTwo magazine Duff was worth £14 million, placing him 92nd in the magazine's 2009 Football Rich List.

Duff was referenced in the song "Summertime Shootout" (featuring T-Pain) by AJ Tracey from his album Flu Game.

== Media work ==
Duff was part of RTÉ Sport's coverage of UEFA Euro 2016, UEFA Euro 2020 and 2022 FIFA World Cup.

== Career statistics ==
=== Club ===
As of match played 17 December 2015

Appearances and goals by club, season and competition
Club	Season	League			National cup (Note: Includes FA Cup, Australia Cup)		League cup (Note: Includes Football League Cup)		Continental		Other		Total	
Club	Season	Division	Apps	Goals	Apps	Goals	Apps	Goals	Apps	Goals	Apps	Goals	Apps	Goals
Blackburn Rovers	1996–97	Premier League	1	0	0	0	0	0	—		—		1	0
Blackburn Rovers	1997–98	Premier League	26	4	4	1	3	0	—		—		33	5
Blackburn Rovers	1998–99	Premier League	28	1	4	0	3	0	1 (Note: Appearances in UEFA Cup)	0	—		36	1
Blackburn Rovers	1999–00	First Division	39	5	3	1	2	1	—		—		44	7
Blackburn Rovers	2000–01	First Division	32	1	5	0	2	2	—		—		39	3
Blackburn Rovers	2001–02	Premier League	32	7	2	0	5	1	—		—		39	8
Blackburn Rovers	2002–03	Premier League	26	9	0	0	2	1	3	1	—		31	11
Blackburn Rovers	Total		184	27	18	2	17	5	4	1	—		223	35
Chelsea	2003–04	Premier League	23	5	1	0	2	0	11 (Note: Appearances in UEFA Champions League)	1	—		37	6
Chelsea	2004–05	Premier League	30	6	2	0	6	2	10	2	—		48	10
Chelsea	2005–06	Premier League	28	3	5	0	0	0	6	0	1 (Note: Appearance in FA Community Shield)	0	40	3
Chelsea	Total		81	14	8	0	8	2	27	3	1	0	125	19
Newcastle United	2006–07	Premier League	22	1	0	0	2	0	9	0	—		33	1
Newcastle United	2007–08	Premier League	16	0	3	1	0	0	—		—		19	1
Newcastle United	2008–09	Premier League	30	3	2	0	1	0	—		—		33	3
Newcastle United	2009–10	Championship	1	1	0	0	0	0	—		—		1	1
Newcastle United	Total		69	5	5	1	3	0	9	0	—		86	6
Fulham	2009–10	Premier League	32	6	4	2	0	0	14 (Note: Appearances in UEFA Europa League)	1	—		50	9
Fulham	2010–11	Premier League	24	4	2	0	1	0	—		—		27	4
Fulham	2011–12	Premier League	28	2	2	1	0	0	14	3	—		44	6
Fulham	2012–13	Premier League	31	3	2	0	1	0	—		—		34	3
Fulham	2013–14	Premier League	15	0	2	0	1	0	—		—		18	0
Fulham	Total		130	15	12	3	3	0	28	4	—		173	22
Melbourne City	2014–15	A-League	15	1	1	0	—		—		—		16	1
Shamrock Rovers	2015	LOI Premier Division	9	0	0	0	0	0	—		—		9	0
Career total			488	62	44	6	31	7	68	8	1	0	632	83

=== International ===
Appearances and goals by national team and year
National team	Year	Apps	Goals
Republic of Ireland	1998	5	0
Republic of Ireland	1999	8	0
Republic of Ireland	2000	3	0
Republic of Ireland	2001	6	1
Republic of Ireland	2002	11	1
Republic of Ireland	2003	9	4
Republic of Ireland	2004	7	0
Republic of Ireland	2005	8	0
Republic of Ireland	2006	6	1
Republic of Ireland	2007	3	0
Republic of Ireland	2008	6	0
Republic of Ireland	2009	8	0
Republic of Ireland	2010	5	0
Republic of Ireland	2011	9	1
Republic of Ireland	2012	6	0
Total		100	8

Scores and results list Republic of Ireland's goal tally first, score column indicates score after each Duff goal.

List of international goals scored by Damien Duff
No.	Date	Venue	Opponent	Score	Result	Competition
1	15 August 2001	Lansdowne Road, Dublin, Ireland	Croatia	1–0	2–2	Friendly
2	11 June 2002	International Stadium Yokohama, Yokohama, Japan	Saudi Arabia	3–0	3–0	2002 FIFA World Cup
3	29 March 2003	Mikheil Meskhi Stadium, Tbilisi, Georgia	Georgia	1–0	2–1	UEFA Euro 2004 qualifying
4	30 April 2003	Lansdowne Road, Dublin, Ireland	Norway	1–0	1–0	Friendly
5	6 September 2003	Lansdowne Road, Dublin, Ireland	Russia	1–0	1–1	UEFA Euro 2004 qualifying
6	18 November 2003	Lansdowne Road, Dublin, Ireland	Canada	1–0	3–0	Friendly
7	1 March 2006	Lansdowne Road, Dublin, Ireland	Sweden	1–0	3–0	Friendly
8	8 February 2011	Aviva Stadium, Dublin, Ireland	Wales	2–0	3–0	2011 Nations Cup

=== Managerial ===
As of match played on 20 June 2025

Managerial record by team and tenure
Team	From	To	Record							
Team	From	To	G	W	D	L	GF	GA	GD	Win %
Shelbourne	3 November 2021	22 June 2025	147	57	50	40	169	146	+23	38.78
Career total			147	57	50	40	169	146	+23	38.78

== Honours ==
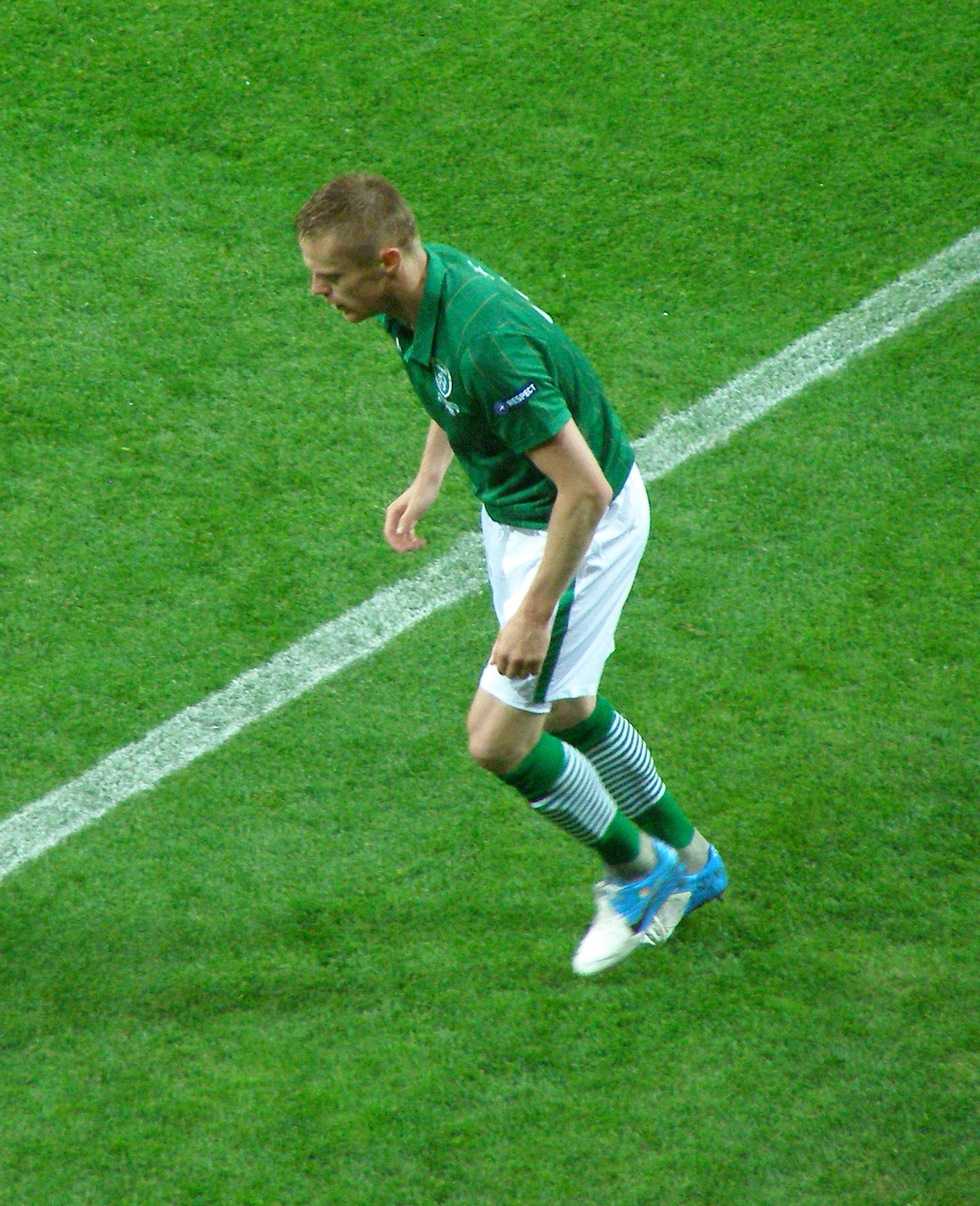
Duff with the Republic of Ireland during UEFA Euro 2012

=== Player ===
Blackburn Rovers

- Football League First Division runner-up: 2000–01
- Football League Cup: 2001–02

Chelsea

- Premier League: 2004–05, 2005–06
- Football League Cup: 2004–05
- FA Community Shield: 2005

Newcastle United

- UEFA Intertoto Cup: 2006

Fulham

- UEFA Europa League runner-up: 2009–10

Republic of Ireland U20

- FIFA World Youth Championship third place: 1997

Republic of Ireland

- Nations Cup: 2011

Individual

- FAI Senior International Player of the Year: 2002
- PFA Team of the Year: 2000–01 First Division
- UEFA Team of the Year: 2002
- SWAI Personality of the Year 2024

=== Manager ===
Shelbourne

- League of Ireland Premier Division: 2024
- President of Ireland's Cup: 2025
- FAI Cup runner-up: 2022

== See also ==
- List of footballers with 100 or more caps
