= Chris Sutton =

English football player and manager (born 1973)

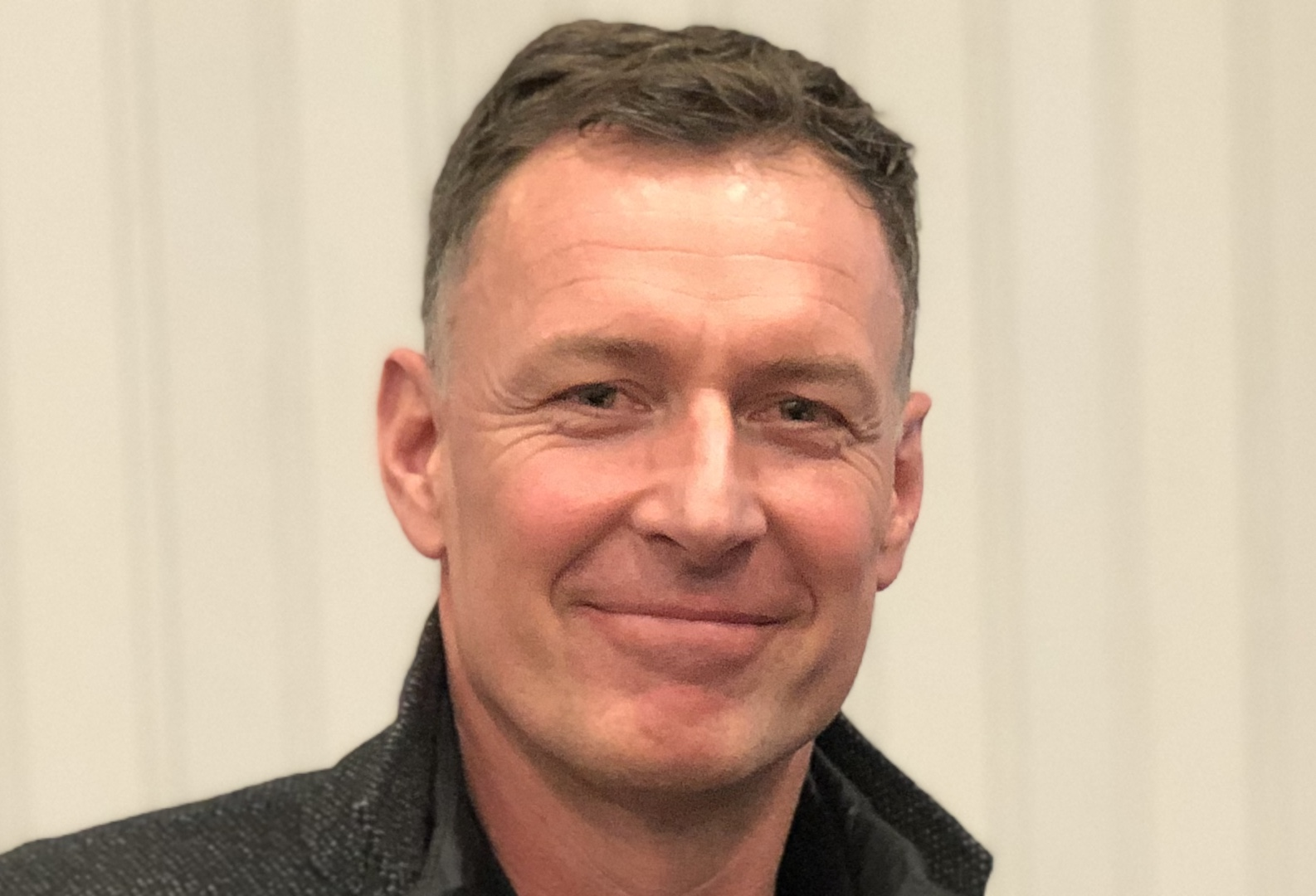
- Sutton in 2019

Personal information
- Full name: Christopher Roy Sutton
- Date of birth: 10 March 1973 (age 53)
- Place of birth: Nottingham, England
- Height: 6 ft 3 in (1.91 m)
- Position: Striker

Senior career*
Years	Team	Apps	(Gls)
1991–1994	Norwich City	102	(35)
1994–1999	Blackburn Rovers	130	(47)
1999–2000	Chelsea	28	(1)
2000–2006	Celtic	130	(63)
2006	Birmingham City	10	(1)
2006–2007	Aston Villa	8	(1)
2012	Wroxham	1	(0)
Total		409	(148)

International career
1992–1994	England U21	13	(1)
1994	England B	2	(0)
1997	England	1	(0)

Managerial career
- 2009–2010: Lincoln City
- * Club domestic league appearances and goals

Christopher Roy Sutton (born 10 March 1973) is an English former professional football player and manager. He later became a pundit, commentator and presenter of football coverage on television and radio.

Sutton played from 1991 to 2007 for Norwich City, Blackburn Rovers, Chelsea, Celtic, Birmingham City and Aston Villa. Sutton scored over 150 career goals in over 400 league appearances spanning 16 years in the English and Scottish Premier Leagues. Initially a defender, while at Norwich, he successfully moved to playing as a striker. He won the Premier League in 1995 with Blackburn Rovers and was capped once by England. He was also known as one of the foremost exponents of the glancing header, scoring many goals with this technique, which made him particularly effective from set-pieces.

In September 2009, Sutton was appointed manager of Lincoln City, but he resigned for personal reasons twelve months later. In 2012, he came out of retirement briefly and featured for non-league Wroxham.

== Early life ==
Chris Sutton was born on 10 March 1973 in Nottingham, East Midlands, England, the son of Mike Sutton, formerly a footballer with Norwich City. His younger brother John also became a footballer, and has played for a number of clubs in both England and Scotland. As a child, he moved with his family from East Leake in Nottinghamshire to Horsford in Norfolk.

== Playing career ==
=== Norwich City (1991–1994) ===
Sutton started his career as a professional footballer at Norwich City, initially as a centre-half before being converted into a striker by manager Dave Stringer. He made his debut on 4 May 1991 in a 1–0 home win over Queens Park Rangers in the First Division.

In Stringer's final season as manager, 1991–92, when Norwich reached the FA Cup semi-finals, Sutton gradually broke into the first team. He made 21 league appearances that season, scoring twice.

Sutton found success in his new position as Norwich spent most of the first season of the new FA Premier League, in 1992–93, as league leaders, before eventually slipping to third place under new manager Mike Walker. Sutton featured in 38 Premier League games that season, scoring eight goals, which made him the club's second-highest scorer behind Mark Robins.

In the autumn of 1993, Sutton was part of the side that eliminated Bayern Munich from the UEFA Cup, while he scored 25 Premier League goals in the 1993/94 season. After manager Walker went to Everton, in January 1994, and succeeded by assistant John Deehan, Norwich slipped out of the top five and finished in the 12th position. At that time, Sutton was being linked with other clubs, including Blackburn Rovers, Arsenal and Manchester United.

=== Blackburn Rovers (1994–1999) ===
Sutton became the most expensive player in English football in July 1994, when he was transferred from Norwich City to Blackburn Rovers for £5 million. In his first season at Ewood Park, he developed a partnership (known as 'SAS') with Alan Shearer and scored 15 Premier League goals, helping Blackburn Rovers to secure their first top flight league title since 1914.

A succession of injuries, combined with a loss of form, saw Sutton making only 13 Premier League appearances during the 1995–96 season and failing to score a single league goal. Shearer's regular strike partner that season became Mike Newell, but, at the end of the season, both Shearer and Newell departed from the club, leaving Sutton and Kevin Gallacher as Blackburn's only major strikers.

Sutton regained his form over the next three seasons, achieving joint highest goalscoring place in the Premier League in 1997–98, by scoring 18 times.

Sutton was involved in a controversial moment towards the end of the 1996–97 season in a league game against Arsenal at Highbury. Late in the game, with The Gunners leading by a single goal, the ball was kicked out of play by Arsenal to allow an injured teammate to receive treatment. Under the unwritten sportsmanship rule, Arsenal would expect the ball to be returned to them unhindered. Sutton chased the ball instead of allowing it to be thrown back to Arsenal and won a corner from his efforts, from which Blackburn scored. At the end of the season, Arsenal missed out on a lucrative place in the Champions League to Newcastle United on goal difference. Following the incident, Blackburn's interim manager Tony Parkes described Sutton as "a boy who was sometimes a bit dizzy ... a bit silly", stating "It was against the spirit of the game and he should not have done it".

Sutton refused to apologise for his action.

Although, in 1997/98, Sutton's 18 goals helped Blackburn finish sixth in the League and qualify for the UEFA Cup, he managed just 17 league games and three goals the following season, 1998–99, as they were relegated four years after being crowned champions.

=== Chelsea (1999–2000) ===
Sutton was sold to Chelsea for £10 million after Blackburn's relegation. His time at Stamford Bridge proved an unhappy one, as he struggled both to live up to the price tag and to adapt to Chelsea's style of play, scoring just one league goal; in the 5–0 win against Manchester United in 28 appearances, and 3 goals in total, the other 2 coming from one goal against Skonto Riga in a Champions League qualifier, and one against Hull City in the FA Cup. He failed to even make the bench for the club's FA Cup Final win against Aston Villa. In July 2000, he was sold to Scottish Premier League side Celtic for £6 million.

=== Celtic (2000–2006) ===
Sutton regained his goal-scoring form at Celtic. He scored the winner on his league debut in a 2–1 win against Dundee United in July 2000, but was then sent off in his second appearance against Motherwell. Sutton endeared himself to Celtic fans four weeks later in his first Old Firm match against Rangers – scoring the first and last goals in a dramatic 6–2 victory for Celtic. Sutton went on to form a prolific partnership with Swede Henrik Larsson.

Sutton's goals helped Celtic win three SPL titles, three Scottish Cups and one Scottish League Cup, as well as reaching the UEFA Cup final. Many of Sutton's most "memorable goals" for Celtic were scored in European competition: Against Ajax away in 2001, Juventus at Celtic Park the same year, away against Blackburn Rovers, and against VfB Stuttgart during the team's UEFA Cup run to the final in Seville in 2003, and the volley from close range against Barcelona at Celtic Park in 2004.

Sutton holds the record for the quickest goal ever in an Old Firm clash, scored at Ibrox in 2002, hitting the net inside of 18 seconds.

Sutton's nature came to the fore again at the end of the 2002–03 season when he accused Dunfermline Athletic of "lying down", in order for Celtic to lose the title. He failed to apologise and was charged with "bringing the game into disrepute." He received for the non-apology statement a one-match ban to add to the four-match suspension he was serving for abusing match officials on the same day.

Sutton's best season at Celtic was arguably the 2003–04 season, when he scored 19 SPL goals. and was voted SPFA Player of the Year. As the 2003–04 season drew to a conclusion, he struck the injury-time winner against Rangers at Celtic Park, giving his side a clean sweep of victories against their rivals that season (four league wins and one Scottish Cup win).

In Sutton's five and a half years at Celtic, Sutton showed versatility on many occasions. Although primarily a striker, he was often deployed in central midfield to allow Welsh striker John Hartson to play up front alongside Larsson. On occasion, Sutton was fielded in his original position of centre-half, notably against Rangers in a league game on 4 October 2003, which Celtic won 1–0.

As Gordon Strachan took up the reins of managing Celtic in 2005–06, his appearances for Celtic became more sporadic. Sutton departed from Celtic on a free transfer in January 2006.

=== Birmingham City (2006) ===
Sutton joined Premier League club Birmingham City in January 2006, but injuries restricted him to just eleven appearances and one goal, scored in the derby defeat to Aston Villa in mid-April. One of a number of players on high wages subjected to criticism by club owner David Sullivan, Sutton was released at the end of the season following Birmingham's relegation to the Championship.

=== Aston Villa (2006–2007) ===
In October 2006, Sutton signed until the end of the 2006–07 season with Birmingham City's arch rivals Aston Villa, managed by former Celtic boss Martin O'Neill. He scored his first goal for the club with the winner against Everton in November 2006.

However, in a game against Manchester United in December 2006, he suffered blurred vision and, despite visiting several specialists, did not recover. O'Neill said, "Chris has got a genuine concern. No-one can give him any guarantees about what might be the consequences if he got cracked on the head again. Whatever eyesight Chris has now, he would obviously want to keep, so he must bear that in mind when deciding his whole future and career." On 5 July 2007, after an eye injury, Sutton retired from football.

=== Wroxham (2012) ===
In October 2012, Sutton made a surprise appearance for the Isthmian League Division One North team Wroxham, coming on in the 63rd minute of their home game against Tilbury, as a substitute. His son Oliver, a goalkeeper, also played in the fixture for Wroxham. The home side lost the game 3–2.

== International career ==
Sutton's form for Blackburn won him an England cap on 15 November 1997, when he came on in the 79th minute against Cameroon, although he was left out of the World Cup squad after a fall-out with national manager Glenn Hoddle. Having been relegated to the England B team Sutton refused to play, and Hoddle never selected Sutton for an England squad again.

== Management career ==
=== Lincoln City ===
Sutton was interviewed in January 2009 by Inverness Caledonian Thistle for the post of manager, but was unsuccessful. On 28 September 2009, Sutton was appointed manager of League Two side Lincoln City, succeeding Peter Jackson who was dismissed earlier in the month. Despite having no managerial experience, Sutton was preferred to more than 70 other applicants. Caretaker manager Simon Clark would take charge of the following day's game, with Sutton and assistant Ian Pearce to take over the day after.

Sutton's first game as manager came at Sincil Bank against Aldershot Town on 3 October 2009. Lincoln were victorious through a second half Sergio Torres goal to give Sutton a winning start in management. Sutton took Lincoln to the FA Cup third round for the first time since 1999, but lost 4–0 to Premier League outfit Bolton Wanderers. Football League survival was confirmed on 24 April 2010 when Sutton guided the Imps to a 1–0 victory over promotion-chasing Bury at Sincil Bank, with two games remaining. Sutton left his post as Lincoln manager on 29 September due to family reasons.

== Media career ==
Sutton acted as a main co-commentator, including on all of Celtic FC's UEFA Champions League games, alongside either Rob MacLean or Rory Hamilton for TNT Sports, leaving in 2023 to join Sky Sports, again working as pundit and co-commentator for the channels Scottish football coverage. He also works as a pundit and co-commentator for BBC Radio 5 Live and BBC Sport. He also presents 606 for BBC Radio 5 Live, currently alongside Robbie Savage. In January 2015, Sutton attracted criticism for saying that Celtic's Scottish League Cup semi-final against Rangers would be "so one-sided" that Celtic "could win it blindfolded". Celtic scored twice in the first 31 minutes as the game finished 2-0.

== Personal life ==
Sutton is married with six children.

After retiring from football, Sutton remained an athlete, playing cricket for Norwich Cricket Club in the EAPL.

In February 2022, Sutton and Micah Richards spoke about mental health issues in their playing days.

== Career statistics ==
=== Club ===
Appearances and goals by club, season and competition
Club	Season	League			National cup (Note: Includes FA Cup, Scottish Cup)		League cup (Note: Includes Football League Cup, Scottish League Cup)		Europe		Other		Total	
Club	Season	Division	Apps	Goals	Apps	Goals	Apps	Goals	Apps	Goals	Apps	Goals	Apps	Goals
Norwich City	1990–91	First Division	2	0	0	0	0	0	—		0	0	2	0
Norwich City	1991–92	First Division	21	2	6	3	2	0	—		0	0	29	5
Norwich City	1992–93	Premier League	38	8	2	0	3	2	—		—		43	10
Norwich City	1993–94	Premier League	41	25	2	2	4	1	6 (Note: Appearance(s) in UEFA Cup)	0	—		53	28
Norwich City	Total		102	35	10	5	9	3	6	0	—		127	43
Blackburn Rovers	1994–95	Premier League	40	15	2	2	4	3	2	1	—		48	21
Blackburn Rovers	1995–96	Premier League	13	0	0	0	3	1	6 (Note: Appearance(s) in UEFA Champions League)	0	1	0	23	1
Blackburn Rovers	1996–97	Premier League	25	11	2	0	2	1	0	0	—		29	12
Blackburn Rovers	1997–98	Premier League	35	18	4	2	2	1	0	0	—		41	21
Blackburn Rovers	1998–99	Premier League	17	3	1	0	1	1	1	0	—		20	4
Blackburn Rovers	Total		130	47	9	4	12	7	9	1	1	0	161	59
Chelsea	1999–2000	Premier League	28	1	4	1	0	0	7	1	—		39	3
Celtic	2000–01	Scottish Premier League	24	11	4	0	3	2	4	1	—		35	14
Celtic	2001–02	Scottish Premier League	18	4	2	0	2	0	8 (Note: Seven appearances three goals in Champions League, one appearance in UEFA Cup)	3	—		30	7
Celtic	2002–03	Scottish Premier League	28	15	1	0	2	0	12 (Note: Two appearances one goal in Champions League, ten appearances three goals in UEFA Cup)	4	—		43	19
Celtic	2003–04	Scottish Premier League	25	19	4	2	1	0	14 (Note: Ten appearances six goals in Champions League, four appearances one goal in UEFA Cup)	7	—		44	28
Celtic	2004–05	Scottish Premier League	27	12	5	3	0	0	5	1	—		37	16
Celtic	2005–06	Scottish Premier League	8	2	—		1	0	1	0	—		10	2
Celtic	Total		130	63	16	5	9	2	44	16	—		199	86
Birmingham City	2005–06	Premier League	10	1	1	0	—		—		—		11	1
Aston Villa	2006–07	Premier League	8	1	0	0	1	0	—		—		9	1
Career total			408	148	40	15	31	12	66	18	1	0	546	193

=== Managerial ===
Team	From	To	Record				
Team	From	To	P	W	D	L	Win %
Lincoln City	30 September 2009	29 September 2010	50	14	13	23	28.00
Total			50	14	13	23	28.00

== Honours ==
Blackburn Rovers

- Premier League: 1994–95

Chelsea

- FA Cup: 1999–2000

Celtic

- Scottish Premier League: 2000–01, 2001–02, 2003–04, 2005–06
- Scottish Cup: 2000–01, 2003–04, 2004–05; runner-up: 2001–02
- Scottish League Cup: 2000–01; runner-up: 2002–03
- UEFA Cup runner-up: 2002–03

England U21

- Toulon Tournament: 1993

Individual

- Premier League Golden Boot: 1997–98
- Premier League Player of the Month: November 1994, February 1998
- Norwich City Player of the Season: 1993–94
- PFA Scotland Players' Player of the Year: 2003–04
- PFA Team of the Year: 1994–95 Premier League
- Scottish Premier League Player of the Month: November 2003, January 2005

== See also ==
- Norwich City F.C. Hall of Fame
