= 1991–92 Norwich City F.C. season =

Norwich City
1991–92 season
- Chairman: Robert Chase
- Manager: Dave Stringer (until 1 May); David Williams (caretaker from 1 May)
- First Division: 18th
- FA Cup: Semi-finals
- League Cup: Quarter-finals
- Full Members Cup: Second round
- Top goalscorer: Fleck (11)
- Average home league attendance: 13,858

During the 1991–92 English football season, Norwich City F.C. competed in the Football League First Division.

== Season summary ==
In the 1991–92 season, Norwich's form for most of the season was satisfying which saw them by 21 March sitting in 13th, but afterwards things started to go downhill with a poor run which saw the Canaries lose 7 of their final 8 league games, collecting only one point which saw Norwich finish in a disappointing 18th place and one day before final game of the season, Dave Stringer handed in his resignation. Their cup form that season though was excellent where they reached the FA Cup semi finals where they ended up losing 1–0 to Sunderland, and also reached the League Cup quarter finals where they lost 2–1 at Tottenham Hotspur.

== Final league table ==
Pos	Team	Pld	W	D	L	GF	GA	GD	Pts	Qualification or relegation
16	Southampton	42	14	10	18	39	55	−16	52	Qualification for the FA Premier League
17	Oldham Athletic	42	14	9	19	63	67	−4	51	Qualification for the FA Premier League
18	Norwich City	42	11	12	19	47	63	−16	45	Qualification for the FA Premier League
19	Coventry City	42	11	11	20	35	44	−9	44	Qualification for the FA Premier League
20	Luton Town (R)	42	10	12	20	38	71	−33	42	Relegation to the First Division (Note: From the 1992–93 season, the first tier became the Premier League, and the second tier, then known as the Second Division, was renamed to the First Division.)

Source: World Football
Rules for classification: 1) Points; 2) Goal difference; 3) Goals scored
(R) Relegated

== Results ==
Norwich City's score comes first

=== Legend ===
Win	Draw	Loss

=== Football League First Division ===
Date	Opponent	Venue	Result	Attendance	Scorers
17 August 1991	Sheffield United	H	2–2	16,380	Fleck (2)
21 August 1991	Queens Park Rangers	A	2–0	10,626	Gordon, Newman
24 August 1991	Oldham Athletic	A	2–2	6,944	Crook, Newman
28 August 1991	Manchester City	H	0–0	15,376	
31 August 1991	Tottenham Hotspur	H	0–1	19,460	
3 September 1991	Everton	A	1–1	19,197	Phillips
7 September 1991	Manchester United	A	0–3	44,946	
14 September 1991	West Ham United	H	2–1	15,348	Fox, Gordon
18 September 1991	Sheffield Wednesday	H	1–0	12,503	Fleck (pen)
21 September 1991	Notts County	A	2–2	9,488	Ullathorne, Bowen (pen)
28 September 1991	Leeds United	H	2–2	15,828	Gordon (2)
5 October 1991	Wimbledon	A	1–3	3,531	Beckford
19 October 1991	Southampton	A	0–0	12,516	
26 October 1991	Luton Town	H	1–0	10,514	Newman
2 November 1991	Nottingham Forest	H	0–0	13,014	
16 November 1991	Chelsea	A	3–0	15,755	Fleck (2), Bowen
23 November 1991	Coventry City	H	3–2	12,056	Bowen, Fleck, Sutton
30 November 1991	Liverpool	A	1–2	34,881	Beckford
7 December 1991	Crystal Palace	H	3–3	12,667	Own Goal, Beckford, Newman
21 December 1991	Queens Park Rangers	H	0–1	11,436	
26 December 1991	Manchester City	A	1–2	28,164	Newman
28 December 1991	Tottenham Hotspur	A	0–3	27,969	
1 January 1992	Aston Villa	H	2–1	15,318	Fleck (pen), Ullathorne
11 January 1992	Oldham Athletic	H	1–2	10,986	Beckford
18 January 1992	Sheffield United	A	0–1	17,549	
1 February 1992	Southampton	H	2–1	10,660	Ullathorne, Fleck
8 February 1992	Luton Town	A	0–2	8,554	
11 February 1992	Arsenal	A	1–1	22,352	Fox
22 February 1992	Liverpool	H	3–0	20,411	Woodthorpe, Fleck (2)
29 February 1992	Crystal Palace	A	4–3	14,201	Sutton, Newman, Polston, Goss
4 March 1992	Coventry City	A	0–0	8,549	
11 March 1992	Chelsea	H	0–1	13,413	
14 March 1992	Nottingham Forest	A	0–2	20,721	
21 March 1992	Everton	H	4–3	11,900	Newman, Beckford (3)
28 March 1992	Aston Villa	A	0–1	16,985	
31 March 1992	Manchester United	H	1–3	17,489	Power
8 April 1992	Arsenal	H	1–3	12,971	Butterworth
11 April 1992	West Ham United	A	0–4	16,896	
18 April 1992	Notts County	H	0–1	12,100	
20 April 1992	Sheffield Wednesday	A	0–2	27,362	
25 April 1992	Wimbledon	H	1–1	11,061	Fleck
2 May 1992	Leeds United	A	0–1	32,673	

=== FA Cup ===
Round	Date	Opponent	Venue	Result	Attendance	Goalscorers
R3	4 January 1992	Barnsley	H	1–0	12,189	
R4	5 February 1992	Millwall	H	2–1	17,010	Bowen, Fleck
R5	15 February 1992	Notts County	H	3–0	14,511	Sutton (2), Phillips
QF	7 March 1992	Southampton	A	0–0	20,088	
QFR	18 March 1992	Southampton	H	2–1 (a.e.t.)	21,017	Newman, Sutton
SF	5 April 1992	Sunderland	N	0–1	40,102	

=== League Cup ===
Round	Date	Opponent	Venue	Result	Attendance	Goalscorers
R2 1st Leg	25 September 1991	Charlton Athletic	A	2–0	2,886	Gordon, Newman
R2 2nd Leg	9 October 1991	Charlton Athletic	H	3–0 (won 5–0 on agg)	5,507	Fleck ??', 35', Beckford 69'
R3	30 October 1991	Brentford	H	4–1	7,394	Fox 50', Fleck 51', Beckford 74', 85'
R4	4 December 1991	West Ham United	H	2–1	16,325	Fleck ??', pen 90+3'
R5	8 January 1992	Tottenham Hotspur	A	1–2	29,471	Fleck

=== Full Members Cup ===
Round	Date	Opponent	Venue	Result	Attendance	Goalscorers
SR2	23 October 1991	Queens Park Rangers	H	1–2	4,436	Beckford

== Squad ==
Note: Flags indicate national team as defined under FIFA eligibility rules; some limited exceptions apply. Players may hold more than one non-FIFA nationality.

Pos.	Nation	Player
GK	SCO	Bryan Gunn
DF	ENG	Ian Culverhouse
DF	ENG	Ian Butterworth
DF	ENG	Robert Ullathorne
DF	WAL	Mark Bowen
MF	ENG	Ian Crook
MF	WAL	David Phillips
MF	ENG	Ruel Fox
MF	WAL	Jeremy Goss
FW	SCO	Robert Fleck
FW	ENG	Chris Sutton
DF	ENG	Daryl Sutch
GK	WAL	Mark Walton
DF	ENG	John Polston

Pos.	Nation	Player
DF	ENG	Colin Woodthorpe
MF	ENG	Tim Sherwood
FW	ENG	Darren Beckford
DF	ENG	Rob Newman
FW	IRL	Lee Power
MF	ENG	Dale Gordon
MF	WAL	Andy Johnson
DF	ENG	Paul Blades
MF	ENG	David Smith
MF	ENG	Jason Minett
MF	ENG	Steve Ball
DF	ENG	Adrian Pennock
GK	IRL	Gerry Peyton (on loan from Everton)
FW	DEN	Henrik Mortensen

== Transfers ==
=== In ===
Date	Pos	Name	From	Fee
14 June 1991	FW	Darren Beckford	Port Vale	£925,000
15 July 1991	DF	Rob Newman	Bristol City	£600,000

=== Out ===
Date	Pos	Name	To	Fee
31 August 1991	FW	Rob Taylor	Birmingham City	Signed
8 November 1991	MF	Dale Gordon	Rangers	£1,200,000
12 February 1992	MF	Tim Sherwood	Blackburn Rovers	£500,000

Transfers in: ▼£1,525,000
Transfers out: ▲£1,700,000
Total spending: ▲£175,000
