= Stéphane Henchoz =

Swiss footballer and coach (born 1974)

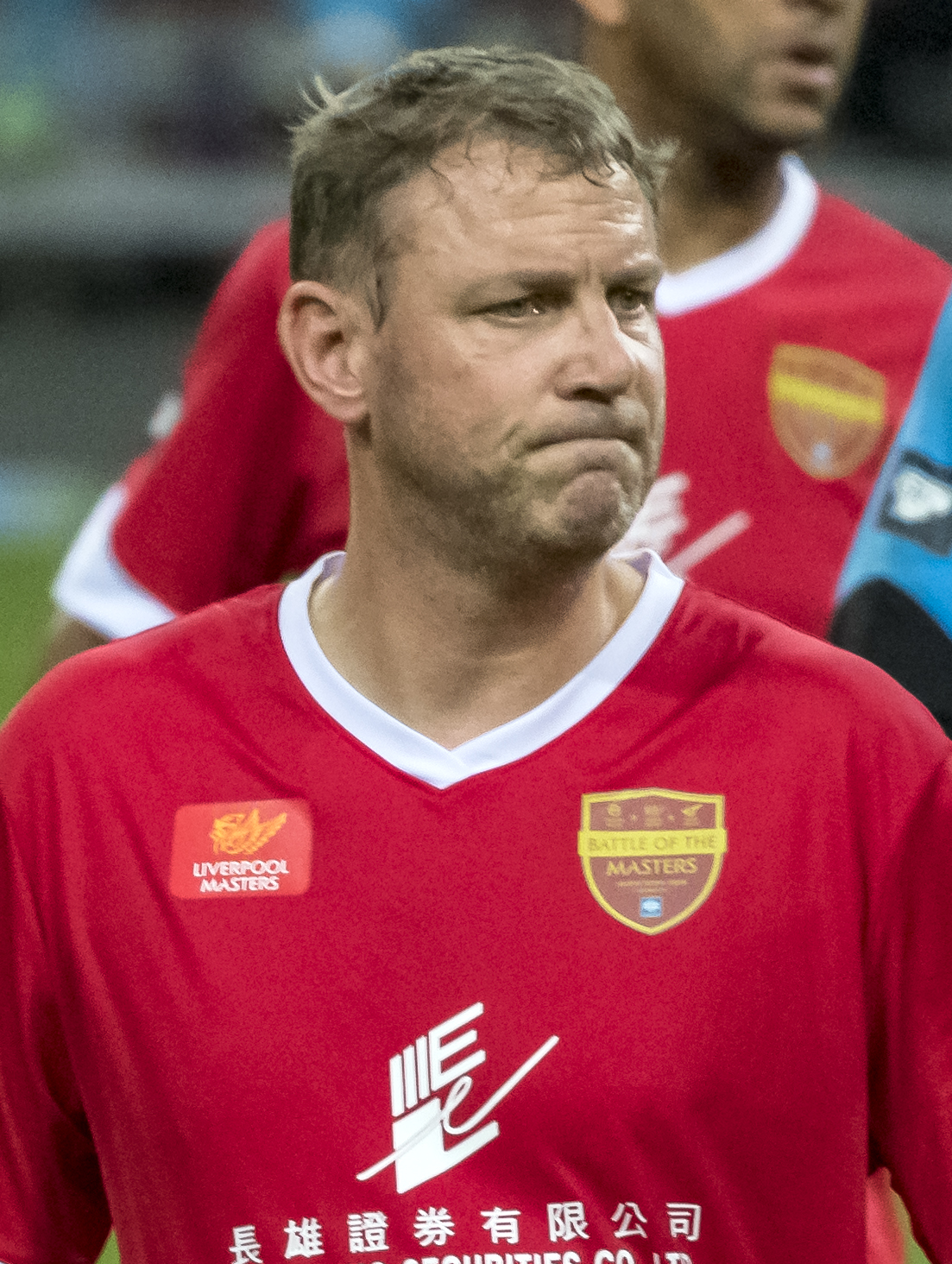
- Henchoz in 2017

Personal information
- Full name: Stéphane Henchoz
- Date of birth: 7 September 1974 (age 52)
- Place of birth: Billens, Switzerland
- Height: 1.84 m (6 ft 0 in)
- Position: Centre-back

Youth career
- 1989–1991: FC Bulle

Senior career*
Years	Team	Apps	(Gls)
1992–1995	Servette	5	(0)
1992–1995	Neuchâtel Xamax	103	(2)
1995–1997	Hamburger SV	49	(2)
1997–1999	Blackburn Rovers	70	(0)
1999–2005	Liverpool	135	(0)
2005	Celtic	6	(0)
2005–2006	Wigan Athletic	26	(0)
2006–2008	Blackburn Rovers	12	(0)
Total		406	(4)

International career
1993–2006	Switzerland	72	(0)

Managerial career
- 2008–2009: Blackburn Rovers (U18)
- 2009–2010: FC Bulle
- 2015–2019: Neuchâtel Xamax (assistant)
- 2019: Neuchâtel Xamax
- 2019: Sion
- 2020: Neuchâtel Xamax
- * Club domestic league appearances and goals

Stéphane Henchoz (French pronunciation: [ɑ̃ʃo]; born 7 September 1974) is a Swiss football coach and a former professional player who played as a centre-back, most notably for the English club Liverpool. He was capped 72 times and played for the Switzerland national team from his debut in 1993, and played at Euro 1996 and Euro 2004.

== Club career ==
=== Early career ===
Born in Billens, Switzerland, Henchoz first came to notice playing in the German Bundesliga for Hamburger SV.

=== Blackburn Rovers ===
In June 1997, he turned down an opportunity to join Manchester United, instead signing for Blackburn Rovers for a fee of £3 million. Henchoz enjoyed a very successful debut Premiership season as Rovers finished sixth in 1997–98, although they were then relegated at the end of the 1998–99 season. Henchoz, however, remained in the Premiership, after being purchased for £3.5 million by Liverpool.

=== Liverpool ===
At Liverpool, Henchoz became a regular member of the first team during his five-and-a-half-year stay at Anfield. Henchoz proved to be an inspirational signing and was popular with the Liverpool fans. He formed an effective central defensive partnership with Sami Hyypiä. This partnership played an important part in Liverpool's historic cup treble in 2001, although it was Henchoz's clumsy challenge on Martin O'Connor in the 90th minute of the League Cup final against Birmingham City that led to extra time (the match itself was only settled on penalties). Henchoz is also remembered for inadvertently blocking a goalbound Thierry Henry shot with his arm in the 17th minute of that year's FA Cup final, Liverpool then went on to win the match with two Michael Owen finishes.

His last two seasons were interrupted due to spells of injury, but he still surpassed the 200 mark of games for Liverpool in 2003–04.

With injury problems and Gerard Houllier preferring Igor Bišćan at centre half, Henchoz became something of a bit part player appearing as an occasional right back. Eventually, the Henchoz-Hyypiä partnership was rekindled in 2003–04, helping Liverpool to fourth place in the league.

=== Celtic ===
When Rafael Benítez replaced Gérard Houllier as manager, his decision to try versatile English defender Jamie Carragher in partnership with Hyypiä spelled an end to Henchoz's Anfield career. Carragher, previously employed as a full-back, was a revelation at centre back and Henchoz consequently joined Celtic on a six-month contract in January 2005.

=== Wigan Athletic ===
Upon the expiration of his Celtic contract, Henchoz opted to move back to the Premier League, signing a one-year contract with newly promoted Wigan Athletic. He made 26 league appearances during the 2005–06 season as the club exceeded expectations with a top half finish. Henchoz also started for Wigan in the 2006 Football League Cup Final.

=== Return to Blackburn Rovers ===
Henchoz left Wigan after only a year, signing a contract until the end of the 2006–07 season with Blackburn Rovers. He was used sparingly during the season to fill in for injuries, but performed suitably. His second spell at Blackburn came to an end on 19 May, when he was released by Mark Hughes.

Henchoz ended his career on 13 October 2008.

== International career ==
Henchoz earned 72 caps for the Switzerland national team from his debut in 1993. He played for the country at Euro 96 and Euro 2004. He was expected to play in the 2006 FIFA World Cup, but due to health problems he retired from international football on 31 March 2006.

== Coaching career ==
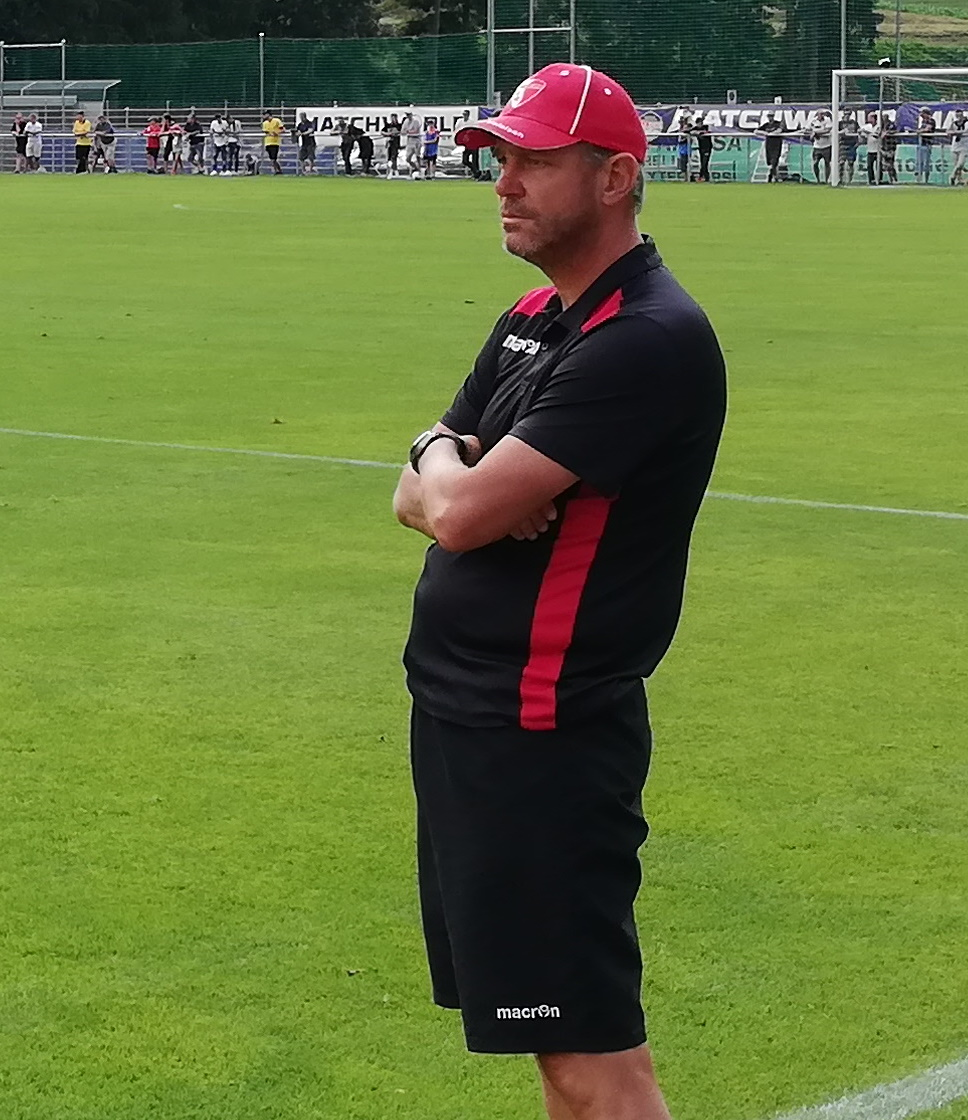
Stéphane Henchoz on the touchline for FC Sion

After retiring, Henchoz became manager of Blackburn Rovers's U18 team which he was until June 2009. He then became manager of FC Bulle for the 2009–10 season.

In December 2015, he was appointed assistant manager of Neuchâtel Xamax. On 6 February 2019, the club announced, that they had sacked Michel Decastel and Henchoz would take charge of the club for the rest of the season. At the end of March 2019, the club confirmed that Henchoz would leave his position at the end of the season.

On 27 May 2019, Henchoz was appointed manager of Sion for the upcoming 2019–20 season. He resigned on 4 November 2019 following a 3–0 loss to St. Gallen, which was the fifth loss in six league games.

In July 2020, he returned to Neuchâtel Xamax.

== Career statistics ==
Appearances and goals by club, season and competition
Club	Season	League			National cup		League cup		Europe		Other		Total	
Club	Season	Division	Apps	Goals	Apps	Goals	Apps	Goals	Apps	Goals	Apps	Goals	Apps	Goals
Servette	1990–91	Nationalliga A	5	0			–		–				5	0
Neuchâtel Xamax	1991–92	Nationalliga A					–		1	0			1	0
Neuchâtel Xamax	1992–93	Nationalliga A	35	0			–		2	0			37	0
Neuchâtel Xamax	1993–94	Nationalliga A	33	2			–				–		33	2
Neuchâtel Xamax	1994–95	Nationalliga A	35	0			–				–		35	0
Neuchâtel Xamax	Total		103	2			0	0	3	0	0	0	106	2
Hamburger SV	1995–96	Bundesliga	31	2	1	0	–		0	0	–		32	2
Hamburger SV	1996–97	Bundesliga	18	0	4	0	–		5	0	–		27	0
Hamburger SV	Total		49	2	5	0	0	0	5	0	0	0	59	2
Blackburn Rovers	1997–98	Premier League	36	0	4	0	1	0	–		–		41	0
Blackburn Rovers	1998–99	Premier League	34	0	2	0	3	0	2	0	–		41	0
Blackburn Rovers	Total		70	0	6	0	4	0	2	0	0	0	82	0
Liverpool	1999–2000	Premier League	29	0	2	0	2	0	0	0	–		33	0
Liverpool	2000–01	Premier League	32	0	5	0	6	0	10	0	–		53	0
Liverpool	2001–02	Premier League	37	0	2	0	0	0	15	0	2 (Note: Appearances in UEFA Super Cup and FA Charity Shield)	0	56	0
Liverpool	2002–03	Premier League	19	0	2	0	4	0	6	0	1 (Note: Appearances in FA Community Shield)	0	32	0
Liverpool	2003–04	Premier League	18	0	4	0	1	0	4	0	–		27	0
Liverpool	2004–05	Premier League	0	0	0	0	3	0	1	0	–		4	0
Liverpool	Total		135	0	15	0	16	0	36	0	0	0	205	0
Celtic	2004–05	Scottish Premier League	6	0	2	0	0	0	0	0	–		8	0
Wigan Athletic	2005–06	Premier League	26	0	2	0	4	0	0	0	–		32	0
Blackburn Rovers	2006–07	Premier League	12	0	2	0	1	0	1	0	–		16	0
Blackburn Rovers	2007–08	Premier League	0	0	0	0	0	0	0	0	–		0	0
Blackburn Rovers	Total		12	0	2	0	1	0	1	0	0	0	16	0
Career total			406	4	32	0	25	0	47	0	3	0	513	4

== Honours ==
Liverpool

- FA Cup: 2000–01
- Football League Cup: 2000–01, 2002–03
- FA Charity Shield: 2001
- UEFA Cup: 2000–01
- UEFA Super Cup: 2001

Celtic

- Scottish Cup: 2004–05

Wigan Athletic

- Football League Cup runner-up: 2005–06

Individual

- Credit Suisse Player of the Year: 2001, 2002
