= Jimmy Corbett =

English footballer

Personal information
- Full name: James John Corbett
- Date of birth: 6 July 1980 (age 46)
- Place of birth: Hackney, London, England
- Position: Midfielder

Youth career
- 1995–1996: Gillingham

Senior career*
Years	Team	Apps	(Gls)
1997–1998	Gillingham	17	(2)
1998–2003	Blackburn Rovers	0	(0)
2000	→ Portsmouth (loan)	0	(0)
2003	→ Darlington (loan)	10	(2)
2003–2005	Southend United	23	(2)
2005	→ Dagenham & Redbridge (loan)	?	(?)
2005	Margate	1	(0)
2005–2006	Welling United	?	(?)
2006–2008	Folkestone Invicta	?	(?)
2009	Faversham Town	?	(?)
2010–2011	Herne Bay	?	(?)
- * Club domestic league appearances and goals as of 15:14, 24 December 2011 (UTC)

James John Corbett (born 6 July 1980) is an English retired footballer. He played in the Football League for Gillingham, Blackburn Rovers, Portsmouth, Darlington and Southend United before dropping into non-League football.

== Career ==
A midfielder, Corbett first became recognised while playing at Gillingham. He was playing in the first team at the age of 17 and his performances attracted attention from Premier League teams, leading to him joining Blackburn Rovers in 1998, for a fee of £525,000, potentially rising to £1m depending on appearances. After joining Blackburn, he was unable to find the form that had attracted so many Premier League teams to him, due to extensive injury problems, including two broken ankles. Without playing a single game for Blackburn in the league, he was sent out on loan to Portsmouth, and then to Darlington.

After being released by Blackburn at the end of the 2002–03 season he joined Southend United on a one-year contract, which was extended by a further year at the conclusion of the 2003–04 season. He played a minor part in the Southend team until 2005 when he was released again. He had a trial for Welling United, but a permanent move never materialised. He later joined Folkestone Invicta in 2006 before leaving by mutual consent in December 2008.

He signed for Kent League side Faversham Town ahead of the 2009–10 season. Corbett was forced to retire in December 2011, aged 31, after persistent injury problems.
