= History of Norwich City F.C. =

History of an English football club

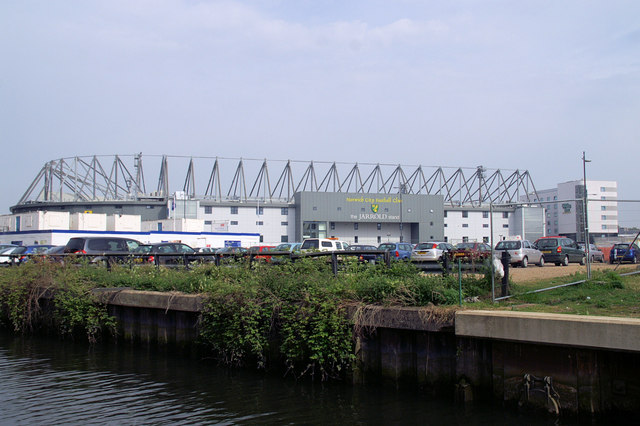
Carrow Road, built in 82 days and Norwich City's home since 1935

The history of Norwich City F.C. stretches back to 1902. After a brief period in amateur football, Norwich City F.C. spent 15 years as a semi-professional team in the Southern League before admission to English Football League in 1920. For most of the next 50 years, Norwich City F.C. played in Division Three (South), then the joint lowest tier of the football league, a period that was distinguished by "a thrilling giant-killing sequence which took them to the FA Cup semi-finals" in 1959. Shortly afterwards, the club won its first major trophy, the 1962 League Cup. Norwich finally reached the pinnacle of the league structure in 1972, with their first promotion to the top tier.

Since then, Norwich City has acquired a reputation as a "yo-yo club", with, to the end of the 2017–18 season, 25 seasons in the top league and 19 in the second tier. It is during this period that the club has achieved most of its greatest distinctions, claiming its second major trophy, the League Cup in 1985, reaching two more FA Cup semi finals, finishing fifth, fourth and third in the top division and beating Bayern Munich in the UEFA Cup.

In the course of its history, Norwich City has survived incidents that threatened its survival, including ousting from amateur football, the need to be re-elected to The Football League and financial crises. Geoffrey Watling, who was to become club chairman and after whom a stand at the club's stadium, Carrow Road is named, was instrumental in saving the club from bankruptcy, both in the 1950s and 1990s; his father had played a similar role in 1919.

== Early years: 1902–1930 ==
Norwich City F.C. was formed following a meeting at the Criterion Cafe in Norwich on 17 June 1902 by a group of friends led by two former Norwich CEYMS players, and played their first competitive match against Harwich & Parkeston, at Newmarket Road on 6 September 1902. They also joined the Norfolk & Suffolk League for the 1902–03 season. Originally, the club was nicknamed the Citizens, and played in light blue and white halved shirts. The popular pastime of canary rearing had given rise to the team's nickname of "The Canaries" by April 1905, and by February 1907 this moniker had been adopted by the national press. The following season, inspired by the nickname, City played for the first time in Canary livery; yellow shirts with green collars and cuffs. A local paper reported that "The Cits are dead but the Canaries are very much alive".

Norwich played for just over two seasons as an amateur club under The Football Association (FA). Following an FA Commission of inquiry, the club was informed on the last day of 1904 that they had been deemed a professional organisation and hence ineligible to compete in amateur football. The main allegations were:

fees ... paid for the use of a gymnasium and also for the training and massage of players. The sum of £8 was also paid to a player when he left the club. Payments were made to players without a receipt being taken. The club advertised for players ... [the] secretary ... spent considerable sums of money in travelling to other towns in East Anglia ... complete outfits ... were bought for players out of club funds ... there was no adequate system for checking gate money ... travelling expenses were ... excessive.

The club officials, including founding chairman Robert Webster, had to be removed from office and Norwich were to be ousted from the amateur game at the end of the season. The response was swift: at a meeting, just two days later, Wilfrid Lawson Burgess became the first chairman of the professional club and it was resolved to find a place in the professional game. The decision was endorsed at a public meeting in March 1905, a meeting that, significantly, was attended by Nat Whitaker, secretary of the Southern League. He seconded a motion proposed by a local businessman that endorsed the club's "... determination to run a first class professional team". Whitaker actively supported Norwich, as he wanted the league's influence to spread eastwards. On 30 May 1905, they were elected to play in the Southern League, in place of Wellingborough.

With increasing attendances at matches and strict new clauses included in a proposed lease extension, Norwich were forced to leave Newmarket Road and move to a converted disused chalk pit in Rosary Road which became known as "The Nest". Works at The Nest, which included dismantling and moving the stands from Newmarket Road, were complete in time for the start of the 1908–09 season. On 10 December 1917, with football suspended during the First World War and the club facing spiralling debts, City went into voluntary liquidation. The club was officially reformed on 15 February 1919; a key figure in the events was a Mr C Watling, father of future club chairman, Geoffrey Watling. In May 1920, the Football League formed a Third Division, to which Norwich was admitted for the following season. Their first league fixture, against Plymouth, on 28 August 1920, ended in a 1–1 draw. The club endured a mediocre first decade in the league, finishing no higher than eighth but no lower than 18th. It was during this period that the players began to wear a canary emblem on their shirts. A simple canary badge was first adopted in 1922; a variation is used to this day.

== Striving to reach the top level: 1930–1972 ==
The 1930s began with a brush with disaster – the side finished bottom of the league in 1931, but were successful in their bid for re-election. The rest of the decade proved more successful for Norwich, with a club-record victory, 10–2, (Note: On 15 March 1930, Thomas Hunt scored five goals. The half-time score was 4–0; the 8,230 supporters saw eight second-half goals) over Coventry City and promotion to the Second Division as champions in the 1933–34 season under the management of Tom Parker.

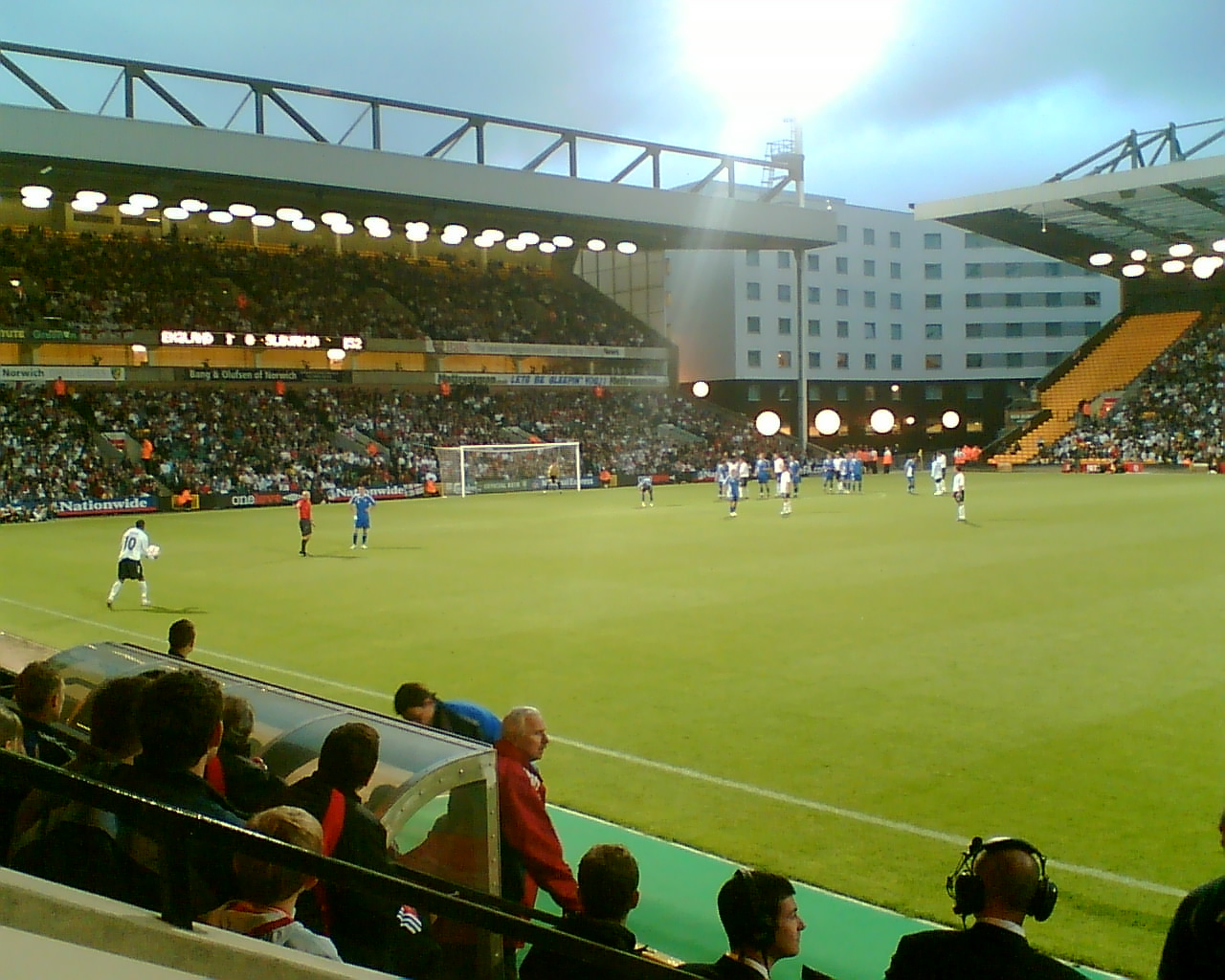
A view of Carrow Road in 2007

With rising crowds and the Football Association raising concerns over the suitability of The Nest, the club considered renovation, but ultimately decided on a move to Carrow Road. The original stadium was terraced on three sides, with only one stand (along Carrow Road) having wooden bench seating and a roof. Construction took 82 days and the inaugural match at the new ground, held on 31 August 1935, against West Ham United, ended in a 4–3 victory for the home team and set a new record attendance of 29,779. A highlight of the fourth season at Carrow Road was the visit of King George VI on 29 October 1938; this was the first occasion a reigning monarch attended a second-tier football match. The club was relegated back to the Third Division at the end of the season. Norwich's anguish was exacerbated by the closeness of the relegation fight; having finished second from bottom of Division Two, they were demoted on a goal average difference of just 0.05.

The league was suspended the following season as a result of the outbreak of the Second World War, and professional play did not resume until the 1946–47 season. City finished this and the following season in 21st place, the poor results forcing the club to apply for re-election to the league. The lacklustre performances did not deter the crowds, and, in 1948, Carrow Road attracted its record attendance; 37,863 spectators watched City play Notts County. The club narrowly missed out on promotion under the guidance of manager Norman Low in the early 1950s, but following the return of Tom Parker as manager, Norwich finished bottom of the football league in the 1956–57 season. Events off the field were to overshadow the team's performances as the club faced financial difficulties severe enough to render them non-viable. With debts amounting to more than £20,000, the club was rescued by the formation of a new board, chaired by Geoffrey Watling and the creation of an appeal fund chaired by the Lord Mayor of Norwich, Arthur South, which raised more than £20,000. For these and other services to the club, both men (now deceased) were later honoured by having stands named after them at Carrow Road. (Note: The South Stand was later renamed the Jarrold Stand. See Carrow Road#Stands)

Archie Macaulay became manager when the club was reformed and he oversaw one of the club's greatest achievements, its run to the semi-final of the 1958–59 FA Cup. Competing as a Third Division side, Norwich defeated two First Division opponents along the way, notably a 3–0 win against the Manchester United "Busby Babes". City lost the semi-final only after a replay against another First Division side, Luton Town. The team of 1958–59 – including Terry Bly who scored seven goals in the run, and Ken Nethercott who played most of the second half of one match in goal despite a dislocated shoulder – is today well represented in the club Hall of Fame. The "59 Cup Run" as it is now known locally, "remains as one of the truly great periods in Norwich City's history". Norwich were the third-ever Third Division team to reach the FA Cup semi-final. In the 1959–60 season, Norwich were promoted to the Second Division after finishing second to Southampton, and achieved a fourth-place finish in the 1960–61 season. From 1960, Norwich spent the next 12 seasons in the second tier, with finishes of fourth in 1961 and sixth in 1965 being among the most notable.

In 1962, Ron Ashman guided Norwich to their first trophy, defeating Rochdale 4–0 on aggregate in a two-legged final to win the League Cup. Norwich finally achieved promotion from Division Two when they finished as champions in the 1971–72 season under manager Ron Saunders; Norwich City had reached the highest level of English football for the first time.

== First division yo-yo: 1972–1992 ==
A graph showing Norwich City's league positions from joining the Football League in 1920 until 2022

Norwich made their first appearance at Wembley Stadium in 1973, losing the League Cup final 1–0 to Tottenham Hotspur. Relegation to the Second Division in 1974 resulted in the resignation of Saunders and the appointment of John Bond. A highly successful first season saw promotion back to the First Division and another visit to Wembley, again in the League Cup final, this time losing 1–0 to Aston Villa. They remained in the top-tier of English football for another six seasons. The club finished tenth in the 1975–76 season; at the time their highest ever finish. Off the field, during Bond's tenure, a new River End stand was constructed at Carrow Road. Bond resigned during the 1980–81 season and the club were relegated, but bounced back the following season after finishing third.

The 1984–85 season was one of mixed fortunes for the club; a fire gutted the old Main Stand on 25 October 1984 but on the pitch, under Ken Brown's management, they reached the final of the Milk Cup at Wembley Stadium. They defeated local rivals Ipswich Town in the semi-final. In the final, they beat Sunderland 1–0, but in the league both Norwich and Sunderland were relegated to the second tier of English football. Norwich had qualified for a place in the UEFA Cup, but were denied their first foray into European competition when English club sides were banned, following the Heysel Stadium disaster. City made an immediate return to the top flight by winning the Second Division championship in the 1985–86 season. High league placing in the First Division in 1988–89 would have been enough for UEFA Cup qualification, but the ban on English clubs was still in place. They also had good cup runs during his period, reaching the FA Cup semi-finals in 1989 and again in 1992.

== Europe, rise and fall: 1992–1999 ==
In 1992–93, the inaugural season of the English Premier League, Norwich City led the league for much of the season, having been among the pre-season favourites for relegation, and were eight points clear of the field shortly before Christmas, before faltering in the final weeks to finish third behind the champions, Manchester United, and Aston Villa. They had their strength from the first day of the Premier League season, achieving a 4–2 away win over an Arsenal side who were among the pre-season title favourites in a race finally won by Manchester United. This was a big surprise not least to the media and pundits who had tipped Norwich for a season of struggle.

The following season Norwich played in the UEFA Cup for the first time, defeating Vitesse Arnhem of the Netherlands 3–0 in the first round. In the second round, they faced Bayern Munich of Germany. Norwich won the tie 3–2 on aggregate; their 2–1 victory in Munich earning them a place in history, as the only English team to beat Bayern Munich in the Olympic Stadium. (Note: Bayern Munich moved to the Allianz Arena at the beginning of the 2005–06 season, meaning this achievement cannot be matched. See Olympic Stadium, Munich.) The Independent described the win in Munich as "the pinnacle of Norwich City's history". Reflecting on the shock result, Four Four Two wrote "The news that Norwich had gone 2–0 up in the Olympic Stadium seemed frankly surreal." Norwich's cup run was ended by Italy's Internazionale, who defeated them 2–0 over two legs. Mike Walker's success at Norwich attracted attention and, in January 1994, he left the club to take charge of Everton. Walker's replacement was first team coach John Deehan, who was assisted by Gary Megson, then still a player. Deehan led the club to 12th place in the 1993–94 season in the Premier League.

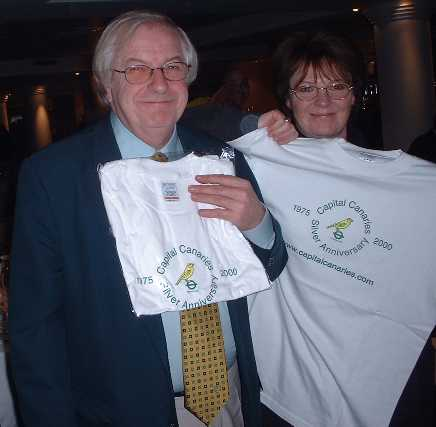
Michael Wynn-Jones and Delia Smith at a fans' event

During the 1994 close season, the club sold 21-year-old striker Chris Sutton to Blackburn Rovers for a then British record fee of £5 million. By Christmas 1994, Norwich City were seventh in the Premiership and were therefore challenging for a return to the UEFA Cup. But, following a serious injury to goalkeeper Bryan Gunn, the club's performance nosedived; with just one win in their final 20 Premiership fixtures, Norwich plummeted to 20th place and were relegated to the second tier of English football. Deehan resigned just before relegation was confirmed and his deputy, Megson, took over as temporary manager until the end of the season. Martin O'Neill, who had taken Wycombe Wanderers from the Conference to the Second Division with successive promotions, was appointed as Norwich City manager in mid-1995. He lasted just six months in the job before resigning after a dispute with chairman Robert Chase over Chase's refusal to permit O'Neill to spend significant sums on strengthening the squad. Soon after O'Neill's resignation, Chase stepped down after protests from supporters, who complained that he kept selling the club's best players and was to blame for the relegation. Between 1992 and January 1995, Norwich had disposed of several key attacking players: Robert Fleck (for £2.1M), Ruel Fox (for £2.25M), Chris Sutton (for £5M), Efan Ekoku (£0.9M) and Mark Robins (£1M). (Note: Names are listed in date order of transfer from the club.) Nearly 40 years after being instrumental in saving the club from bankruptcy, Geoffrey Watling bought Chase's majority shareholding. Gary Megson was appointed Norwich manager on a temporary basis for the second time in eight months. Megson remained in charge until the end of the season before leaving the club. Just four seasons after finishing third in the Premiership and beating Bayern Munich in the UEFA Cup, Norwich had finished 16th in Division One.

English television cook Delia Smith and her husband Michael Wynn-Jones took over the majority of Norwich City's shares from Watling in 1996, and Mike Walker was re-appointed as the club's manager. He was unable to repeat the success achieved during his first spell and was sacked two seasons later with Norwich mid-table in the First Division. His successor Bruce Rioch lasted two seasons and departed in mid-2000, with promotion yet to be achieved.

== New millennium and centenary: 2000–today ==
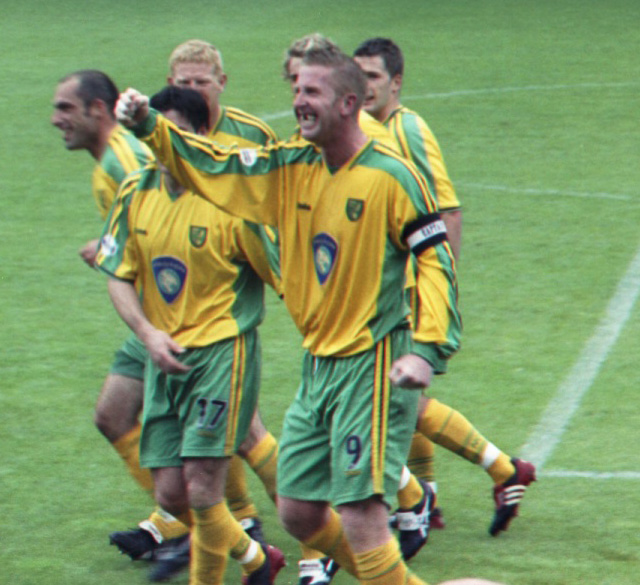
Iwan Roberts scored 84 goals for Norwich in a space of seven years around the turn of the millennium.

Rioch's successor, Bryan Hamilton, lasted in the job for six months before he resigned with the club 20th in the First Division, and in real danger of relegation to the third tier of English football for the first time since the 1960s. The new appointee was Nigel Worthington, who had been Hamilton's assistant manager. Worthington's time as Norwich manager was one of peaks and troughs, with mid-table comfort a rarity. In his first part-season, he successfully steered the team away from the threat of relegation. The following season, Norwich exceeded expectations and reached the 2002 play-off final, losing to Birmingham City on penalties.

Norwich City celebrated its centenary in 2002. Among the celebrations and events was an initiative to create a Hall of Fame, to honour players, coaches, managers, directors and executives who have "made the greatest contribution to the club in its long history both on and off the pitch". Initially, 100 significant figures from the club's history were honoured; 25 were nominated by the club and a further 75 were subsequently chosen by a fan vote. A further 10 members were inducted in 2006, elected by the club's supporters.

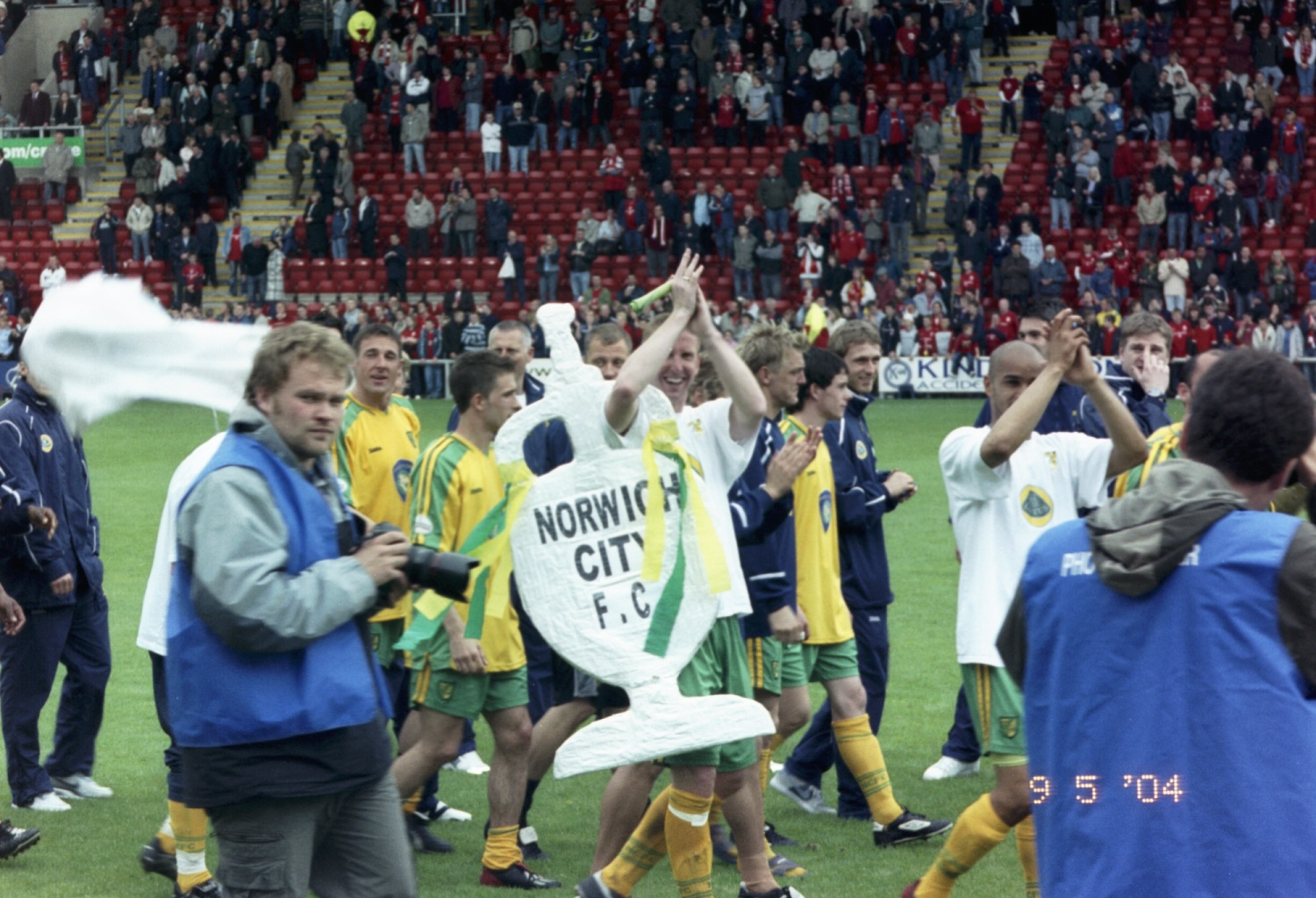
Norwich City players celebrate winning the First Division Championship in 2004.

After a season of consolidation, in 2003–04 Worthington led the club to the First Division title, a success achieved by a margin of eight points and Norwich returned to the top flight for the first time in nine years. For much of the 2004–05 season, the club struggled in the Premiership, but the team staged a remarkable comeback in the final weeks of the season: Norwich, who had not won in months, secured 13 points out of 18. On the last day of the season, the club needed a win to ensure top flight football the following season, but a 6–0 away defeat to Fulham condemned them to relegation.

The club was expected to make a quick return to the Premiership in the 2005–06 season, but a terrible first four months to the campaign saw City fall as low as 18th in The Championship and "the fans started to turn on Nigel Worthington". Dean Ashton was sold for a club-record £7million, approximately double what they had paid just one year earlier. Half of Ashton's fee was immediately reinvested in the purchase of Welsh striker Robert Earnshaw, who helped the Canaries' revival to a ninth-place finish. Worthington made just one permanent signing in the close season, and when a poor run of form ensued, leaving the club in 17th place in the Championship, he was dismissed. First team coach Martin Hunter acted as caretaker manager for a fortnight before former City player Peter Grant left West Ham United to become the new manager.

Grant managed to lift the side to finish 16th in the league. During the 2007 close season, Grant brought in nine players; (Note: Including two, Jamie Cureton and Darel Russell, who were former Norwich players) ten players, including Earnshaw, departed and Darren Huckerby criticised the club for selling their best players. When the 2007–08 season opened with only two Norwich wins by early October, Grant left the club by "mutual consent". On 30 October, former Newcastle United boss Glenn Roeder was confirmed as the new manager. Roeder released several players, largely replacing them with inexperienced loan signings. Results improved enormously, lifting the club from five points adrift at the foot of the table to a comfortable mid-table position. Following a poor first half of the 2008–09 campaign, Roeder was dismissed in January 2009.

The appointment of the club's "legendary former goalkeeper", Bryan Gunn, as manager did not prevent relegation to the third tier of English league football (League One), a level the club had not played at since 1960. Norwich started their League One campaign at home to fellow East Anglians Colchester United. They were widely expected to return swiftly to the Championship, but suffered a shock 1–7 defeat, the worst home defeat in their 107-year history. Gunn was sacked six days later. The club moved swiftly to appoint the man who had masterminded the downfall of Gunn, Colchester manager Paul Lambert.

Lambert oversaw a turnaround in fortunes to lead Norwich to promotion back to The Championship as League One champions, during a season that included a 16-game unbeaten run. The following season, two victories in the Old Farm derby over Ipswich Town, were part of a season in which Norwich finished runners-up and returned to the Premier League following a six-year absence.

The club finished in 12th place in their first season back in the Premier League but Lambert resigned within a month of the season's close. He was replaced by Chris Hughton for the 2012–13 season. Hughton's reign started poorly, but the bad run of form was followed by a club record unbeaten run in the Premier League and Norwich secured their third consecutive year in the Premier League. A 1–0 home defeat to Luton Town that season resulted in Norwich becoming the first English top-flight team to lose a FA Cup tie to a non-league side in 24 years.

At the end of the 2013–14 season, Hughton's second as manager, shortly before Norwich were relegated back to the Championship, Hughton was replaced by former Norwich player Neil Adams. After a mediocre first half of the 2014–15 season, Adams resigned and Hamilton Academical manager Alex Neil was appointed in January 2015; at 33 years old, he was the second youngest manager in the Football League. The appointment reinvigorated Norwich's season and after narrowly missing out on automatic promotion back to the Premier League, victory in the 2015 Championship playoff final secured an immediate return to the top division of English football. During the 2015–16 season, former Shadow Chancellor Ed Balls was appointed chairman. At the end of that season, Norwich were relegated once more, to play in the 2016–17 EFL Championship. When it became clear that the club would not be promoted, Neil left his post and was replaced in May 2017 by German coach, Daniel Farke, on a two-year contract.

In 2017/18, Farke's first season in charge saw Norwich finish in 14th place in the 2017–18 EFL Championship table. The 2018–19 season saw Norwich City promoted back to the Premier League, winning the title on the final day with a 2–1 win over Aston Villa at Villa Park. However, Norwich's stay in the Premier League was brief and the club were relegated a year later, finishing bottom and amassing just 21 points. They did reach the quarter-finals of the FA Cup after defeating Tottenham in a penalty shoot-out at the Tottenham Hotspur Stadium, but then exited the competition following defeat to Manchester United who triumphed 2‍–‍1 after extra time at Carrow Road.

In the 2020-21 season, Norwich won the second tier title for the second time in three seasons. They sealed the title by defeating Reading 4‍–‍1 at Carrow Road. Much of the season had seen matches across The Championship played behind closed doors due to restrictions imposed by the UK government in response to the COVID-19 pandemic. In the summer transfer window, Norwich's most expensive purchases were Milot Rashica and Christos Tzolis, however they also sold Emi Buendia to Aston Villa for a club record £33m. On 6 November 2021, Norwich sacked manager Daniel Farke immediately after the club recorded their first win of the season away at Brentford. Dean Smith was announced as the new manager on 15 November 2021. The change of manager was to no avail as Norwich were relegated after a 2‍–‍0 defeat at Villa Park on 30 April 2022.

Norwich sacked Dean Smith on 27 December 2022 after a run of three wins in thirteen matches. David Wagner was appointed as the new head coach on 6 January 2023. In his first full season in charge, Norwich reached the championship play-offs at the end of the 2023-24 season, but were eliminated 4‍–‍0 on aggregate by Leeds United after the first leg finished in a stalemate at Carrow Road. Wagner was sacked the next day. During that season, Ben Knapper replaced Stuart Webber as sporting director. On 30 May 2024, Johannes Hoff Thorup was unveiled as the new manager ahead of the 2024-25 season. He signed a three-year contract. Thorup was sacked on 22 April 2025 with two matches of the season remaining. He had lost six of his previous eight fixtures in charge.

On 3 June 2025, Norwich appointed Liam Manning as their new manager on a four-year contract. Manning moved from Bristol City and became the first person from Norwich to manage the club. Marcelino Núñez was sold to Ipswich in the summer transfer window for a fee potentially rising to £10m, with the transfer causing discontent amongst the club's fanbase. Norwich's sixteen year unbeaten run against local rivals Ipswich ended on 5 October 2025 with a 3‍–‍1 defeat at Portman Road. Following a 2‍–‍1 home defeat against Leicester, and a second-tier record seven consecutive home defeats in the league (eight in all competitions), Manning was sacked on 8 November 2025. The club were 23rd in the league table.

On 18 November 2025, Norwich appointed former Club Brugge and Rangers manager Philippe Clement as their new head coach on a contract until 2029.

The post-millennium period has seen changes to the way the club is run as a business. When a new business management team was appointed at the start of the 2009–10 season, it inherited a business saddled with debt. Substantial work was done to restructure the finances, with a plan for all debt to be repaid within five years. In 2016, the club reported that it was debt-free.
