= Norwich City F.C. in European football =

English club in European football

- Club: Norwich City
- Seasons played: 1
- First entry: 1993–94 UEFA Cup
- Latest entry: 1993–94 UEFA Cup

Norwich City Football Club is an English football club based in Norwich, Norfolk. The club was founded in 1902 and has competed in the English football league system since 1920. Their first and so far only season in UEFA-sanctioned cup competition came when they reached the third round of the UEFA Cup in the 1993–94 season. They also took part in the Texaco Cup and the Anglo-Scottish Cup in the 1970s.

== History ==
=== 1972–73 Texaco Cup ===
Norwich's first taste of European competition was in the Texaco Cup in the 1972–73 season. In the first round, Norwich faced Scottish club Dundee. A 2–1 loss was perhaps not the most auspicious of starts but a 2–0 win in the second leg saw Norwich safely through to the second round, where Norwich were pitted against Leicester City. After a 2–0 home win each and no decider after extra time, Norwich progressed by winning the penalty shoot-out 4–3. In the third round, Norwich played Motherwell and beat them in both legs to set up a contest with local rivals Ipswich Town in the Final. Norwich were beaten in both legs.

Season	Competition	Round	Opposition	Score
1972–73	Texaco Cup	First round	(Scotland) Dundee	2–1 (A), 2–0 (H)
1972–73	Texaco Cup	Second round	(England) Leicester City	2–0 (A), 2–0 (H) (Note: Won 4–3 on penalties)
1972–73	Texaco Cup	Semifinal	(Scotland) Motherwell	2–0 (H), 3–2 (A)
1972–73	Texaco Cup	Final	(England) Ipswich Town	2–1 (A), 1–2 (H)

=== 1973–74 Texaco Cup ===
After being beaten finalists the previous year, Norwich had a second go at the Texaco Cup in the 1973–74 season. Their first round opponents would again hail from Scotland; Perth side St Johnstone. Norwich beat them home and away to get through to the second round, where Norwich would again face Motherwell and just as in the semifinal the year before, overcame them in both legs. They then took on Lancashire club Burnley. The Clarets beat City 5–2 on aggregate to send them out.

Season	Competition	Round	Opposition	Score
1973–74	Texaco Cup	First round	(Scotland) St Johnstone	0–2 (A), 1–0 (H)
1973–74	Texaco Cup	Second round	(Scotland) Motherwell	2–0 (H), 0–1 (A)
1973–74	Texaco Cup	Semifinal	(England) Burnley	2–0 (A), 3–2 (H)

=== 1974–75 Texaco Cup ===
The Texaco Cup format was changed in the 1974–75 season. Group stages were introduced for the English clubs. Each team would play the others in the group once, with only the team finishing top of the group progressing. The four Scottish clubs would join in at the quarter-final stage. Norwich were in Group 1, with Birmingham City, West Bromwich Albion and Peterborough United. Norwich kicked off the tournament with a 2–1 home win against Peterborough, however a 5–1 defeat at the Hawthorns to West Bromwich Albion and a 2–1 loss to Birmingham at their St Andrew's ground meant Norwich finished bottom of their group.

Season	Competition	Round	Opposition	Score
1974–75	Texaco Cup	First round	(England) Peterborough United	2–1 (H)
1974–75	Texaco Cup	First round	(England) West Bromwich Albion	1–5 (A)
1974–75	Texaco Cup	First round	(England) Birmingham City	1–2 (A)

=== 1975–76 Anglo-Scottish Cup ===
After Texaco dropped their sponsorship of the tournament, the Anglo-Scottish Cup was created in the 1975–76 season, using largely the same format as the Texaco Cup the previous year, but with the introduction of a Scottish Qualifier round to select four from eight teams for the quarter-final stage. Norwich were in Group 4 of the English Qualifiers, with Fulham, Chelsea and Bristol City. Norwich only picked up one point - that coming from a 1–1 draw away at Chelsea's Stamford Bridge - and finished bottom of their group. Fulham progressed from Group 4, and went on to be beaten in the final by Middlesbrough.

Season	Competition	Round	Opposition	Score
1975–76	Anglo-Scottish Cup	First round	(England) Fulham	1–2 (H)
1975–76	Anglo-Scottish Cup	First round	(England) Chelsea	1–1 (A)
1975–76	Anglo-Scottish Cup	First round	(England) Bristol City	4–1 (A)

=== 1976–77 Anglo-Scottish Cup ===
In the 1976–77 season of the Anglo-Scottish Cup Norwich were the only non-London club in Group 3: Fulham, Chelsea and Orient provided the opposition. Draws with all three teams saw the Canaries finish second to Orient, who would be beaten in the Final by Nottingham Forest.

Season	Competition	Round	Opposition	Score
1976–77	Anglo-Scottish Cup	First round	(England) Orient	0–0 (H)
1976–77	Anglo-Scottish Cup	First round	(England) Chelsea	1–1 (A)
1976–77	Anglo-Scottish Cup	First round	(England) Fulham	1–1 (A)

=== 1977–78 Anglo-Scottish Cup ===
Fulham, Chelsea and Orient would again be Norwich's opposition in the 1977–78 season of the Anglo-Scottish Cup. Draws with Orient and Chelsea either side of a 1–0 defeat at home to Fulham meant that Norwich were eliminated. Fulham progressed, but were knocked out by St Mirren in the first quarterfinal.

Season	Competition	Round	Opposition	Score
1977–78	Anglo-Scottish Cup	First round	(England) Orient	1–1 (H)
1977–78	Anglo-Scottish Cup	First round	(England) Fulham	0–1 (H)
1977–78	Anglo-Scottish Cup	First round	(England) Chelsea	2–2 (A)

=== 1978–79 Anglo-Scottish Cup ===
For the third successive Anglo-Scottish Cup, Norwich and Orient would be pitted against each other in a group that also featured Nottinghamshire clubs Mansfield Town and Notts County. Draws with Mansfield and Orient after a 2–1 away defeat to Notts County saw Norwich again fail to progress past the group stages. This would be the last time Norwich took part in the Anglo-Scottish Cup, which was scrapped after the 1980–81 tournament.

Season	Competition	Round	Opposition	Score
1978–79	Anglo-Scottish Cup	First round	(England) Notts County	2–1 (A)
1978–79	Anglo-Scottish Cup	First round	(England) Mansfield Town	1–1 (H)
1978–79	Anglo-Scottish Cup	First round	(England) Orient	0–0 (H)

=== 1985–91 ===
Norwich won the 1984–85 Football League Cup, giving them a place in the 1985–86 UEFA Cup. However, English clubs were banned from taking part in European competition in the aftermath of the Heysel Stadium disaster. As a compromise, the Football League Super Cup was created, with the clubs that would have taken part in European competition that year (league champions Everton, FA Cup winners Manchester United, and fellow UEFA Cup qualifiers Liverpool, Southampton and Tottenham Hotspur) participating. Norwich were placed in Group 1 with Everton and Manchester United. A home win and an away loss against Everton and two draws against Manchester United saw Norwich progress with Everton to the semifinals, where they faced Liverpool. A 1–1 home draw in the first leg and 3–1 away defeat sealed Norwich's elimination, and Liverpool carried on to face Everton in a Merseyside derby in the Final, which Liverpool won 7–2 on aggregate. The Super Cup was never held again, and was ostensibly replaced by the Full Members Cup.

Season	Competition	Round	Opposition	Score
1985–86	Super Cup	Group phase	(England) Everton	1–0 (A), 1–0 (H)
1985–86	Super Cup	Group phase	(England) Manchester United	1–1 (A), 1–1 (H)
1985–86	Super Cup	Semi final	(England) Liverpool	1–1 (H), 3–1 (A)

Norwich would be denied places in the UEFA Cup twice more: in 1986–87 Norwich finished fifth. Had the usual rules been in place, the club would join Liverpool, Tottenham and 1986–87 Football League Cup winners Arsenal in the 1987–88 tournament. City's finish of fourth place in the 1988–89 season would ordinarily have secured qualification for the 1989–90 tournament, however the ban was still in force. It remained so until 1990–91, with England not getting back all their allocation of clubs to send to European competition until 1995–96.

=== 1993–94 UEFA Cup ===
The Canaries, managed by Mike Walker, achieved a third-place finish in the 1992–93 season; the first season of the new FA Premier League. It was the club's highest league finish to date, and for much of the season they had been surprise contenders for the league title. Thus, along with Aston Villa, Norwich would represent England in the 1993–94 UEFA Cup. Norwich's first opponents were Vitesse. A 3–0 home win in the first leg and a 0–0 draw away at Nieuw Monnikenhuize were enough to see Norwich through to the second round, where they would face three-time European champions Bayern Munich. A famous 2–1 win at the Olympic Stadium in Munich was followed up with a 1–1 draw at Carrow Road, ensuring that City would progress to the third round. Again Norwich would face a former European Cup winner, this time in the shape of Italian club Inter Milan. The East Anglian club's participation in the competition was ended at this stage as the Nerazzurri ran out one-nil winners in both legs.

Season	Competition	Round	Opposition	Home	Attendance	Away	Attendance	Aggregate
1993–94	UEFA Cup	First round	(Netherlands) Vitesse	3–0	16,818	0–0	9,133	3–0
1993–94	UEFA Cup	Second round	(Germany) Bayern Munich	1–1	20,809	2–1	28,500	3–2
1993–94	UEFA Cup	Third round	(Italy) Inter Milan	0–1	20,805	0–1	30,000	0–2

== Overall record ==
Competition	Pld	W	D	L	GF	GA	GD
Texaco Cup	17	9	0	8	22	25	-3
Anglo-Scottish Cup	12	0	8	4	10	16	-6
Super Cup	6	1	3	2	5	7	-2
UEFA Cup	6	2	2	2	6	4	2
Total	41	12	13	16	43	52	-9
