= Robert Chase (businessman) =

British businessman (1938–2023)

- Born: July 1938
- Died: 3 March 2023 (aged 84)
- Occupation: Businessman
- Known for: Former chairman of Norwich City Football Club

Robert Timothy Chase (July 1938 – 3 March 2023) was an English businessman from Norfolk.

Chase was most notable for being the chairman of football club Norwich City from 1985 to 1996. His tenure coincided with one of the most successful periods in the club's history, but ended acrimoniously. He managed a family construction business for over 40 years from the early 1960s, was a member of Norfolk County Council and chaired the Norfolk Police Authority for four years.

Chase died after a short illness on 3 March 2023, at the age of 85.

== Norwich City chairmanship ==
Chase was elected to the Norwich board in 1982 and became chairman in 1985. He steered Norwich through some of its greatest success, including its first (and to date only) three finishes in the top five of the English league and a notable victory against Bayern Munich in the UEFA Cup.

Chase's time as Norwich chairman ended acrimoniously in April 1996, with fans calling for his departure following a succession of player sales and disappointing results on the field, namely relegation from the Premier League the previous season, just two years after almost winning the league title.

Chase's role at the club was put in the spotlight during Martin O'Neill's brief spell as Norwich manager. O'Neill, who had taken Wycombe Wanderers from the Football Conference to the third tier Division Two with successive promotions, was appointed Norwich City manager in mid-1995. He lasted just six months in the job before resigning after a public dispute with Chase over Chase's refusal to permit O'Neill to spend significant sums on strengthening the squad, despite having received millions of pounds in fees for players sold during the previous few years. Soon after O'Neill's resignation, Chase stepped down after protests from supporters, who complained that he kept selling the club's best players and was to blame for the relegation.

Between 1992 and 1995, Norwich had disposed of several key attacking players: Robert Fleck (for £2.1 million), Ruel Fox (for £2.25 million), Chris Sutton (for £5 million), Efan Ekoku (£900,000) and Mark Robins (£1 million). (Note: Names are listed in date order of transfer from the club.) Nearly 40 years after being instrumental in saving the club from bankruptcy in 1957, Geoffrey Watling bought Chase's majority shareholding in 1996, later selling the shareholding to the club's current owners, Delia Smith and Michael Wynn-Jones.
