= Stuart Webber =

British sporting director

Personal information
- Full name: Stuart Webber
- Date of birth: 15 April 1984 (age 42)
- Place of birth: Aberystwyth, Wales

Managerial career
- Years: Team
- 2002–2009: Wrexham (Head of Youth)
- 2009–2012: Liverpool (Director of Recruitment)
- 2012–2013: Queens Park Rangers (Head of Scouting)
- 2013–2015: Wolverhampton Wanderers (Head of Scouting)
- 2015–2017: Huddersfield Town (Director of Football)
- 2017–2023: Norwich City (Sporting Director)
- 2025-: RB Omiya Ardija (Head of Sports)

Stuart Webber (born 15 April 1984) is a Welsh football director. Webber is currently Head of Sport at Red Bull Omiya in Japan. He was also previously Sporting Director at Norwich City Football Club.

== Career ==
Webber's career in football started when he attended Northop College, Flintshire. As part of a work experience placement he got a job as part of the ground staff at Wrexham. At Wrexham he moved onto coaching the academy, eventually becoming Head of Youth Development.

In July 2009, Webber left Wrexham to become Director of Recruitment at Liverpool working alongside managers like Rafa Benitez and Kenny Dalglish.

In August 2012, Webber left Liverpool to take up a position at Queens Park Rangers as Head of Scouting. before becoming Head of Recruitment in January 2013 at Wolverhampton Wanderers

Webber became Head of Football Operations at Huddersfield Town in June 2015, becoming instrumental in the recruitment of players that got Huddersfield promoted to the Premier League.

In April 2017, he became Sporting Director at Norwich City, and oversaw another promotion to the Premier League.On 13 June 2023, the club announced that Webber had handed in his notice and would be leaving the club within the next twelve months. He officially left his post on 27 November 2023, when Ben Knapper took over his role at the club.

In September 2025, he took up the role of Head of Sports at Japan's RB Omiya Ardija, part of the Red Bull Group.

=== Controversy ===
In May 2022, Webber came under criticism for his role in the relegation of Norwich City from the Premier League at a protest outside of Carrow Road.
