= Thomas Hunt (footballer) =

English footballer

Thomas Hunt was a footballer, born in West Bromwich in 1908 and died in West Bromwich in 1975.

Hunt played as a centre-forward for Norwich City F.C. and scored in nine of his first ten starts.

Hunt played in Norwich's club-record victory, 10–2 over Coventry City, on 15 March 1930, scoring five goals. The half-time score was 4–0, meaning the 8,230 supporters saw eight second half goals

Hunt was the subject of a contractual wrangle between Norwich and Wolverhampton Wanderers, with the latter claiming he was "their" player, on loan at Norwich. "The City Directors and Supporters got together to buy him back but he did not reproduce his early brilliance".

When his playing career ended in 1932, he went on to work in the steel industry.
