= Michael Wynn-Jones =

Welsh publisher and football club owner (1941–2026)

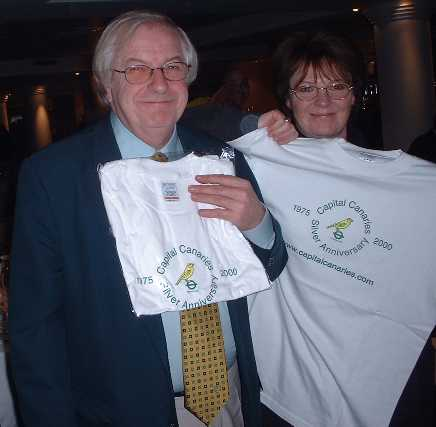
- Wynn Jones with his wife Delia Smith at the 25th anniversary of the "Capital Canaries" in 2000
- Born: Edward Michael Spenser Wynn Jones; 17 September 1941; Pontypridd, Glamorganshire, Wales
- Died: 28 September 2026 (aged 85); Suffolk, England
- Occupation: Writer • editor • publisher
- Spouse: Delia Smith (m. 1971)

Edward Michael Spenser Wynn Jones (17 September 1941 – 28 September 2026), known professionally as Michael Wynn Jones and sometimes spelt Michael Wynn-Jones, was a Welsh writer, editor and publisher. He was an honorary life president of Norwich City Football Club with his wife, the former television cook Delia Smith, and was previously the joint majority shareholder of the club alongside Smith from 1998 to 2024.

== Early life and personal life ==
Wynn Jones was born on 17 September 1941 in Pontypridd, Glamorganshire. He studied at Lancing College and the University of Oxford. His father was a Church of England vicar in Tivetshall and Redenhall with Harleston, and his mother was a teacher at Diss Grammar School. Wynn-Jones married Delia Smith in Stowmarket, Suffolk, in 1971.

== Publishing, editing and writing ==
Wynn Jones established New Crane Publishing, to publish Sainsbury's: The Magazine, when Delia was a consultant for Sainsbury's supermarkets, which also produced some of Smith's books as well as the Sainsbury's magazine, which Wynn Jones edited. In 2005, New Crane Publishing was sold to Seven Publishing for around £7 million.

Wynn Jones was the former deputy editor of the Daily Mirror's midweek colour supplement Mirror Magazine, during which time in 1969 it hired Delia Smith in her first role as a cookery writer. In 1972, George Gale appointed Wynn Jones as deputy editor of The Spectator, and he also worked for the Twentieth Century and Nova magazines.

Wynn Jones also wrote many books, including The Cartoon History of Britain; George Cruikshank: His Life and London; and 100 Years on the Road: A Social History of the Car.

== Norwich City ==
Wynn Jones attended his first Norwich City match in 1953. In 1997 he became the joint majority shareholder of the club with his wife Delia Smith. In Tales From The City, a series of books about the history of the club published in 2015, Wynn Jones says that in 1996 former majority shareholder Geoffrey Watling invited them to make a loan to the club, in exchange for board of directors positions at the club. They later purchased Watling's shares in the club, making them majority shareholders, and in 1998, Wynn Jones and Smith owned 63% of the club's shares. By 2006, their share in the club had reduced to 57%, and in 2015 their share had reduced again to 53%. In 2013, the pair wrote off £2.1 million of debt that the club owed them, as part of a £23 million reduction in the club's deficit; it has been estimated that Wynn Jones and Smith have invested around £12 million into the club since 1996. In the 2015–16 season, Wynn Jones and Smith's estimated worth was reportedly £23 million, the least of any Premier League club owners. Roy Waller wrote of Wynn Jones and Smith that they are "crucial to the club's success", as they invested a lot with "very little return"; Waller noted that Wynn Jones attends every Norwich match, both home and away, and often chose to sit with the fans during matches, rather than being in the directors' box. The couple's 28 years of involvement with Norwich City came to an end in October 2024, when the club's other shareholders approved a deal that allowed Norfolk Holdings, a business group led by the American businessman Mark Attanasio that had purchased a 40.4% stake in the club in April 2024, to increase its stake to 85% and take majority control, with Wynn Jones and Smith's shares decreasing to 10%. As part of the deal, Wynn Jones and Smith also agreed to stand down from their roles as club directors and become honorary life presidents of the club.

== Death ==
Wynn Jones died at home near Stowmarket in Suffolk on 28 September 2026, aged 85.
