= Ben Knapper =

English sporting director

Personal information
- Full name: Ben Knapper
- Date of birth: 1 July 1987 (age 39)
- Place of birth: Macclesfield, England

Team information
- Current team: Norwich City (Sporting Director)

Managerial career
- Years: Team
- 2007–2009: Scunthorpe United (Performance Analyst)
- 2009–2023: Arsenal (Football Analyst)
- 2019–2023: Arsenal (Loans Manager)
- 2023–: Norwich City (Sporting Director)

Ben Knapper is an English football executive who is the current sporting director of EFL Championship club Norwich City. He was previously the loans manager at Arsenal.

== Career ==
In 2008, Knapper graduated from the University of Hull with a degree in Sports Coaching and Performance. In 2007, he was appointed analyst of English second tier side Scunthorpe United.

In 2019, he was appointed loan manager of Arsenal in the English Premier League.

On 6 October 2023, Norwich City announced that Knapper would become the club’s new sporting director on 13 November 2023, replacing the outgoing sporting director Stuart Webber.
