= FC Bayern Munich 1–2 Norwich City F.C. =

Association football match

- Event: 1993–94 UEFA Cup, second round
Bayern Munich	Norwich City
1	2
- Date: 19 October 1993
- Venue: Olympiastadion, Munich
- Referee: Leif Sundell (Sweden)
- Attendance: 28,500

The football match between Bayern Munich and Norwich City was played at the Olympiastadion, Munich, on 19 October 1993 as part of the second round of the 1993–94 UEFA Cup and finished in a 2–1 victory for the English side. Jeremy Goss and Mark Bowen scored for Norwich and Christian Nerlinger replied for Bayern; all three goals were scored in the first half. The opening goal by Goss, a volley from outside the area, is considered the greatest goal in Norwich's history, and the victory the pinnacle of the club's history.

Norwich had qualified for this season's UEFA Cup after finishing third in the inaugural Premier League season, while Bayern had ended their previous campaign in the 1992–93 Bundesliga in second place. This was Norwich's third competitive match in European football, having defeated SBV Vitesse 3–0 on aggregate in the first round. In contrast, Bayern Munich were playing their 185th European cup tie and had progressed to the second round with a 7–3 aggregate victory over FC Twente.

The result was a huge upset in European football; it was the only victory by a British club against Bayern Munich in their Olympiastadion. That it was Norwich that inflicted the defeat was startling: Norwich were "mere babes at this level" and, according to Goss, "there's no doubt Bayern assumed it would be easy". German sports magazine Kicker was critical of Bayern's approach to the match.

The second leg was played on 3 November 1993 and ended in a 1–1 draw, meaning that Norwich won the tie 3–2 on aggregate. They went on to be defeated by eventual champions Internazionale 2–0 over the two legs in the third round. Norwich ended their domestic season in 12th place in the Premier League, while Bayern Munich won the Bundesliga, one point ahead of Kaiserslautern.

== Background ==
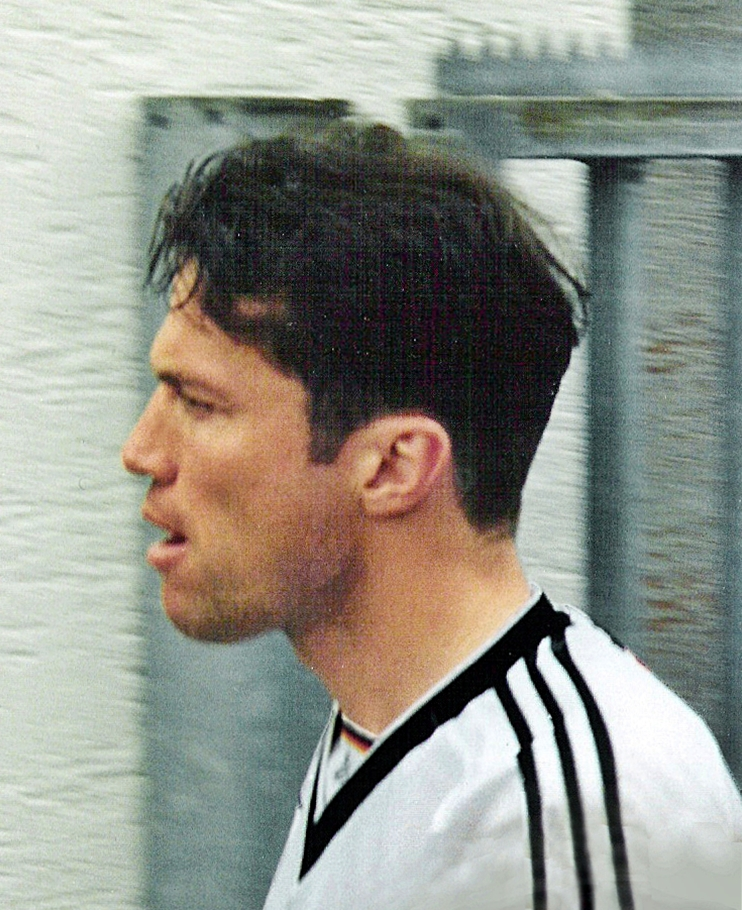
Norwich manager Walker targeted World-Cup winner Lothar Matthäus (pictured) as an unlikely weak link in the Bayern Munich team.

The UEFA Cup was an annual football club competition organised by UEFA between 1971 and 2009, for eligible European football clubs. Clubs qualified for the competition based on their performance in their national leagues and cup competitions. Until a format change in 1990, it was the second-tier competition of European club football, ranking below the UEFA Champions League. The 1993–94 UEFA Cup was played as a knockout tournament; in each round teams contested two-legged ties, from which the team who scored the most goals across the two matches progressed to the next round.

This was Norwich City's first (and as of 2025, only) European campaign, (Note: Norwich City had qualified for the 1985–86 UEFA Cup after winning the 1985 Football League Cup Final but were prevented from competing after English clubs were banned from European football following the Heysel Stadium disaster.) achieved by virtue of finishing in third place in the 1992–93 FA Premier League, the competition's inaugural season, their highest-ever placing in the English football league system. The European campaign capped Norwich City's "great success" in the early 1990s. They had defeated Arnhem in the first round, winning 3–0 at home and drawing 0–0 at the Monnikenhuize in Arnhem. Going into the match, Norwich were in second place in the 1993–94 FA Premier League, seven points behind Manchester United and ahead of third-placed Arsenal on goal difference. The club were on an unbeaten run of nine matches in all competitions.

By contrast, Bayern were regular competitors in European tournaments. The club had, at the time of the tie, won four European trophies, as well as twelve Bundesliga titles, and a host of domestic cups, and this was their 185th tie in European football. They had finished the previous domestic season in second place, one point behind Werder Bremen, and qualified for the UEFA Cup. Prior to this match, they were third in the 1993–94 Bundesliga, four points behind league leaders Eintracht Frankfurt. Bayern had lost two of their twelve matches so far that season, and went into the UEFA Cup tie having won their last three matches, scoring eleven goals and conceding one. They had progressed to the second round having defeated Dutch club FC Twente 7–3 on aggregate with a 4–3 win at Diekman Stadion and a 3–0 victory in the Olympiastadion (Olympic Stadium).

The apparent mismatch between the sides led to an expectation of an overwhelming Munich victory. The father of the Norwich striker Chris Sutton, Mike, later said: "I remember Alan McInally predicting that Bayern were going to win by about ten." In The Times, columnist Martin Samuel summarised the situation: "The Germans had never lost at home to an English side and Norwich's expedition was regarded as little more than an exotic day out with a football match attached". Liverpool, Everton, Tottenham Hotspur, Leeds United and Coventry City had all failed to beat Bayern at the Olympiastadion. This perception, which could not help but reach the players, was to be significant. According to Norwich player, Jeremy Goss, before the match, "everyone around us was saying we would do well to keep it down to three or four nil".

In the days leading up to the match, Norwich manager, Mike Walker, remained resolutely optimistic. Samuel observed: "Clearly nobody had alerted Walker to the doomed nature of his mission ... the day before the game he was telling anybody who would listen that he fancied it". Walker had focused his attention on an unlikely weak link in Munich's team: Lothar Matthäus was the captain of Germany, a player with a distinguished pedigree in European football. He had won most of the major honours available to him, including the 1990 FIFA World Cup, the Ballon d'Or, and the FIFA World Player of the Year. In 1993, Matthäus was 32 years old and no longer playing in the position of midfield in which he had enjoyed so much success for club and country, instead operating for Munich as a sweeper. Samuel noted that "with the bravado of a European novice it was Walker's opinion that ... [Matthäus] wasn't good enough. Delightfully, he was right". Trevor Haylett of The Independent assessed Norwich's tactics as follows: "Walker has introduced a sweeper system and given it a positive face. Three defenders patrol the spaces in front of Ian Culverhouse while Mark Bowen advances to add his control and passing ability to the forward momentum".

== Match ==
=== Pre-match ===
Norwich had injury doubts over two of their players; defender John Polston and striker Efan Ekoku, who had scored seven goals to that point in the season; both ultimately missed the match. Those two, along with Ian Culverhouse, Rob Newman, Gary Megson and Ian Crook, had all been booked in the previous match against Vitesse Arnhem, meaning that a booking in this match would have ruled them out for the return leg. For Bayern, Markus Schupp was suspended after receiving two yellow cards in the previous round against FC Twente, but Olaf Thon who had been injured for six weeks declared himself fit.

A feeling that the German side was arrogantly expecting victory was picked up on by the Norwich team. Bryan Gunn recalls: "It was disappointing that the Bayern management didn't show us any respect, there was an air of arrogance about them. We used that as a stimulus." Despite this feeling, Uli Hoeneß, the Bayern general manager, had been cautious in his words to the German media before the match, telling Kicker that Norwich were a top team, especially away from home. In Frankfurter Allgemeine Zeitung, Rainer Seele pointed to Norwich's away record as a cause for concern for Bayern; they were the Premier League's strongest team having not lost a league match on their travels so far that season.

=== First half ===
The match kicked off at around 20:45 CET in front of a crowd of 28,500 at Munich's Olympiastadion. Bayern Munich immediately went on the attack: in the second minute, a cross from Christian Ziege on the left wing found Marcel Witeczek at the near post, whose first-time shot went narrowly wide. The German side continued to control play for much of the opening ten minutes, patiently searching for a way through the Norwich defence. For their part, Norwich were content to pass the ball around and look for chances to counter-attack. Twelve minutes into the match, after winning a free kick when Mark Robins was injured, Norwich attacked. Newman's floated cross was headed away weakly by Matthäus, towards the edge of the Bayern Munich penalty area. It fell straight into the path of Jeremy Goss whose volley from 20 yards (18 m) went past Raimond Aumann in the Bayern goal, and put the English team 1–0 ahead.

Fifteen minutes in, the injured Robins was replaced by Daryl Sutch, who took up a position in midfield. Bayern went back on the attack, but Adolfo Valencia was repelled by the Norwich defence. Sutch had another chance for Norwich, getting away from Matthäus, and shooting at the near post, where it was pushed away for a corner by Aumann. After 30 minutes, Crook knocked a free kick from the halfway line towards the back post. Sutton and Oliver Kreuzer jumped for the ball, which floated over their heads. Stealing in behind both of them, Bowen met the ball with a stooping header, which flew past Aumann, giving Norwich a two-goal lead. John Motson, who was commentating on the match for the BBC, said "This is almost fantasy football!" Norwich continued to effectively deal with the pressure exerted by Bayern Munich; they frequently had every player except for Sutton behind the ball. In the 40th minute, Munich broke through when a cross from Jorginho on the right wing was met by a jumping Christian Nerlinger, who beat Spencer Prior to the ball and successfully steered his header inside Gunn's left hand post to halve the deficit. At half-time, the score was 2–1 to Norwich.

=== Second half ===
Bayern maintained their patient passing game, but increased the tempo of the match in the second half. After eight minutes, Valencia had another chance, turning six yards from Norwich's goal, but his shot was saved by Gunn. A foul by Goss on Scholl resulted in a free kick to Bayern on the outside of the penalty area, which Matthäus struck over the crossbar. Norwich made some attacks of their own, winning two corners, but they could not take advantage of either. After a late tackle by one of the Bayern players, which caught Sutton high on his right shin, Norwich's discipline broke temporarily when Butterworth retaliated shortly after with a two-footed tackle, earning him a yellow card. Bayern Munich made two changes; Michael Sternkopf replaced Ziege in the 60th minute, and five minutes later Mehmet Scholl was substituted for Bruno Labbadia; tactically, Matthäus pushed further forward from his deep-lying role. After 75 minutes, Jorginho crossed the ball from the right, and Valencia aimed a powerful close-ranger header at goal, drawing a save that The Independent's Trevor Haylett described as "breathtaking" from Gunn. In his autobiography, Gunn says he saved it with his "goolies", adding "it doesn't matter how you keep them out, just as long as you keep them out", rating it the most important save of his career. Kreuzer got to the rebound, but his shot went over the crossbar. Bayern continued to attack; Valencia had another chance in the 78th minute, an overhead kick that he put wide, and within a minute Gunn had to make a save from Matthäus. Gunn was again called into action in injury time, diving at the feet of Labbadia, to ensure that Norwich won the match 2–1.

=== Details ===
19 October 1993
20:45 CET (UTC+1)

Bayern Munich	1–2	Norwich City
Nerlinger 41'	Report	Goss 12'; Bowen 30'

Olympiastadion, Munich
Attendance: 28,500
Referee: Leif Sundell (Sweden)

Bayern Munich	Norwich City

GK	1	(Germany) Raimond Aumann (c)
SW	10	(Germany) Lothar Matthäus
CB	4	(Germany) Oliver Kreuzer
CB	5	(Germany) Thomas Helmer
RWB	2	(Brazil) Jorginho
LWB	3	(Germany) Christian Ziege	(substituted off) 60'
CM	6	(Germany) Christian Nerlinger
CM	7	(Netherlands) Jan Wouters
AM	11	(Germany) Mehmet Scholl	(substituted off) 65'
CF	8	(Germany) Marcel Witeczek
CF	9	(Colombia) Adolfo Valencia
Substitutes:
GK	12	(Germany) Uwe Gospodarek
MF	13	(Germany) Michael Sternkopf	(substituted on) 60'
MF	14	(Germany) Olaf Thon
FW	15	(Germany) Bruno Labbadia	(substituted on) 65'
FW	16	(Germany) Alexander Zickler
Manager:
(Germany) Erich Ribbeck

GK	1	(Scotland) Bryan Gunn
SW	2	(England) Ian Culverhouse
CB	5	(England) Spencer Prior
CB	4	(England) Ian Butterworth (c)	(yellow card) 56'
CB	6	(England) Rob Newman
RM	10	(England) Ruel Fox
CM	8	(England) Ian Crook
CM	11	(Wales) Jeremy Goss
LM	3	(Wales) Mark Bowen
CF	7	(England) Mark Robins		(substituted off) 15'
CF	9	(England) Chris Sutton
Substitutes:
GK	13	(Scotland) Scott Howie
MF	12	(England) Gary Megson
MF	14	(England) Daryl Sutch		(substituted on) 15'
MF	15	(England) Darren Eadie
MF	16	(England) Andy Johnson
Manager:
(Wales) Mike Walker

Assistant referees:
Mikael Hansson (Sweden)

Match rules

- 90 minutes.
- Five named substitutes.
- Maximum of two substitutions.

== Post-match ==
=== Reactions ===
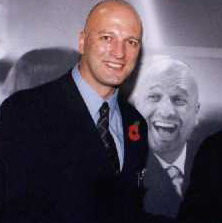
Gunn's late saves helped preserve his side's lead.

When the final whistle blew, Walker gave his team hugs on the pitch, but warned them that they had "a tough game still to come at Carrow Road". The British media were less guarded: "'Jerry sinks the Gerrys' was the inevitable headlined salute to Jerry Goss, Norwich's longest servant". Other headlines included "Canaries ready for the kill", "Norwich shock Bayern Munich" and "Canaries stun Bayern with sensational win". (Note: The "Canaries" is Norwich City F.C.'s nickname.) Goss opined of his goal: "I didn't have to adjust my stride, I just hit it on the volley with my right foot. It was as sweet as anything". Reflecting on the improbability of such a result, FourFourTwo wrote, "The news that Norwich had gone 2–0 up in the Olympic Stadium seemed frankly surreal". That it was Norwich that inflicted the defeat was startling: Norwich were "mere babes at this level", and, according to Goss, "There's no doubt Bayern assumed it would be easy". When analysing the reasons for the result, The Independent laid the blame for the Germans' defeat on their attitude—which was blatant: "They paid the price of underestimating the opposition while embarrassment for one official was total after saying on the eve of the game, and in Walker's hearing, that they wanted a trip to Tenerife in the third round.

In Germany, Kicker's analysis of the defeat was critical of Bayern's tactics. It suggested that after the first goal, Norwich played very deep and Bayern should have played through the wings more and shot more often. It also noted that Ziege was replaced when he was playing well, Helmer had not helped Sternkopf and Labbadia should have been brought on sooner, something the Bayern fans called for by chanting "We want Bruno". Kicker also praised Norwich's tactics and discipline.

Jeremy Goss has written of the reaction of the German players to the first leg defeat: they openly criticised Norwich, with Matthäus playing the lead role, saying that "Norwich was a nothing, little city where the people just ate mustard", a reference to Norwich as the home of Colman's mustard. Goss described it as "not a good idea ... [the] sort of thing that does a manager's team talk for him".

=== Second leg ===
The return leg was played on 3 November 1993 at Carrow Road, a game in which Norwich's Ade Akinbiyi made his debut in front of a crowd of 20,643. Already acknowledged as a club hero, some fans attended the match wearing Goss wigs and t-shirts imprinted with "Gossy". Gunn noted that Goss had been nicknamed "God" for "scoring such vital goals. He has been at the club for ten years and at last he is getting the recognition he deserves."

Valencia scored a goal after four minutes to bring the aggregate score to 2–2. On 50 minutes, Bowen's cross was headed on by Sutton to Goss, who scored. Gunn made saves from Jorginho, Ziege and Witeczek but no further goals were scored. Norwich thus won the tie 3–2 on aggregate and qualified to face Internazionale in the third round. Norwich lost the first leg 1–0 at Carrow Road after Dennis Bergkamp scored an 80th-minute penalty, while the second leg at the San Siro also ended 1–0, again with a late winner from Bergkamp. After beating Norwich 2–0 on aggregate, Internazionale went on to win the tournament.

=== Legacy ===
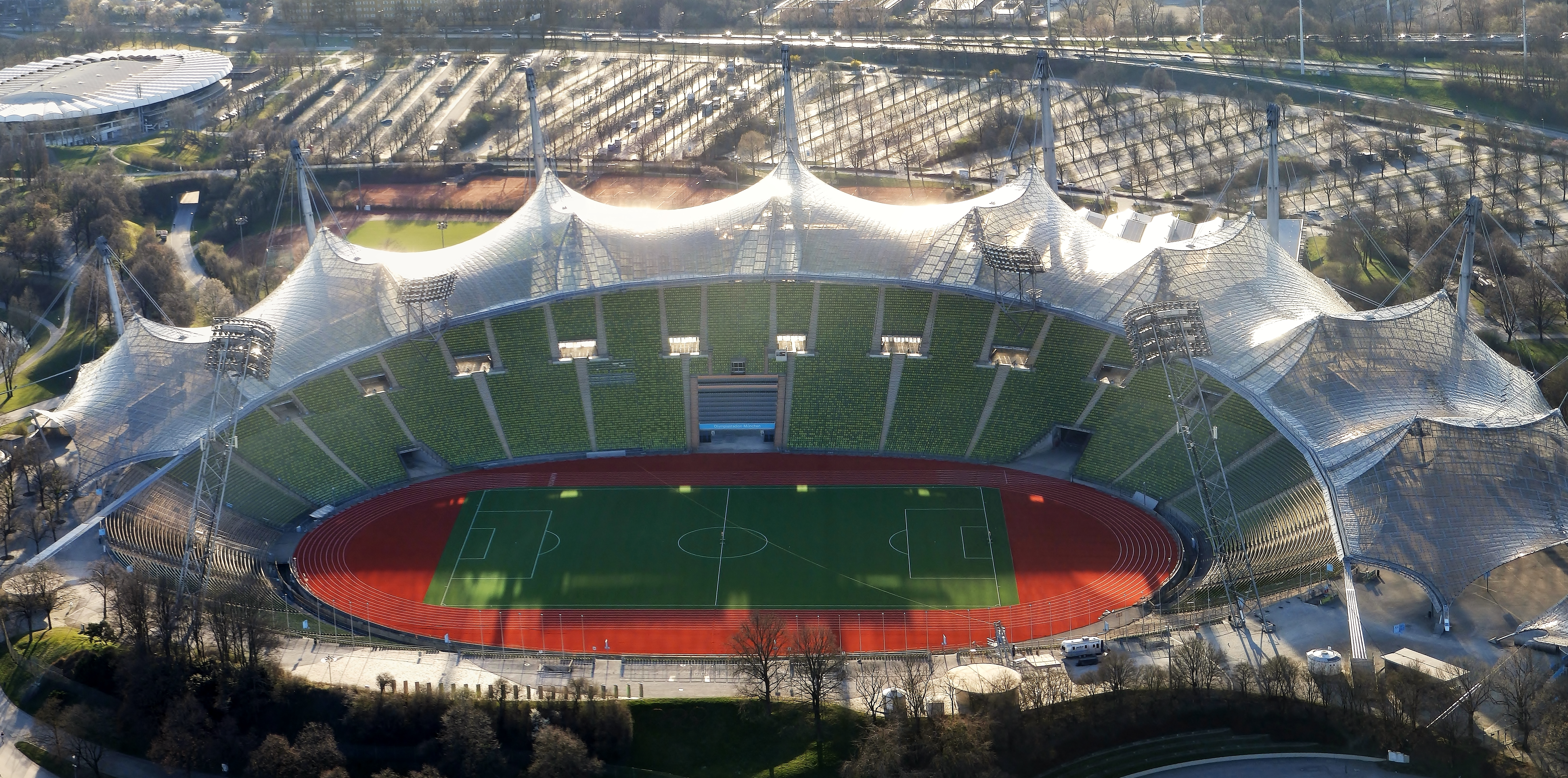
This was the first and only time Bayern Munich was defeated by a British club in the Olympiastadion.

The match has achieved considerable notability in the history of Norwich City, described as "arguably their finest hour" by the BBC, while The Daily Telegraph called it "their finest performance". John Motson commented that the match marked "the rise of Norwich City from provincial respectability to European admiration. It was the refreshing impact of loyal, unsung players ... that made City's continental capers so appealing". In 2008, a poll, conducted by Norwich City recognised Goss's first leg goal as the greatest Norwich goal of all time. In 2013, the club released a commemorative video to commemorate the match's twentieth anniversary.

The match was the only time a British side beat Bayern in a game played in the Olympiastadion. Since moving to their new Allianz Arena in 2005, Bayern have suffered four further defeats against English teams, as of 2020. They lost the final of the 2011–12 UEFA Champions League against Chelsea on penalties after the game finished 1–1 after extra time. Then on 13 March 2013, Bayern lost 2–0 against Arsenal, also in the Champions League, although they progressed to the next round on the away goals rule. Bayern also lost a dead rubber match to Manchester City in the 2013–14 UEFA Champions League group stage. In the 2018–19 UEFA Champions League, Liverpool beat Bayern 3–1 in the Allianz Arena to reach the quarter-finals on their way to clinching their sixth title in the competition.

Norwich ended their domestic season in 12th place in the 1993–94 FA Premier League, and as of 2023, the club have not qualified to play in European competition again. Bayern Munich went on to win the 1993–94 Bundesliga, securing the title by a single point ahead of Kaiserslautern, and have subsequently won four UEFA competitions, including the Champions League in 2001, 2013 and 2020.

== See also ==
- History of Norwich City F.C.
