= Delia's Canary Catering =

Catering company and a subsidiary body of Norwich City F.C

Delia's Canary Catering is a catering company and a subsidiary body of Norwich City F.C.

Created by Delia Smith, the company was created "as a means of increasing revenue into the club on both match and non-match days. Extensive refurbishment of the stands had to be carried out to accommodate new kitchens, restaurants, bars, and hospitality areas."
