= Carrow Road =

Football stadium in Norwich, England

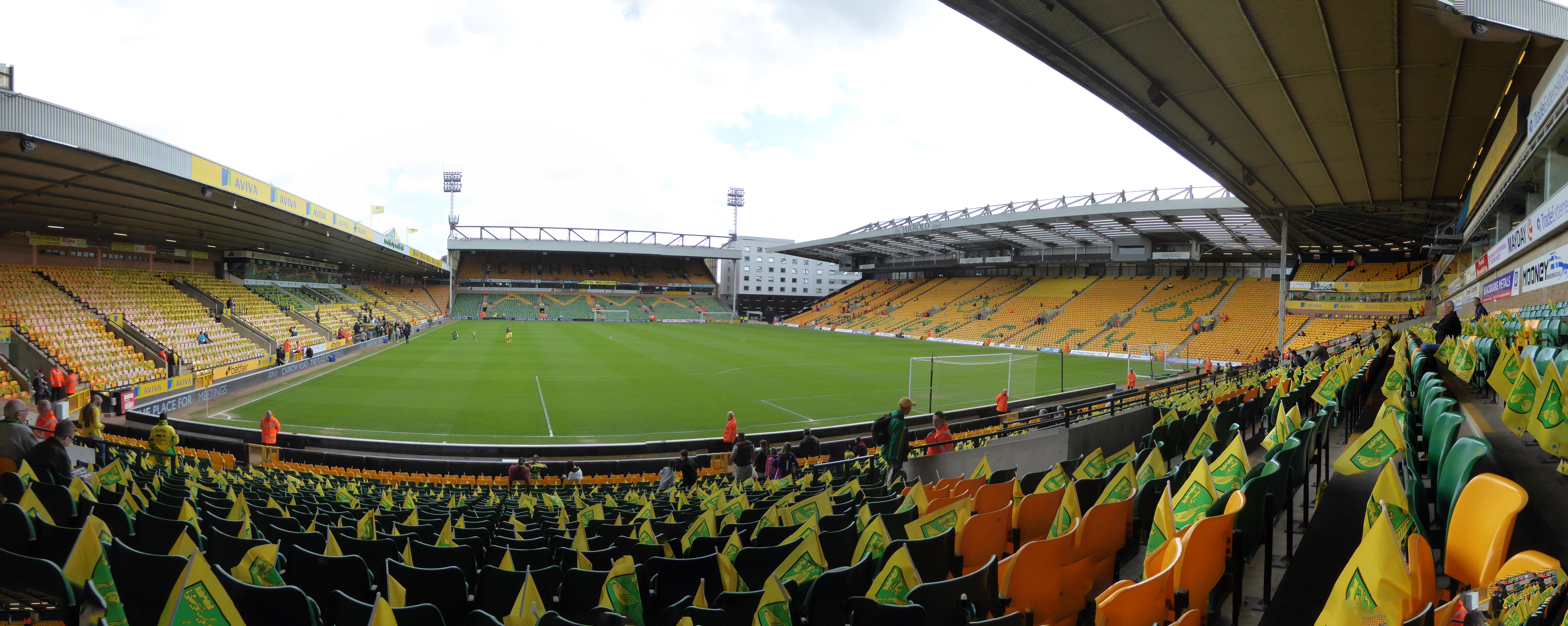
- Carrow Road, looking towards the Barclay stand

- Location of Carrow Road Carrow Road (Europe)
- Full name: Carrow Road Stadium
- Location: Norwich, Norfolk, England
- Coordinates: 52°37′20″N 1°18′33″E
- Capacity: 27,150
- Surface: Desso GrassMaster
- Record attendance: 43,984 (overall); 27,137 (all-seater)
- Field size: 105.2 by 68 m (115.0 by 74.4 yd)

Construction
- Built: 1935
- Opened: 1935
- Expanded: 1979, 1984, 1992, 2004, 2005, 2010

Tenant
- Norwich City (1935–present)

Carrow Road is a football stadium in Norwich, Norfolk, England, and is the home of EFL Championship club Norwich City. The stadium is east of the city, near Norwich railway station and the River Wensum.

Norwich City originally played at Newmarket Road before moving to The Nest. When The Nest was deemed inadequate for the size of crowds it was attracting, the Carrow Road ground, named after the road on which it is located, was purpose-built by Norwich City in just 82 days and opened on 31 August 1935.

The stadium has been altered and upgraded several times during its history, notably following a fire that destroyed the old City Stand in 1984. Having once accommodated standing supporters, the ground was all-seater from 1992 to 2024. Since the start of the 2024/25 season, safe standing has been introduced in both the Lower Barclay and the Snakepit. The ground's current capacity is 27,359. The stadium's record attendance since becoming an all-seater ground is 27,137, set during a Premier League match versus Newcastle United on 2 April 2016. In the days when fans could stand on terraces, Carrow Road saw a crowd of 43,984 when hosting Leicester City for an FA Cup match in 1963.

Carrow Road has also hosted under-21 international football and a number of concerts, including performances by Elton John and George Michael. The Carrow Road site includes catering facilities and a Holiday Inn hotel offering rooms with views of the pitch.

== History ==
=== Background ===
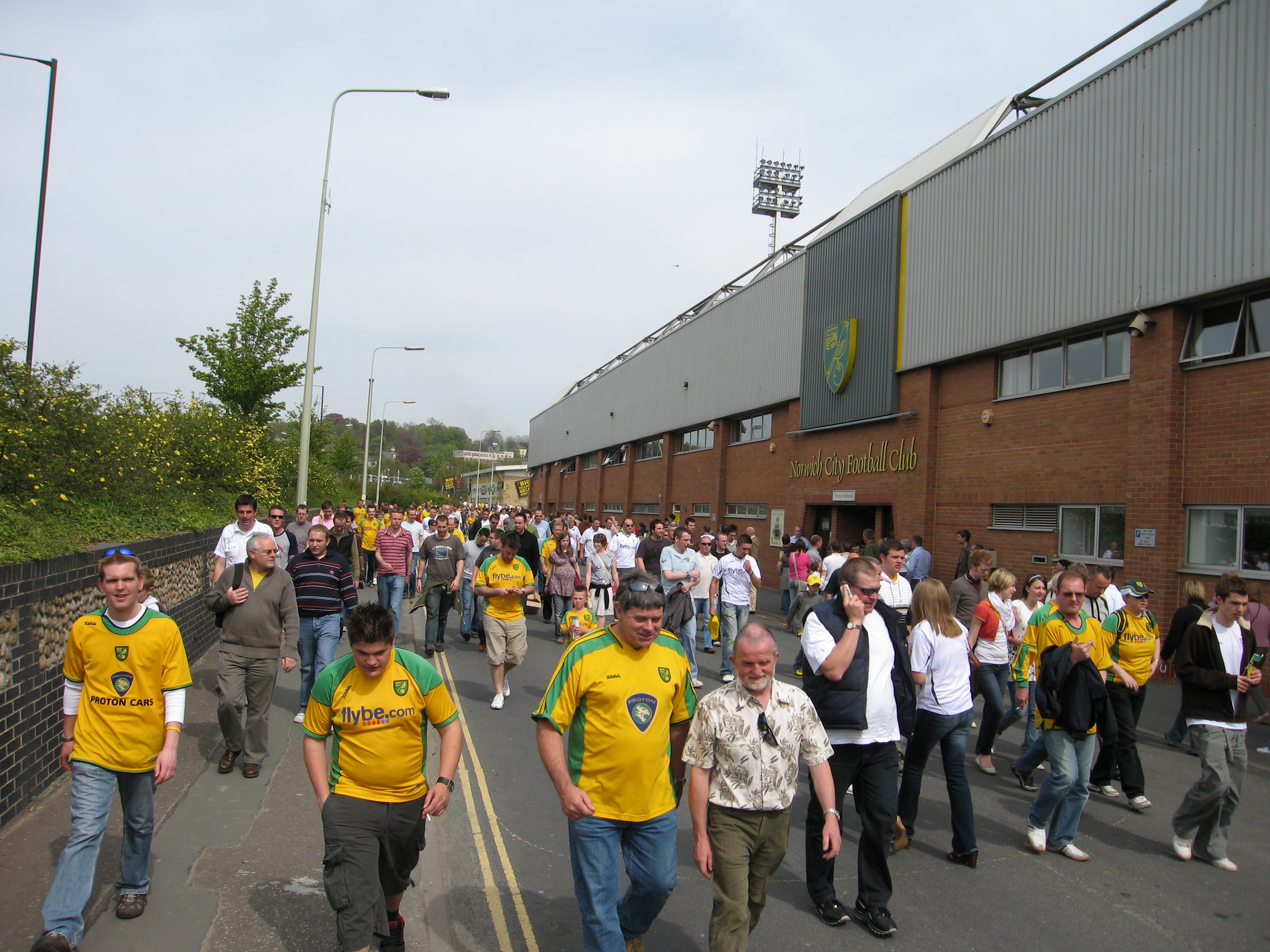
Fans walking along the road from which the stadium takes its name

Norwich City played at Newmarket Road from 1902 to 1908, with a record attendance of 10,366 in 1908. Following a dispute over the conditions of renting Newmarket Road, the club moved to a new home in 1908, a converted disused chalk pit in Rosary Road, Norwich. The new ground became known as The Nest, named for Norwich City's nickname, "The Canaries".

By the 1930s, the ground capacity was proving insufficient for the growing crowds: The Nest's largest crowd was 25,037 in the 1934–35 FA Cup. The physical limitations of the site of The Nest meant that expansion was not possible, and there were safety problems with the existing structures. The club began looking for alternative accommodation in 1926, their hand forced finally when one corner of the pitch subsided up to 30 feet after old chalk workings collapsed. An attempt to patch up the problem with railway sleepers and soil did not satisfy The Football Association (FA), who wrote to the club on 15 May 1935, saying The Nest "was no longer suitable for large crowds and measures must be taken".

The club's dilemma was acute: the FA no longer approved of large crowds at The Nest, but the new season was just weeks away. About half a mile south of The Nest, they found a new site, the Boulton Paul Sports Ground in Carrow Road, which belonged to J. & J. Colman.

=== Stadium's name and initial construction history ===
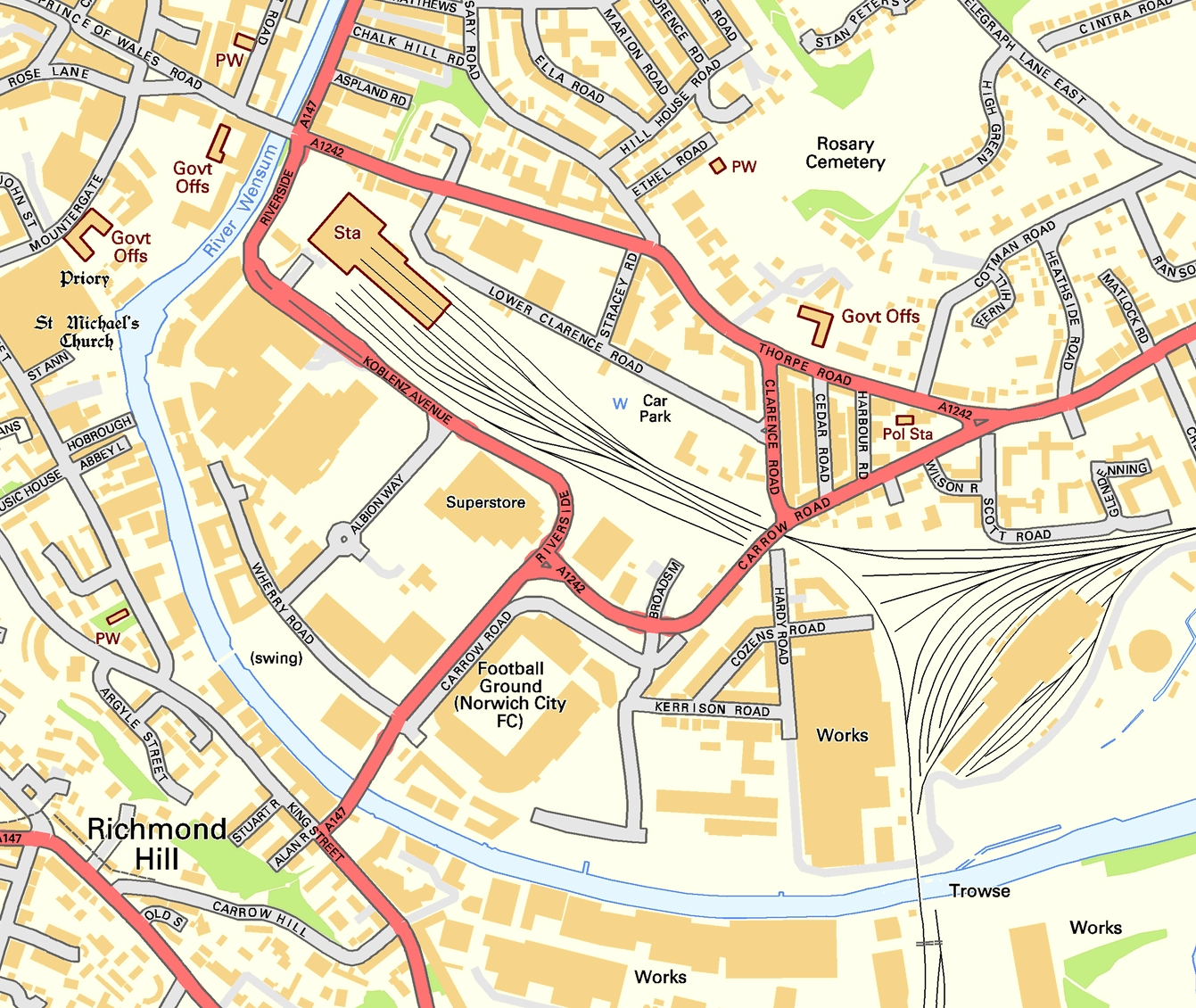
Map, showing how the ground is surrounded by Carrow Road and the River Wensum

The new stadium took its name from the street which encloses the ground on three sides, the fourth boundary being the River Wensum. The name "Carrow" originally refers to the former Carrow Abbey that once stood on the riverside, its name in turn having possible Norse origins. In 1800, John Ridges, owner of the Carrow Abbey Estate and the land opposite on the banks of the Wensum in Thorpe Hamlet, "granted permission for a proposed road access across his grounds to Carrow". By 1811, Philip M. Martineau, a surgeon, owned the building, lands and manor of Carrow, including the adjacent Thorpe land. Carrow Hill Road was created on his Carrow Abbey Estate, to provide work for the poor in the community. The road linked Martineau's Bracondale Estate to Carrow Toll Bridge, installed in 1810. Norwich Railway Co. had acquired the land in Thorpe around Carrow Road by the 1840s, and by 1860 the Thorpe site of the future stadium belonged to the firm of J. & J. Colman. The stadium's Thorpe Corner acknowledges this historical link. In 1935, Colman's offered the 20-year leasehold to Norwich City and construction of the new stadium began swiftly on the site: tenders were issued on the day the site was purchased and ten days later, on 11 June, work began.

Initial materials were sourced by demolishing the former "Chicken Run" section of The Nest, with the rubble dumped as a bank at the river end of the new ground. Thereafter, work proceeded quickly, with most of the stands and terraces built by 17 August. A practice match was held on 26 August with work "still in progress", and, after just 82 days, on 31 August, the ground was opened for a Second Division fixture featuring West Ham United. The stadium had an initial capacity of 35,000, including 5,000 seats under cover. Norwich won the game 4–3; the attendance was 29,779, which set a new club record crowd for a home game. The first competitive goal at the ground was scored by Norwich's Duggie Lochhead.

The new stadium was described by club officials as "the largest construction job in the city since the building of Norwich Castle", "miraculously built in just 82 days" and "the eighth wonder of the world". An aerial photograph from August 1935 shows three sides of open terracing, and a covered stand with a Colman's Mustard advertisement painted on its roof, visible only from the air. The club's association with Colman's has continued into the modern era; in 1997 the club signed a shirt sponsorship deal with the company. The mustard manufacturer's original factory was located adjacent to the stadium in Carrow Road, and the ground was opened by Russell Colman, the President of the club. The author Simon Inglis describes the early Carrow Road as comprising "a Main Stand, a covered end terrace and two large open banks". The covered terrace was paid for by Captain Evelyn Barclay, the vice-president of Norwich City; it was constructed in time for the opening of the 1937–38 season, and while the original stand has since been replaced, the end retains the name of its benefactor.

At this time, the ground's capacity was 38,000, with space for 10,000 of "the more vociferous of the home and away supporters", in the new Barclay end. The new ground received a royal seal of approval: on 29 October 1938, King George VI watched twenty minutes of the home game versus Millwall, the first time a ruling monarch had watched a Second Division match.

=== Ground developments ===
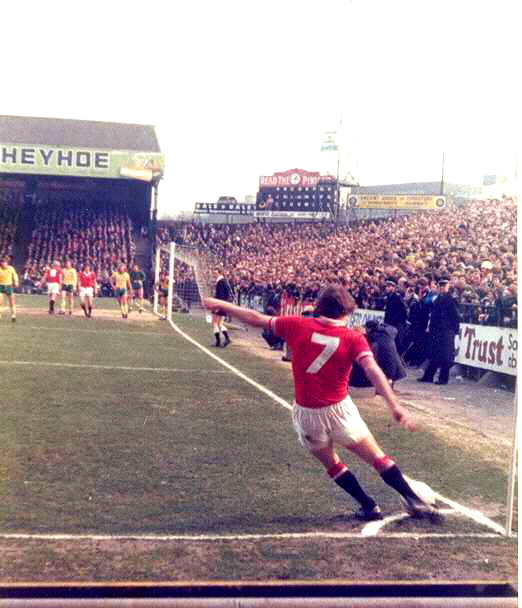
View of the River End terracing (right) and the old South stand in 1979

Floodlights were erected at the ground in 1956 and the £9,000 cost nearly sent the club into bankruptcy. However, Norwich's success in the 1958–59 FA Cup (where as a Third Division club they reached the semi-final, losing to First Division Luton Town after a replay) secured the financial status of the club and provided sufficient funds for a cover to be built over the South Stand. In 1963, the record was set for attendance at Carrow Road: a crowd of 43,984 watched a sixth round FA Cup match against Leicester City, and the South Stand was covered shortly afterwards.

In the wake of the Ibrox stadium disaster in 1971, a government enquiry brought more stringent safety requirements, which, when applied to Carrow Road, resulted in the capacity being drastically reduced to around 20,000. With focus on the dangers of standing, seats began to replace terracing: by 1979, the stadium had a capacity of 28,392, with seats for 12,675. A fire in 1984 partially destroyed one of the stands, which eventually led to its complete demolition and replacement by 1987 with the new City Stand. When it opened, then chairman Robert Chase compared the experience of visiting the new stand to "going to the theatre – the only difference being that our stage is covered with grass".

After the Hillsborough disaster in 1989 and the subsequent outcome of the Taylor Report in 1990, the stadium was converted to all-seater. In 2003 the South Stand was replaced by the new, 8,000-seat Jarrold Stand. In the summer of 2010, work was undertaken to increase the ground's capacity from 26,018 to 27,000. This was achieved by finding additional capacity for seats within the existing stands.

=== Pitch ===
In 2004, £700,000 was invested in improving the pitch. The former all-grass surface was replaced with a sand-based Desso GrassMaster one, the mix of artificial and real grass which, according to the then groundsman Gary Kemp "guarantee[d] that the pitch would be looking good enough for every match to be broadcast on TV". The under-soil heating system "can clear snow and ice within eight hours of being turned on".

=== Eightieth anniversary ===
In anticipation of the ground's 80th anniversary on 31 August 2015, a rematch of the original fixture versus West Ham was played on 28 July. As part of the celebrations, the club offered season ticket holders the opportunity to mark their seats with their name or a message. Fans were also offered the chance to buy tickets for a celebratory dinner with the first-team squad, the menu provided by the club's joint majority shareholder, the celebrity cook Delia Smith.

== Stands ==
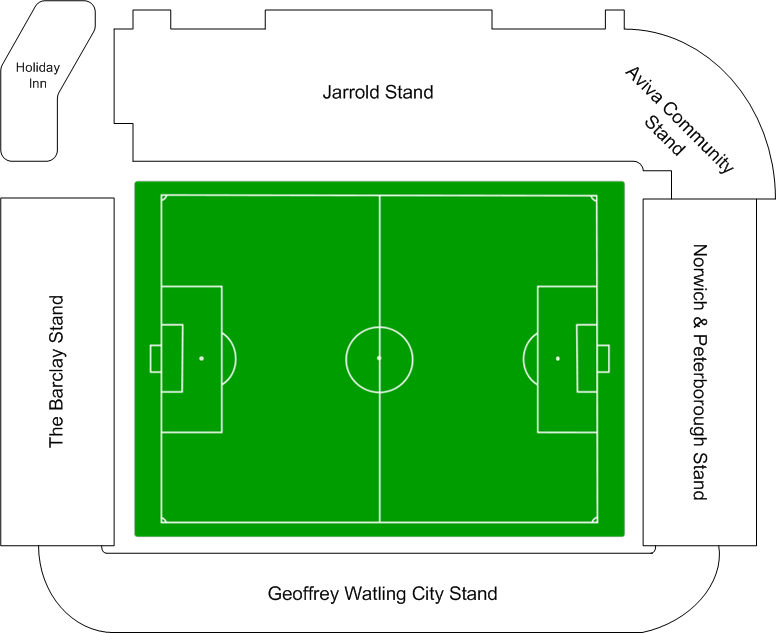
Schematic plan view of Carrow Road's stands

The current stadium consists of four stands; the Regency Security Stand, the Barclay, the Geoffrey Watling City Stand and the most recent addition, the rebuilt Jarrold Stand.

Stand	Capacity
Regency Security Stand	6,239
The Barclay	6,267
Geoffrey Watling City Stand	4,338
The Jarrold Stand	8,434
Joma Community	1,708
Other	249

=== Regency Security Stand ===
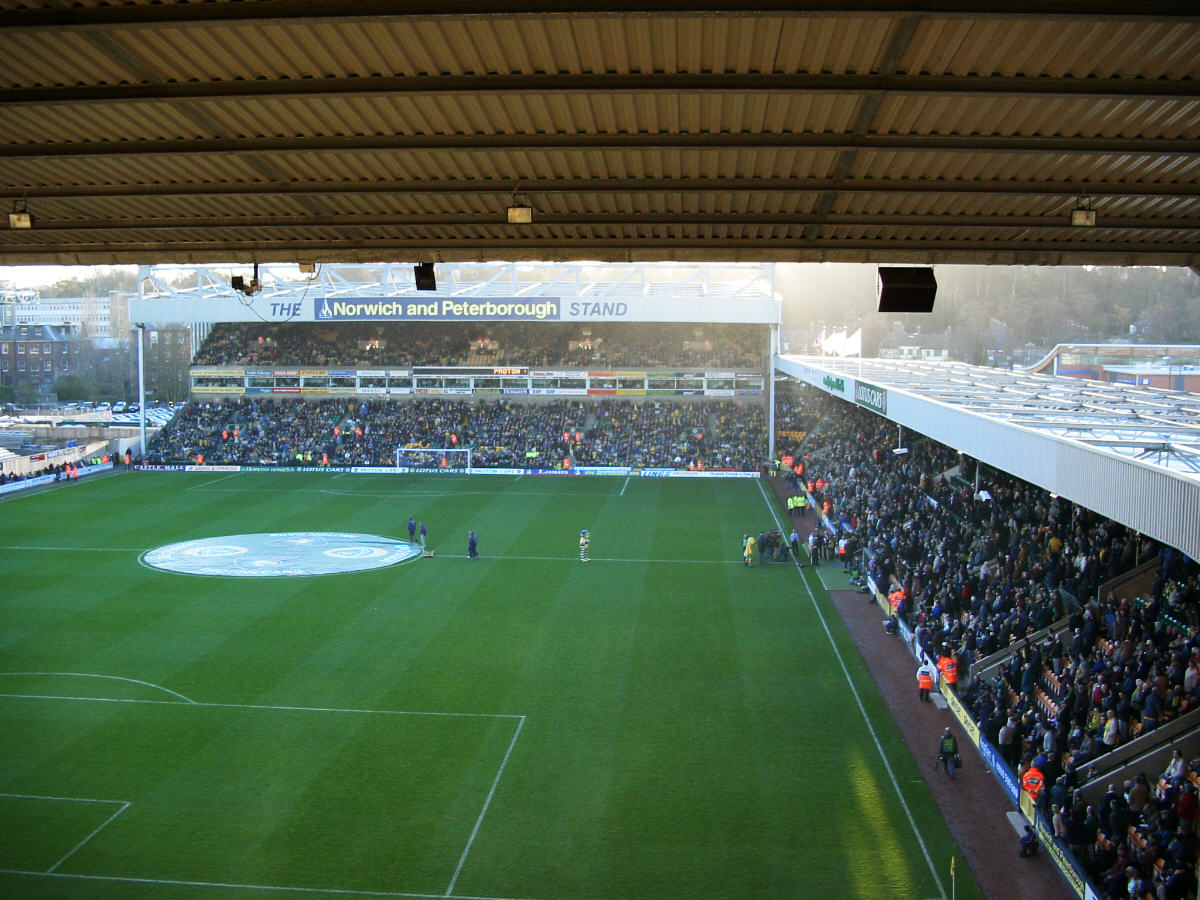
The Regency Security (background) and Geoffrey Watling (right) Stands

This end of the ground, closest to the River Wensum, was originally known as the "River End", a name that still persists among fans. The previous stand was demolished in April 1979 and its two-tiered replacement was completed in December 1979. The stand was officially named the Norwich & Peterborough Stand in the 1990s, after a sponsorship deal with the Norwich & Peterborough Building Society. An extra 160 seats were installed in the summer of 2010, bringing the capacity up to 6239 The stand was renamed the Regency Security Stand after a deal with Regency Security, the current security firm of the club.

=== The Barclay ===
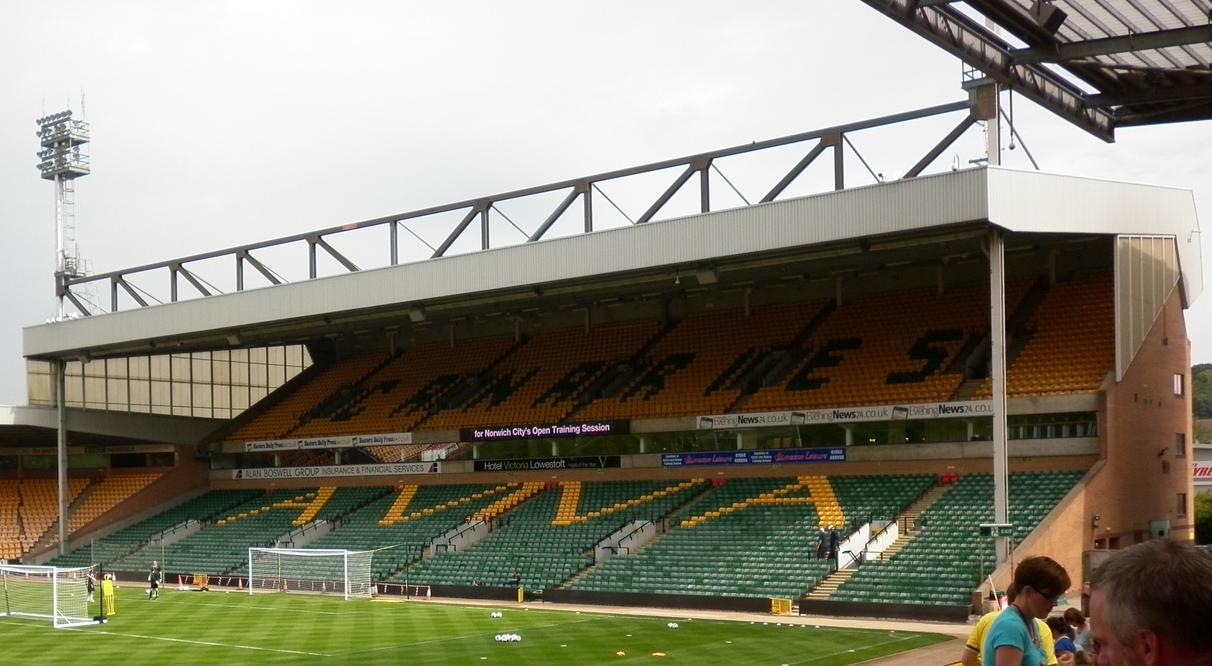
Looking towards The Barclay from The South Stand in 2011.

The Barclay is named after Captain Evelyn Barclay, a former vice-president of the club, who donated the cost of roofing the original stand. This was built in 1937, but demolished in 1992, when a new two-tier structure, modelled on the River End, was built in accordance with the recommendations of the Taylor Report, with the current capacity sitting at 6,267.

Local brewers Woodforde's Brewery were announced as the stand's sponsors in June 2018.

=== Geoffrey Watling City Stand ===
The single-tiered Geoffrey Watling City Stand was built following a severe fire in its ageing predecessor on 25 October 1984. The fire was apparently caused by an employee of the club leaving a three-bar electric fire switched on overnight.

The City Stand (as it was named at the time) cost £1.7 million to build and was used for the first time on 30 August 1986 when City hosted Southampton. It was formally opened by the Duchess of Kent on 14 February 1987. The stand was renamed in honour of Norwich City president Geoffrey Watling, who died in 2004, aged 91. The stand has the lowest capacity of the four; it also houses the directors' box, the press area and hospitality suites. Where The Barclay extends around to meet the Geoffrey Watling City Stand is the Thorpe corner infill, known to supporters as "The Snakepit". The current capacity is 4338.

=== The Jarrold Stand ===
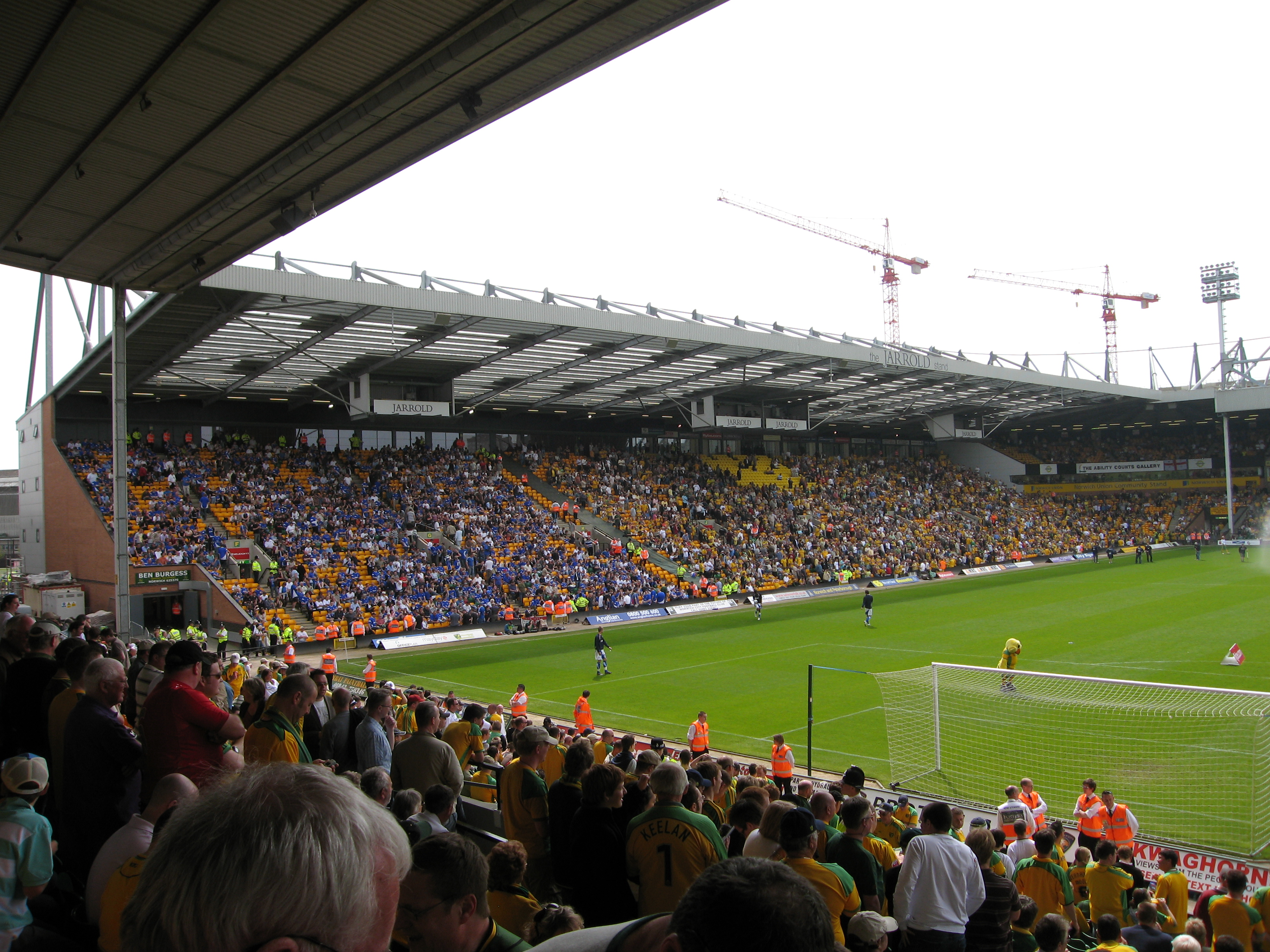
The Jarrold Stand – visiting fans are evident in blue, sitting in the block to the left of the stand (2007).

The Jarrold Stand is on the site of the former South Stand, which was named in honour of Sir Arthur South. The new stand was partially opened for the game against Sheffield United on 31 January 2004, and fully opened for the next home match, a game versus West Ham United. It was opened by Ken Brown, a former manager of both clubs.

From 2004 until May 2016, and again from the start of the 2025-26 season, the stand was sponsored by local department store Jarrolds. It is a single-tiered stand of cantilever construction with a capacity of 8,434. In 2016, a large rotating screen was installed in the gap between the Jarrold and Barclay stands, which allows fans to see various video broadcasts relating to the club. It is currently the only rotating big screen in world football. The corner infill between the Jarrold and Norwich & Peterborough stands is called the Joma Community Stand. It was built in 2005 and named after sponsors Aviva. It seats up to 1,708 fans, and also provides extensive facilities for disabled supporters.

On 15 June 2016, it was announced that following the termination of Jarrold as the stand's sponsor, the stand would revert to its historical name of the South Stand. Irish coffee company The Galway Roast were announced as the stand's new sponsors, a partnership which was terminated only months later on 2 November 2016. In August 2025, the club announced that Jarrold had resumed their sponsorship of the stand.

==== Visiting supporter accommodation ====
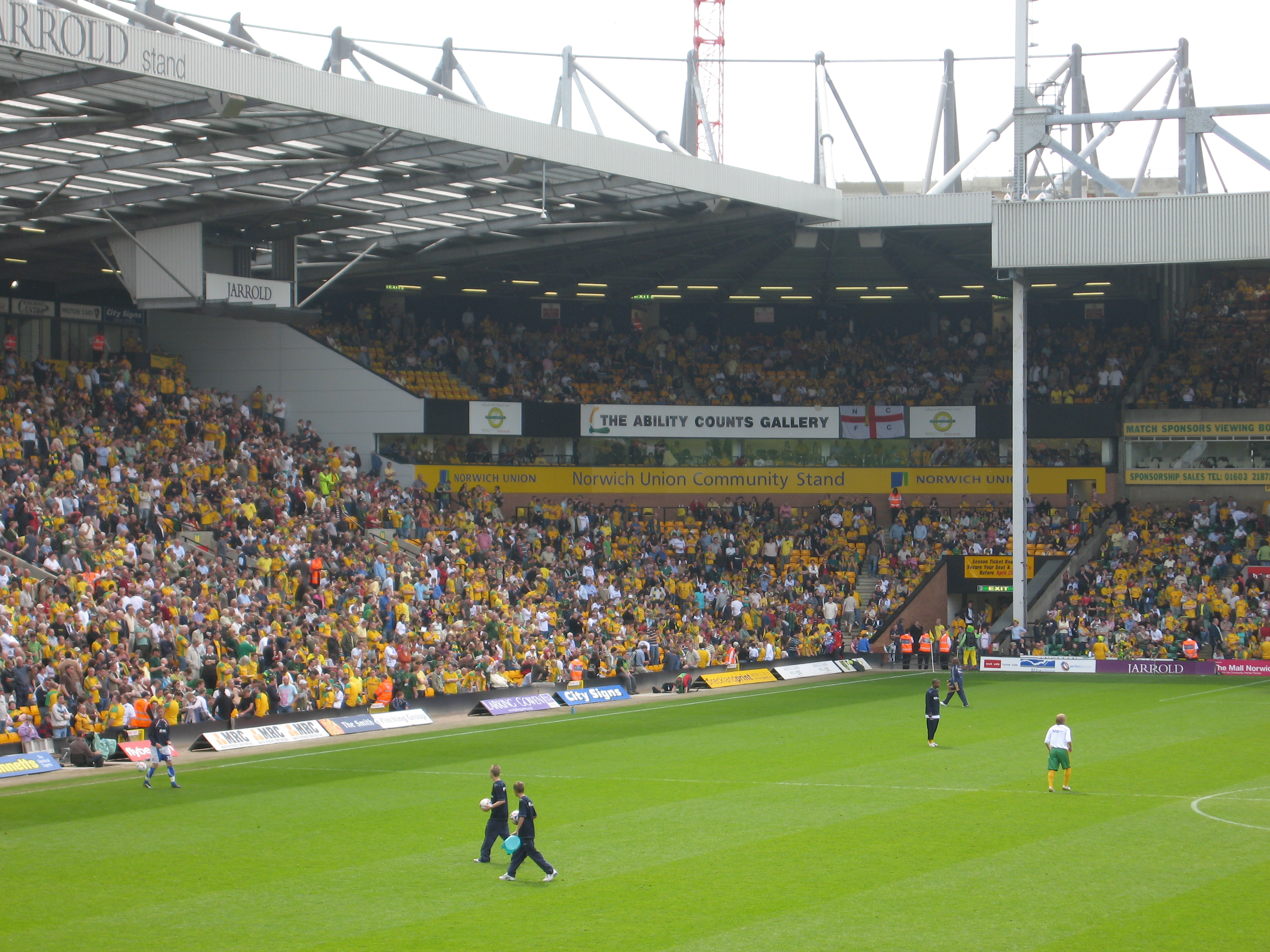
Joma Community Stand depicted in 2007 with the Norwich Union branding

Accommodation for visiting supporters is provided in the end of the South Stand closest to The Barclay. The Essential Football Fan describes the away end as follows:

"As you would expect from a new stand, the facilities and view of the playing action are good. The normal allocation in this area is 2,500 fans although this can be increased further for cup games. If you are located at the very back of the stand then you can enjoy some fine views of the city."

== Other facilities and services ==
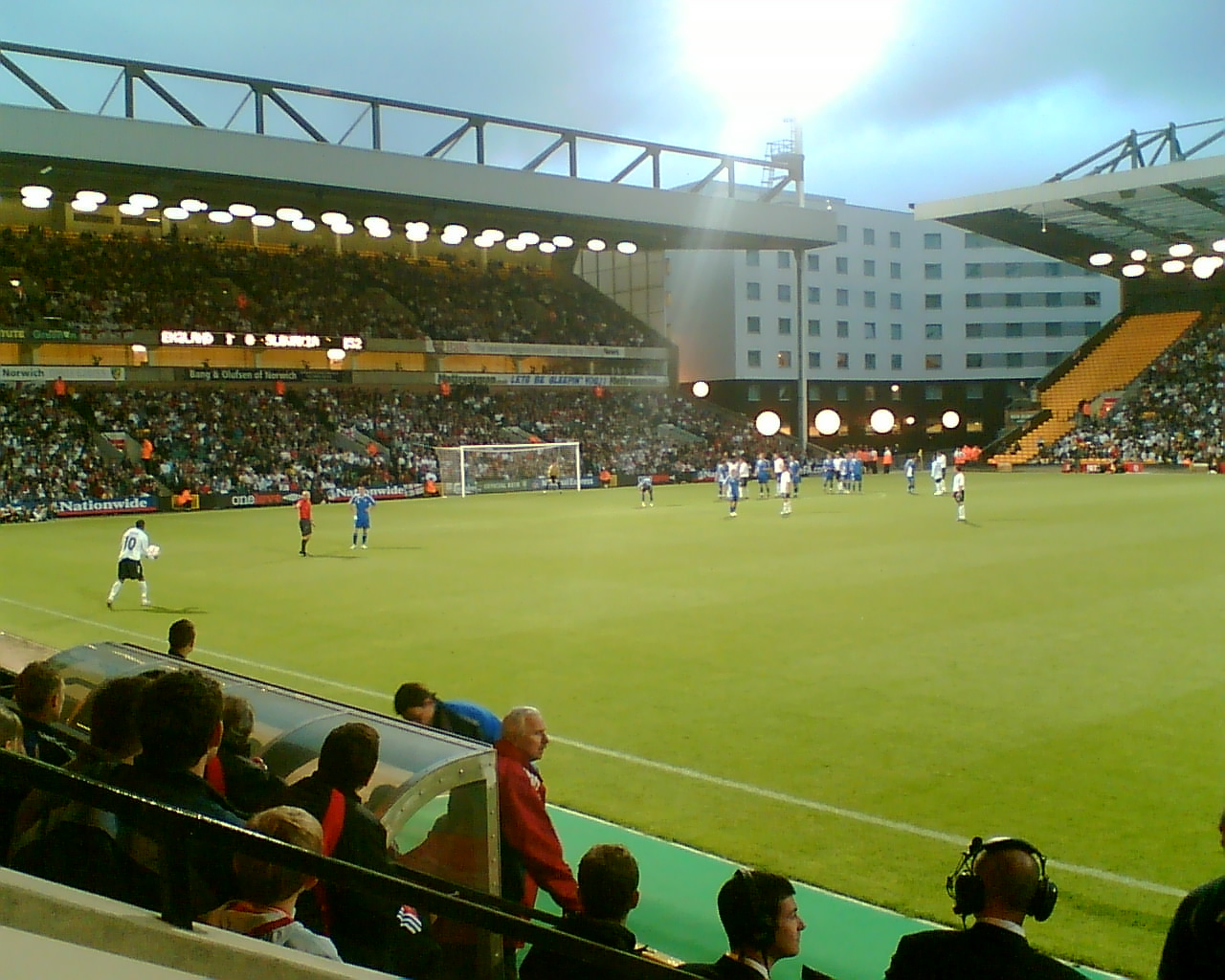
Ashley Young places the ball for a free kick for England under-21s in 2007. The Barclay and The Holiday Inn hotel can be seen in the background.

The corner between The Barclay and the Jarrold Stand contains a Holiday Inn hotel, which opened in 2007. The hotel, with six floors and 150 rooms, is held by Holiday Inn on a 150-year lease from the club, which received in return a 30% stake in the hotel and £1.1 million.

Catering at Carrow Road is provided by Delia's Canary Catering, which is part of Norwich City Football Club PLC. Smith took control of the catering at the club in 1999.

Coffee is supplied to Carrow Road by Green Farm Coffee. Coffee is available in the kiosks to fans as instant coffee and fresh filter coffee is provided in the boxes and throughout restaurants including Delia's Restaurant and Bar and Yellows American Bar & Grill.

Catering facilities include: "Yellows American Bar & Grill", an American-style diner located in the Norwich & Peterborough Stand; and "Delia's Restaurant and Bar", located in the Norwich & Peterborough Stand. "The Gunn Club" is a catering facility behind The Barclay, named after former player and manager Bryan Gunn. There are a number of other conference facilities around the ground, many named after former players and club officials such as Darren Huckerby and Sir Arthur South, as well as club sponsors Lotus Cars.

== Transport ==
Carrow Road is approximately ten minutes walking distance from Norwich railway station, which is on the Great Eastern Main Line to Liverpool Street station. Although resident parking scheme is in force in the roads surrounding the stadium, a park-and-ride facility operates around the city centre enabling visitors to the ground to arrive by bus.

== Future plans for construction ==
Norwich City have a capped season ticket allocation of 22,000, with a waiting list. The club regularly sells out its home allocation of tickets and, in 2013–14, the ground had an occupancy rate of 99.95%, one of the highest in the Premier League.

In this context, the club has often stated that it plans to increase the capacity of the stadium in the future, The Geoffrey Watling City Stand has foundations designed to support a second tier, and the roof could be removed and replaced after a second tier is added. In January 2011, chairman Alan Bowkett announced an interest in expanding the ground by about 8,000 seats, because Carrow Road was routinely close to capacity. Bowkett said:

The trade off is between capacity and price. I've had some conversations with people saying 'it's getting a bit expensive Alan' and I know it is. I think the obvious route is the Geoffrey Watling stand, whether you put another layer on it or take it down and re-build, I don't know. Probably the sensible thing to do is bite the bullet, take it down and build a new stand, but it means 18 to 24 months without revenue and the people in that stand tend to be the people who have been the supporters for many generations.

In 2012, the club commissioned the University of East Anglia to undertake a study of the costs of significantly increasing the ground's capacity. The study's report cited a cost of £20 million to expand the ground by 7,000 seats. In response, chief executive David McNally announced that the club would therefore only expand the stadium at such a time that Norwich City has become a fixture in the Premier League. At the club's 2015 AGM, it was reiterated that expansion of the ground was not a priority, although developing the training facilities at Colney, was.

== Other uses ==
=== International football ===
Carrow Road has never hosted a match involving the England national team, but the England under-21 team has played at the stadium on five occasions. The first was in 1983 in a European Under-21 Championship qualifying match against Denmark, which England won 4–1. The team played another qualifying match in the same tournament at the stadium in 1997, beating Greece 4–2. The Slovakia team featured in a friendly match at the ground in June 2007, England winning 5–0 in front of a crowd of 20,193 people. In 2010, the ground played host to a play-off against Romania, a game the home side won 2–1 in front of a then record all-seated attendance for the stadium of 25,749. Most recently, in October 2012, the England U21s defeated their Serbian counterparts 1–0 at Carrow Road.

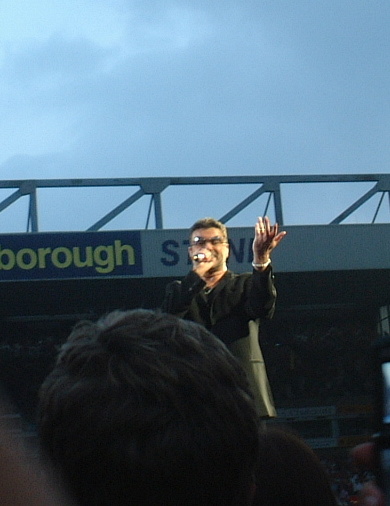
George Michael, with the Norwich & Peterborough Stand in the background, in June 2007

Games involving the England under-19 team and the full England women's team have also been played at the stadium. The women's team have played there on four occasions; the first a 1–0 defeat to Nigeria in July 2002, in front of over 8,000 fans, and the second a 1–0 victory over Iceland in March 2006, before a 9,616 crowd. In February 2022 a crowd of 14,284 saw England draw 0-0 with Spain in the Arnold Clark Cup, with Norfolk-born player Lauren Hemp making a substitute appearance at her local stadium. Hemp and the Lionesses returned to the stadium in July 2024, when a crowd of 23,003 saw them secure a 2-1 victory over the Republic of Ireland in a UEFA Women's EURO 2025 qualifier, with Alessia Russo and Georgia Stanway scoring England's goals.

=== 1986 WFA Cup final ===
Prior to 2015, finals of the Women's FA Cup were held at various grounds across the country. By coincidence, the year that Carrow Road was chosen in 1986, Norwich reached the final and defeated Doncaster Belles 4-3.

=== Music ===
The stadium has occasionally hosted music concerts. Status Quo played a concert there in 1997. Elton John, supported by Lulu, appeared at the venue in 2005. George Michael gave a performance there on 12 June 2007, supported by Sophie Ellis-Bextor, and Rod Stewart performed a concert at the stadium in June 2011.

The Elton John and George Michael concerts both attracted crowds of over 20,000 people. Andrew Cullen, the director of sales and marketing for the Carrow Road ground, told BBC Radio Norfolk prior to the George Michael performance that he hoped such concerts would become an annual summer event for the venue, if big enough star names could be attracted. Westlife were due to be performing in the stadium on 19 June 2020 for their "Stadiums in the Summer Tour" before it was cancelled due to the Coronavirus pandemic.

Take That performed at the stadium in 2017, 2019 and 2024. Summer 2022 saw The Killers perform on 9 June and Elton John perform on 15 June. Arctic Monkeys performed there on 7 June 2023.

== Summary of ground records ==
- Highest attendance: 43,984, Norwich City 0–2 Leicester City, 1962–63 FA Cup sixth round, 30 March 1963.
- Highest attendance (all-seater): 27,137, Norwich City 3–2 Newcastle United, 2015–16 Premier League, 2 April 2016.
- Biggest margin of victory: 8, Norwich City 8–0 Walsall, Football League Third Division South, 29 December 1951, Norwich City 8–0 Sutton United, 1988–89 FA Cup fourth round, 28 January 1989.
- Biggest margin of defeat: 6, Norwich City 1–7 Colchester United, Football League One, 8 August 2009.
- Goals in a game: 9 (several occurrences). Most recently; Norwich City 4–5 Liverpool, 2015–16 Premier League, 23 January 2016.
- Fastest goal from kick-off: Victor Johnson, 10 seconds.

== See also ==
- Lists of stadiums
- List of football stadiums in England
