= Geoffrey Watling =

English football executive

Geoffrey Watling (2 April 1913 – 16 November 2004) was a president and chairman of Norwich City (1957–1973 and 1996).

== Life ==
Watling was born in Norwich, Norfolk on 2 April 1913, and educated locally at the King Edward VI School and the Paston Grammar School at North Walsham.

He joined his father Charles in the family business C Watling carriers, eventually taking it over and converting it from horse transport to motor vehicles. Meanwhile, the family had become part of the Norwich establishment: Charles served as Sheriff and Lord Mayor of Norwich.

Geoffrey diversified into over 200 businesses, including ballrooms, taxi services, funeral homes and a chalet park.

In 1941 he married his wife Pearl: their daughter Carol was born in 1947.

He was a keen amateur footballer, tennis player and boatman. Watling became Chairman of Norwich City Football Club in 1957, and President for life in 1986. During this time, Norwich City reached the First Division for the first time in 1972 and remained at this level for all but three seasons until 1995, also winning two League Cups.

In 1963 Geoffrey bought Felthorpe Hall in Norfolk, the former home of Sir Basil and Lady Mayhew, and lived there until his death in November 2004 at the age of 91.

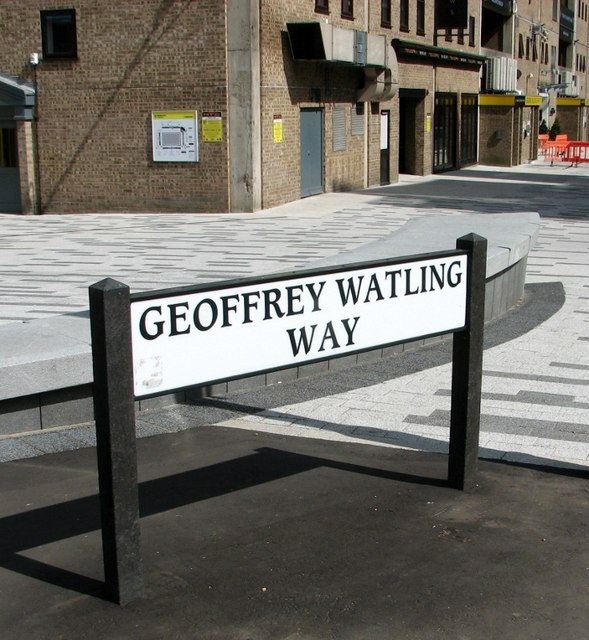
Street sign on Geoffrey Watling Way, near Carrow Road

== Legacy ==
A charity in his name was founded in 1993.

A stand at Norwich's stadium, Carrow Road is named after Watling. He was awarded this honour because of his instrumental role in saving the club from bankruptcy, both in the 1950s and 1990s; his father had played a similar role in 1919. He has a road named in honour outside Carrow Road called "Geoffrey Watling Way".
