= List of Norwich City F.C. seasons =

Norwich City Seasons from 1920 until 2023

This is a list of seasons played by Norwich City F.C. in English and European football, from 1902 (the year of the club's foundation) to the most recent completed season.

Following their foundation in 1902, Norwich City played amateur football against teams from around Norfolk. Norwich were stunned in 1904 when an FA Commission declared them to be professional and ejected them from the FA Amateur Cup. This made them even more determined and at a meeting in 1905 at the Agricultural Hall new officials established a professional football club. Norwich joined the Southern League that year and played their home games in Newmarket Road.

The club has won the Football League Cup twice, the second flight five times, the third flight twice and has a highest ever league finish of third in the Premier League. This list details the club's achievements in all major competitions, and the top scorers for each season.

== Professional era ==
Season	League record (Note: All statistics, other than top scorers, from the football club history database. Top scorers from Playfair Football Annual for relevant years, or equivalent annual publication before 1960.)									FA Cup	League Cup (Note: The League Cup was founded in 1961.)	Europe/Other	Top goalscorer(s) (Note: Goals in all competitions (Football League or Premier League, FA Cup, League Cup and European) are counted.)	
Season	Division	Pld	W	D	L	GF	GA	Pts	Pos	FA Cup	League Cup	Europe/Other	Player(s)	Goals
1902–03	N&SL	14	8	0	6	34	33	16	3rd					
1903–04	N&SL	14	5	5	4	32	20	15	3rd					
1904–05	N&SL	16	10	4	2	33	16	24	1st					
1905–06	SL	34	13	10	11	46	38	36	7th	R2			David Ross	21
1906–07	SL	38	15	12	11	57	48	42	8th	R2			David Ross	26
1907–08	SL	38	12	9	17	46	49	33	16th	R2			James Bauchop	12
1908–09	SL	40	12	11	17	59	75	35	19th	R3			John Smith	23
1909–10	SL	42	13	9	20	59	78	35	17th	R1			William Rayner	13
1910–11	SL	38	15	8	15	46	48	38	10th	R2			William Ingham	15
1911–12	SL	38	10	14	14	40	60	34	12th	R1			Dick Birchall	8
1911–12	SL	38	10	9	19	39	50	29	18th	R2			Harry Woods	9
1912–13	SL	38	9	17	12	49	51	35	14th	R1			Arthur Wolstenholme	15
1914–15	SL	38	11	14	13	53	56	36	13th	R3			Cecil Potter Danny Wilson	13
1919–20	SL	42	15	11	16	64	57	41	12th	R1			John Doran	18
1920–21	Div 3	42	10	16	16	44	53	36	16th	R1			George Travers	14
1921–22	Div 3(S)	42	12	13	17	50	62	37	15th	R1			Sam Austin	12
1922–23	Div 3(S)	42	13	10	19	51	71	36	18th	R1			Bob Dennison	15
1923–24	Div 3(S)	42	16	8	18	60	59	40	11th	R3			James Jackson	15
1924–25	Div 3(S)	42	14	13	15	53	51	41	12th	R2			James Jackson	14
1925–26	Div 3(S)	42	15	9	18	58	73	39	16th	R1			James Jackson	21
1926–27	Div 3(S)	42	12	11	19	59	71	35	16th	R3			Reg Cropper	15
1927–28	Div 3(S)	42	10	16	16	66	70	36	17th	R2			Percy Verco	32
1928–29	Div 3(S)	42	14	6	22	69	81	34	17th	R3			Frank McKenna	18
1929–30	Div 3(S)	42	18	10	10	88	77	46	8th	R2			Thomas Hunt	25
1930–31	Div 3(S)	42	10	8	24	47	76	28	22nd	R2			Thomas Williams	12
1931–32	Div 3(S)	42	17	12	13	76	67	46	10th	R2			Cyril Blakemore	16
1932–33	Div 3(S)	42	22	13	7	88	55	57	3rd	R1			Oliver Brown Ken Burditt	19
1933–34	Div 3(S)	42	25	11	6	88	49	61	1st	R1			Jack Vinall Billy Warnes	24
1934–35	Div 2	42	14	11	17	71	61	39	14th	R5			Jack Vinall	19
1935–36	Div 2	42	17	9	16	72	65	43	11th	R3			Jack Vinall	24
1936–37	Div 2	42	14	8	20	63	71	36	17th	R4			Frank Manders	17
1937–38	Div 2	42	14	11	17	56	75	39	14th	R3			Tim Coleman	16
1938–39	Div 2	42	13	5	24	50	91	31	21st	R3			Frank Manders	8
1939–40	Div 3(S)	n/a (Note: The 1939–40 season was abandoned in early September and all results annulled. At the time of the abandonment, Norwich had played three competitive matches, winning one, drawing one and losing one.)												
Norwich played no league football between 1939 and 1946 due to the Second World War
1945–46	n/a (Note: The FA Cup was contested in 1945–46 but the Football League did not resume until the following season.)									R3				
1946–47	Div 3(S)	42	10	8	24	64	100	28	21st	R2			Les Eyre	18
1947–48	Div 3(S)	42	13	8	21	61	76	34	21st	R2			Les Eyre	16
1948–49	Div 3(S)	42	16	12	14	67	49	44	10th	R2			Ron Ashman	13
1949–50	Div 3(S)	42	16	10	16	65	63	42	11th	R3			Noel Kinsey	17
1950–51	Div 3(S)	46	25	14	7	82	45	64	2nd	R5			Johnny Gavin	18
1951–52	Div 3(S)	46	26	9	11	89	50	61	3rd	R3			Roy Hollis	22
1952–53	Div 3(S)	46	25	10	11	99	55	60	4th	R2			Alf Ackerman	22
1953–54	Div 3(S)	46	20	11	15	73	66	51	7th	R5			Tommy Johnston	16
1954–55	Div 3(S)	46	18	10	18	60	60	46	12th	R2			Bobby Brennan Fred Kearns	11
1955–56	Div 3(S)	46	19	13	14	86	82	51	7th	R3			Ralph Hunt	33
1956–57	Div 3(S)	46	8	15	23	61	94	31	24th (Note: Lowest League finish.)	R1			Ralph Hunt	21
1957–58	Div 3(S)	46	19	15	12	75	70	53	8th	R3			Johnny Gavin	22
1958–59	Div 3	46	22	13	11	89	62	57	4th	SF			Terry Bly	29
1959–60	Div 3	46	24	11	11	82	54	59	2nd	R1			Terry Allcock Jimmy Hill	16
1960–61	Div 2	42	20	9	13	70	53	49	4th	R5	R4		Terry Allcock	16
1961–62	Div 2	42	14	11	17	61	70	39	17th	R5	W		Terry Allcock	21
1962–63	Div 2	42	17	8	17	80	79	42	13th	R6	QF		Terry Allcock	37
1963–64	Div 2	42	11	13	18	64	80	35	17th	R3	QF		Ron Davies	30
1964–65	Div 2	42	20	7	15	61	57	47	6th	R3	R4		Gordon Bolland	20
1965–66	Div 2	42	12	15	15	52	52	39	13th	R5	R2		Ron Davies	21
1966–67	Div 2	42	13	14	15	49	55	40	11th	R5	R2		Tommy Bryceland Laurie Sheffield	9
1967–68	Div 2	42	16	11	15	60	65	43	9th	R4	R3		Hugh Curran	18
1968–69	Div 2	42	15	10	17	53	56	40	13th	R3	R4		Hugh Curran	22
1969–70	Div 2	42	16	11	15	49	46	43	11th	R3	R2		Ken Foggo	11
1970–71	Div 2	42	15	14	13	54	52	44	10th	R3	R3		Ken Foggo	19
1971–72	Div 2	42	21	15	6	60	36	57	1st	R3	QF		Ken Foggo	13
1972–73 (Note: Texaco Cup runners-up.)	Div 1	42	11	10	21	36	63	32	20th	R3	RU		David Cross	11
1973–74	Div 1	42	7	15	20	37	62	29	22nd	R3	SF		Ted MacDougall	11
1974–75	Div 2	42	20	13	9	58	37	53	3rd	R3	RU		Ted MacDougall	17
1975–76	Div 1	42	16	10	16	58	58	42	10th	R5	R2		Ted MacDougall	23
1976–77	Div 1	42	14	9	19	47	64	37	16th	R3	R3		Viv Busby	11
1977–78	Div 1	42	11	18	13	52	66	40	13th	R3	R2		John Ryan	16
1978–79	Div 1	42	7	23	12	51	57	37	16th	R3	R4		Martin Peters	12
1979–80	Div 1	42	13	14	15	58	66	40	12th	R4	QF		Justin Fashanu	11
1980–81	Div 1	42	13	7	22	49	73	33	20th	R4	R3		Justin Fashanu	22
1981–82	Div 2	42	22	5	15	64	50	71 (Note: The 1981–82 season saw the introduction of three points for a win.)	3rd	R5	R3		Ross Jack	14
1982–83	Div 1	42	14	12	16	52	58	54	14th	R6	R4		John Deehan	21
1983–84	Div 1	42	12	15	15	48	49	51	14th	R5	QF		John Deehan	17
1984–85	Div 1	42	13	10	19	46	64	49	20th	R4	W		John Deehan	18
1985–86	Div 2	42	25	9	8	84	37	84	1st	R3	R4		Kevin Drinkell	23
1986–87	Div 1	42	17	17	8	53	51	68	5th	R4	R4		Kevin Drinkell	19
1987–88	Div 1	40	12	9	19	40	52	45	14th	R3	R3		Kevin Drinkell	12
1988–89	Div 1	38	17	11	10	48	46	60	4th	SF	R3		Robert Fleck	15
1989–90	Div 1	38	13	14	11	44	42	53	10th	R4	R3		Robert Fleck	12
1990–91	Div 1	38	13	6	19	41	64	45	15th	R6	R3		Robert Fleck Dale Gordon	9
1991–92	Div 1	42	11	12	19	47	63	45	18th	SF	QF		Robert Fleck	19
1992–93	Prem	42	21	9	12	61	65	72	3rd (Note: Highest league finish.)	R3	R4		Mark Robins	16
1993–94	Prem	42	12	17	13	65	61	53	12th	R4	R3	UEFA Cup R3	Chris Sutton	25
1994–95	Prem	42	10	13	19	37	54	43	20th	R5	QF		Ashley Ward	8
1995–96	Div 1	46	14	15	17	59	55	57	16th	R3	QF		Ashley Ward	13
1996–97	Div 1	46	17	12	17	63	68	63	13th	R4	R1		Darren Eadie	17
1997–98	Div 1	46	14	13	19	52	69	55	15th	R3	R1		Craig Bellamy	13
1998–99	Div 1	46	15	17	14	62	61	62	9th	R3	R3		Iwan Roberts	23
1999–2000	Div 1	46	14	15	17	45	50	57	12th	R3	R2		Iwan Roberts	19
2000–01	Div 1	46	14	12	20	46	58	54	15th	R3	R3		Iwan Roberts	19
2001–02	Div 1	46	22	9	15	60	51	75	6th (Note: Lost in play-off final to Birmingham City.)	R3	R1		Iwan Roberts	14
2002–03	Div 1	46	19	12	15	60	49	69	8th	R5	R1		Paul McVeigh	15
2003–04	Div 1	46	28	10	8	79	39	94	1st	R4	R1		Darren Huckerby	14
2004–05	Prem	38	7	12	19	42	77	33	19th	R3	R3		Dean Ashton	7
2005–06	Chmp	46	18	8	20	56	65	62	9th	R3	R3		Dean Ashton	11
2006–07	Chmp	46	16	9	21	56	71	57	16th	R5	R3		Robert Earnshaw	19
2007–08	Chmp	46	15	10	21	57	70	55	17th	R3	R3		Jamie Cureton	14
2008–09	Chmp	46	12	10	24	49	59	46	22nd	R3	R1		Leroy Lita	7
2009–10	L1	46	29	8	9	89	47	95	1st	R2	R2	Football League Trophy SSF	Grant Holt	30
2010–11	Chmp	46	23	15	8	83	58	84	2nd	R3	R2		Grant Holt	23
2011–12	Prem	38	12	11	15	52	66	47	12th	R5	R2		Grant Holt	17
2012–13	Prem	38	10	14	14	41	58	44	11th	R4	QF		Grant Holt	8
2013–14	Prem	38	8	9	21	28	62	33	18th	R3	R4		Gary Hooper	8
2014–15	Chmp	46	25	11	10	88	48	86	3rd (Note: Promoted to the Premier League as winners of the 2015 Football League play-offs.)	R3	R3		Cameron Jerome	21
2015–16	Prem	38	9	7	22	39	67	34	19th	R3	R4		Dieumerci Mbokani	7
2016–17	Chmp	46	20	10	16	85	69	70	8th	R3	R4		Cameron Jerome	16
2017–18	Chmp	46	15	15	16	49	60	60	14th	R3	R4		James Maddison	15
2018–19	Chmp	46	27	13	6	93	57	94	1st	R3	R4		Teemu Pukki (Note: In 2018–19, Teemu Pukki was the winner of the Golden Boot.)	30
2019–20	Prem	38	5	6	27	26	75	21	20th	QF	R2		Teemu Pukki	11
2020–21	Chmp	46	29	10	7	75	36	97	1st	R4	R1		Teemu Pukki	26
2021–22	Prem	38	5	7	26	23	84	22	20th	R5	R3		Teemu Pukki	11
2022–23	Chmp	46	17	11	18	57	54	62	13th	R3	R2		Josh Sargent	13
2023–24	Chmp	46	21	10	15	79	64	73	6th (Note: Lost in play-off semi-finals to Leeds United.)	R4	R3		Josh Sargent	16
2024–25	Chmp	46	14	15	17	71	68	57	13th	R3	R2		Borja Sainz	19
2025–26	Chmp	46	19	8	19	63	56	65	9th	R5	R2		Jovon Makama	13

== Key ==
- Pld = Matches played
- W = Matches won
- D = Matches drawn
- L = Matches lost
- GF = Goals for
- GA = Goals against
- Pts = Points
- Pos = Final position
- N&SL = Norfolk & Suffolk League
- SL = Southern League
- Div 1 = Football League First Division
- Div 2 = Football League Second Division
- Div 3(S) = Football League Third Division South
- Prem = Premier League
- Chmp = Championship
- L1 = League One
- n/a = Not applicable
- QR1 = Qualifying round 1
- QR2 = Qualifying round 2
- QR3 = Qualifying round 3
- QR4 = Qualifying round 4
- R1 = Round 1
- R2 = Round 2
- R3 = Round 3
- R4 = Round 4
- R5 = Round 5
- QF = Quarter-finals
- SF = Semi-finals

Winners	Runners-up	Promoted	Relegated
