= Jimmy Hill (footballer, born 1935) =

Northern Irish footballer and manager

Personal information
- Full name: Matthew James Hill
- Date of birth: 31 October 1935 (age 90)
- Place of birth: Carrickfergus, Northern Ireland
- Height: 5 ft 8 in (1.73 m)
- Position: Winger

Senior career*
| Years | Team | Apps | (Gls) |
- Carrick Rangers
| 1953–1957 | Linfield | | |
| 1957–1959 | Newcastle United | 11 | (2) |
| 1959–1963 | Norwich City | 161 | (55) |
| 1963–1965 | Everton | 7 | (1) |
| 1965–1968 | Port Vale | 63 | (8) |
| 1968–1971 | Derry City | | |
| Total | | 242+ | (66+) |

International career
| 1953 | Northern Ireland Amateur | 1 | (0) |
| 1956–1958 | Irish League XI | 6 | (0) |
| 1957–1960 | Northern Ireland B | 2 | (0) |
| 1959–1963 | Northern Ireland | 7 | (0) |

Managerial career
- 1968–1971: Derry City
- 1971–1972: Linfield
- 1988–1991: Carrick Rangers
- * Club domestic league appearances and goals

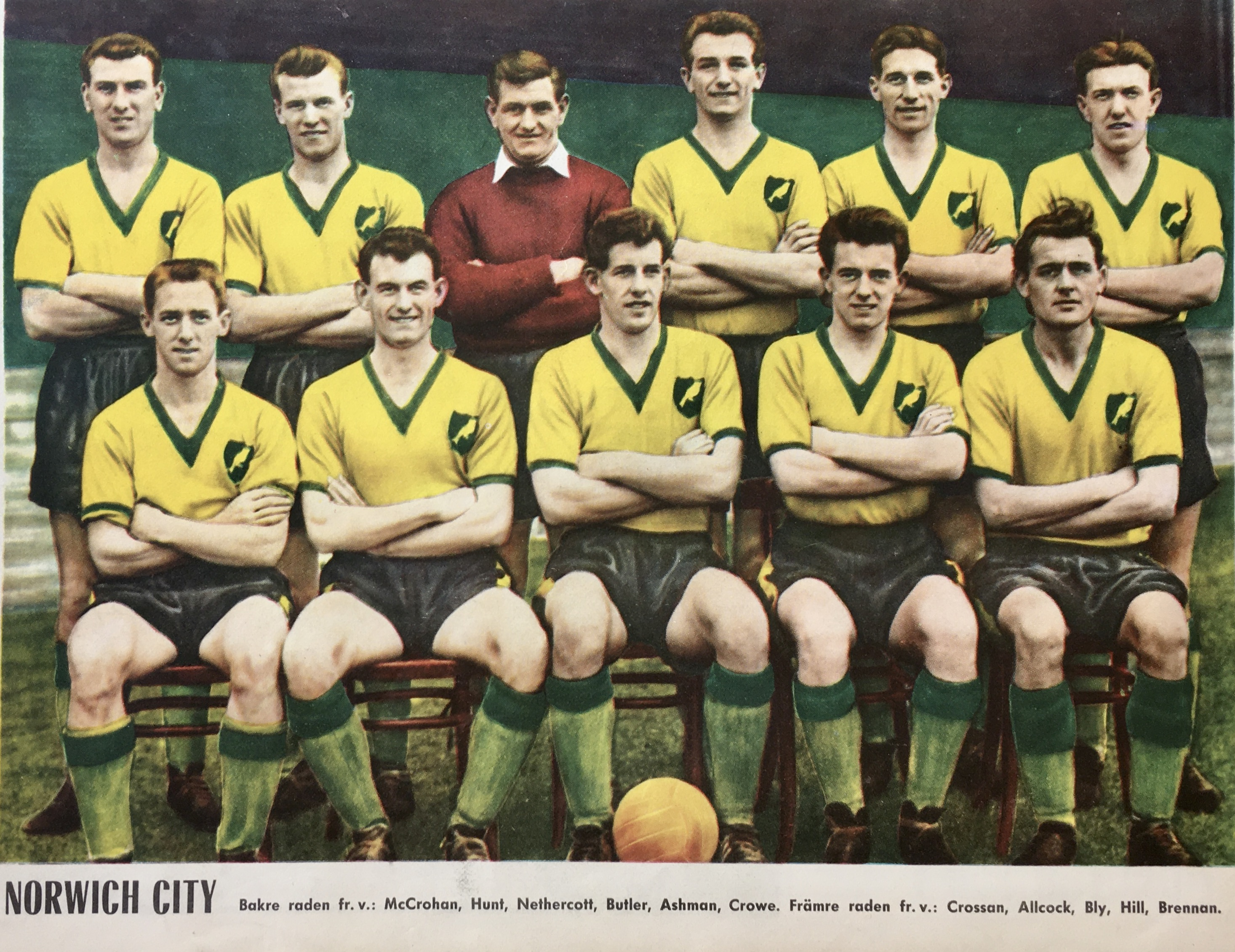
Norwich City F.C. in 1959 with – from left, standing: Roy McCrohan, Ralph Hunt, Ken Nethercott, Barry Butler, Ron Ashman, Matt Crowe; crouched from left: Errol Crossan, Terry Allcock, Terry Bly, Jimmy Hill and Bobby Brennan.

Matthew James Hill (born 31 October 1935) is a Northern Irish former footballer and manager. A winger, he scored 66 goals in 242 league appearances in an 11-year career in the Football League. He also won seven caps for Northern Ireland.

Hill played for Carrick Rangers and then Linfield, winning three Irish League titles before joining English club Newcastle United in 1957. Two years later, he moved on to Norwich City and helped the "Canaries" to win promotion out of the Third Division in 1959–60 and then to lift the League Cup in 1962. He was transferred to Everton for a £25,000 fee in 1963 but struggled with injury before being moved on to Port Vale for a £5,000 fee in October 1965. He left the club in January 1968 to become player-manager at Derry City. As a manager, he led Derry to second in the league in 1968–69 and to the 1971 Irish Cup final. He then managed Linfield for one season before embarking on a 16-year break from the game in 1972. He returned to manage Carrick Rangers from November 1988 to February 1991.

== Club career ==
Hill played for hometown club Carrick Rangers before joining Linfield. He won three successive Irish League titles at Windsor Park, in 1953–54, 1954–55, and 1955–56. He joined Newcastle United in part-exchange for Jackie Milburn in 1957. The "Magpies" struggled in the lower half of the First Division table in the 1957–58 season and finished just one point above the relegation zone. They then improved to finish 11th in 1958–59, but Hill never settled in at St James' Park, scoring two goals in just 11 league games. He moved on to Norwich City, and helped Archie Macaulay's "Canaries" to win promotion out of the Third Division in second place in 1959–60; Hill and Terry Allcock were the club's top-scorers with 16 goals. Norwich finished fourth in the Second Division in 1960–61, nine points short of a second successive promotion. New manager Willie Reid led the club to 17th in 1961–62, though Norwich found greater success in the League Cup. Norwich won the 1962 Football League Cup final with a 4–0 aggregate victory over Rochdale, Hill scoring the only goal of the second leg at Carrow Road. He left the club after a comfortable mid-table finish in 1962–63.

Everton manager Harry Catterick paid a £25,000 fee for Hill's signature in preparation for the 1963–64 season. However, his career never took off at Goodison Park, and he played just seven league games for the title challenging "Toffees". Hill was signed by Port Vale manager Jackie Mudie for a £5,000 fee in October 1965. He scored four goals in 24 appearances in the 1965–66 season, as the "Valiants" struggled in the lower half of the Fourth Division table. He scored seven goals in 39 games in the 1966–67 season but scored one goal in only nine appearances in the 1967–68 campaign as Stanley Matthews's time at the helm at Vale Park proved to be unsuccessful.

== International career ==
Hill won his first cap for the Northern Ireland senior team on 22 April 1959, in a 4–1 victory over Wales. He won further caps against Wales, West Germany, Scotland (2), and Spain, before winning his seventh and final cap in an 8–3 defeat to England on 20 November 1963.

== Management career ==
Hill returned to the Irish League as player-manager of Derry City in 1968, guiding them to runners-up spot in the Irish League in 1968–69. He then led the "Candystripes" to fifth place in 1969–70 and ninth in 1970–71. He took Derry to the final of the Irish Cup at Windsor Park in 1971, where they were beaten 3–0 by Distillery. He then left Brandywell for the management position at Linfield. He took the club to fourth place in 1971–72 before resigning at Windsor Park for personal reasons. Hill ran a sports shop in his native Carrickfergus for 20 years before taking the job as Carrick Rangers manager in November 1988. He led the "Gers" to eighth place in 1988–89 and tenth place in 1989–90, before he resigned from his post at Taylors Avenue in February 1991 as the club headed for a second-from-bottom finish in 1990–91.

== Career statistics ==
=== Club statistics ===
Appearances and goals by club, season and competition
| Club | Season | League | | | FA Cup | | League Cup | | Total | |
| Club | Season | Division | Apps | Goals | Apps | Goals | Apps | Goals | Apps | Goals |
|---|---|---|---|---|---|---|---|---|---|---|
| Newcastle United | 1957–58 | First Division | 11 | 2 | 0 | 0 | — | | 11 | 2 |
| Norwich City | 1958–59 | Third Division | 33 | 11 | 11 | 2 | — | | 44 | 13 |
| Norwich City | 1959–60 | Third Division | 38 | 16 | 2 | 0 | — | | 40 | 16 |
| Norwich City | 1960–61 | Second Division | 31 | 9 | 4 | 1 | 0 | 0 | 35 | 10 |
| Norwich City | 1961–62 | Second Division | 31 | 6 | 3 | 1 | 6 | 4 | 40 | 11 |
| Norwich City | 1962–63 | Second Division | 28 | 13 | 5 | 1 | 3 | 2 | 36 | 16 |
| Norwich City | Total | | 161 | 55 | 25 | 5 | 9 | 6 | 195 | 66 |
| Everton | 1963–64 | First Division | 7 | 1 | 0 | 0 | 0 | 0 | 7 | 1 |
| Port Vale | 1965–66 | Fourth Division | 20 | 1 | 4 | 2 | 0 | 0 | 24 | 3 |
| Port Vale | 1966–67 | Fourth Division | 36 | 6 | 3 | 1 | 0 | 0 | 39 | 7 |
| Port Vale | 1967–68 | Fourth Division | 7 | 1 | 0 | 0 | 2 | 0 | 9 | 1 |
| Port Vale | Total | | 63 | 8 | 7 | 3 | 2 | 0 | 72 | 11 |
| Career total | | | 242 | 66 | 32 | 8 | 11 | 6 | 285 | 80 |

=== International statistics ===
Northern Ireland national team
| Year | Apps | Goals |
|---|---|---|
| 1959 | 1 | 0 |
| 1960 | 2 | 0 |
| 1961 | 1 | 0 |
| 1963 | 3 | 0 |
| Total | 7 | 0 |

== Honours ==
Norwich City

- Football League Third Division second-place promotion: 1959–60
- Football League Cup: 1961–62

Derry City

- Irish Cup runner-up: 1971
