= Barry Butler (footballer, born 1934) =

English footballer (1934–1966)

Personal information
- Date of birth: 30 July 1934
- Place of birth: Stockton-on-Tees, England
- Date of death: 9 April 1966 (aged 31)
- Place of death: Sprowston, Norwich, England
- Position: Centre half

Youth career
- Stockton West End
- Billingham Minors
- South Bank Juniors

Senior career*
Years	Team	Apps	(Gls)
- South Bank
1952–1957	Sheffield Wednesday	26	(1)
1957–1966	Norwich City	303	(3)
Total		329	(4)
- * Club domestic league appearances and goals

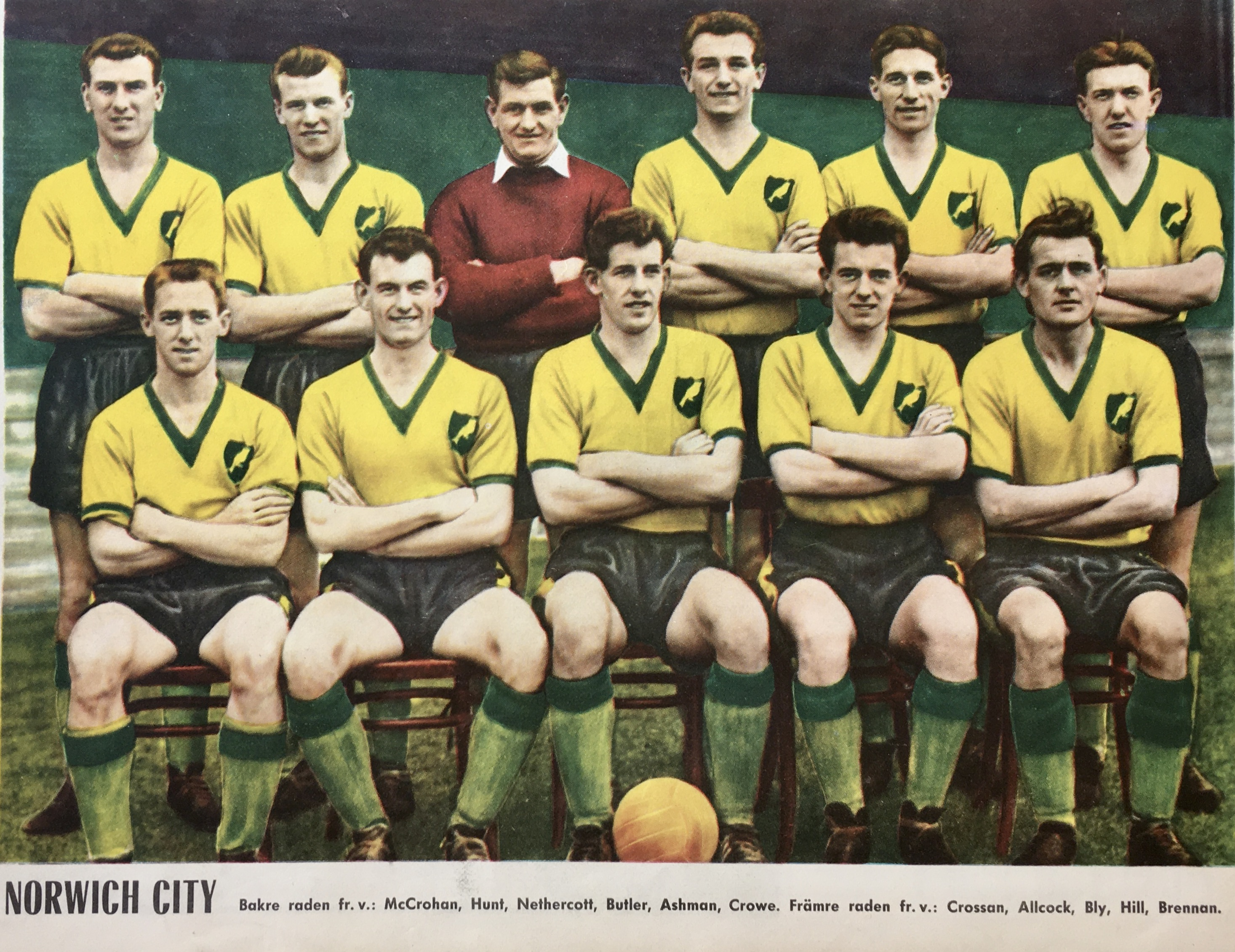
Norwich City F.C. in 1959 with – from left, standing: Roy McCrohan, Ralph Hunt, Ken Nethercott, Barry Butler, Ron Ashman, Matt Crowe; crouched from left: Errol Crossan, Terry Allcock, Terry Bly, Jimmy Hill and Bobby Brennan.

Barry Butler (30 July 1934 – 9 April 1966) was an English professional footballer who spent most of his career at Norwich City. He is remembered by his teammates and supporters as an inspirational captain and outstanding defensive player.

Butler, who played for Norwich until his death in a car crash in 1966, was often referred to as one of the best defenders in the league by opponents and is regarded as one of Norwich's greatest ever players. Butler also played for Sheffield Wednesday.

== Early life ==
Butler was educated at Richard Hind secondary school in his hometown of Stockton. Whilst there he captained both the football and cricket teams. Upon leaving school Butler took a job as an apprentice electrical fitter at ICI in nearby Billingham where he played in the works football team. He played for various minor clubs whilst at ICI including Northern League side South Bank.

== Career ==
=== Sheffield Wednesday ===
Butler joined Sheffield Wednesday as a teenager in September 1952 with the Hillsborough club paying South Bank £300 for his services. After working his way up the ranks in the "A" team and reserves he finally made his first team debut for the Owls on 2 January 1954 at the age of 19. Butler replaced the injured Cyril Turton in a Division One game at home to Burnley; the game finished as a 2–0 win for Wednesday.

The match would be the start of a 19 consecutive game run in the first team for Butler, a sequence that ended in the 4–1 loss at home to Huddersfield Town on 3 April. The run included eight FA Cup games as the Owls reached the semi-finals, eventually being beaten 2–0 by Preston North End at Maine Road. He made several appearances the following season, but the increased competition caused by the signing of Don McEvoy in December 1954 spelled the end of his Wednesday career. Butler played just three more games in a Wednesday shirt – the final one as a centre-forward – before he was relegated to the reserves for the remaining two years of his time at Hillsborough. He played a total of 36 games for the club, scoring once in a 2–1 loss away to Blackpool on 19 February 1955.

=== Norwich City ===
Norwich manager Archie Macaulay paid Sheffield Wednesday a transfer fee of £5,000 for Butler in August 1957, just after he had finished his service in the RAF. He immediately made an impression and established himself as an essential member of the side. In the 1958–59 season, he was a member of the Norwich team that embarked on one of the most famous FA Cup runs of all time. A Third Division side at the time, they reached the semi-finals, defeating, among others, First Division sides Tottenham Hotspur and Manchester United along the way and narrowly lost the semi-final in a replay at St Andrews against Luton Town. The following season, Butler played in every match of the campaign as City won promotion to the Second Division. Two years later, he was a key member of the Norwich team that won the League Cup for the first time, as they beat Rochdale 4–0 in a two-legged final. At the time Butler was considered to be the best uncapped centre-half in the country.

In 1963, Butler was appointed team captain when Ron Ashman relinquished his playing duties to take up the job of managing the team on a permanent basis. Around the same time he earned his FA coaching badge, and later he was awarded the role of player-coach for the 1966–67 season. He played a total of 349 matches for the club including a consecutive run of 208 games which was only broken because of his appearance in an FA XI side.

== Death ==
Butler would never take up his position as player-coach. On 9 April 1966, Butler was killed in a car crash at the age of 31, his car having collided with a bus late at night. His funeral was held at St Peter Mancroft church in Norwich.

== Legacy ==
The year after his death, the Norwich City player of the year award was named The Barry Butler Memorial Trophy in his honour, and has been voted for by the supporters every year since then.

In 2002, when the club held an on-pitch reunion of former players prior to a match against Harwich & Parkeston to mark the club's centenary, Butler's widow attended to represent him. His son David also attended a Hall of Fame dinner at Carrow Road in January 2004.

Butler's teammate Bill Punton described him as "...probably the best centre-half who has ever played for the club...On the field he was a leader, a real leader. He was the man who kept the team going all the time."

== Honours ==
Norwich City

- Football League Cup: 1961–62
