= Errol Crossan =

Canadian professional soccer player

Personal information
- Full name: Errol Gilmour Crossan
- Date of birth: 6 October 1930
- Place of birth: Montreal, Quebec, Canada
- Date of death: 23 April 2016 (aged 85)
- Place of death: Langley, BC, Canada
- Position: Right winger

Senior career*
Years	Team	Apps	(Gls)
1949	Marpole Athletic Club		
1950–1951	St. Andrews FC		
1951–1954	New Westminster Royals		
1954–1955	Manchester City	0	(0)
1955–1957	Gillingham	76	(16)
1957–1958	Southend United	40	(11)
1958–1961	Norwich City	102	(28)
1961	Leyton Orient	8	(2)
1961	Toronto City		
1961–1962	New Westminster Royals		
1963–1966	Vancouver Columbus FC		
1966–1969	New Westminster Royals / Labatt's		
Total		226	(57)
- * Club domestic league appearances and goals

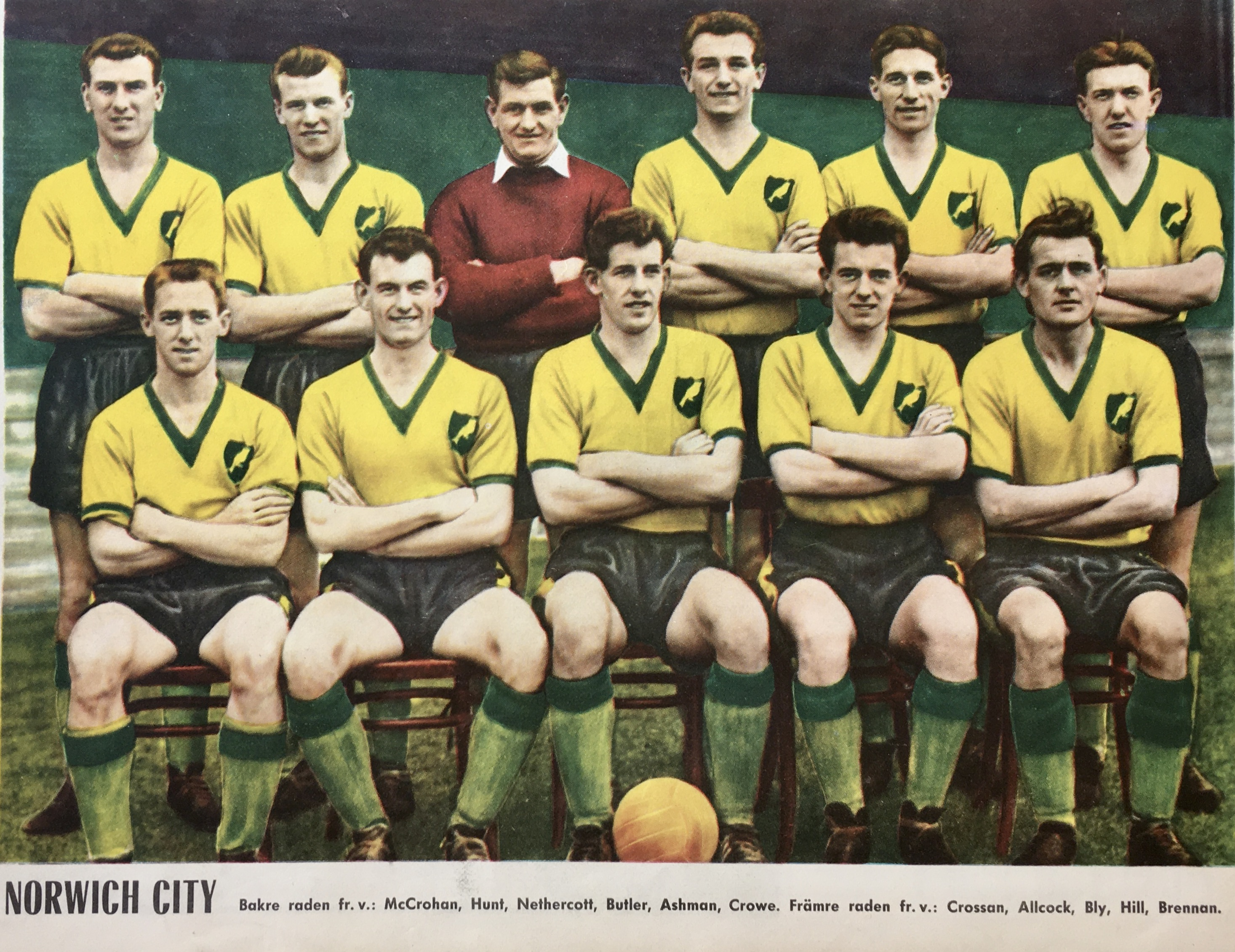
Norwich City F.C. in 1959 with – from left, standing: Roy McCrohan, Ralph Hunt, Ken Nethercott, Barry Butler, Ron Ashman, Matt Crowe; crouched from left: Errol Crossan, Terry Allcock, Terry Bly, Jimmy Hill and Bobby Brennan.

Errol Gilmour Crossan (6 October 1930 – 23 April 2016) was a Canadian professional soccer player, active primarily in England, who played as a right winger.

== Early and personal life ==
Crossan was born in Montreal. His family moved to the Isle of Man when he was eight, before returning to Canada in 1949, where he began his career with the Marpole Athletic Club.

== Career ==
After making his Pacific Coast League debut with Vancouver St. Andrews FC in 1950–51, he played three seasons with New Westminster Royals from 1951–52 to 1953–54. He helped the Royals capture the 1952–53 league title and then the 1953 Canadian championship.

In 1953, he played in a North American championship match, helping the Royals win the Jack Diamond Trophy over the Chicago Falcons.

After a proposed move to England to play for Liverpool in 1953 fell through, Crossan joined Manchester City in January 1954. He later played for Gillingham, Southend United, Norwich City and Leyton Orient, scoring 57 goals in 226 games in the Football League.

Crossan played a significant role in Norwich's 1959 FA Cup run, when the team from the Third Division reached the semifinal, beating Manchester United along the way. Crossan played in all 11 ties, scoring four goals.

He later returned to Canada to play for Toronto City, before moving west to resume his career in the Pacific Coast League. After a season with the New Westminster Royals, he joined Vancouver Columbus FC. He spent the next three seasons with Columbus FC where he won his second Canadian title in 1964. He then rejoined Westminster Royals.

Crossan was inducted into the Canadian Soccer Hall of Fame in 2000 and the Norwich City Hall of Fame in 2002.

He died on 23 April 2016 in Langley, British Columbia.

== Honours ==
=== Team ===
Westminster Royals

- Canadian Championship (Challenge Trophy) winner (1953)
- Pacific Coast League winner (1952–53)
- Jack Diamond Trophy, North American championship (1953)

Vancouver Columbus FC

- Canadian Championship (Challenge Trophy) winner (1964)

=== Individual ===
- Canada Soccer Hall of Fame: 2000
- Norwich City Hall of Fame: 2002
- Soccer Hall of Fame of British Columbia: 2019
