= Terry Allcock =

English footballer and cricketer (1935–2024)

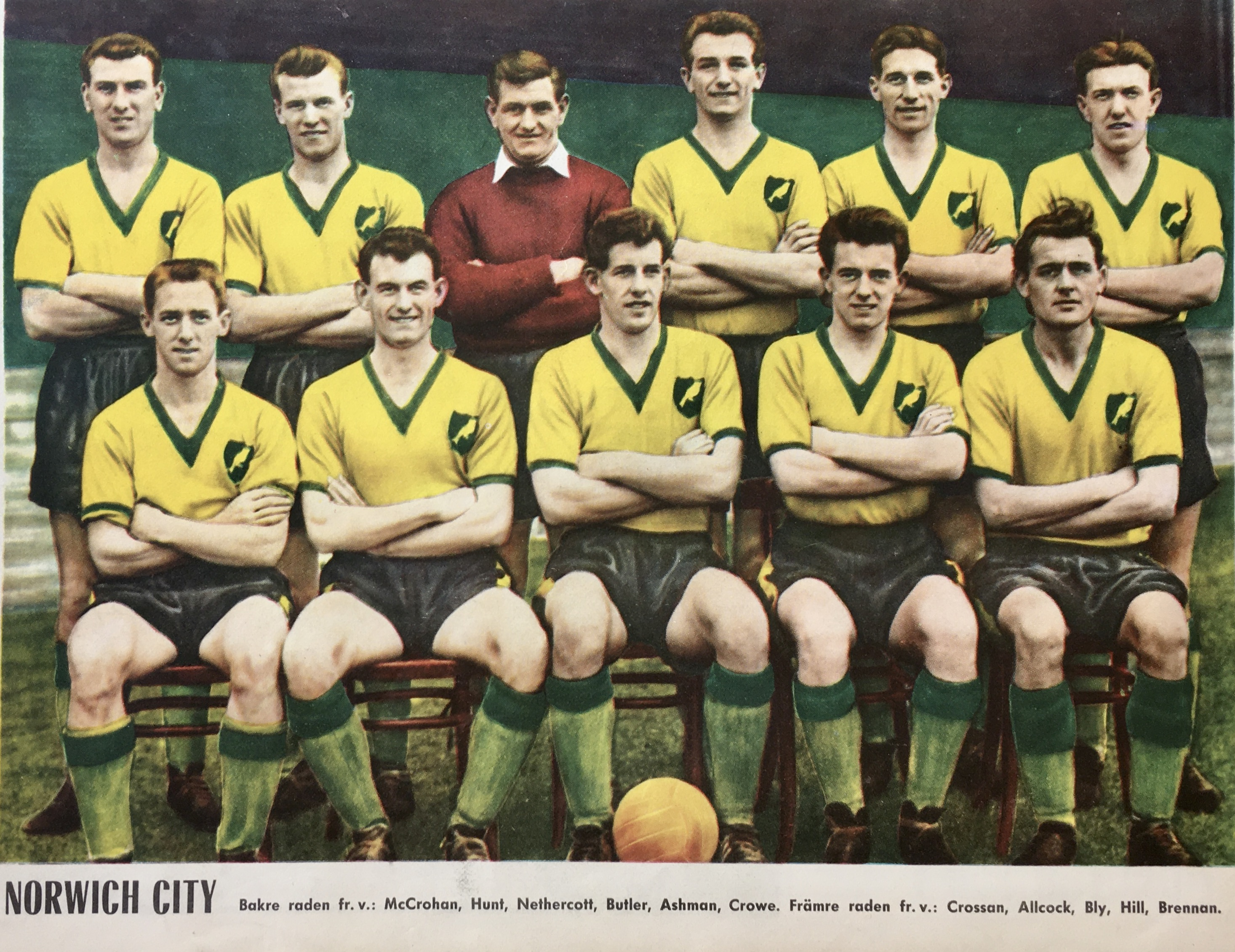
- Norwich City in 1959 with – from left, standing: Roy McCrohan, Ralph Hunt, Ken Nethercott, Barry Butler, Ron Ashman, Matt Crowe; sitting, from left: Errol Crossan, Terry Allcock, Terry Bly, Jimmy Hill and Bobby Brennan.

Personal information
- Full name: Terence Allcock
- Date of birth: 10 December 1935
- Place of birth: Leeds, England
- Date of death: 11 June 2024 (aged 88)
- Height: 5 ft 11 in (1.80 m)
- Position: Forward

Senior career*
Years	Team	Apps	(Gls)
1953–1958	Bolton Wanderers	31	(9)
1958–1969	Norwich City	339	(106)
Total		370	(115)
- * Club domestic league appearances and goals

Terence Allcock (10 December 1935 – 11 June 2024) was an English professional footballer who played as a forward for Bolton Wanderers and Norwich City. He was also a cricketer who played for Norfolk County Cricket Club.

== Football career ==
=== Bolton Wanderers ===
Allcock was born in Leeds in 1935 and began his football career with Bolton Wanderers, who approached him while he was captain of Yorkshire schoolboys. When interviewed in 2004 for the book Twelve Canary Greats, Allcock stated that his decision to sign for Bolton was made when his father's job moved to Blackpool and Bolton permitted him to commute from there. He made his first team debut in October 1953 against Manchester City and scored twice in the first twenty minutes. Despite his good start, Allcock was unable to secure a regular first team spot at Burnden Park because he was competing against internationals Nat Lofthouse, Willie Moir and Harold Hassall for a place in the team. He signed for Norwich shortly before the transfer deadline in March 1958.

=== Norwich City ===
In his first full season at Carrow Road, Norwich had one of the most famous FA Cup runs of all time when they reached the semi-finals as a Third Division team. Allcock scored against Tottenham Hotspur in the tie at White Hart Lane. He went on to play 389 games for Norwich, with his final appearance coming against Blackburn Rovers at Carrow Road on 23 April 1969. His 127 goals for the club place him second on City's all time goalscoring list, just five goals behind Johnny Gavin. Allcock spent most of his career as a forward, but his last five seasons with Norwich were spent playing at half-back. If he had continued to play as a forward, he would almost certainly have beaten Gavin's record. Allcock also has the record of scoring 37 goals in a calendar season, the highest achieved in any calendar season by a Norwich City player.

== Cricket career ==
Allcock played cricket as a wicket-keeper for Norfolk County Cricket Club, appearing for the county in the Minor Counties Championship from 1959 to 1975. He was only able to appear infrequently, and made a total of 45 Championship appearances for the county. He scored 1,470 championship runs, with eight half-centuries, and was involved in 93 dismissals as a wicket-keeper. His highest score for Norfolk of 82 runs came against Cambridgeshire at Norfolk's Lakenham ground in 1973. He also played in two List A matches, playing in the 1965 Gillette Cup against Hampshire―a first-class county team―and against Cheshire in the same competition in 1968. He made scores of 24 against Hampshire and four against Cheshire, taking a single catch on debut.

== After playing ==
Allcock stayed at Norwich as a coach until 1973 before a brief coaching stint at Manchester City. He was formally a matchday host at Carrow Road and in 2002 was made an inaugural member of the Norwich City F.C. Hall of Fame. Allcock was a partner in the family funeral business.

Allcock died on 11 June 2024, at the age of 88.
