= Roy McCrohan =

English footballer (1930–2015)

Personal information
- Date of birth: 22 September 1930
- Place of birth: Reading, Berkshire, England
- Date of death: 3 March 2015 (aged 84)
- Position: Wing half

Youth career
- Reading

Senior career*
Years	Team	Apps	(Gls)
1949–1951	Reading	4	(1)
1951–1962	Norwich City	385	(20)
1962–1964	Colchester United	75	(5)
1964–1965	Bristol Rovers	10	(1)
Total		474	(27)
- * Club domestic league appearances and goals

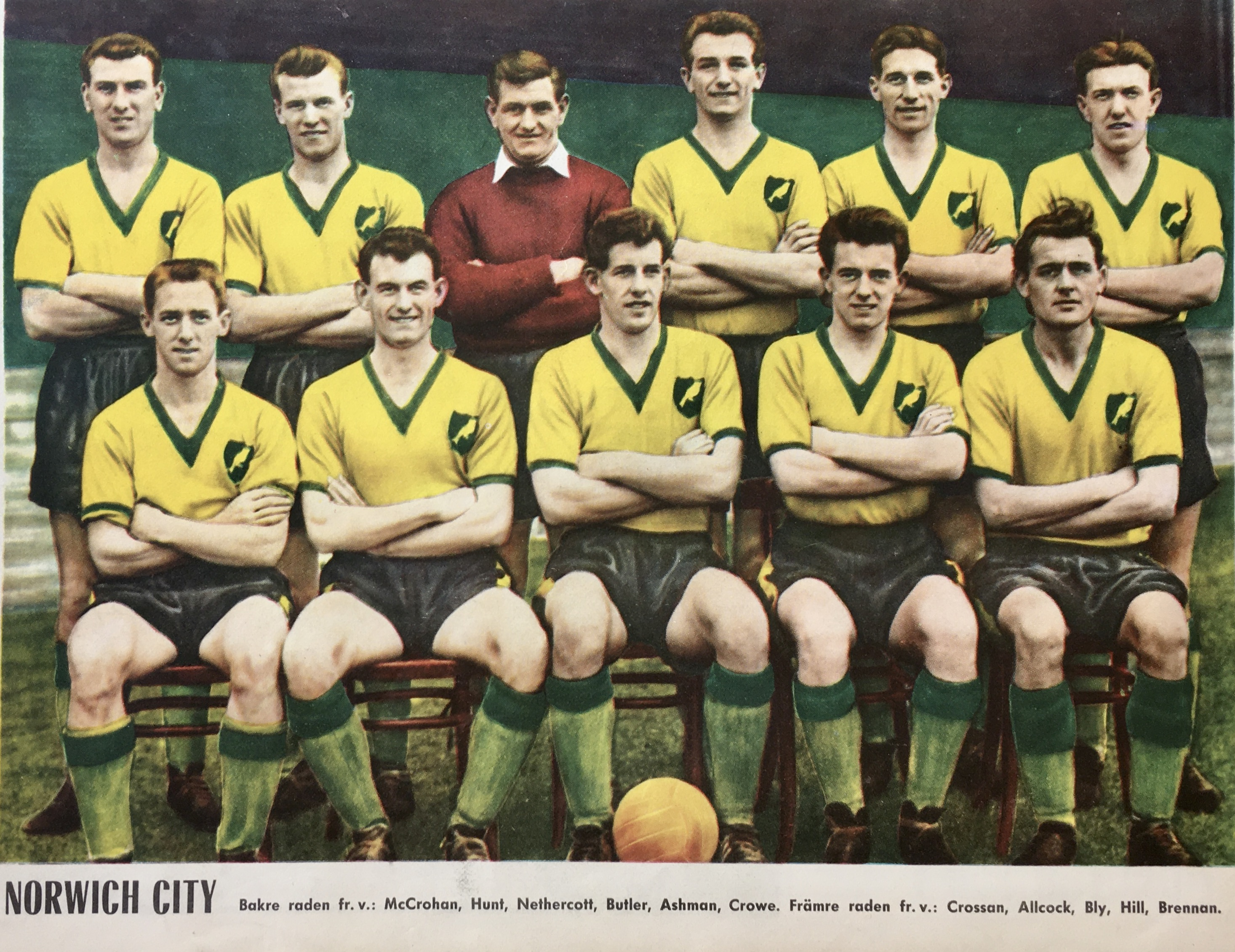
Norwich City F.C. in 1959 – from left, standing: Roy McCrohan, Ralph Hunt, Ken Nethercott, Barry Butler, Ron Ashman, Matt Crowe; sitting from left: Errol Crossan, Terry Allcock, Terry Bly, Jimmy Hill and Bobby Brennan.

Roy McCrohan (22 September 1930 – 3 March 2015) was an English professional footballer who played as a wing half.

== Career ==
Born in Reading, Berkshire, McCrohan spent the majority of his career with Norwich City before playing for Colchester United and Bristol Rovers. He was a member of the Norwich sides which reached the semi-finals of the FA Cup in 1959 as a third division team, won promotion to division two in 1960 and won the League Cup in 1962. He later coached at Bristol Rovers, Aldershot, Fulham and Ipswich Town, both the latter two with Bobby Robson, and was assistant manager at Luton Town before moving to live in the USA. He was an assistant coach for the Detroit Express for the 1978 NASL season. He was named head coach of the Minnesota Kicks on 14 December 1978. He coached the team for the 1979 NASL season and first nine games of the 1980 NASL season.

== Death ==
McCrohan died on 3 March 2015 in the West Country after a long illness.

== Honours ==
Norwich City

- Football League Cup: 1961–62
- Football League Third Division runner-up: 1959–60
