= Duggie Lochhead =

Scottish footballer and manager (1904–1968)

Personal information
- Full name: Dougald Lochhead
- Date of birth: 16 December 1903
- Place of birth: Partick, Scotland
- Date of death: 29 August 1968 (aged 63)
- Place of death: Leeds, England
- Height: 5 ft 11 in (1.80 m)
- Position: Left half

Youth career
- St Peter's Boys Guild
- Eaglesham
- Maryhill Juniors
- St Anthony's

Senior career*
Years	Team	Apps	(Gls)
1925–1928	St Johnstone	18	(0)
1928–1929	Walsall	42	(0)
1929–1935	Norwich City	210	(5)
Total		270	(5)

Managerial career
- 1945–1946: Norwich City
- 1947–1950: Norwich City
- 1950–1952: Galatasaray S.K.
- 1953–1956: Heracles Almelo
- 1956–1958: Merthyr Tydfil
- * Club domestic league appearances and goals

Dougald "Duggie" Lochhead (16 December 1903 – 29 August 1968) was a Scottish professional football player and manager.

== Career ==
=== Playing career ===
Lochhead joined St Johnstone in summer 1925, just after the club had been promoted to the First Division for the first time. Playing as a left-half, he made 18 appearances for The Saints over three seasons, before moving to Walsall in June 1928. He spent just one year in the Midlands, playing 42 games for The Saddlers without scoring, and then joined Norwich City in June 1929. He has the distinction of scoring the first-ever League goal at Carrow Road, in a 4–3 victory over West Ham United on 31 August 1935, one of just five in 223 competitive matches for Norwich before his retirement the following month.

=== Coaching career ===
After retiring as a player, Lochhead became an assistant manager and scout at Norwich City. He remained at the club during the Second World War, making three wartime appearances due to player shortages. He managed Norwich during the transitional post-war season of 1945–1946, but the board decided to replace him with the more experienced Cyril Spiers, who left after just one season in which the Canaries finished second from bottom of the Third Division (South), ahead of Mansfield Town on goal average despite conceding 100 times in 42 matches. Spiers returned to his former club, Cardiff City, in December 1947 and Lochhead was re-appointed with City bottom of the League. He improved the performances but could not better Spiers' position, as City again avoided last place on goal average, this time ahead of Brighton & Hove Albion, and again had to apply for re-election. Lochhead then managed two mid-table finishes, winning 57, drawing 40 and losing 74 and drawing of his 171 matches, but his health was shattered after an accident in August 1949 and he was replaced by Norman Low in March 1950. Lochhead also signed Johnny Gavin from Limerick in 1948, who remains Norwich's all-time top goalscorer, and brought two of the club's highest appearance-makers, Ron Ashman and Ken Nethercott, into the side.

He also coached in Europe, including Galatasaray (Turkey) and Heracles Almelo of the Netherlands, before returning to the United Kingdom to spend two years as manager of non-League Merthyr Tydfil.
