= On the ball =

On the Ball may refer to:

- On the Ball (Australian talk show), a 1984–2002 Australian television football talk show
- On the Ball (UK TV programme), a 1965–1985 and 1998–2004 British Saturday lunchtime football television programme
- On the Ball (film), a 1952 British 3D film
- On the Ball (video game series), a football management video game series first released in 1993
- "On the Ball, City", a Norwich City FC football chant
- Cameltry, the SNES title for the 1989 arcade game
- "On the Ball", a 2002 episode of the British television soap opera Footballers' Wives; see List of Footballers' Wives episodes
