= Ken Nethercott =

English footballer

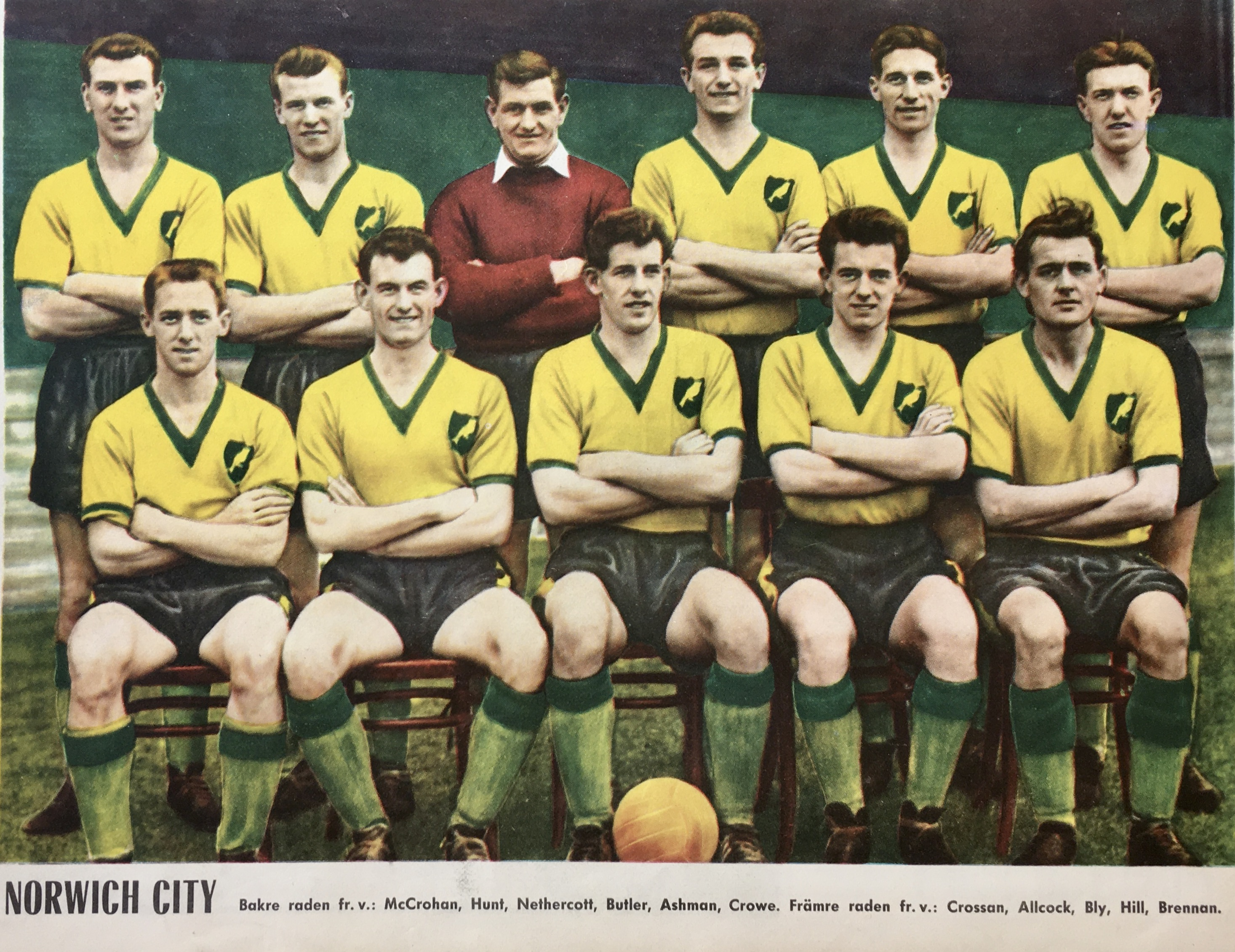
Norwich City F.C. in 1959 with – from left, standing: Roy McCrohan, Ralph Hunt, Ken Nethercott, Barry Butler, Ron Ashman, Matt Crowe; crouched from left: Errol Crossan, Terry Allcock, Terry Bly, Jimmy Hill and Bobby Brennan.

Kenneth Walter Samuel Nethercott (22 July 1925 - 14 December 2007) was an English professional footballer who played as a goalkeeper.

Nethercott began his career as an amateur with Cardiff City before signing a professional contract with Norwich City in 1947. He stayed at Carrow Road for 12 years, making 416 appearances for the Canaries; 378 in the league.

On 14 December 2007, Norwich City announced Nethercott's death at the age of 82.
