= Terry Bly =

English footballer and manager

Personal information
- Full name: Terence Geoffrey Bly
- Date of birth: 22 October 1935
- Place of birth: Fincham, England
- Date of death: 24 September 2009 (aged 73)
- Place of death: Grantham, England
- Position: Striker

Senior career*
Years	Team	Apps	(Gls)
	Bury Town	?	(?)
1956–1960	Norwich City	57	(31)
1960–1962	Peterborough United	88	(81)
1962–1963	Coventry City	42	(30)
1963–1964	Notts County	29	(4)
1964–1970	Grantham	199	(125)
Total		405	(266)

Managerial career
- 1964–1978: Grantham
- * Club domestic league appearances and goals

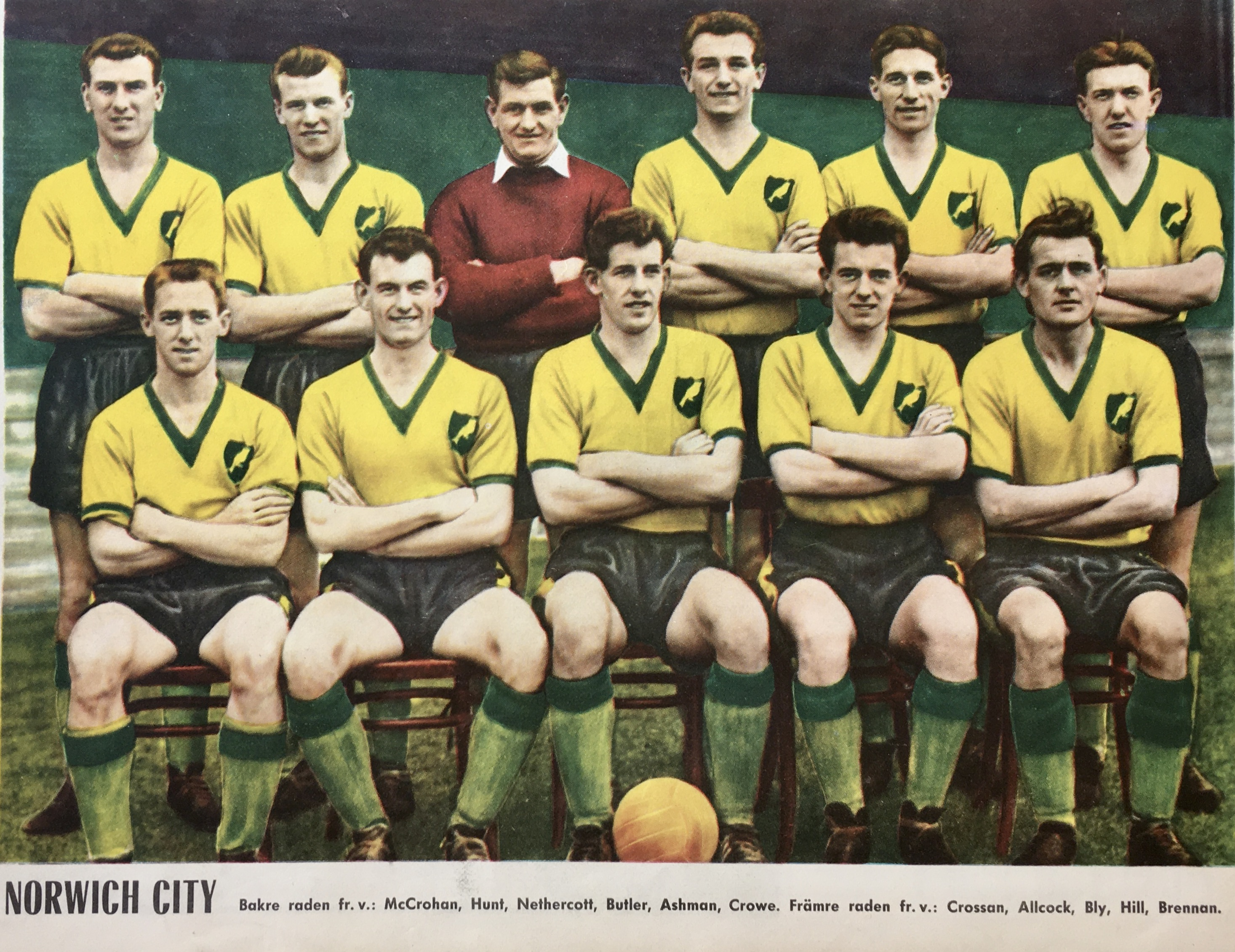
Norwich City F.C. in 1959 with – from left, standing: Roy McCrohan, Ralph Hunt, Ken Nethercott, Barry Butler, Ron Ashman, Matt Crowe; crouched from left: Errol Crossan, Terry Allcock, Terry Bly, Jimmy Hill and Bobby Brennan.

Terence Geoffrey Bly (22 October 1935 – 24 September 2009) was an English football striker.

== Career ==
He was renowned for his goalscoring prowess, most notably for Norwich City and Peterborough United, scoring a record 54 goals in the latter's inaugural Football League season of 1960–61. He then played for Coventry City and Notts County before joining Grantham in October 1964.

== Coaching career ==
Although he retired from playing in April 1970, he continued to manage Grantham Town until 1978.

== Death ==
Bly died on 24 September 2009, as a result of a heart attack.
