= Ron Ashman =

English footballer (1926–2004)

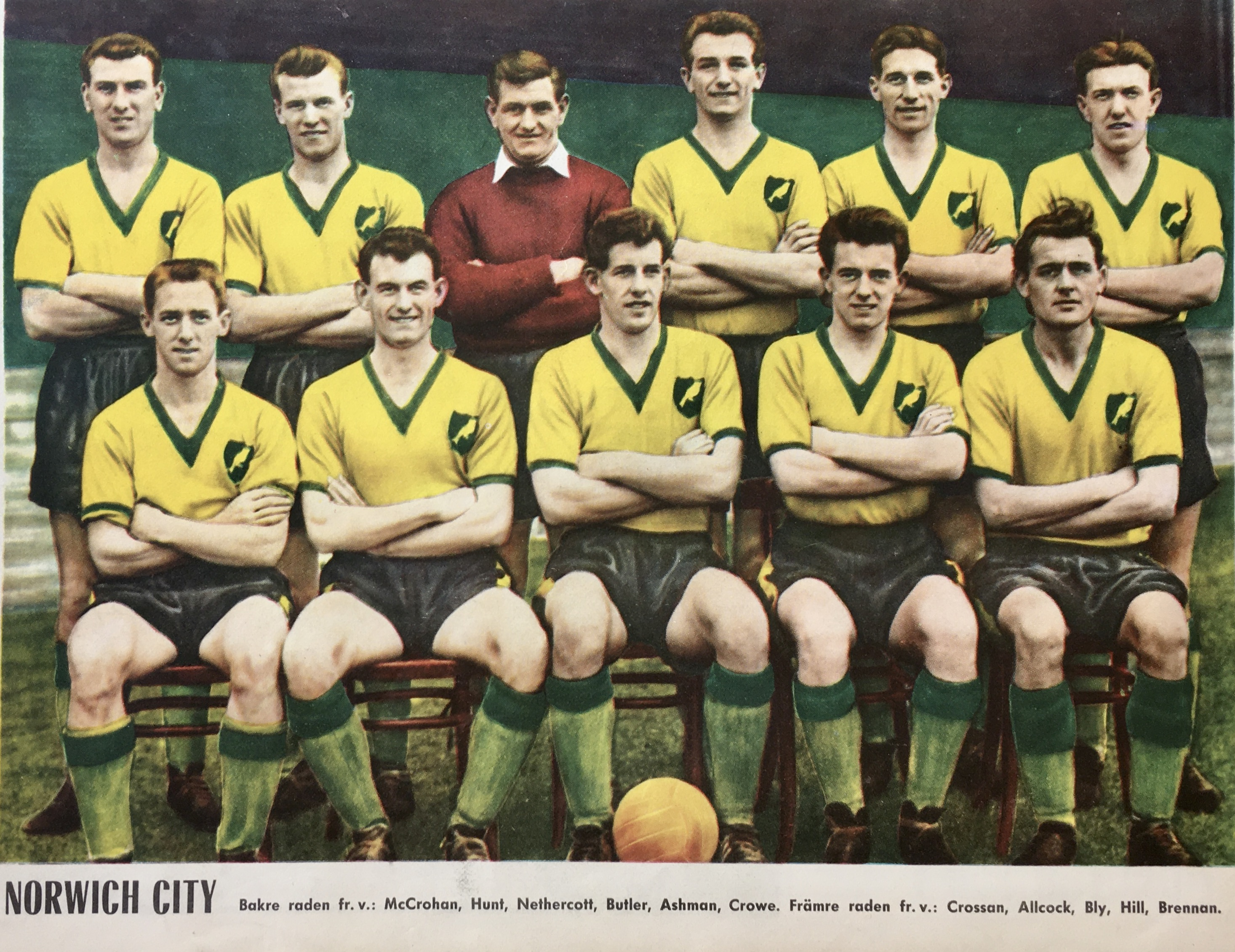
- Norwich City in 1959 with – from left, standing: Roy McCrohan, Ralph Hunt, Ken Nethercott, Barry Butler, Ron Ashman, Matt Crowe; sitting from left: Errol Crossan, Terry Allcock, Terry Bly, Jimmy Hill and Bobby Brennan.

Personal information
- Full name: Ronald George Ashman
- Date of birth: 19 May 1926
- Place of birth: Whittlesey, England
- Date of death: 21 June 2004 (aged 78)
- Place of death: Scunthorpe, England
- Positions: Centre-forward; full-back

Senior career*
Years	Team	Apps	(Gls)
1947–1963	Norwich City	592	(55)
1945–1946	→ Peterborough United (loan)	19	(3)
Total		611	(58)

Managerial career
- 1962–1966: Norwich City
- 1967–1973: Scunthorpe United
- 1973–1975: Grimsby Town
- 1976–1981: Scunthorpe United
- * Club domestic league appearances and goals

Ronald George Ashman (19 May 1926 – 21 June 2004) was an English professional football player and manager. He spent his entire playing career with Norwich City and was later their manager. He went on to manage Scunthorpe United and Grimsby Town.

== Playing career ==
Ashman was born in Whittlesey, Cambridgeshire. He played 662 games for Norwich City, scoring 56 goals. 592 of those games were league appearances – a club record. He made his debut at Carrow Road against Aldershot on 4 October 1947. Ashman was a centre-forward at that early stage of his career, but went on to play at full-back for many years. He was the captain of the Norwich team that reached the semi-finals of the FA Cup in 1959 as a Third Division side, won promotion to the Second Division in 1960 and won the League Cup in 1962.

He was selected to play for the Third Division South team against the North in 1955–56.

== Managerial career ==
When George Swindin resigned as Norwich City manager in November 1962, Ashman was appointed acting manager and was eventually given the job on a permanent basis on Boxing Day 1963. By then, he had played his last game for the club on 19 October 1963. Ashman remained manager until the end of the 1965–66 season, when his departure ended twenty years of service to the club.

Ashman then took over at Scunthorpe United in October 1967, but he was unable to arrest their slide and their 1967–68 Third Division season ended in relegation. Until Paul Hurst matched the feat in 2019, Ashman remained the only Scunthorpe manager to have lost all of his opening three games in charge.

During their following 1968–69 Fourth Division campaign, Ashman gave a professional debut to future England captain and manager Kevin Keegan. All of Keegan's 141 appearances for the club came under Ashman's management, and in his 2018 autobiography Keegan described Ashman as "a man who deserved a great deal of respect." Ashman personally drove Keegan to Anfield after negotiating a £33,000 sale for him, having famously asked the midfielder: "Have you got a good suit? Well, you're going to need one. Where you're heading, you're going to need to look smart."

Despite having lost both Keegan and star striker Nigel Cassidy, and having finished a lowly 17th the season prior, Ashman masterminded an against-the-odds promotion for Scunthorpe out of the Fourth Division in 1971–72, with a then joint-club record 15-game unbeaten stretch either side of Christmas.

Despite being unable to keep Scunthorpe in the Third Division the following season, this promotion was enough to persuade arch-rivals Grimsby Town of Ashman's talents and they duly poached him as manager in June 1973. It was claimed that Ashman "never enjoyed the same admiration he had gained in Scunthorpe", but in his only full season in charge at Blundell Park, 1971–72 Ron led The Mariners to a very respectable 6th-place finish in the Third Division. But with Town sat a disappointing 18th the following February, Ashman was duly relieved of his services.

Ashman managed 87 games in charge of Grimsby; of which The Mariners won 31, drew 25 and lost 31. Remarkably, Grimsby both scored and conceded exactly 114 goals during this reign. After 11 months out of the game, Ashman returned to the Old Showground for his second spell as Scunthorpe manager in January 1976.

It was arguably during the remainder of Scunthorpe's 1975–76 Fourth Division season that Ashman achieved his greatest managerial coup. With The Iron having finished rock-bottom of the entire Football League the season before and sitting six points adrift of avoiding a successive re-election application when Ashman returned, he masterminded a great escape and eventual 19th-place finish. This was in large part thanks to a run of seven wins and five draws across March and April, with official club historian John Staff stating that Ashman's efforts "deserved a medal".

Alongside assistant John Kaye, Ashman continued to find and develop a number of high-profile players, including future European Cup winner Richard Money, Scunthorpe's all-time club-record goalscorer Steve Cammack and famous England cricket all-rounder Ian Botham. With the club struggling both on and off the field however, Kaye was made redundant in February 1981, before Ashman was "moved upstairs" to the role of General Manager the following month.

Across his two spells in charge, Ashman was manager of Scunthorpe for 11 years and 576 games. The latter remains an all-time club record, four games ahead of second-placed Brian Laws.

== Personal life ==
Less than a year after his appointment as General Manager and with the club rumoured to be on the verge of bankruptcy, it was confirmed that Ashman had been formally made redundant from his role, alongside the club's secretary and physiotherapist.

This was his last role within football and Ashman instead ran a travel agents' shop on Scunthorpe High Street, which was opened by his former player Kevin Keegan and often advertised in Scunthorpe United's official match programmes.

In 2002, Ashman was made an inaugural member of the Norwich City F.C. Hall of Fame, whilst prior to his death in 2004, he was also an official Vice-President of Scunthorpe United and was a regular at both the club's matches and shareholder meetings.

== Honours ==
Norwich City

- Football League Cup: 1961–62
