= Ken Foggo =

Scottish footballer

Personal information
- Full name: Kenneth Taylor Foggo
- Date of birth: 7 November 1943 (age 82)
- Place of birth: Perth, Scotland
- Height: 5 ft 5 in (1.65 m)
- Position: Winger

Youth career
- Peebles YMCA
- 1959–1960: West Bromwich Albion (amateur)

Senior career*
Years	Team	Apps	(Gls)
1960–1967	West Bromwich Albion	129	(29)
1967–1973	Norwich City	185	(54)
1973–1975	Portsmouth	60	(3)
1975–1976	Southend United	30	(6)
1976–1980	Chelmsford City		
Total		404	(92)

International career
- Scotland Schoolboys
- * Club domestic league appearances and goals

Kenneth Taylor Foggo (born 7 November 1943) is a Scottish former footballer.

== Career ==
He started his football career with West Bromwich Albion but is best remembered for his time with Norwich City, for which he played from 1967 to 1972. While playing for Norwich as a winger, he won the Player of the Year award twice and was the team's top scorer in three successive years. He was a member of the Norwich team that won the Second Division championship in 1972 and promotion to the top division for the first time in the club's history.

After leaving Norwich in 1972 he played for Portsmouth and Southend United.

== Honours ==
West Bromwich Albion

- Football League Cup runner-up: 1966–67
