= 1963–64 Everton F.C. season =

English football club season

Everton
1963–64 season
- Manager: Harry Catterick
- Ground: Goodison Park
- First Division: 3rd
- FA Cup: Fifth Round
- European Cup: First Round
- FA Charity Shield: Winners
- Top goalscorer: League: Roy Vernon (18); All: Roy Vernon (21)

During the 1963–64 English football season, Everton F.C. competed in the Football League First Division.

== Final league table ==
Pos	Team	Pld	W	D	L	GF	GA	GAv	Pts	Qualification or relegation
1	Liverpool (C)	42	26	5	11	92	45	2.044	57	Qualification for the European Cup preliminary round
2	Manchester United	42	23	7	12	90	62	1.452	53	Qualification for the Inter-Cities Fairs Cup first round
3	Everton	42	21	10	11	84	64	1.313	52	Qualification for the Inter-Cities Fairs Cup first round
4	Tottenham Hotspur	42	22	7	13	97	81	1.198	51	
5	Chelsea	42	20	10	12	72	56	1.286	50	

Source: World Football
Rules for classification: 1) Points; 2) Goal average; 3) Goals scored
(C) Champions

== Results ==
Win	Draw	Loss

=== Charity Shield ===
Date	Opponent	Venue	Result	Attendance	Scorers
17 August 1963	Manchester United	H	4–0	54,844	Gabriel, Stevens, Vernon, Temple

=== Football League First Division ===
Date	Opponent	Venue	Result	Attendance	Scorers
24 August 1963	Fulham	H	3–0	49,520	
31 August 1963	Manchester United	A	1–5	63,206	
4 September 1963	Bolton Wanderers	A	3–1	34,093	
7 September 1963	Burnley	H	3–4	54,409	
11 September 1963	Bolton Wanderers	H	2–0	48,301	
14 September 1963	Ipswich Town	A	0–0	20,099	
21 September 1963	Sheffield Wednesday	H	3–2	48,884	
28 September 1963	Liverpool	A	1–2	51,976	
2 October 1963	Arsenal	H	2–1	51,829	
5 October 1963	Birmingham City	A	2–0	23,593	
7 October 1963	Aston Villa	A	1–0	23,999	
15 October 1963	Sheffield United	H	4–1	51,291	
19 October 1963	West Ham United	A	2–4	25,163	
26 October 1963	Tottenham Hotspur	H	1–0	65,386	
2 November 1963	Blackpool	A	1–1	24,834	
9 November 1963	Blackburn Rovers	H	2–4	49,349	
16 November 1963	Nottingham Forest	A	2–2	27,027	
23 November 1963	Stoke City	H	2–0	47,957	
30 November 1963	Wolverhampton Wanderers	A	0–0	25,133	
7 December 1963	Chelsea	H	1–1	39,320	
10 December 1963	Arsenal	A	0–6	33,644	
14 December 1963	Fulham	A	2–2	17,860	
21 December 1963	Manchester United	H	4–0	48,027	
26 December 1963	Leicester City	A	0–2	30,004	
28 December 1963	Leicester City	H	0–3	54,808	
11 January 1964	Burnley	A	3–2	23,082	
18 January 1964	Ipswich Town	H	1–1	38,242	
1 February 1964	Sheffield Wednesday	A	3–0	29,950	
8 February 1964	Liverpool	H	3–1	66,515	
18 February 1964	Birmingham City	H	3–0	36,252	
22 February 1964	Sheffield United	A	0–0	20,032	
28 February 1964	Aston Villa	H	4–2	50,292	
7 March 1964	Tottenham Hotspur	A	4–2	41,926	
14 March 1964	Nottingham Forest	H	6–1	50,085	
21 March 1964	Blackburn Rovers	A	2–1	35,142	
27 March 1964	West Bromwich Albion	H	1–1	65,197	
28 March 1964	Blackpool	H	3–1	49,504	
31 March 1964	West Bromwich Albion	A	2–4	38,194	
4 April 1964	Stoke City	A	2–3	35,297	
11 April 1964	Wolverhampton Wanderers	H	3–3	43,165	
18 April 1964	Chelsea	A	0–1	37,963	
25 April 1964	West Ham United	H	2–0	33,060	

=== FA Cup ===
Round	Date	Opponent	Venue	Result	Attendance	Goalscorers
3	4 January 1964	Hull City	A	1–1	36,478	
3:R	7 January 1964	Hull City	H	2–1	56,613	
4	25 January 1964	Leeds United	A	1–1	48,826	
4:R	28 January 1964	Leeds United	H	2–0	66,167	
5	15 February 1964	Sunderland	A	1–3	63,817	

=== European Cup ===
Round	Date	Opponent	Venue	Result	Attendance	Goalscorers
1:1	18 September 1963	(Italy) Internazionale	H	0–0	62,408	
1:2	25 September 1963	(Italy) Internazionale	A	0–1	59,701	
