= On the Ball, City =

Norwich City F.C song

"On The Ball, City" (sometimes abbreviated 'OTBC' in writing) is a football chant sung by fans of Norwich City F.C. It has been described as the world's oldest football chant still in use today.

== Background ==
The song is in fact older than the club itself having probably been penned for Norwich Teachers or Caley's FC in the 1890s, and used by clubs such as Swifians and Norwich CEYMS before being adopted by Norwich City. The writer of the song is often attributed to Albert T Smith who became a director of Norwich City in 1905 after the club was founded in 1902, and the song was adopted by fans of the club. It is sung pre-match at Carrow Road and throughout the games that Norwich City play, home and away. Although the first use of the tune and song is disputed, it may have been adopted by 1902 and it remains in use today in part if not the whole.

With a few minor revisions, notably adding the word "it" into the phrases "kick off" and "throw in", what is currently sung is a modification of the original refrain:

Kick it off, throw it in, have a little scrimmage,

Keep it low, a splendid rush, bravo, win or die;

On the ball, City, never mind the danger,

Steady on, now's your chance,

Hurrah! We've scored a goal,

City! City! City!

== Lyrics ==
In the days to call, which we've left behind,
Our boyhood’s glorious game,
And our youthful vigour has declined
With its mirth and its lonesome end;
You will think of the time, the happy time,
Its memories fond recall
When in the bloom of your youthful prime
We’ve kept upon the ball

Kick off, throw in, have a little scrimmage,
Keep it low, a splendid rush, bravo, win or die;
On the ball, City!
Never mind the danger,
Steady on, now’s your chance,
Hurrah! We’ve scored a goal.

Let all tonight then drink with me
To the football game we love,
And wish it may successful be
As other games of old,
And in one grand united toast
Join player, game and song
And fondly pledge your pride and toast
Success to the City club.

Kick off, throw in, have a little scrimmage,
Keep it low, a splendid rush, bravo, win or die;
On the ball, City!
Never mind the danger,
Steady on, now’s your chance,
Hurrah! We’ve scored a goal.
