= Cecil Potter =

English football manager

Cecil Bertram Potter (14 November 1888 – 17 October 1975) was an English professional football player and manager.

Born in West Hoathly, West Sussex, he played for Melton, Ipswich Town and Norwich City. Potter served in World War I, and played for Tottenham Hostpur during this period. After a spell with Hull City. He began his managerial career as a player-manager for Hartlepools United in 1920 and led the club into its inaugural Football League season. He subsequently managed Derby County. He succeeded Herbert Chapman at Huddersfield Town and secured the club's third successive First Division title. He left the club in 1926, joining former club Norwich City of the Third Division South, remaining in this role until 1929.

== Early life and playing career ==
Cecil Bertram Potter was born on 14 November 1888 in West Hoathly.

He began his footballing career with local team Melton. Potter then signed for then-amateur club Ipswich Town. Ahead of the 1911–12 season, he signed for professional Southern Football League club Norwich City after a successful trial. He played 133 times scoring 33 goals during his spell with Norwich. World War I interrupted Potter's footballing career. During the war, Potter served as a sergeant in the Royal Flying Corps. He played for the 17th Footballers' Battalion Middlesex Regiment as well as Tottenham Hotspur during this period.

When the war ended, Potter earned a move to Second Division club Hull City ahead of the 1919–20 season. He made ten appearances for Hull City in total.

== Coaching career ==
On 1 May 1920, he was appointed as player-manager of North Eastern League side Hartlepools United at the age of 31. Potter played for the club at half-back. In January 1921, Potter suffered a serious ankle injury, effectively ending his playing career. In March 1921, the club's directors decided to effectively demote Potter to secretary-manager in a surprise move. He led the club into their first season in the Football League and oversaw Hartlepools' first Football League match, a win against Wrexham. The club experienced positive form during the winter period, eventually finishing their inaugural campaign in 4th position. He played one match for the club that season, in the FA Cup. He left Hartlepools on 1 July 1922, taking a position at Second Division club Derby County.

Potter failed to earn promotion to the First Division and subsequently left the club. After working as a dairy farmer in Sussex, Potter succeeded Herbert Chapman at Huddersfield Town ahead of the 1925–26 season. Huddersfield had won the two previous First Division titles prior to Chapman's departure to Arsenal. Potter won a third successive First Division title for the club in his first season, finishing five points clear of Arsenal. However, Potter resigned the role in August 1926, citing 'failing health and that of his family'.

He moved back into management in November 1926, joining former club Norwich City of the Third Division South. He left the club in January 1929 after a 5–0 FA Cup third round home defeat to amateur side Corinthians.

He died on 17 October 1975 in Sutton at the age of 87.

== Honours ==
=== As a manager ===
Huddersfield Town

- Football League First Division: 1925–26

== See also ==
- List of English football championship winning managers
