= Cyril Turton =

English footballer (1921–2000)

Personal information
- Date of birth: 20 September 1921
- Place of birth: South Kirkby, England
- Date of death: January 2000 (aged 78)
- Place of death: North Yorkshire, England
- Position: Centre half

Youth career
- Frickley Colliery

Senior career*
Years	Team	Apps	(Gls)
1944–1946	Frickley Colliery		
1946–1954	Sheffield Wednesday	151	(0)
1954–1955	Goole Town		
1956–????	Frickley Colliery		
- * Club domestic league appearances and goals

Cyril Turton (20 September 1921 – January 2000) was an English footballer who played as a centre back for Frickley Colliery and Sheffield Wednesday.

== Playing career ==
Turton began his football career as an amateur for Frickley Colliery where he played for two years before turning professional, with the club beating off interest from several Football League clubs to retain his services. In 1946 he joined Sheffield Wednesday, where he went on to make over 150 Football League and FA Cup appearances. Despite becoming a regular between 1947 and 1949 Turton fell out of favour and made his first appearance in 18 months in November 1950. In January 1951 it was revealed by Eric Taylor that Turton had asked (not for the first time) to be placed on the transfer list as he felt that the Hillsborough crowd was against him. Despite this, Turton stayed with Sheffield Wednesday and once again became a first team regular, until losing his place in the team again in 1953. In December 1953, he made his first Football League appearance for the club since April, with the club deciding to let him go in May 1954. Turton next joined Goole Town, where he was an ever-present in the team until December 1954 when he was struck down by flu and he retired from playing that season.

== Non-playing career ==
Following his retirement from playing Turton returned to his first club, Frickley Colliery, as trainer. In October 1956 he was forced to come out of retirement as a player due to injuries at the club, with his form being so good that he retained his place in the first team.
