= Johnny Gavin (footballer) =

Irish footballer (1928–2007)

Personal information
- Full name: John Thomas Gavin
- Date of birth: 20 April 1928
- Place of birth: Limerick, Ireland
- Date of death: 20 September 2007 (aged 79)
- Position: Winger

Youth career
- Jamesborough United

Senior career*
Years	Team	Apps	(Gls)
1947–1948	Limerick	14	(5)
1948–1954	Norwich City	203	(76)
1954–1955	Tottenham Hotspur	32	(15)
1955–1958	Norwich City	109	(46)
1958–1959	Watford	43	(12)
1959–1961	Crystal Palace	66	(15)
1961–1962	Cambridge City		
1962–1963	Newmarket Town		
1967–1968	Fulbourn Institute		

International career
1949–1956	Ireland	7	(2)
- * Club domestic league appearances and goals

John Thomas Gavin (20 April 1928 – 20 September 2007) was an Irish footballer who spent most of his career in England. He played for Janesboro United, Limerick, Ireland, Norwich City, Watford, Tottenham Hotspur, Crystal Palace, Cambridge City, Newmarket Town and Fulbourn.

Born in Limerick, Gavin was working as a painter on the Irish railways and playing for Limerick when he was approached in 1948 by Norwich City manager Doug Lochhead. West Ham United were also keen on signing Gavin but he chose Norwich because his friend and Limerick team-mate Kevin Holman had already agreed to join the club, meaning that Gavin would have familiar company to help him settle in Norfolk when he left Ireland. Holman would never play in Norwich's first team, while Gavin would go on to become Norwich City's record goalscorer, scoring 132 goals in 338 matches. Norwich had paid just £1,500 for his services and his club goalscoring record stands to this day.

His scoring feats earned the attention of Tottenham Hotspur, who signed him from Norwich in October 1954. Despite an impressive strike-rate of 15 goals in 32 games Gavin did not settle at White Hart Lane and returned to Norwich in November 1955 as part of the deal that took future England centre-half Maurice Norman to Tottenham from Norwich. He scored his 100th goal for Norwich on 15 September 1956 in a 3–0 win against Plymouth Argyle at Carrow Road. He was selected to play for the Third Division South representative team in 1956–57.

When interviewed for Norwich City FC's centenary in 2002, Gavin recalled that he enjoyed regular banter with the Norwich crowd during games — "I got a little bit of jip from them but gave some back."

After retiring, Gavin ran a public house for several years in Cambridge, where he lived until his death. In his 2002 updated edition of Canary Citizens, Mike Davage reported that Gavin's health had suffered in his later years and that he had had a hip replacement and suffered from Osteoarthritis.

In 2002, Gavin was made an inaugural member of the Norwich City F.C. Hall of Fame.

Gavin's death was announced on 20 September 2007: he was 79.

Norwich's next home game against Sheffield Wednesday on 29 September was preceded by a minute's applause and the players wore black armbands.
