= Norwich City F.C. =

Association football club in Norwich, England

Norwich City
- Full name: Norwich City Football Club
- Nicknames: The Canaries; Yellows
- Founded: 17 June 1902; 124 years ago
- Ground: Carrow Road
- Capacity: 27,150
- Owner: Norfolk FB Holdings LLC
- Majority shareholder: Mark Attanasio
- Head Coach: Philippe Clement
- League: EFL Championship
- 2025–26: EFL Championship, 9th of 24
- Website: canaries.co.uk
Home colours	Away colours	Third colours

Norwich City Football Club is a professional football club based in Norwich, Norfolk, England. The club competes in the EFL Championship, the second tier of English football.

Norwich City was founded in 1902, and since 1935, Norwich have played their home games at Carrow Road and have a long-standing rivalry with East Anglian rivals Ipswich Town, with whom they contest the East Anglian derby. Norwich have won the League Cup twice, in 1962 and 1985. The club's highest-ever league finish came in the 1992–93 season when they finished third in the Premier League. Norwich have featured in the UEFA Cup once, in the 1993–94 season, where they were defeated in the third round, but en route became the only English club to defeat German team Bayern Munich at the Olympiastadion in Munich.

The club is nicknamed The Canaries after the history of breeding the birds in the area, which is represented by the canary in the team's badge and traditionally yellow-and-green home kits. The fans' song "On the Ball, City" written in the 1890s, is the oldest football chant in the world, still in use today.

== History ==
=== Early years (1902–1934) ===
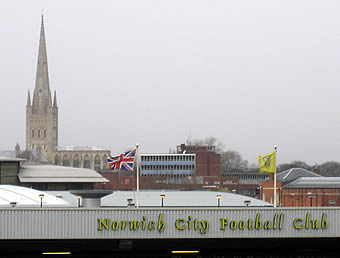
View from Carrow Road towards the city, with Norwich Cathedral in the background

Norwich City F.C. was formed after a meeting at the Criterion Café in Norwich on 17 June 1902 and played their first competitive match, against Harwich & Parkeston, at Newmarket Road on 6 September 1902. They joined the Norfolk & Suffolk League for the 1902–03 season, but following a FA commission, the club was ousted from the amateur game in 1905, as it was deemed a professional organisation. Later that year Norwich were elected to play in the Southern League. With increasing crowds, they were forced to leave Newmarket Road in 1908 and moved to The Nest, a disused chalk pit. The club's original nickname was the Citizens, but this was superseded by 1907 by the Canaries after the club's chairman (who was a keen breeder of canaries) dubbed his boys "The Canaries" and changed their strip to yellow and green. During the First World War, with football suspended and facing spiralling debts, City went into voluntary liquidation on 10 December 1917.

The club was officially reformed on 15 February 1919 – a key figure in the event was Charles Frederick Watling, future lord mayor of Norwich and the father of future club chairman, Geoffrey Watling. When the Football League formed a third Division in May 1920, Norwich joined the Third Division for the following season. Their first league fixture, against Plymouth Argyle, on 28 August 1920, ended in a 1–1 draw. The club went on to endure a mediocre decade, finishing no higher than eighth but no lower than 18th. The following decade proved more successful for the club with a club-record victory, 10–2, over Coventry City. Norwich were promoted as champions to the Second Division in the 1933–34 season under the management of Tom Parker.

=== Move to Carrow Road and an FA Cup semi-final (1934–1959) ===
With crowds continuing to rise, and with the Football Association raising concerns over the suitability of The Nest, the club considered renovation of the ground, but ultimately decided on a move to Carrow Road. The inaugural match, on 31 August 1935 against West Ham United, ended in a 4–3 victory for the home team and set a new record attendance of 29,779. The biggest highlight of the following four seasons was the visit of King George VI to Carrow Road on 29 October 1938. However the club was relegated to the Third Division at the end of the season.

The league was suspended the following season due to the Second World War, and did not resume until the 1946–47 season. City finished this and the following season in 21st place, the poor results forcing the club to apply for re-election to the league. The club narrowly missed out on promotion under the guidance of manager Norman Low in the early 1950s, but following the return of Tom Parker as manager, Norwich finished bottom of the football league in the 1956–57 season.

Events off the field were to overshadow the team's performances as the club faced financial difficulties severe enough to render them non-viable. With debts amounting to more than £20,000, the club was rescued by the formation of a new board, chaired by Geoffrey Watling and the creation of an appeal fund chaired by the Lord Mayor of Norwich, Arthur South, which raised more than £20,000. For these and other services to the club, both men (now deceased) were later honoured by having stands named after them at Carrow Road. (Note: The South Stand was later renamed the Jarrold Stand. See Carrow Road#Stands)

Archie Macaulay became manager when the club was reformed and he oversaw one of the club's greatest achievements, its run to the semi-final of the 1958–59 FA Cup. Competing as a Third Division team, Norwich defeated two First Division opponents along the way, notably a 3–0 win against the Manchester United "Busby Babes". City lost the semi-final only after a replay against another First Division team, Luton Town. The team of 1958–59 – including Terry Bly who scored seven goals in the run, and Ken Nethercott who played most of the second half of one match in goal despite a dislocated shoulder – is today well represented in the club Hall of Fame. The "59 Cup Run" as it is now known locally, "remains as one of the truly great periods in Norwich City's history". Norwich were the third-ever Third Division team to reach the FA Cup semi-final.

=== League Cup glory and a place in the First Division (1959–1980) ===
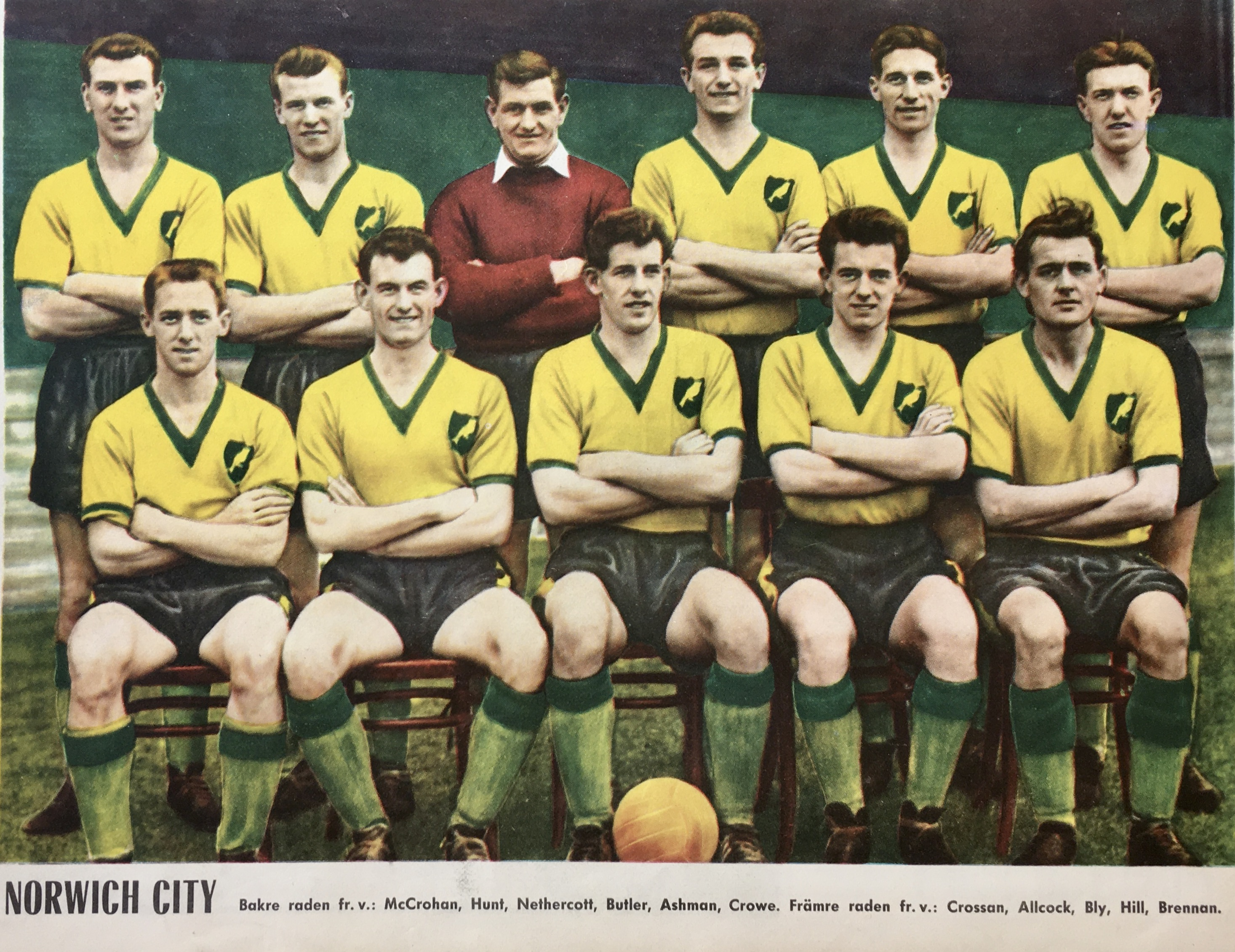
Norwich City F.C. in 1959 with; from left, standing. Roy McCrohan, Hunt, Ken Nethercott, Butler, Ron Ashman, Crowe; seated from left: Crossan, Terry Allcock, Terry Bly, Hill, Brennan.

In the 1959–60 season, Norwich were promoted to the Second Division after finishing second to Southampton, and achieved a fourth-place finish in the 1960–61 season. In 1962 Ron Ashman guided Norwich to their first trophy, defeating Rochdale 4–0 on aggregate in a two-legged final to win the League Cup.

Sixth place in the league was the closest the club came to promotion to the First Division again during the 1960s, but after winning the division in the 1971–72 season under manager Ron Saunders, Norwich City reached the highest level of English football for the first time. They made their first appearance at Wembley Stadium in 1973, losing the League Cup final 1–0 to Tottenham Hotspur.

Relegation to the Second Division in 1973–74 season came after Saunders had departed and been succeeded by John Bond, but the board of directors kept faith in Bond and were quickly rewarded. A highly successful first season saw promotion back to the First Division, and another visit to Wembley, again in the League Cup final, this time losing 1–0 to Aston Villa.

=== Promotion, silverware and more cup runs (1980–1992) ===
Bond departed to Manchester City in the autumn of 1980, and the club were relegated six months later, but bounced back the following season after finishing third under Bond's successor Ken Brown. In August 1981, Norwich City striker Justin Fashanu became the first black footballer to command a £1 million transfer fee when he was sold to Nottingham Forest.

The 1984–85 season was of mixed fortunes for the club; under Brown's guidance, they reached the final of the Football League Cup at Wembley Stadium, having defeated East Anglian rivals Ipswich Town in the semi-final. In the final, they beat Sunderland 1–0, but in the league, both Norwich and Sunderland were relegated to the second tier of English football, Norwich going down by only one point. This made Norwich the first English club to win a major trophy and suffer relegation in the same season; something which was not matched until Birmingham City also suffered relegation the season they won the League Cup 26 years later.

Norwich were also denied their first foray into Europe with the ban on English clubs after the Heysel Stadium disaster. City bounced back to the top flight by winning the Second Division championship in the 1985–86 season. This was the start a club-record nine consecutive seasons in the top division of English football.

A fifth place finish under Brown in 1987 and fourth place in 1989 under his successor Dave Stringer would have been enough for UEFA Cup qualification, but the ban on English clubs remained. They also had good cup runs during this period, reaching the FA Cup semi-finals in 1989 and again in 1992. Their unexpected title challenge alongside the cup run in the 1988-89 season turned them into surprise contenders for the double.

Stringer’s final season in charge saw them finish fifth from bottom in 1992, but it was enough to ensure that they would be founder members of the new Premier League for the 1992-93 season.

=== Early success in the Premier League era (1992–1995) ===
During 1992–93, the inaugural season of the Premier League, Norwich City quickly emerged as surprise title contenders, before faltering in the final weeks to finish third behind the champions, Manchester United, and runners-up Aston Villa. The following season Norwich participated in the UEFA Cup for the first (and only) time, losing in the third round to Inter Milan, but defeating Bayern Munich. Winning 2–1, Norwich were the first British team to beat Bayern Munich in the Olympiastadion.

Mike Walker quit as Norwich City manager in January 1994, to take charge of Everton and was replaced by first team coach John Deehan who led the club to 12th place in the 1993–94 season in the Premier League. Norwich began the 1994–95 season well, despite the pre-season departure of top scorer Chris Sutton to Blackburn Rovers for a British record fee of £5 million, and by Christmas they were seventh in the league. Norwich then won only one of their final 20 league games, and slumped to 20th place and relegation, ending a nine-season run in the top flight.

=== The First Division years (1995–2003) ===

2002 Football League First Division play-off final starting line-up

Shortly before relegation, Deehan resigned as manager and his assistant Gary Megson took over until the end of the season. Martin O'Neill, who had taken Wycombe Wanderers from the Conference to the Second Division with successive promotions, was appointed as Norwich City manager in summer 1995. He lasted just six months in the job before resigning after a dispute with chairman Robert Chase over money to strengthen the squad. Soon after, Chase stepped down after protests from supporters, who complained that he kept selling the club's best players and was to blame for their relegation. Chase's majority stakeholding was bought by Geoffrey Watling.

English television cook Delia Smith and husband Michael Wynn-Jones took over the majority of Norwich City's shares from Watling in 1996, and Mike Walker was re-appointed as the club's manager. He was unable to repeat the success achieved during his first spell and was dismissed two seasons later with Norwich mid-table in Division One. Nigel Worthington took over as Norwich City manager in December 2000 following an unsuccessful two years for the club under Bruce Rioch and then Bryan Hamilton. He had been on the coaching staff under Hamilton who resigned with the club 20th in the First Division and in real danger of relegation to the third tier of English football for the first time since the 1960s. Worthington avoided the threat of relegation and, the following season, led City to a play-off final at the Millennium Stadium, which Norwich lost against Birmingham City on penalties.

=== Return to the Premier League (2003–2009) ===
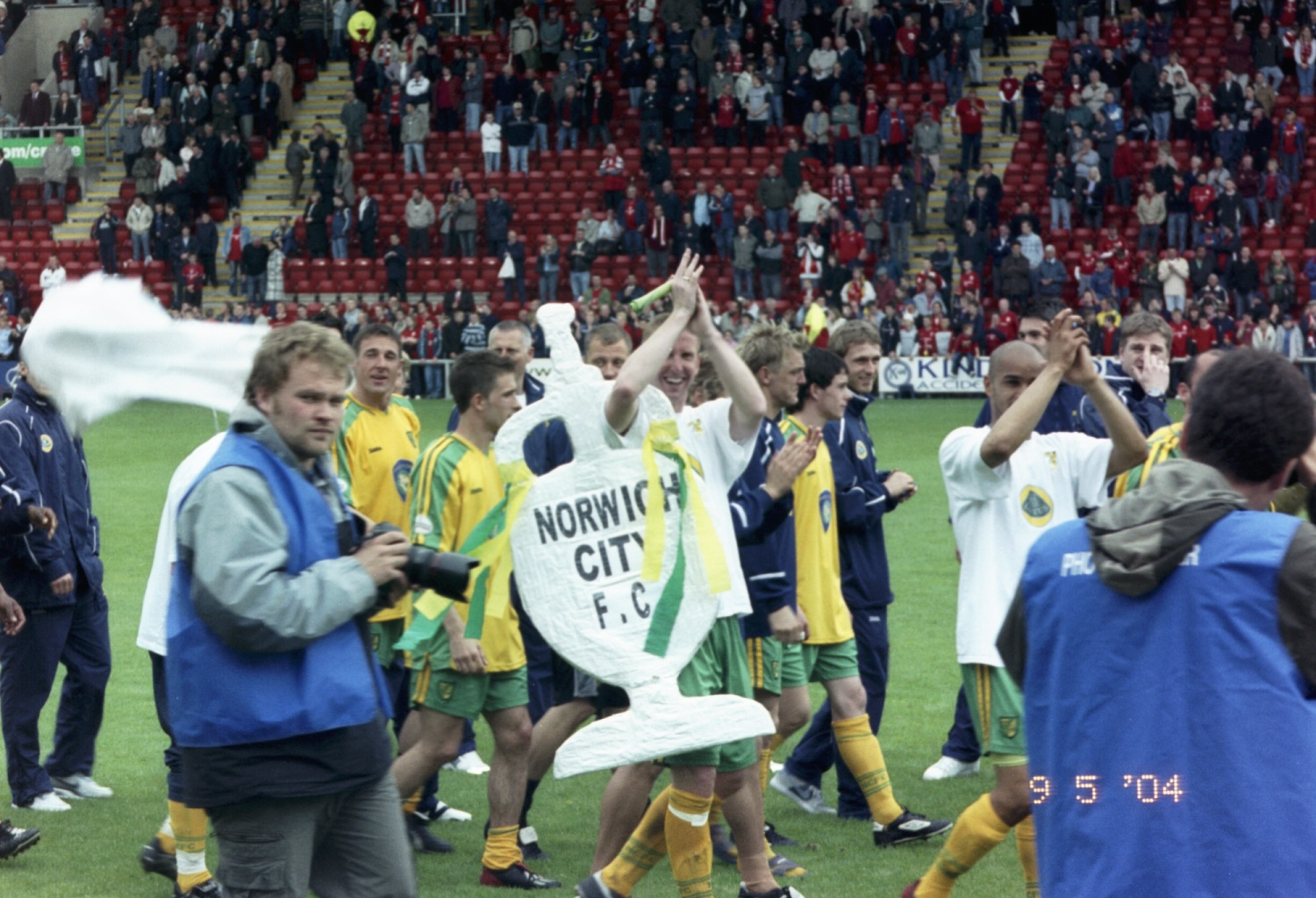
City players celebrate winning the First Division Championship, 2004

The 2003–04 season saw the club win the First Division title, finishing eight points clear of second-placed West Bromwich Albion and returned to the top flight for the first time since 1995. For much of the 2004–05 season, the club struggled and a last day 6–0 defeat away to Fulham condemned them to relegation. The club finished in ninth place in the Championship in the 2005–06 season and, as results in the 2006–07 season went against City, Worthington was dismissed in October 2006, directly after a 4–1 defeat by Burnley.

In October 2006, Norwich announced that former City player Peter Grant had left West Ham United to become the new manager. Grant's team struggled for most of the season and made a poor start to the 2007–08 season, with only two wins by mid October; following a 1–0 defeat at fellow-strugglers Queens Park Rangers, Grant left the club by mutual consent on in October 2007. Later the same month, former Newcastle United manager Glenn Roeder was confirmed as Grant's replacement. Roeder kept Norwich in the Championship with a 3–0 win over Queens Park Rangers, Norwich's penultimate game of the season.

=== Yo-yo years (2009–present) ===
In January 2009, Roeder was relieved of his duties as manager and, shortly after, former Norwich goalkeeper Bryan Gunn was appointed until the end of the season. However, he was unable to prevent the club from being relegated in May 2009, after a 4–2 defeat away to already relegated Charlton Athletic. Following their relegation, their first game of the season resulted in a 7–1 home defeat against East Anglian rivals Colchester United. This was the club's heaviest ever home defeat and Gunn was dismissed six days later.

On 18 August 2009, Paul Lambert was announced as the new manager, leaving his post at Colchester, and nine months later led Norwich to promotion back to the Championship as League One Champions, after a single season in League One. The following season saw Norwich promoted to the Premier League, finishing second in the table and completing the first back-to-back promotions from the third tier to second and to the first since Manchester City in 2000.

The club finished in 12th place in their first season back in the Premier League. However, Lambert resigned within a month of the season's close to take up the vacant managerial spot at league rivals Aston Villa and was replaced by Chris Hughton. Hughton led Norwich to an 11th-place finish, including a ten-game unbeaten run in the league, but they were relegated back to the Championship after the 2013–14 season. Hughton was dismissed to be replaced by former Norwich player Neil Adams.

After a mediocre first half of the 2014–15 season, Adams resigned in January 2015 and Hamilton Academical manager Alex Neil was appointed as Norwich manager four days later. The appointment reinvigorated Norwich's season, and victory in the 2015 Championship play-off final secured an immediate return to the top division of English football. This was only temporary relief, as at the end of the next season they were relegated again to play the 2016–17 season in the Championship.

The following season started successfully, with the club sitting top of the Championship in mid-October. However, a poor run of form and results followed and in March 2017, Neil was dismissed by the club. First-team coach Alan Irvine was placed in caretaker charge for the remainder of the season, ultimately finishing in eighth.

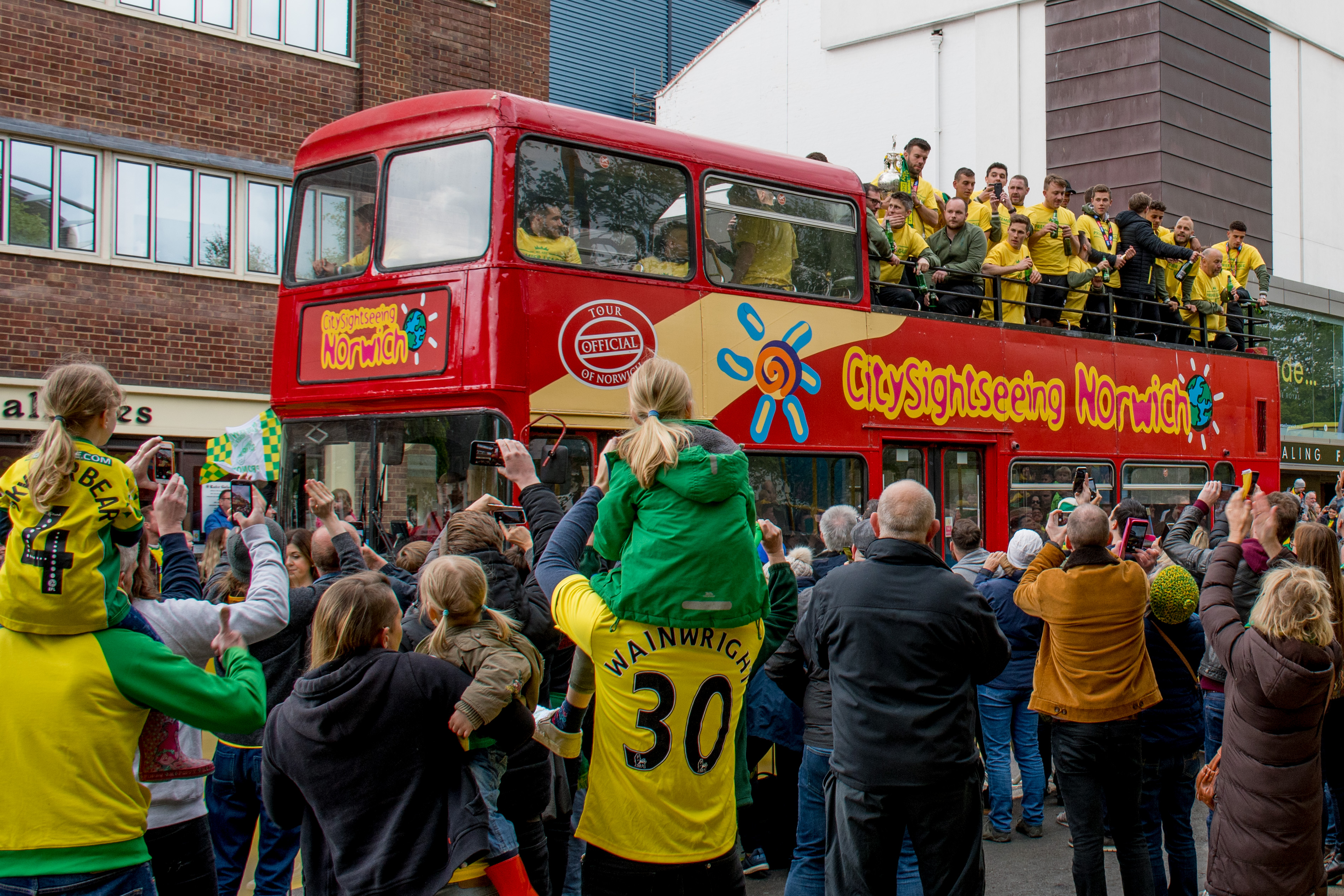
Norwich City promotion celebrations in 2019

In May 2017, the club appointed German coach Daniel Farke as head coach, becoming the first head coach of the club in its 114-year history that was not from the British Isles. In Farke's first season, Norwich finished in 14th place. The following season was far more successful; helped by top scorer Teemu Pukki, the club was promoted back to the Premier League after a three-year absence as Championship winners. However, Norwich were once again relegated back to the Championship after just a single season back in the top flight, becoming the first team in Premier League history to be relegated five times from the division. The yo-yo effect continued unabated: in May 2021, Norwich were crowned winners of the Championship, securing promotion back to the top flight at the first time of asking, but they failed to win a match in their first nine games back in the Premier League in the 2021–22 season, and Farke was dismissed by the club in November. On 14 November 2021, the club appointed former Walsall, Brentford and Aston Villa manager Dean Smith as their new head coach. Norwich completed a record sixth relegation from the Premier League, and, after an indifferent first half of the following season, Smith was dismissed in December 2022.

On 6 January 2023, the club appointed former Huddersfield Town, Schalke and Young Boys manager David Wagner as their new head coach. After a thirteenth-place finish under Wagner in the 2022-23 season, the club improved to a sixth-placed finish in 2023-24 and qualified for the Championship playoffs. However, on 17 May 2024, Wagner was dismissed by the club after fifteen months in charge following a 4–0 loss on aggregate against Leeds United in the playoff semi-finals.

On 30 May 2024, the club appointed Johannes Hoff Thorup as their new head coach, who joined from Danish Superliga club FC Nordsjælland on a three-year contract ahead of the 2024–25 season. On 22 April 2025, the club dismissed Thorup after only fourteen wins in forty seven games, with former Arsenal and England midfielder Jack Wilshere, who was previously appointed as a first team coach by the club in October 2024, taking charge for the remainder of the season. Wilshere also left the club on 24 May 2025 after being informed that he would not be appointed as the permanent head coach.

In June 2025, the club appointed Liam Manning as their new head coach on a four-year contract, after agreeing a compensation package with his former club Bristol City. Born in Norwich, Manning became the first person born in the city to manage the club, as well as the second Norfolk-born person to do so after Dave Stringer. However, Manning was dismissed by the club in November 2025 after fifteen games in charge with the club twenty-third in the Championship table and with no home wins in all competitions.

In August 2025, Marcelino Núñez became the first player since Andy Marshall in the 2001–02 season to transfer from the club to East Anglian rivals Ipswich Town in a deal worth £10m. In November 2025, the club appointed former Club Brugge, Monaco and Rangers manager Philippe Clement as their new head coach on a four-year contract.

== Colours and badge ==
City of Norwich Coat of Arms

Norwich City's nickname, "The Canaries", has long influenced the team's colours and badge. Originally, the club was nicknamed the "Citizens" ("Cits" for short), and played in light blue and white halved shirts, although the halves were inconsistent: the blue was on the left on some shirts, and on the right for others. The earliest known recorded link between the club and canaries comes in an interview recorded in the Eastern Daily Press with the newly appointed manager, John Bowman in April 1905. The paper quotes him saying "Well I knew of the City's existence ... I have ... heard of the canaries." "This as far as we can tell is the first time that the popular pastime of the day ie ... rearing ... canaries was linked with Norwich City FC... the club still played in blue and white, and would continue to do so for another two seasons" wrote one history of the club.

By February 1907, the nickname Canaries had come more into vogue; thoughts that an FA Cup tie against West Bromwich Albion (nicknamed "Throstles" after a bird) was "a bird -singing contest" were dismissed by the polymath C. B. Fry as "humbug" but the national press increasingly referred to the team as Canaries. The following season, to match the nickname, City played for the first time in Canary livery; "yellow shirts with green collars and cuffs. One paper produced the quote 'The Cits are dead but the Canaries are very much alive'." While the home colours of yellow and green remain to this day, the away colours have varied since introduction. For example, the away kit for the 2012–13 season was black shirts and shorts.

A simple canary badge was first adopted in 1922. The current club badge consists of a canary resting on a football with a stylised version of the City of Norwich arms in the top left corner. For the club's centenary celebrations in 2002, a special badge was designed, featuring two canaries looking left and right, plus a ribbon noting the centenary.

In November 2021, the club unveiled a new club badge that officially replaced the previous badge on all club branding from June 2022 and that would appear on club shirts from the 2022–23 season. It is a modernised version of its predecessor that removed black keylines around the badge, a redesigned version of the city's coat of arms that more closely resembles a lion and Norwich Castle, and a redesigned canary on a ball that's more centralised in the badge than its predecessor.

== Stadium ==
Norwich City played at Newmarket Road from 1902 to 1908, with a record attendance of 10,366 against Sheffield Wednesday in a second round FA Cup match in 1908. Following a dispute over the conditions of renting the Newmarket Road ground, in 1908 the club moved to a new home in a converted disused chalk pit in Rosary Road which became known as "The Nest". By the 1930s, the ground was too small for the growing crowds, and in 1935 the club moved to its current home in Carrow Road. The original stadium, "the largest construction job in the city since the building of Norwich Castle... was "miraculously" built in just 82 days... it was referred to [by club officials] as 'The eighth wonder of the world'" An aerial photograph from August 1935 shows three teams of open terracing and a covered stand, with a Colman's Mustard advertisement painted on its roof, visible only from the air. Another photograph, taken on a match day that same season, shows that a parking area was provided at the ground.

Floodlights were erected at the ground in 1956, but their cost of £9,000 nearly sent the club into bankruptcy. The success in the 1959 FA Cup secured the financial status of the club and allowed a cover to be built over the South Stand. This was itself replaced in 2003 when a new 7,000 seat South stand was built in its place and subsequently renamed the Jarrold Stand.

1963 saw the record attendance for Carrow Road, with a crowd of 43,984 for a 6th round FA Cup match against Leicester City. After the Ibrox disaster in 1971, safety licences were required by clubs and this drastically reduced the ground's capacity to around 20,000. A two-tier terrace was built at the River End, and seats began to replace the terraces. By 1979 the stadium had a capacity of 28,392 with seats for 12,675. A fire in 1984 partially destroyed one of the stands, which eventually led to its complete demolition and replacement by 1987 of a new City Stand, which chairman Robert Chase described as "Coming to a football match within the City Stand is very much like going to the theatre – the only difference being that our stage is covered with grass". After the Hillsborough disaster in 1989 and the subsequent outcome of the Taylor Report in 1990, the stadium was converted to all-seater. It has a capacity of 27,150.

== Supporters ==
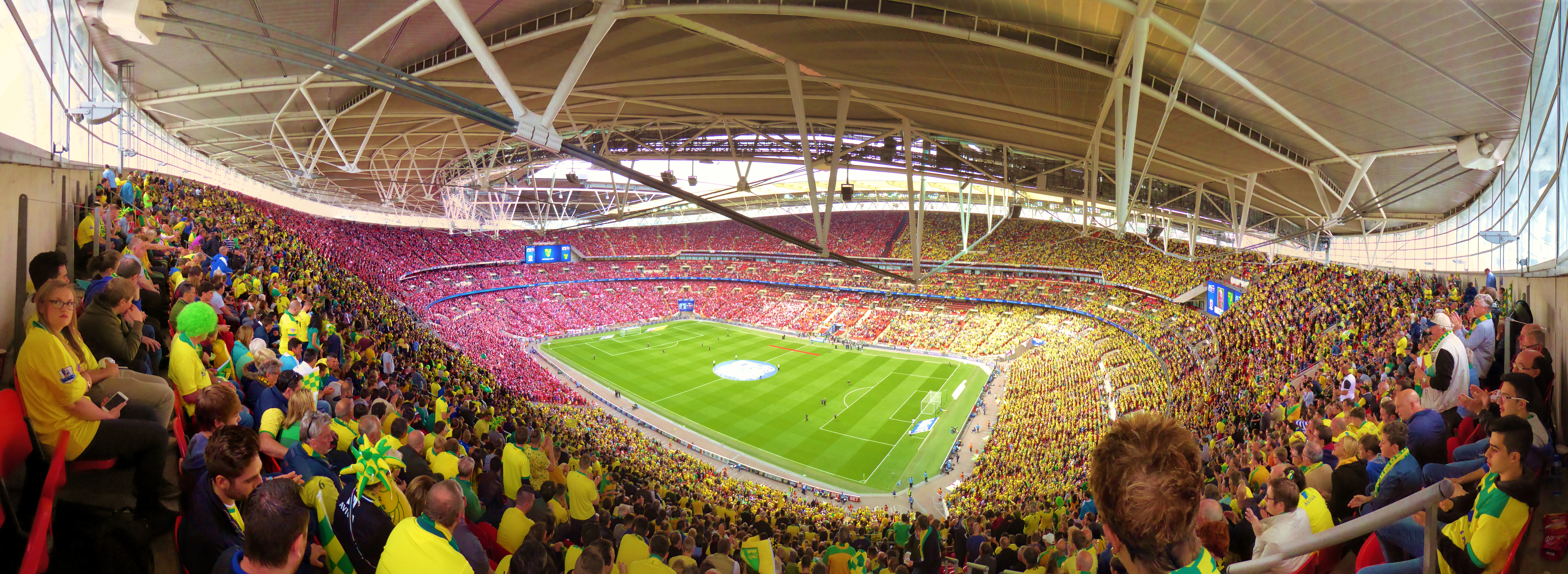
Norwich City fans at the 2015 play-off final at London's Wembley Stadium

=== Song ===
The fans' song, On the Ball, City, is the oldest football song in the world still in use today; the song is older than the club itself, having probably been penned for Norwich Teachers or Caley's FC in the 1890s and adapted for Norwich City. Although the first use of the tune and song is disputed, it had been adopted by 1902 and it remains in use today in part if not the whole. The chorus is:

Kick it off, throw it in, have a little scrimmage,

Keep it low, a splendid rush, bravo, win or die;
On the ball City, never mind the danger,
Steady on, now's your chance,
Hurrah! We've scored a goal,

City! clap-clap City! clap-clap City! clap-clap

=== People ===
While much of the support that the club enjoys is local, there are a number of expatriate fan clubs, notably in London and stretching from Scandinavia to countries further afield such as the United Arab Emirates, North Macedonia, Bermuda, Hong Kong, Thailand, Australia, and the United States. The London supporters' club is known as the Capital Canaries, and was founded in 1975. They gather at The Old Red Lion in The Angel, Islington to watch live games.

The club also maintains a healthy celebrity support with celebrity cook Delia Smith and comedian Stephen Fry both having moved from being fans of the club to running it. Actor Hugh Jackman is also a fan of the club, having been taken to Carrow Road as a child by his English mother, though he turned down an opportunity to become an investor in the club in 2010. Other well-known supporters include television presenter Simon Thomas, who is vice-president of the Norwich City Supporters Trust, Norfolk-born musician, model and media personality Myleene Klass, fiction author Philip Pullman, and former Labour politician Ed Balls. Journalist and broadcaster David Frost also declared his love for The Canaries during his lifetime.

In March 2018, supporters helped the club raise £5 million through a mini-bond investment scheme. The purpose of the mini-bond, called the Canaries Bond was to raise money to fund new academy facilities at Colney Training Ground for the Norwich City F.C. Under-23s and Academy.

=== Local rivalry ===
Historical league positions of local clubs; one of the bases for claims to the "Pride of Anglia" title

The club's main local rival is Ipswich Town. When Norwich and Ipswich meet it is known as the East Anglian derby, or, informally, as the "Old Farm Derby" – a comic reference to the Old Firm derby played between Scottish clubs Celtic and Rangers.

Locally, much is made of the informal title "Pride of Anglia". Fans variously claim the title for either winning the East Anglian derby, finishing highest in the league, having the better current league position or having the more successful club history.

== Current ownership ==
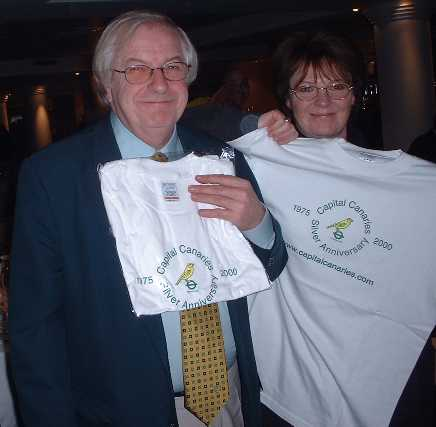
Former Majority Shareholders and current Honorary Life Presidents Michael Wynn-Jones & Delia Smith at a fans' event

Norwich City F.C. is a public limited company that, in 2003, comprised approximately 8,000 individual shareholdings. As of October 2024, the group Norfolk Holdings, led by American businessman and Milwaukee Brewers owner Mark Attanasio are the majority shareholders, having taken over from the former majority shareholders, English cook and television presenter Delia Smith and her husband, Welsh writer Michael Wynn-Jones, who had held the title since 1998.

At the 2006–07 Norwich City FC Annual General Meeting (on 18 January 2007), Smith and Wynn-Jones announced that they would be open to offers to buy their majority stake-holding in the club. They made clear that any prospective buyer would have to invest heavily in the squad, with regards to team improving.

The only way we would relinquish our shares is if somebody is going to put money into the football ... Only if they put money into the squad – not if they buy our shares, we don't want money. It has to be that there is money for the squad, serious money for the squad.

In September 2022, a general meeting of shareholders took place to discuss and voted for Milwaukee Brewers owner Mark Attanasio to be appointed as a director at the club. Attanasio was expected to buy the 15.9% stake in the club as was owned by Michael Foulger. It was later announced by the club he had purchased shares from a variety of holders, which included Foulger's shares, as part of his investment group, “Norfolk Holdings”. In April 2024, Attanasio's stake in the club was increased to 40.4% following EFL ratification, making him joint majority shareholder alongside Smith and Wynn-Jones.

On 12 August 2024, the club announced that a deal had been reached for Attanasio to increase his stake to 85% and take majority control of the club, subject to takeover panel and shareholder approval. As part of the deal, Smith and Wynn-Jones would also stand down from their respective roles as club directors and become honorary life presidents as well as reduce their stake in the club to 10%. The deal was approved by the clubs other shareholders at a general meeting on 23 October 2024 with Smith & Wynn-Jones stepping down from the board of directors with immediate effect, bringing their twenty-eight years of involvement with the club to an end.

In September 2026, Australian actor Hugh Jackman said in an interview with TalkSPORT that he was in talks to purchase a minority stake in the club. Jackman, who has been a supporter of the club since he was seven-years old due to his mother being born in the city, had previously turned down the opportunity to invest in the club in 2010.

== Records and statistics ==
Chart of Norwich's table positions since joining the Football League

Ashman holds the record for Norwich league appearances, having played 592 first-team matches between 1947 and 1964. Ralph Hunt holds the record for the most goals scored in a season, 31 in the 1955–56 season in the Third Division South, with Johnny Gavin the top scorer over a career – 122 between 1948 and 1955

The club's widest victory margin in the league was their 10–2 win against Coventry City in the Third Division South in 1930. Their heaviest defeat in the league was 10–2 against Swindon Town in 1908 in the Southern League.

Norwich's record home attendance is 43,984 for a sixth-round FA Cup match against Leicester City on 30 March 1963. In the wake of the Ibrox stadium disaster in 1971, government regulations resulted in the capacity being drastically reduced to around 20,000. After the Hillsborough disaster in 1989 and the subsequent Taylor Report in 1990, the stadium was converted to all-seater. As of July 2020, the capacity is 27,359. Norwich's highest transfer fee received is £33 million from Aston Villa for Emiliano Buendía in June 2021, while the most spent by the club on a player was for the signing of Christos Tzolis for £8.8 million from PAOK FC in August 2021.

Norwich's highest league finish was third in the Premier League in 1992–93. The 2021–22 season was Norwich's 27th in the top flight of English football. The club has won the League Cup twice (most recently in 1985) and reached the FA Cup semi-final three times, most recently in 1992. Norwich have taken part in European competition once, reaching the third round of the UEFA Cup in 1993–94 and are the only English team to beat Bayern Munich in the Olympiastadion.

== Players ==
=== First-team squad ===
As of 3 September 2026

Note: Flags indicate national team as defined under FIFA eligibility rules; some limited exceptions apply. Players may hold more than one non-FIFA nationality.

No.	Pos.	Nation	Player
1	GK	BIH	Vladan Kovačević
3	DF	ENG	Jack Stacey
6	DF	ENG	Harry Darling
7	MF	DEN	Pelle Mattsson (vice-captain)
11	MF	JAM	Andre Brooks
12	DF	ENG	Lucien Mahovo
13	DF	CMR	Darlin Yongwa
14	DF	ENG	Ben Chrisene
15	DF	NIR	Ruairi McConville
16	MF	ENG	Jacob Wright
17	FW	CRO	Ante Crnac
19	MF	SEN	Papa Amadou Diallo
20	MF	TUN	Anis Ben Slimane
21	FW	AUS	Mohamed Touré
22	MF	SRB	Mirko Topić
23	MF	SCO	Kenny McLean (captain)

No.	Pos.	Nation	Player
24	FW	ENG	Jovon Makama
25	MF	COD	Paris Maghoma
26	MF	ENG	Sam Field (3rd captain)
28	DF	BRA	Bruno Alves (on loan from Cruzeiro)
29	MF	DEN	Oscar Schwartau
30	FW	DEN	Mathias Kvistgaarden
32	GK	ENG	Daniel Grimshaw
33	DF	PAN	José Córdoba
34	GK	CHI	Vicente Reyes
35	DF	ENG	Kellen Fisher
37	MF	CAN	Ali Ahmed
40	GK	ENG	Caleb Ansen
41	MF	SCO	Gabriel Forsyth
44	MF	WAL	Elliot Myles
46	FW	ENG	Errol Mundle-Smith
49	FW	COD	Anthony Musaba (on loan from Fenerbahçe)

=== Out on loan ===
Note: Flags indicate national team as defined under FIFA eligibility rules; some limited exceptions apply. Players may hold more than one non-FIFA nationality.

No.	Pos.	Nation	Player
5	DF	CRO	Jakov Medić (at FC Utrecht until 30 June 2027)
8	MF	ENG	Liam Gibbs (at Preston North End until 30 June 2027)
10	MF	CZE	Matěj Jurásek (at Sparta Prague until 30 June 2027)

No.	Pos.	Nation	Player
18	MF	GHA	Amankwah Forson (at Hapoel Be'er Sheva until 30 June 2027)
31	GK	ENG	Louie Moulden (at Accrington Stanley until 30 June 2027)

=== Development squad ===
This team is made up of under-21 and academy players and is limited to three outfield players and one goalkeeper over the age of 21 per game.

In March 2018, the public mini-bond investment scheme mentioned above raised £5 million. With this investment, the club installed new pitches at its Category 1 Academy, as well as a new irrigation system, cameras for analysis and floodlights, a new main building, with a gym, classrooms, physios room, changing rooms and offices. A stand was also installed next to the main Academy pitch.

=== Notable players ===
Past (and present) players who are the subjects of Wikipedia articles can be found here

During the club's centenary season, a "Hall of Fame" was created, honouring 100 former players chosen by fan vote. Further players have since been inducted into the Norwich City Hall of Fame.

=== Greatest Ever Norwich City XI (1902–2008) ===
In 2008, supporters cast votes to determine the greatest ever Norwich City team.

- Kevin Keelan (1963–1980)
- Ian Culverhouse (1985–1994)
- Steve Bruce (1984–1987)
- Duncan Forbes (1968–1981)
- Mark Bowen (1987–1996)
- Darren Huckerby (2003–2008)
- Ian Crook (1986–1997)
- Martin Peters (1975–1980)
- Darren Eadie (1993–1999)
- Chris Sutton (1991–1994)
- Iwan Roberts (1997–2004)

=== Players of the Season ===
Every year, fans vote for whom they believe to have been the player of the season.

Season	Winner
1966–67	Terry Allcock
1967–68	Hugh Curran
1968–69	Ken Foggo
1969–70	Duncan Forbes
1970–71	Ken Foggo
1971–72	Dave Stringer
1972–73	Kevin Keelan
1973–74	Kevin Keelan
1974–75	Colin Suggett
1975–76	Martin Peters
1976–77	Martin Peters
1977–78	John Ryan

Season	Winner
1978–79	Tony Powell
1979–80	Kevin Bond
1980–81	Joe Royle
1981–82	Greg Downs
1982–83	Dave Watson
1983–84	Chris Woods
1984–85	Steve Bruce
1985–86	Kevin Drinkell
1986–87	Kevin Drinkell
1987–88	Bryan Gunn
1988–89	Dale Gordon
1989–90	Mark Bowen

Season	Winner
1990–91	Ian Culverhouse
1991–92	Robert Fleck
1992–93	Bryan Gunn
1993–94	Chris Sutton
1994–95	Jon Newsome
1995–96	Spencer Prior
1996–97	Darren Eadie
1997–98	Matt Jackson
1998–99	Iwan Roberts
1999–2000	Iwan Roberts
2000–01	Andy Marshall
2001–02	Gary Holt

Season	Winner
2002–03	Adam Drury
2003–04	Craig Fleming
2004–05	Darren Huckerby
2005–06	Gary Doherty
2006–07	Darren Huckerby
2007–08	Dion Dublin
2008–09	Lee Croft
2009–10	Grant Holt
2010–11	Grant Holt
2011–12	Grant Holt
2012–13	Sébastien Bassong
2013–14	Robert Snodgrass

Season	Winner
2014–15	Bradley Johnson
2015–16	Jonny Howson
2016–17	Wes Hoolahan
2017–18	James Maddison
2018–19	Teemu Pukki
2019–20	Tim Krul
2020–21	Emiliano Buendía
2021–22	Teemu Pukki
2022–23	Gabriel Sara
2023–24	Kenny McLean
2024–25	Josh Sargent
2025–26	Kenny McLean

== Club staff ==
=== Backroom staff ===
Position	Name
Head coach	(Belgium) Philippe Clement
Assistant Head Coach	(Belgium) Stephan Van Der Heyden
First Team Coach	(England) Ryan Garry
Set Piece Coach	(England) Nick Stanley
Goalkeeper coach	(England) Declan Rudd
Head of Football Development	(England) Dean Rastrick

=== Board of directors ===
Position	Name
Majority Shareholder	(United States) Mark Attanasio
Honorary Life Presidents	(England) Delia Smith
Honorary Life Presidents	(Wales) Michael Wynn-Jones
Directors	(United States) Richard Ressler
Directors	(England) Thomas Smith
Executive Director	(England) Zoe Webber
Sporting Director	(England) Ben Knapper
Assistant Sporting Director	(England) Lee Dunn
Head of Operations & Projects	(England) Greg Pillinger
Finance Director	(England) Anthony Richens
Commercial Director	(England) Sam Jeffrey
Legal and Governance Director	(England) James Hill

== Managers ==
As of 21 November 2026. Not including caretaker managers. Only professional, competitive matches are counted.

Name	Nationality	From	To	G	W	D	L	%W
John Bowman	England	1 August 1905	31 July 1907	78	31	23	24	39.7
James McEwen	England	1 August 1907	31 May 1908	43	13	10	20	30.2
Arthur Turner	England	1 August 1909	31 May 1910	86	27	22	37	31.4
Bert Stansfield	England	1 August 1910	31 May 1915	248	78	75	95	31.5
Frank Buckley	England	1 August 1919	1 July 1920	43	15	11	17	34.9
Charles O'Hagan	Ireland	1 July 1920	1 January 1921	21	4	9	8	19.0
Bert Gosnell	England	1 January 1921	28 February 1926	233	59	79	95	25.3
Bert Stansfield	England	1 March 1926	1 November 1926					
Cecil Potter	England	1 November 1926	1 January 1929	101	30	26	45	29.7
James Kerr	England	1 April 1929	28 February 1933	168	65	43	60	38.7
Tom Parker	England	1 March 1933; 1 May 1955	1 February 1937; 31 March 1957	271	104	69	98	38.4
Bob Young	England	1 February 1937; 1 September 1939	31 December 1938; 31 May 1946	78	26	14	38	33.3
Jimmy Jewell	England	1 January 1939	1 September 1939	20	6	4	10	30.0
Duggie Lochhead	Scotland	1 December 1945	1 March 1950	104	42	28	34	40.4
Cyril Spiers	England	1 June 1946	1 December 1947	65	15	12	38	23.1
Norman Low	Scotland	1 May 1950	30 April 1955	258	129	56	73	50.0
Archie Macaulay	Scotland	1 April 1957	1 October 1961	224	105	60	59	46.9
Willie Reid	Scotland	1 December 1961	1 May 1962	31	13	6	12	41.9
George Swindin	England	1 May 1962	30 November 1962	20	10	5	5	50.0
Ron Ashman	England	1 December 1962	31 May 1966	162	59	39	64	36.4
Lol Morgan	England	1 June 1966	1 May 1969	127	45	47	35	35.4
Ron Saunders	England	1 July 1969	16 November 1973	221	84	61	76	38.0
John Bond	England	27 November 1973	31 October 1980	340	105	114	121	30.9
Ken Brown	England	1 November 1980	9 November 1987	367	150	93	124	40.9
Dave Stringer	England	9 November 1987	1 May 1992	229	89	58	82	38.9
Mike Walker	Wales	1 June 1992; 21 June 1996	6 January 1994; 30 April 1998	179	69	46	64	38.5
John Deehan	England	12 January 1994	9 April 1995	58	13	22	23	22.4
Martin O'Neill	Northern Ireland	14 June 1995	17 December 1995	26	12	9	5	46.2
Gary Megson	England	21 December 1995	21 June 1996	32	5	10	17	15.6
Bruce Rioch	Scotland	12 June 1998	13 March 2000	93	30	31	32	32.3
Bryan Hamilton	Northern Ireland	5 April 2000	4 December 2000	35	10	10	15	28.6
Nigel Worthington	Northern Ireland	4 December 2000	2 October 2006	280	114	104	62	40.7
Peter Grant	Scotland	13 October 2006	9 October 2007	54	18	12	24	33.3
Glenn Roeder	England	30 October 2007	14 January 2009	65	20	15	30	30.8
Bryan Gunn	Scotland	16 January 2009	13 August 2009	21	6	5	10	28.6
Paul Lambert	Scotland	18 August 2009	2 June 2012	142	70	37	35	49.3
Chris Hughton	Ireland	6 June 2012	6 April 2014	82	24	23	35	29.3
Neil Adams	England	6 April 2014	5 January 2015	32	11	8	13	34.4
Alex Neil	Scotland	9 January 2015	10 March 2017	108	45	21	42	41.7
Daniel Farke	Germany	25 May 2017	6 November 2021	208	87	49	72	41.8
Dean Smith	England	15 November 2021	27 December 2022	42	12	9	21	28.6
David Wagner	United States	6 January 2023	17 May 2024	76	31	17	28	40.8
Johannes Hoff Thorup	Denmark	30 May 2024	22 April 2025	47	14	14	19	29.8
Liam Manning	England	3 June 2025	8 November 2025	17	3	3	11	17.6
Philippe Clement	Belgium	18 November 2025	Present	53	29	5	19	54.7

== Honours ==
Norwich City have won a number of honours:

League

- Second Division / First Division / Championship (level 2) (Note: Norwich's highest finish in the first tier is third in the 1992–93 Premier League.)
  - Champions (5): 1971–72, 1985–86, 2003–04, 2018–19, 2020–21
  - Runners-up: 2010–11
  - Play-off winners: 2015
- Third Division South / League One (level 3)
  - Champions: 1933–34, 2009–10
  - Runners-up: 1959–60

Cup

- Football League Cup (Note: Norwich's best performances in the FA Cup have been appearances in the semi-finals in the 1958–59, 1988–89 and 1991–92 seasons.)
  - Winners: 1961–62, 1984–85
  - Runners-up: 1972–73, 1974–75

=== Friendship Trophy ===
Each time they meet, Norwich and Sunderland contest the Friendship Trophy, a game dating back to the camaraderie forged between fans of the two clubs at the time of the 1985 League Cup final that they contested. Sunderland are the current champions as of 21 December 2024 having won 2-1 at the Stadium of Light.

== In popular culture ==
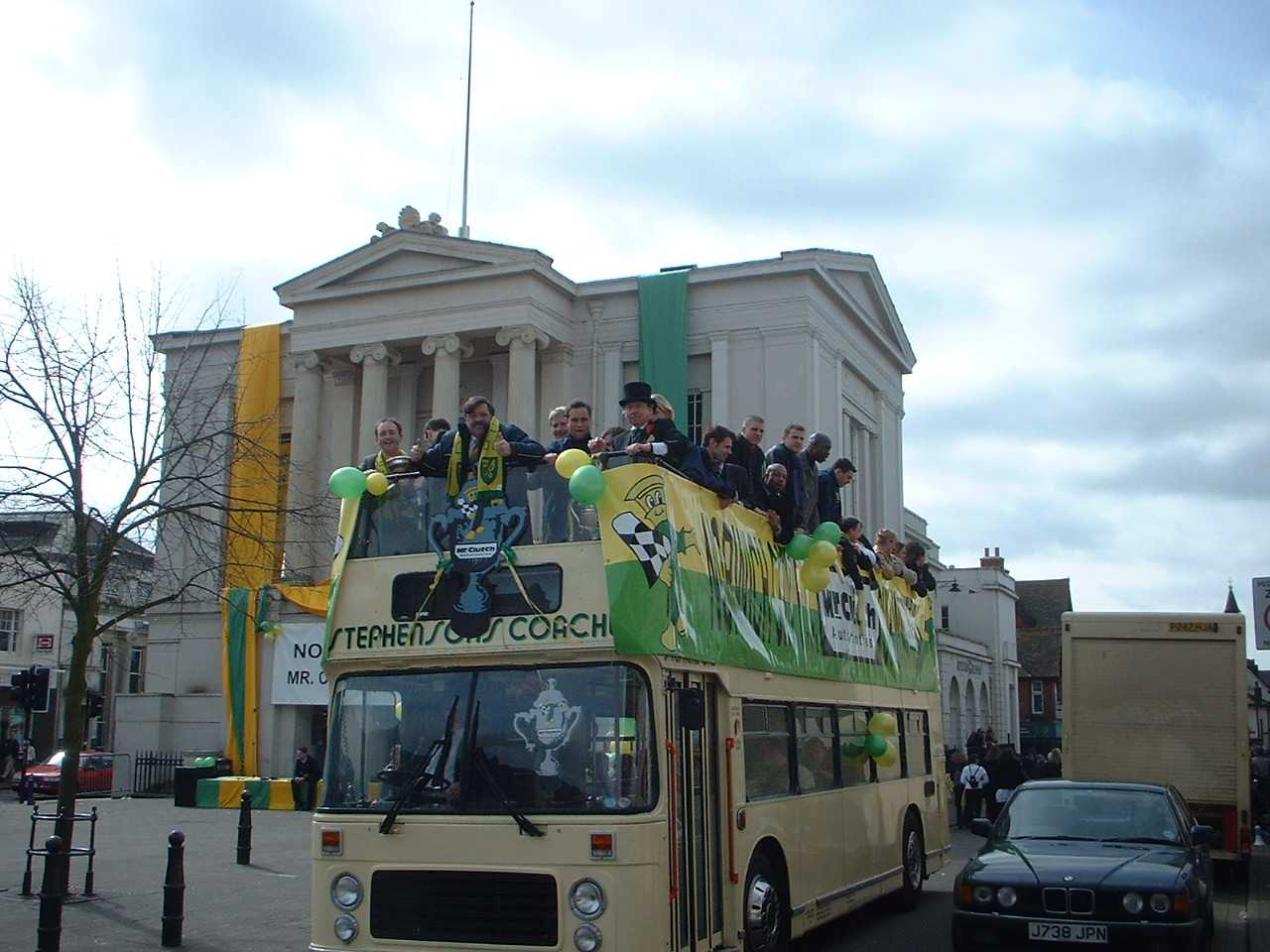
Making of Mike Bassett: England Manager

In 1972 the Children's Film Foundation released a movie called The Boy Who Turned Yellow about a boy living in London who supports Norwich City. In the film, he and everyone and everything else on his tube train are turned yellow. That night he is visited by a yellow alien called Nick, short for electronic, who teaches him all about electricity. The link to the football club is used to explain why the boy already has so many yellow things in his bedroom.

In the 2001 film Mike Bassett: England Manager, the eponymous hero, played by Ricky Tomlinson, rises to prominence as a result of success as manager of Norwich City, having won the 'Mr Clutch Cup'. The celebratory scenes of the open-top bus ride around the city were actually shot in St Albans, Hertfordshire, rather than Norwich.

On 10 October 2023, Norwich City released an advertisement raising awareness of suicide prevention for World Mental Health Day. The advertisement received widespread acclaim with UEFA labelling it 'incredibly powerful'. The advertisement was viewed 'tens of millions of times' and saw over 7,500 messages be sent to suicide prevention charity Samaritans within the first week of its release. For its success, the advertisement won Marketing Week's 2024 Marketing Award for Sport, Gaming and Entertainment.

== Norwich City Women ==
Norwich City Women is the women's football club affiliated to Norwich City. Since 2022, the general manager is Flo Allen, and they currently compete in Division One South East, in the fourth tier of English women's football. Norwich City Women play their home games at The Nest, a 22 acres (8.9 ha) site at Horsford.
