= Matt Crowe =

Scottish footballer

- Crowe while with Norwich City in 1959.

Personal information
- Full name: Matthew Jackson Crowe
- Date of birth: 4 July 1932
- Place of birth: Bathgate, Scotland
- Date of death: June 2017 (aged 84)
- Place of death: Port Elizabeth, South Africa
- Position: Wing half

Youth career
- 1948–1949: Bathgate Thistle

Senior career*
Years	Team	Apps	(Gls)
1948–1954	Bradford Park Avenue	1	(0)
1954–1957	Partick Thistle	28	(11)
1957–1962	Norwich City	186	(14)
1962–1964	Brentford	73	(0)
1964–1966	Port Elizabeth City	59	(2)
1966	Westview Apollon	8	(0)
Total		296	(25)
- * Club domestic league appearances and goals

Matthew Jackson Crowe (4 July 1932 – June 2017) was a Scottish professional footballer who played as a wing half. Active throughout Scotland, England and South Africa, Crowe made nearly 300 career appearances.

== Career ==
Born in Bathgate, Crowe played for Bathgate Thistle, Bradford Park Avenue, Partick Thistle, Norwich City, Brentford and Port Elizabeth City.

== Honours ==
Brentford

- Football League Fourth Division: 1962–63

Individual

- Norwich City Hall of Fame
