= Bobby Brennan =

Northern Irish footballer (1925–2002)

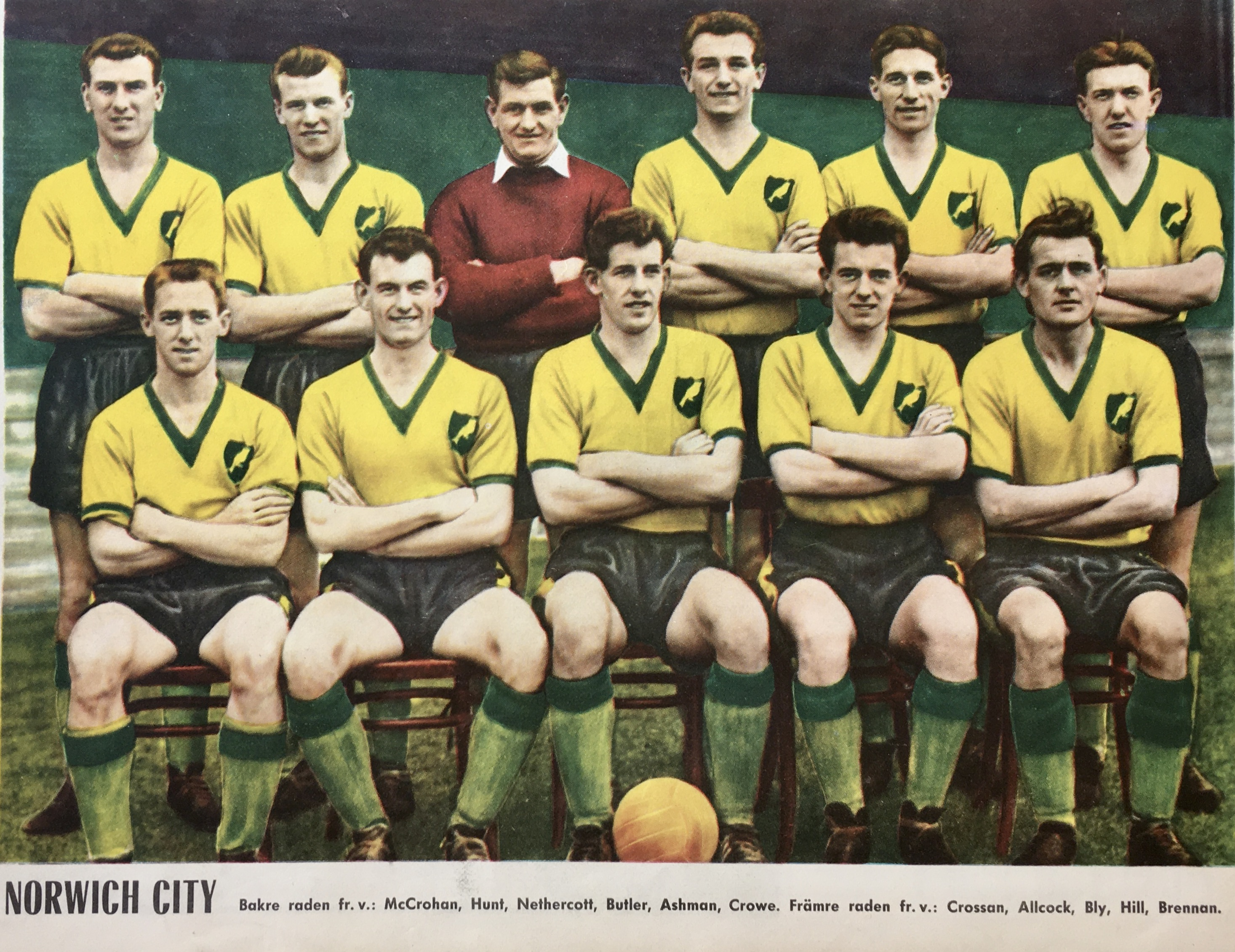
- Norwich City F.C. in 1959: Brennan seated on right

Personal information
- Full name: Robert Anderson Brennan
- Date of birth: 14 March 1925
- Place of birth: Belfast, Northern Ireland
- Date of death: 1 January 2002 (aged 76)
- Place of death: Norwich, England
- Height: 5 ft 8 1/2 in (1.74 m)
- Positions: Inside left; winger

Senior career*
Years	Team	Apps	(Gls)
- Harland and Wolff Welders
1943	Bloomfield United		
1943–1947	Distillery		
1947–1949	Luton Town	69	(22)
1949–1950	Birmingham City	39	(7)
1950–1953	Fulham	73	(13)
1953–1956	Norwich City	117	(30)
1956–1957	Great Yarmouth Town		
1957–1960	Norwich City	108	(14)
1960–1961	King's Lynn		

International career
1949–1950	Northern Ireland	5	(1)
- * Club domestic league appearances and goals

Robert Anderson Brennan (14 March 1925 – 1 January 2002) was a professional footballer who made more than 400 appearances in the Football League, which included 225 matches for Norwich City, and was capped five times for Northern Ireland. He played as an inside left or winger.

== Life and career ==
Born in Belfast, Brennan began his career in his home country of Northern Ireland, firstly with Harland and Wolff Welders and then Bloomfield United and Distillery. He moved to England in 1947 to join Luton Town. He subsequently moved to Birmingham City in 1949 and Fulham in 1950.

Brennan's first spell with Norwich City lasted from 1953 to 1956. He left the club to play for Great Yarmouth Town before returning to Norwich in 1957. In the 1958–59 season, Brennan was a member of the Norwich team that reached the semi-finals of the FA Cup as a Third Division side. It was one of the most famous FA Cup runs in the history of the competition, as the club beat First Division teams Manchester United and Tottenham Hotspur along the way. In the semi-final against his former club Luton, Brennan scored Norwich's equaliser in the first match at White Hart Lane before the team lost the replay at St Andrew's, Birmingham.

Brennan left Norwich for the second time in 1961 to join King's Lynn.

In 2002, Brennan was made an inaugural member of the Norwich City F.C. Hall of Fame.

He died in Norwich in 2002.

== Sources ==
- Mark Davage; John Eastwood; Kevin Platt (2001). Canary Citizens. Jarrold Publishing. ISBN 0-7117-2020-7.
