= List of Norwich City F.C. managers =

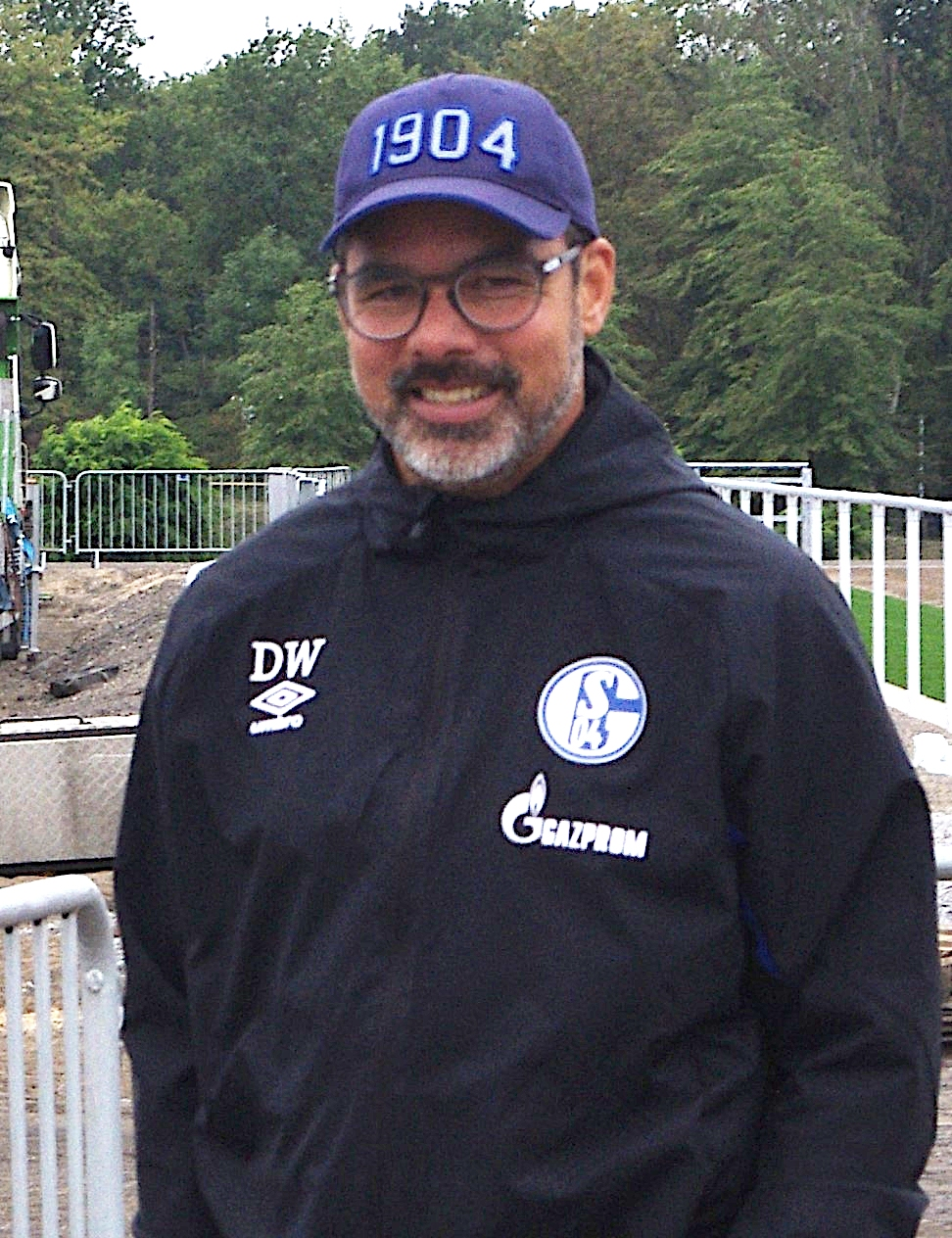
David Wagner, head coach of Norwich City from January 2023 to May 2024

Norwich City Football Club is an association football club based in Norwich, Norfolk, and was founded in 1902. The club's first manager, John Bowman, was appointed in 1905. Since then, 43 men have held the job on a permanent basis. (Note: Bert Stansfield, Tom Parker, Bob Young, Mike Walker and Gary Megson counted once each.) Since 18 November 2025, the position has been held by Philippe Clement.

Ken Brown holds the record for most games in charge, with a total of 367 between 1980 and 1987. Excluding caretaker managers, the shortest reigns were those of George Swindin and Jimmy Jewell, who both managed 20 games; Jewell's tenure was ended by the outbreak of the Second World War. Fifteen managers have been named in the Norwich City F.C. Hall of Fame, some of whom were also former players.

The last Norwich manager to win a major trophy was Ken Brown, who won the League Cup with Norwich in 1985. Norwich have never won the FA Cup, but have reached the FA Cup semi-finals three times – most recently in the 1989 and 1992 competitions, but also the 1958–59 FA Cup, when Archie Macaulay managed the then third-tier club to several giant-killing victories before losing a semi-final replay to Luton Town. Norwich reached the top tier of English football for the first time in 1972, under the leadership of Ron Saunders. The highest league finish Norwich have ever achieved was third in the 1992–93 season, under Mike Walker. The following season, he managed Norwich in their only European campaign to date in the UEFA Cup, when they became the only British club to ever defeat Bayern Munich at their home ground, the Olympic Stadium.

== History ==
=== Early years ===
Norwich City was founded as an amateur football club in 1902. During the early years of the club's history, there was no manager. Arthur Turner, was the joint secretary of the club, and his wide-ranging role included that of "match secretary": according to John Eastwood, author of Canary Citizens: The Official History Of Norwich City F.C., this meant he would "look after the playing side". Following an FA Commission of inquiry, the club was informed on the last day of 1904 that they had been deemed a professional organisation and hence ineligible to compete in amateur football. The FA announced various shortcomings in the club's practices, many of which involved Turner specifically, including:

fees ... paid for the use of a gymnasium and also for the training and massage of players. The sum of £8 was also paid to a player when he left the club. Payments were made to players without a receipt being taken. The club advertised for players ... [the] secretary ... spent considerable sums of money in travelling to other towns in East Anglia ... travelling expenses were ... excessive.

The club officials, including Turner, had to be removed from office and Norwich were ousted from the amateur game at the end of the season. The response was swift: at a meeting two days later, it was resolved to find a place in professional football. On 30 May 1905, they were elected to play in the Southern League, in place of Wellingborough. By then the club had secured their first professional manager, John Bowman. Bowman served two years in the role. He also has a place in Norwich City history for making the first recorded link between the team and its nickname "Canaries", although at this time the club nickname was "Citizens". The earliest recorded link between the club and canaries, came in a 1905 newspaper interview with Bowman, quoting him saying: "Well I knew of the City's existence ... I have ... heard of the canaries." At the time, this was a reference to Norwich's link to breeding canaries; the club's canary colours and crest would follow the adoption of the nickname.

The Norwich City player James McEwen was appointed as manager in 1907. Tom Parker was the first Norwich manager to achieve promotion, as the club won the Division Three (South) title in the 1933–34 season, before being relegated in the 1938–39 season by the slimmest of margins – a goal average of 0.05. Norman Low came close to regaining Second Division status in several seasons of the 1950s, but the return of Tom Parker led to ignominy of finishing bottom of the Football League in the 1956–57 season. The poor performance on the field was overshadowed by financial difficulties; the club was rescued from liquidation and reformed, with Archie Macaulay appointed as manager.

=== Rise to the top division ===
Macaulay oversaw one of Norwich City's greatest achievements: its run to the semi-final of the 1958–59 FA Cup. Competing as a Third Division side, Norwich defeated two First Division opponents along the way, notably a 3–0 win against the Manchester United "Busby Babes". City lost the semi-final only after a replay against another First Division side, Luton Town. The "59 Cup Run" as it is now known locally, "remains as one of the truly great periods in Norwich City's history" according to the club. Norwich were the third-ever Third Division team to reach the FA Cup semi-final.

Macaulay then extended success to the league. In the 1959–60 season, Norwich were promoted to the Second Division after finishing behind league champions Southampton, and achieved a fourth-place finish in the 1960–61 season. From 1960, Norwich spent the next 12 seasons in the second tier, with finishes of fourth in 1961 and sixth in the 1964–65 season being among the most notable.

In 1962, Willie Reid guided Norwich to their first trophy, defeating Rochdale 4–0 on aggregate in a two-legged final to win the League Cup. Norwich finally achieved promotion from Division Two when they finished as champions in the 1971–72 season under Ron Saunders; Norwich City had reached the highest level of English football for the first time.

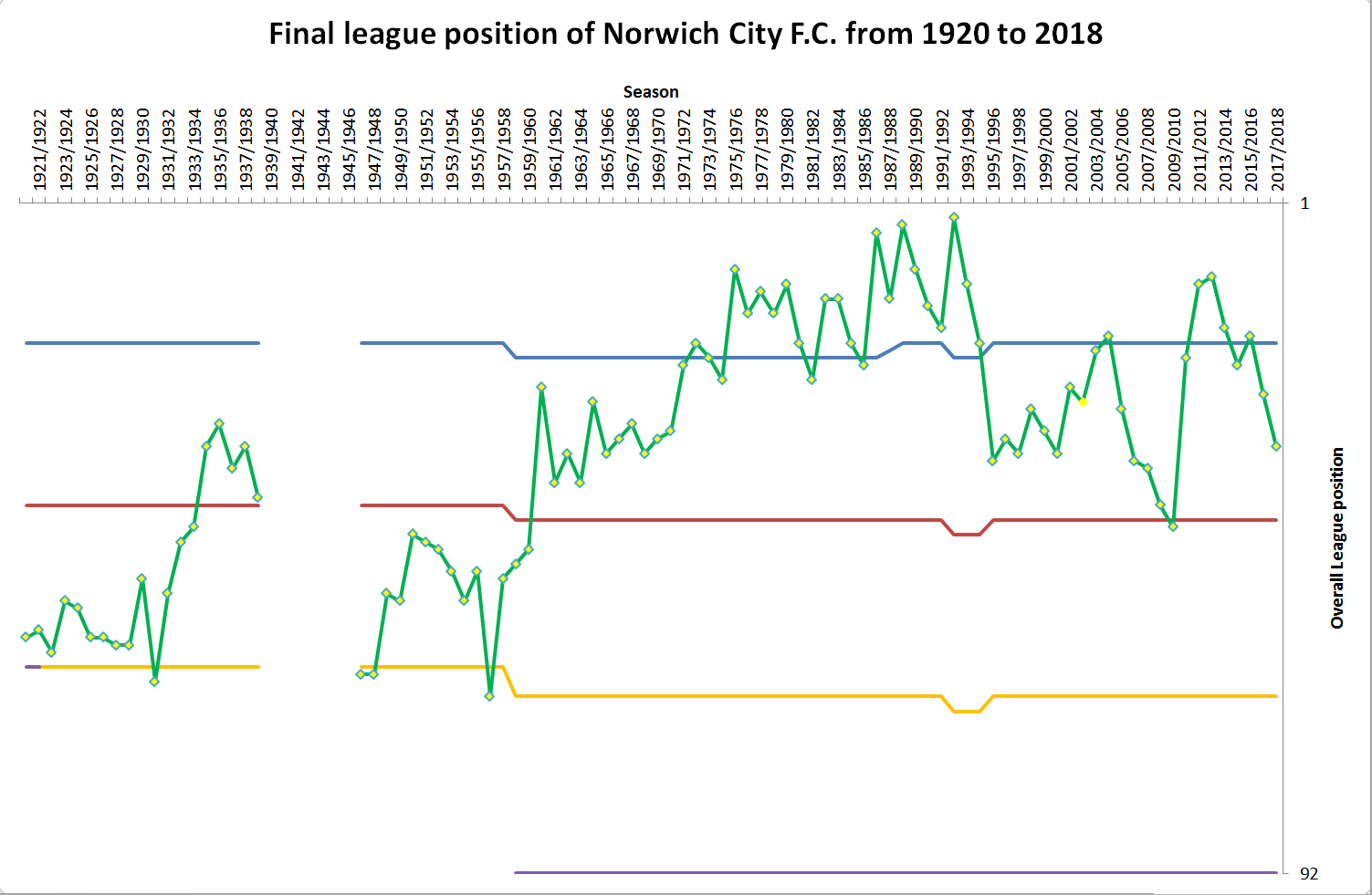
Norwich City's league positions, 1920–2018, showing "yo-yo"ing

Saunders capitalised on this success, taking Norwich to their first appearance at Wembley Stadium in 1973, losing the League Cup final 1–0 to Tottenham Hotspur. However, following a boardroom row after a 3–1 home defeat to Everton on 17 November 1973, Saunders resigned as manager on the spot. The new manager was John Bond who oversaw the club's relegation that season. A highly successful first season saw promotion back to the First Division and another visit to Wembley, again in the League Cup final, this time losing 1–0 to Aston Villa. Bond managed to keep Norwich in the top-tier of English football for another six seasons. The club finished tenth in the 1975–76 season; at the time their highest ever finish. Under Bond though, the club never managed to qualify for European competitions. He resigned during the 1980–81 season and the club was relegated, but returned to the top tier the following season after finishing third under new manager Ken Brown.

The 1984–85 season was one of mixed fortunes for the club; a fire gutted the old Main Stand on 25 October 1984, but on the pitch, under Brown's management, they reached the final of the League Cup (known at that time as the Milk Cup) at Wembley, having defeated local rivals Ipswich Town in the semi-final. In the final, they beat Sunderland 1–0, but in the league both Norwich and Sunderland were relegated to the second tier of English football. By winning a major trophy, Brown's side qualified for the UEFA Cup, but were denied their first foray into European competition when English club sides were banned, following the Heysel Stadium disaster. City made an immediate return to the top flight by winning the Second Division championship in the 1985–86 season. Brown's success continued into the 1986–87 season, when Norwich finished fifth, but following the departure of his assistant, Mel Machin, the club made a weak start to the following season and Brown was dismissed in November 1987. Dave Stringer, who had made nearly 500 appearances for City as a player, was appointed manager. He kept Norwich in the top tier and the following season the club finished fourth, which, like the 1986–87 season, would have been enough for 1989–90 UEFA Cup qualification, but the ban on English clubs was still in place. Stringer also managed to guide City to the semi-finals of the 1988–89 FA Cup and repeated the feat in the 1991–92 tournament. However, the 1991–92 season saw Norwich flirt with relegation and finished 18th, leading to Stringer's resignation.

=== Premier League, Europe and club centenary ===
The club's reserve team coach Mike Walker was Stringer's permanent successor. He was promoted to take charge of the first team before the 1992–93 inaugural season of the English Premier League. (Note: When the Premier League started in 1992, the second tier changed its name from the Second Division to the First Division. It was renamed again as the Championship in 2004.) Media and pundits tipped Norwich for a season of struggle, but the club led the league for much of the season, and eventually finished third. It was the club's highest ever finish and Norwich qualified for European football.

Walker's team played in the 1993–94 UEFA Cup, defeating Dutch club Vitesse Arnhem 3–0 in the first round. In the second round, they faced Bayern Munich. Norwich won the tie 3–2 on aggregate; their 2–1 victory in Munich earning Norwich a place in history, as the only English team to beat Bayern Munich in the Olympic Stadium. The win in Munich was described in The Independent as "the pinnacle of Norwich City's history". Reflecting on the result, FourFourTwo wrote "The news that Norwich had gone 2–0 up in the Olympic Stadium seemed frankly surreal." Norwich's cup run was ended by Inter Milan, who defeated them 2–0 over two legs. Walker's success at Norwich attracted attention and, in January 1994, he left the club to take charge of Everton. Walker had commented to the press earlier in his time at Norwich that "to earn a decent salary" from chairman Robert Chase, he'd have to "win the League, FA Cup and Eurovision Song Contest every year."

Walker's replacement was the first team coach John Deehan, assisted by Gary Megson, then still a player. Deehan led the club to 12th place in the 1993–94 season in the Premier League. During the 1994 close season, the club sold the 21-year-old striker Chris Sutton to Blackburn Rovers for a then British record fee of £5 million. By Christmas of the 1994–95 season, Norwich City were seventh in the Premiership and challenging for a return to the UEFA Cup, but, following a serious injury to goalkeeper Bryan Gunn, the club's performance dipped; with just one win in their final twenty Premiership fixtures, Norwich dropped to 20th place and were relegated to the second tier of English football. Deehan resigned just before relegation was confirmed; he was replaced in the summer of 1995 by former Norwich player Martin O'Neill, who had taken Wycombe Wanderers from the Conference to the Second Division with successive promotions.

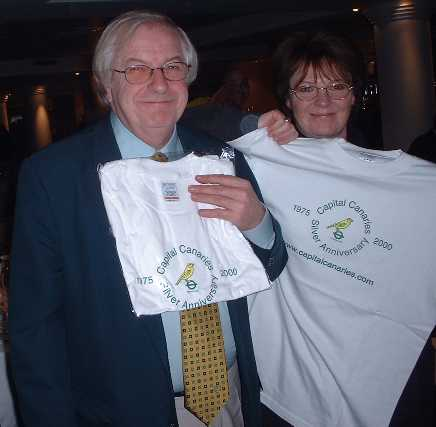
Michael Wynn-Jones and Delia Smith at a fans' event

O'Neill's tenure lasted just six months; he resigned after a dispute with chairman Robert Chase over Chase's refusal to permit O'Neill to spend significant sums on strengthening the squad. According to O'Neill, the tipping point was the refusal of Chase to permit the purchase of Dean Windass. Soon after O'Neill's resignation, Chase stepped down after protests from supporters, who complained that he kept selling the club's best players, refused to reinvest in new players and consequently was to blame for relegation.

Gary Megson was appointed Norwich manager on a temporary basis for the second time in eight months: he had also briefly filled this role after Deehan's departure. Megson remained in charge until the end of the 1995–96 season before leaving the club. Mike Walker, who had struggled at Everton, was re-appointed as the club's manager. He was unable to repeat the success achieved during his first spell and was sacked in the 1997–98 season with Norwich mid-table in the First Division.

Walker's successor Bruce Rioch lasted two seasons and departed in the summer of 2000. While Rioch failed to gain promotion, his time at Norwich did leave a lasting impact in his man-management of Iwan Roberts, who had been struggling to perform. Roberts himself has ascribed his difficulties to being overweight; the turnaround was, according to Roberts, due to some clever psychology by Rioch. Roberts scored 23 goals in the 1998–99 season, and is now in the club's Hall of Fame.

Rioch's successor, Bryan Hamilton, had been appointed as director of football when Rioch took on the manager role; he lasted in the manager's job for six months before he resigned with the club 20th in the First Division, and in real danger of relegation to the third tier of English football for the first time since the 1960s. The new appointee was Nigel Worthington, who had been Hamilton's assistant manager. Worthington's time as Norwich manager was one of peaks and troughs, with mid-table comfort a rarity. In his first part-season, he successfully steered the team away from the threat of relegation. The following season, Norwich exceeded expectations and reached the play-off final, losing to Birmingham City on penalties.

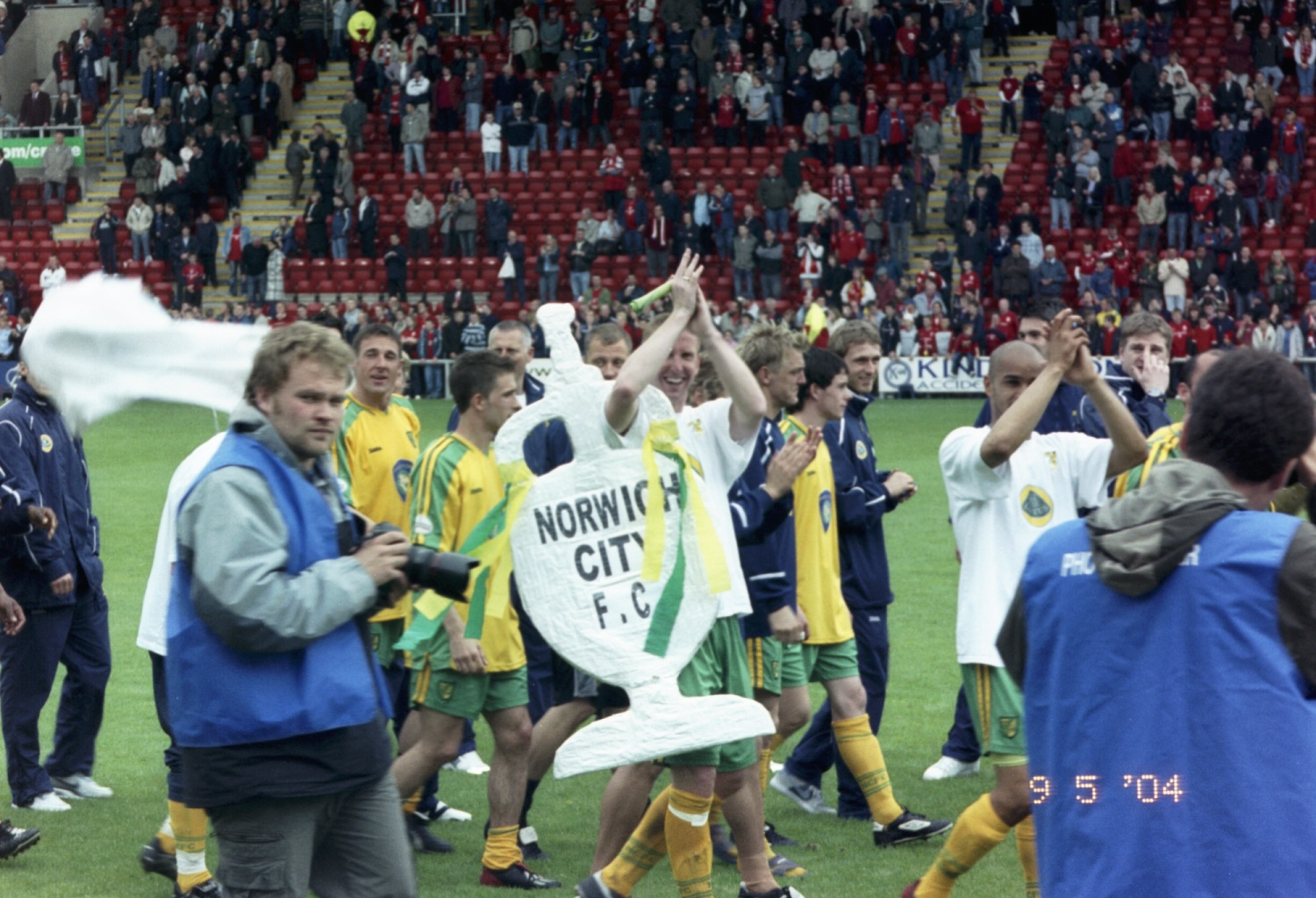
City players celebrate winning the First Division Championship, 2004

After a season of consolidation, Worthington led the club to the First Division title in the 2003–04 season, a success achieved by a margin of eight points and Norwich returned to the top flight for the first time in nine years. For much of the 2004–05 season, the club struggled in the Premiership, but the team staged a comeback in the final weeks of the season. Norwich, who had not won in months, suddenly went on a run, securing 13 points out of 18. With the bottom three sides to be automatically relegated, on the last day of the season, the club were fourth from bottom and a win would have kept them in top flight football, but a 6–0 away defeat to Fulham condemned them to relegation.

The club was expected to make a quick return to the Premiership in the 2005–06 season, but poor performances began to turn the fans against Worthington. Dean Ashton was sold for a club-record £7 m, approximately a 100% profit on the fee they had paid just one year earlier. Half of Ashton's fee was immediately reinvested in the purchase of Welsh striker Robert Earnshaw, who helped the Canaries' revival to a ninth-place finish. Worthington made just one permanent signing prior to the 2006–07 season, and when a poor run of form ensued, leaving the club in 17th place in the Championship, he was dismissed. Former City player Peter Grant left West Ham to become the new manager.

Grant brought in fellow Scot, Jim Duffy, as his assistant, and managed to lift the side to finish 16th in the league. During the 2007 close season, Grant brought in nine players; however ten players, including Earnshaw, departed. Darren Huckerby remained but caused controversy by criticising the club for selling their best players and berating his fellow players. When the 2007–08 season opened with only two Norwich wins by 9 October 2007, Grant left the club by "mutual consent". At the end of October, former Newcastle United boss Glenn Roeder was confirmed as the new manager. Roeder released a number of players, largely replacing them with inexperienced loan signings. Results improved significantly, lifting the club from five points adrift at the foot of the table to a comfortable mid-table position.

Following a poor first half of the 2008–09 campaign, it was announced in January 2009 that Roeder had been relieved of his first team duties. The appointment of Bryan Gunn as temporary manager did not prevent relegation to the third tier of English league football (League One), a level the club had not played at since 1960, at the end of the 2008–09 Championship season.

Norwich started their League One campaign on 8 August 2009 at home to fellow East Anglians Colchester United. They were widely expected to return swiftly to the Championship, however they suffered a 1–7 defeat. This was their worst home defeat in their 107-year history. Gunn was sacked six days later, and the club moved swiftly to appoint the man who had contributed to his downfall: Colchester manager Paul Lambert. He led Norwich to the League 1 title and promotion to the Championship in April 2010. He oversaw a turnaround in fortunes to lead Norwich to promotion back to The Championship as League One champions, during the 2009–10 season that included a 16-league-game unbeaten run that included just two draws. The 2010–11 season saw Norwich promoted to the Premier League, the first time the club had been promoted two years running. After a successful 2011–12 season, finishing twelfth, Lambert resigned as Norwich manager in June 2012, moving to Aston Villa.

Lambert was replaced by Birmingham City's manager Chris Hughton. With Norwich one place above the relegation zone and five matches remaining in the 2013–14 season, Hughton was sacked, and replaced by youth coach and former Norwich player Neil Adams. However, they could not avoid the drop to the Championship. Under Adams, Norwich began the 2014–15 season in the Championship with good form and were second in the table in September, but performances became mixed, the club slid to seventh place and a 2–0 defeat in the 2014–15 FA Cup by Preston North End F.C. (then in League One) led to Adams' resignation. He was replaced by Hamilton Academical coach Alex Neil. A revitalised and disciplined Canaries side achieved 17 victories in the remaining 25 games, qualifying for the end of season Football League playoffs. Neil's side secured victory over local rivals Ipswich Town, before defeating Middlesbrough in the final at Wembley Stadium, to return to the Premier League.

Norwich's spell in the top flight lasted just one season, and Neil's side were expected to be contenders for the Championship title in the 2016–17 season. The side were second in the table early in the season, but a dip in form saw the Board sack Neil in March 2017, placing Alan Irvine in temporary charge. On 25 May 2017, the German Borussia Dortmund reserve team coach Daniel Farke replaced Irvine as manager of the club on a two-year contract, becoming the first non-British manager of Norwich City. In Farke's first season, Norwich finished in 14th place. The following season was far more successful; helped by top scorer Teemu Pukki, the club was promoted back to the Premier League after a three-year absence as Championship winners. However, Norwich were once again relegated back to the Championship after just a single season back in the top flight, becoming the first team in Premier League history to be relegated five times from the division. The yo-yo effect continued unabated: in May 2021, Norwich were crowned winners of the Championship, securing promotion back to the top flight at the first time of asking, but they failed to win a match in their first nine games back in the Premier League in the 2021–22 season, and Farke was dismissed by the club in November. On 14 November 2021, the club appointed former Walsall, Brentford and Aston Villa manager Dean Smith as their new head coach. Norwich completed a record sixth relegation from the Premier League, and, after an indifferent first half of the following season, Smith was dismissed in December 2022.

On 6 January 2023, the club appointed former Huddersfield Town, Schalke and Young Boys manager David Wagner as their new head coach. Wagner was fired by Norwich on 17 May 2024 after the conclusion of the 2023‍–‍24 season. Norwich finished sixth in the league but lost 4-0 on aggregate in the play-offs to Leeds United.

On 30 May 2024, Norwich appointed Johannes Hoff Thorup as their new manager on a three year contract. Thorup had previously managed FC Nordsjaelland. After fourteen wins in 47 first-team fixtures, Thorup was sacked on 22 April 2025. First-team coach Jack Wilshere was named as temporary head coach.

On 3 June 2025, Norwich appointed Liam Manning who had guided Bristol City F.C. to the play-offs in the previous season. Manning was a Norfolk native and had played for the club as an academy youngster. The club suffered their worst ever run of results at home, losing seven consecutive games in the league, culminating in Manning getting sacked on 8 November 2025. Manning had a win ratio of 17.6%.

On 18 November 2025, Norwich appointed former Club Brugge and Rangers manager Philippe Clement as their new head coach on a contract until 2029.

== Managers ==
Norwich City celebrated its centenary in 2002, in the course of which a Hall of Fame was created. The Norwich City Hall of Fame honours people who have "made the greatest contribution to the club"; As of March 2017, 128 individuals from the club's history have been honoured, including a number of managers listed below.

As of match played 28 April 2021. Only professional, competitive matches are counted.

Key

M	Matches managed
W	Matches won
D	Matches drawn
L	Matches lost
Win %	Percentage of matches won
*	Hall of Fame inductee

Name	Nationality	From	To	M	W	D	L	Win %	Honours	Ref(s)
John Bowman	England	30 May 1905	20 June 1907	78	31	23	24	39.7	–	–
James McEwen	Scotland	1 July 1907	31 September 1908	43	13	10	20	30.2	–	–
Arthur Turner	England	1 March 1909	31 March 1910	86	27	22	37	31.4	–	–
Bert Stansfield	England	1 August 1910; 1 March 1926	31 May 1915; 19 November 1926	248	78	75	95	31.5	–	–
Frank Buckley	England	19 March 1919	10 July 1920	43	15	11	17	34.9	–	–
Charles O'Hagan	Ireland	10 July 1920	24 January 1921	21	4	9	8	19.0	–	–
Albert Gosnell	England	24 January 1921	9 February 1926	223	59	79	95	26.5	–	–
Cecil Potter	England	30 November 1926	26 January 1929	101	30	26	45	29.7	–	–
James Kerr	Scotland	4 April 1929	16 February 1933	168	65	43	60	38.7	–	–
Tom Parker *	England	7 March 1933; 2 May 1955	16 February 1937; 21 March 1957	271	104	69	98	38.4	1933–34 Third tier champions	–
Bob Young	England	22 February 1937; 1 September 1939	21 January 1938; 31 December 1945	78	26	14	38	33.3	–	–
Jimmy Jewell	England	21 January 1939	1 September 1939	20	6	4	10	30.0	–	–
Duggie Lochhead *	Scotland	1 December 1945	2 June 1950	104	42	28	34	40.4	–	–
Cyril Spiers	England	2 June 1946	10 December 1947	65	15	12	38	23.1	–	–
Norman Low *	Scotland	10 May 1950	22 April 1955	258	129	56	73	50.0	–	–
Archie Macaulay *	Scotland	15 April 1957	14 October 1961	224	105	60	59	46.9	1959–60 Third tier runners-up	–
Willie Reid	Scotland	14 December 1961	9 May 1962	31	13	6	12	41.9	1961–62 League Cup champions	–
George Swindin	England	23 May 1962	30 October 1962	20	10	5	5	50.0	–	–
Ron Ashman *	England	10 December 1962	23 June 1966	162	59	39	64	36.4	–	–
Lol Morgan	England	23 June 1966	17 April 1969	127	45	47	35	35.4	–	–
Ron Saunders *	England	9 July 1969	17 November 1973	221	84	61	76	38.0	1971–72 Second tier champions 1972–73 League Cup runners-up	–
John Bond *	England	27 November 1973	12 October 1980	340	105	114	121	34.5	1974–75 League Cup runners-up	–
Ken Brown *	England	19 October 1980	9 November 1987	367	150	93	124	40.9	1984–85 League Cup champions 1985–86 Second tier champions	–
Dave Stringer *	England	9 November 1987	1 May 1992	229	89	58	82	38.9	–	–
David Williams (Note: Caretaker manager.) *	Wales	1 May 1992	1 June 1992	1	0	0	1	0.0	–	–
Mike Walker *	Wales	1 June 1992	6 January 1994	80	36	20	24	45.0	–	
John Deehan *	England	12 January 1994	9 April 1995	58	13	22	23	22.4	–	–
Gary Megson *	England	9 April 1995	14 June 1995	5	0	1	4	0.0	–	–
Martin O'Neill *	Northern Ireland	14 June 1995	17 December 1995	26	12	9	5	46.2	–	–
Paul Franklin	England	17 December 1995	20 December 1995	1	0	0	1	0.0	–	–
Gary Megson *	England	21 December 1995	21 June 1996	27	5	9	13	18.5	–	–
Mike Walker*	Wales	21 June 1996	30 April 1998	98	32	26	40	32.7	–	
John Faulkner	England	30 April 1998	12 June 1998	1	1	0	0	100.0	–	–
Bruce Rioch	Scotland	12 June 1998	13 March 2000	93	30	31	32	32.3	–	–
Bryan Hamilton	Northern Ireland	5 April 2000	4 December 2000	35	10	10	15	28.6	–	–
Nigel Worthington *	Northern Ireland	4 December 2000	2 October 2006	280	114	62	104	40.7	2003–04 Second tier champions	
Martin Hunter	England	2 October 2006	16 October 2006	1	0	1	0	0.0	–	
Peter Grant	Scotland	16 October 2006	9 October 2007	53	18	11	24	34.0	–	
Jim Duffy	Scotland	9 October 2007	30 October 2007	3	0	0	3	0.0	–	
Glenn Roeder	England	30 October 2007	16 January 2009	65	20	15	30	30.8	–	
Bryan Gunn (Note: Includes spell as caretaker manager.) *	Scotland	15 January 2009	14 August 2009	21	6	5	10	28.6	–	
Ian Butterworth *	England	14 August 2009	18 August 2009	2	0	1	1	0.0	–	
Paul Lambert *	Scotland	18 August 2009	1 June 2012	142	70	35	37	49.3	2009–10 Third tier champions 2010–11 Second tier runners-up	
Chris Hughton	Ireland	7 June 2012	6 April 2014	82	24	23	35	29.2	–	
Neil Adams *	England	6 April 2014	5 January 2015	32	11	8	13	34.3	–	
Mike Phelan *	England	5 January 2015	9 January 2015	0	0	0	0	0.0	–	–
Alex Neil	Scotland	9 January 2015	10 March 2017	108	45	23	40	41.7	2014–15 Second tier play-off winners	
Alan Irvine	Scotland	10 March 2017	25 May 2017	10	5	2	3	50.0	–	
Daniel Farke	Germany	25 May 2017	6 November 2021	208	87	49	72	41.8	2018–19 Second tier champions 2020–21 Second tier champions	
Dean Smith	England	15 November 2021	27 December 2022	56	16	12	28	28.6	–	
Allan Russell	England	27 December 2022	6 January 2023	2	0	1	1	0.0	–	
David Wagner	United States	6 January 2023	17 May 2024	75	31	17	27	41.3	–	
Johannes Hoff Thorup	Denmark	30 May 2024	22 April 2025	47	14	14	19	29.8	–	
Jack Wilshere	England	22 April 2025	3 May 2025	2	1	1	0	50.0	–	
Liam Manning	England	3 June 2025	8 November 2025	17	3	3	11	17.6	–	
Philippe Clement	Belgium	18 November 2025	Present	14	7	3	4	50.0	–	

== Bibliography ==
- Eastwood, John (1986). Canary Citizens: The Official History Of Norwich City F.C. Sudbury: Almeida. ISBN 0-7117-2020-7.
