= 2015 Football League Championship play-off final =

Association football match in London

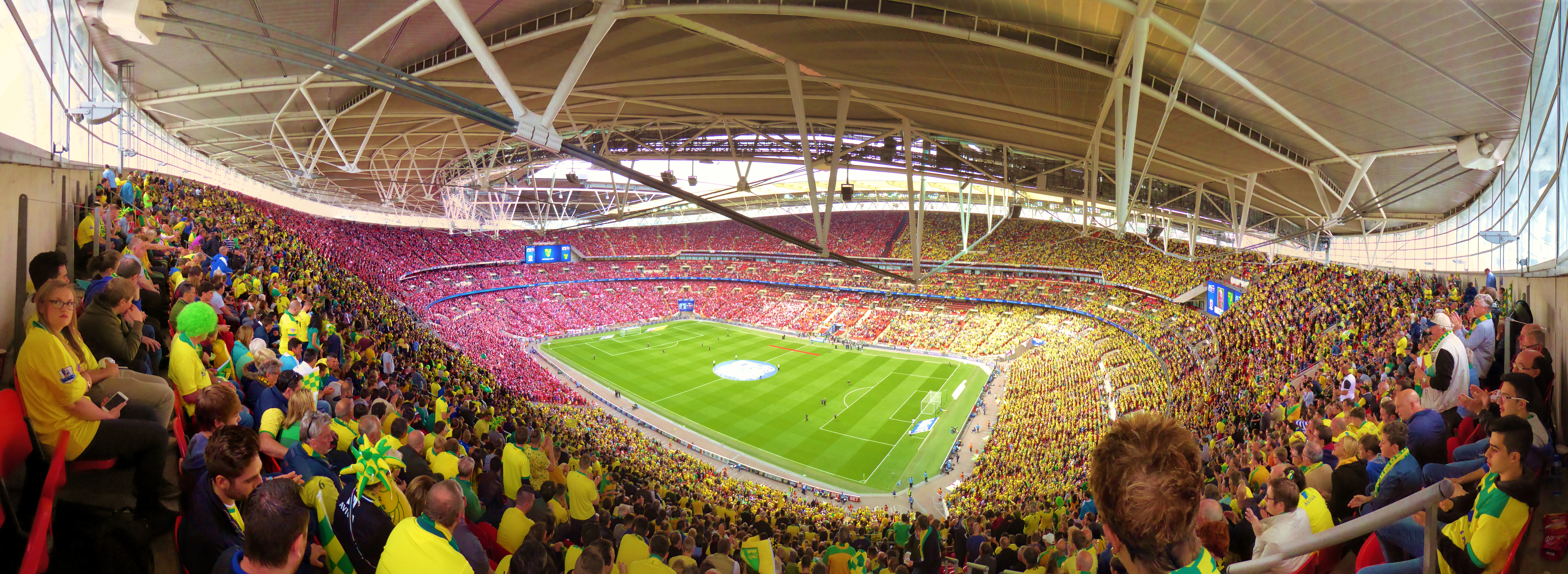
- Panorama of Wembley prior to the 2015 play-off final
- Event: 2014–15 Football League Championship
Middlesbrough	Norwich City
0	2
- Date: 25 May 2015
- Venue: Wembley Stadium, London
- Referee: Mike Dean
- Attendance: 85,656
- Weather: Sunny

The 2015 Football League Championship play-off final was an association football match which was played on 25 May 2015 at Wembley Stadium, London, between Middlesbrough and Norwich City. The match was to determine the third and final team to gain promotion from the Football League Championship, the second tier of English football, to the Premier League. The top two teams of the 2014–15 Football League Championship season gained automatic promotion to the Premier League, while the teams placed from third to sixth place in the table partook in play-off semi-finals; Norwich ended the season in third place while Middlesbrough finished fourth. The winners of these semi-finals competed for the final place for the 2015–16 season in the Premier League. Winning the game was estimated to be worth around £120 million to the successful team.

The 2015 final, refereed by Mike Dean, was watched by a crowd of more than 85,000 people in relatively sunny conditions. Norwich City won 2–0, with goals from Cameron Jerome and Nathan Redmond within the first fifteen minutes of the first half. It was Norwich's first game at Wembley since winning the 1985 Football League Cup Final and marked their return to the Premier League for the first time since their relegation in the 2013–14 season.

Norwich were relegated back to the Championship the following season, as they finished 19th in the 2015–16 Premier League. Middlesbrough finished the following season in second place and were automatically promoted to the Premier League for the 2016–17 season.

== Route to the final ==
Football League Championship final table, leading positions
Pos	Team	Pld	W	D	L	GF	GA	GD	Pts
1	Bournemouth	46	26	12	8	98	45	+53	90
2	Watford	46	27	8	11	91	50	+41	89
3	Norwich City	46	25	11	10	88	48	+40	86
4	Middlesbrough	46	25	10	11	68	37	+31	85
5	Brentford	46	23	9	14	78	59	+19	78
6	Ipswich Town	46	22	12	12	72	54	+18	78

Norwich City finished the regular 2014–15 season in third place in the Football League Championship, the second tier of the English football league system, one place ahead of Middlesbrough. Both therefore missed out on the two automatic places for promotion to the Premier League and instead took part in the play-offs to determine the third promoted team. Norwich finished three points behind Watford (who were promoted in second place) and four behind league winners Bournemouth. Middlesbrough ended the season one point behind Norwich.

Middlesbrough faced Brentford in their play-off semi-final, with the first leg being held at Griffin Park. Jelle Vossen gave the visitors a first-half lead with a header from an Adam Clayton cross but Andre Gray equalised eleven minutes into the second half after taking the ball from Middlesbrough goalkeeper Dimitrios Konstantopoulos. Brentford dominated the second half but deep into injury time, Fernando Amorebieta struck the winner and the game ended 2–1. The second leg, at the Riverside Stadium, once again saw Brentford dominate possession, but goals for Middlesbrough from Lee Tomlin, Kike and Albert Adomah meant the game ended 3–0 and the Teesside club qualified for the final 5–1 on aggregate.

Norwich City's semi-final opponents were local rivals Ipswich Town with the first leg being held at Portman Road. Jonny Howson put Norwich in the lead but Paul Anderson equalised in first-half injury time, and with no further goals, the match ended 1–1. The second leg, at Carrow Road, was goalless at half time, but four minutes into the second half, Ipswich's defender Christophe Berra conceded a penalty after he deliberately blocked Nathan Redmond's shot with his hand. Berra was shown a red card and Norwich took the lead through Wes Hoolahan's successful spot kick. Tommy Smith equalised with half an hour to go but goals from Redmond and Cameron Jerome ensured a 3–1 win on the day and a 4–2 aggregate victory for Norwich.

Middlesbrough			Round	Norwich City
Opponent	Result	Legs	Semi-finals	Opponent	Result	Legs
Brentford	5–1	2–1 away; 3–0 home		Ipswich Town	4–2	1–1 away; 3–1 home

== Match ==
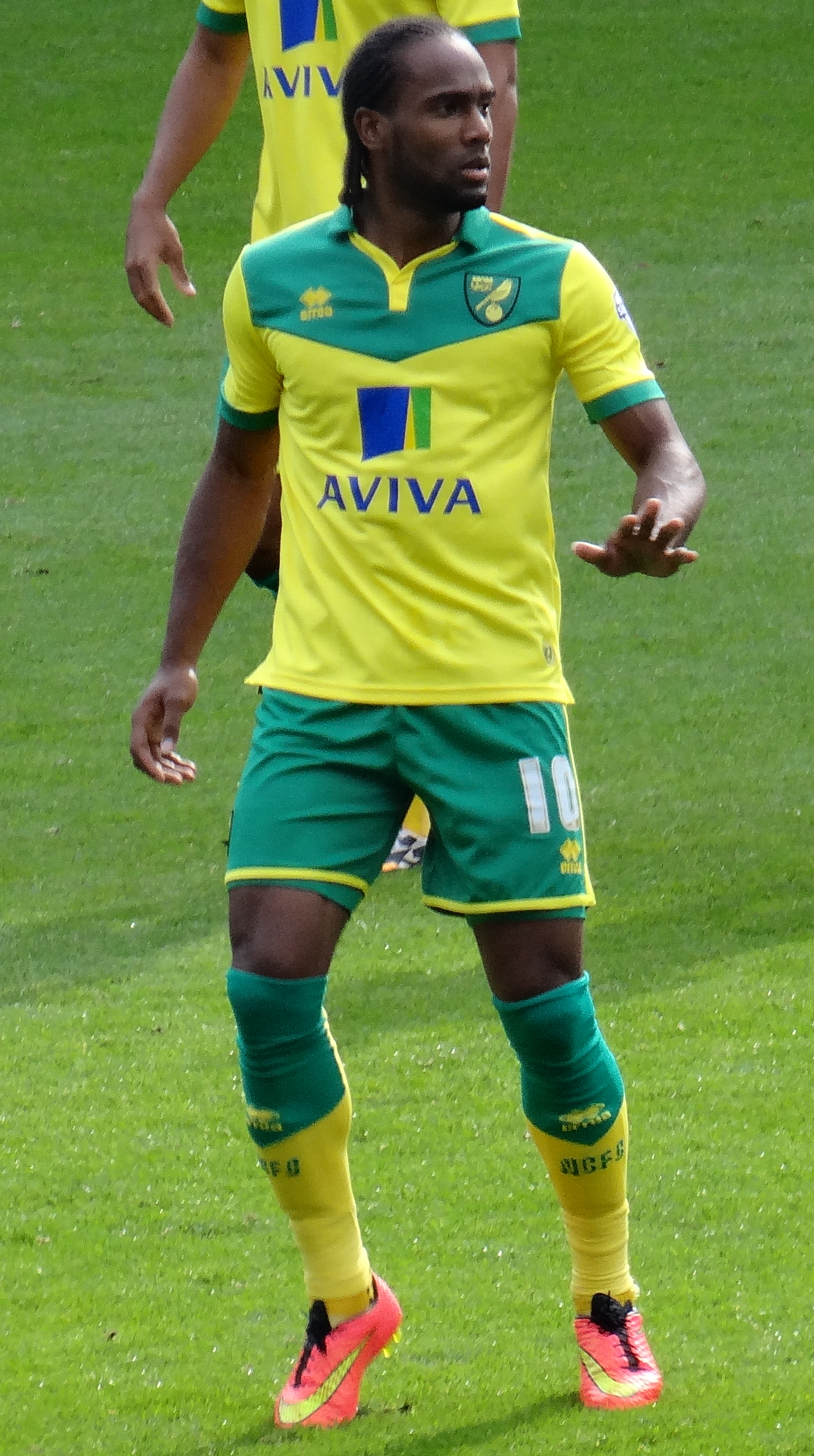
Cameron Jerome was Norwich's leading scorer.

=== Background ===
This was Norwich's second Championship play-off final, having lost the 2002 Football League First Division play-off final at the Millennium Stadium against Birmingham City on penalties. Middlesbrough were making their fifth trip to Wembley Stadium, having lost three previous matches all 2–0, the 1990 Full Members' Cup Final, the 1997 FA Cup Final and the 1998 Football League Cup Final. Their only goal at Wembley, came in the draw, in the 1997 Football League Cup Final, which went to a replay at Hillsborough. However they did win the 1988 Football League Second Division play-off final on aggregate against First Division Chelsea, which was determined over two legs, at their respective grounds. During the regular season, Norwich had lost both times against Middlesbrough: a 4–0 defeat at the Riverside in November 2014, their heaviest of the season, was followed by a 1–0 loss at Carrow Road in April 2015, a game which consigned Norwich to the play-offs. Patrick Bamford, on loan from Chelsea, was Middlesbrough's top scorer with 17 goals and had also been recently selected as the "Championship Player of the Year" at the recent Football League Awards, while Norwich's Jerome had scored the most for his team with 20. The Teesside club's Konstantopoulos had also kept more clean sheets than any other goalkeeper.

On 19 May Wembley Stadium apologised to Middlesbrough supporters for issuing tickets with the team's name misspelled as "Middlesborough". Norwich received an allocation of 38,888 tickets in the East End of Wembley which were sold exclusively to season ticket holders and club members, while Middlesbrough were allocated 38,000 in the West End. The final was refereed by Mike Dean, with assistant referees Stuart Burt and Simon Long, and Roger East acting as the fourth official. It was reported in the media and press that the match was worth around £120 million to the winning club over three years through sponsorship and television deals. Norwich were considered narrow favourites by bookmakers to win the match which was broadcast in the UK on Sky Sports.

Middlesbrough's team bus was delayed and required a police escort to assist its passage to Wembley, where it arrived shortly after 2 p.m. Norwich City's starting eleven was unchanged from their second semi-final leg victory over Ipswich, and Lewis Grabban was named as a substitute, returning from suspension. Bamford returned to Middlesbrough's starting lineup having recovered from an ankle injury picked up in the first leg of the semi-finals against Brentford and replaced Kike.

=== First half ===
Norwich kicked the match off at around 3 p.m. in relatively sunny conditions in front of a crowd of 85,656. In the 3rd minute, Norwich's Bradley Johnson narrowly missed Redmond's cross. Five minutes later Steven Whittaker's ball into the box evaded Johnson, who then struck the bar from 18 yards (16 m). Middlesbrough broke away and Vossen hit Norwich's bar from 25 yards (23 m). Former Leicester City player Steve Claridge, working on BBC Radio 5 Live suggested that "you will not get two sweeter strikes. They were marvellous strikes! What a brilliant passage of play." In the 12th minute, Jerome took the ball from Middlesbrough's Daniel Ayala and took it into the box, bringing Konstantopoulos out and allowing the Norwich striker to beat him at the near post. Three minutes later, Whittaker passed the ball into Middlesbrough's penalty area, allowing Redmond to run on to it and score, making it 2–0. Former Blackpool manager Ian Holloway opined: "Norwich's play looks like Premier League ... Middlesbrough seemed to have been knocked sideways." In the 23rd minute, Middlesbrough won their first corner but the delivery from their captain Grant Leadbitter was cleared by Norwich. Vossen headed wide for Middlesbrough on 27 minutes and nine minutes later, he was off-target with another header. Two minutes of additional time were played before the half ended, with the East Anglian club leading 2–0.

=== Second half ===
Middlesbrough made a half-time substitution, the first replacement of the match, with Emilio Nsue coming on for Dean Whitehead. The first opportunity of the half fell to Norwich's Hoolahan whose shot was tame. Ayala then headed over from a corner after a cross from Adomah was deflected out by Sébastien Bassong. In the 56th minute, Vossen was booked for diving, and three minutes later, Bamford's shot was saved by the Norwich goalkeeper John Ruddy. Howson was then shown a yellow card for a foul on Tomlin, before another Adomah cross is cleared by Norwich. In the 68th minute, Middlesbrough made their second substitution, replacing Vossen with Kike. Two minutes later, after Bamford missed a chance on a through ball, Kike's ball into the box failed to find any teammates. Norwich made a double substitution in the 74th minute, with Grabban and Graham Dorrans coming on for Jerome and Hoolahan. Five minutes after his introduction, Dorrans' advance was stopped illegally by Kike and the resulting free kick was sent wide of the post by Redmond. Middlesbrough's claim for a penalty in the 81st minute after an alleged handball were dismissed by the referee Mike Dean. Ayala's header then beat Ruddy but was cleared off the line by Grabban to maintain Norwich's advantage. With three minutes of regular time remaining, Norwich made their third and final substitution, with Redmond being replaced by Gary O'Neil. Four minutes of additional time were played and the match ended with Norwich winning 2–0 and promotion back to the Premier League.

=== Details ===
25 May 2015
15:00

Middlesbrough	0–2	Norwich City
	Report	Jerome 12'; Redmond 15'

Wembley Stadium, London
Attendance: 85,656
Referee: Mike Dean

Middlesbrough	Norwich City

GK	13	Dimitrios Konstantopoulos
RB	18	Dean Whitehead		(substituted off) 46'
CB	4	Daniel Ayala
CB	6	Ben Gibson
LB	3	George Friend
RM	27	Albert Adomah
CM	7	Grant Leadbitter (c)
CM	8	Adam Clayton
LM	10	Lee Tomlin
SS	21	Jelle Vossen	(yellow card) 56'	(substituted off) 68'
CF	23	Patrick Bamford
Substitutes:
GK	12	Connor Ripley
DF	24	Emilio Nsue		(substituted on) 46'
DF	29	Fernando Amorebieta
DF	39	Jonathan Woodgate
MF	20	Adam Reach
MF	34	Adam Forshaw
FW	9	Kike		(substituted on) 68'
Manager:
Aitor Karanka

GK	1	John Ruddy
RB	2	Steven Whittaker
CB	5	Russell Martin (c)
CB	30	Sébastien Bassong
LB	23	Martin Olsson
DM	27	Alexander Tettey
RM	22	Nathan Redmond		(substituted off) 87'
CM	8	Jonny Howson	(yellow card) 62'
CM	14	Wes Hoolahan		(substituted off) 75'
LM	4	Bradley Johnson
CF	10	Cameron Jerome		(substituted off) 74'
Substitutes:
GK	26	Declan Rudd
DF	24	Ryan Bennett
MF	17	Elliott Bennett
MF	28	Gary O'Neil		(substituted on) 87'
MF	41	Graham Dorrans		(substituted on) 75'
FW	7	Lewis Grabban		(substituted on) 74'
FW	11	Gary Hooper
Manager:
Alex Neil

Match rules:
- 90 minutes.
- 30 minutes of extra time if necessary.
- Penalty shoot-out if scores still level.
- Seven named substitutes.
- Maximum of three substitutions.

=== Statistics ===
Statistic	Middlesbrough	Norwich City
Total shots	8	7
Shots on target	1	4
Ball possession	57%	43%
Corner kicks	6	2
Fouls committed	8	5
Yellow cards	1	1
Red cards	0	0

== Post-match ==
The Norwich captain Russell Martin described his team's performance as "our best of the season so far". His teammate Jerome noted that Norwich and Middlesbrough "were both unlucky to miss out on automatic promotion ... We moved the ball well and we were deserved winners." Their manager, Alex Neil observed that "big players arrive on the big stage and you saw that in the first 20 minutes – we were unbelievable." Middlesbrough's head coach Aitor Karanka was graceful in defeat, acknowledging that Norwich "played better, they didn't make mistakes, we made two mistakes, and in a final you pay for those mistakes."

Norwich ended the next season in 19th position in the 2015–16 Premier League, and were relegated back to the Championship. Middlesbrough finished the following season in second place in the 2015–16 Football League Championship, securing automatic promotion to the Premier League for the 2016-17 season.
