= David Corner =

David Corner may refer to:

- David Gregor Corner, German monk
- David Corner (footballer), English professional footballer
