= 2015–16 Premier League =

Football season in England

Premier League
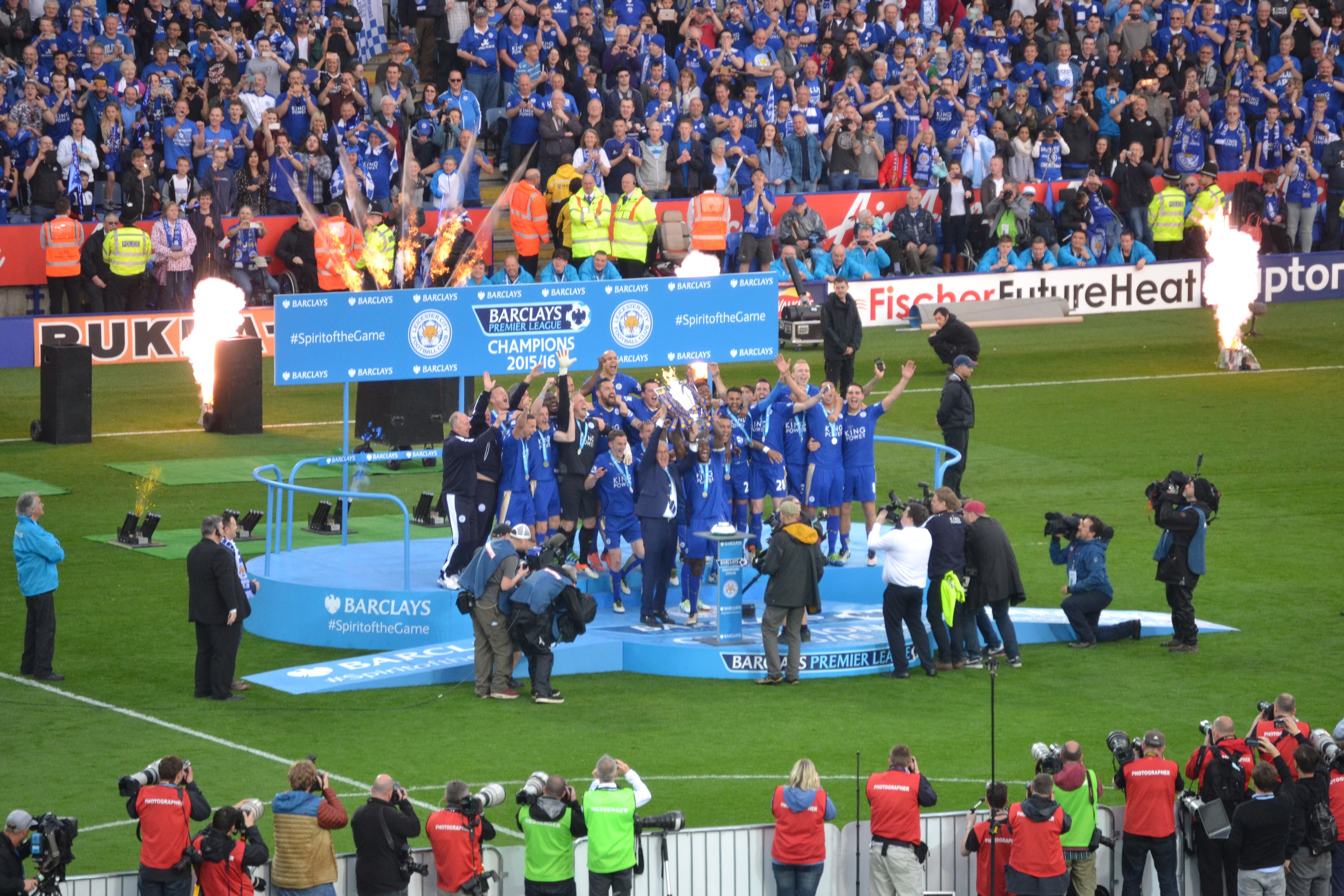
- Season: 2015–16
- Dates: 8 August 2015 – 17 May 2016
- Champions: Leicester City; 1st Premier League title 1st English title
- Relegated: Newcastle United; Norwich City; Aston Villa
- Champions League: Leicester City; Arsenal; Tottenham Hotspur; Manchester City
- Europa League: Manchester United; Southampton; West Ham United
- Matches: 380
- Goals: 1,026 (2.7 per match)
- Top goalscorer: Harry Kane (25 goals)
- Best goalkeeper: Petr Čech (16 clean sheets)
- Biggest home win: Manchester City 6–1 Newcastle United (3 October 2015)
- Biggest away win: Aston Villa 0–6 Liverpool (14 February 2016)
- Highest scoring: Norwich City 4–5 Liverpool (23 January 2016)
- Longest winning run: 6 matches Tottenham Hotspur
- Longest unbeaten run: 15 matches Chelsea
- Longest winless run: 19 matches Aston Villa
- Longest losing run: 11 matches Aston Villa
- Highest attendance: 75,415; Manchester United 2–1 Swansea City (2 January 2016)
- Lowest attendance: 10,863; Bournemouth 1–3 Stoke City (13 February 2016)
- Total attendance: 13,851,698
- Average attendance: 36,451

The 2015–16 Premier League (known as the Barclays Premier League for sponsorship reasons) was the 24th season of the Premier League, the top English professional league for association football clubs, since its establishment in 1992, and the 117th season of top-flight English football overall. The season began on 8 August 2015, and was scheduled to conclude on 15 May 2016. However, the match between Manchester United and Bournemouth on the final day was postponed to 17 May 2016 due to a suspicious package found at Old Trafford.

Chelsea began the season as defending champions of the 2014–15 season. Bournemouth, Watford and Norwich City entered as the three promoted teams from the 2014–15 Football League Championship.

Leicester City, managed by Italian Claudio Ranieri, were crowned champions for the first time in their 132-year history (with two games to spare), becoming the 24th club to become English football champions, and the sixth club to win the Premier League. Many commentators consider this to be one of the greatest sporting shocks in history, especially when it is considered that Leicester spent a great deal of the previous season at the bottom of the table before rallying towards the season's end to finish 14th. At the beginning of the season, bookmakers had given Leicester City odds of 5000/1 to win the league. On 28 November 2015, Leicester striker Jamie Vardy set a new record by scoring in 11 consecutive matches with his goal against Manchester United, surpassing Ruud van Nistelrooy's Premier League record of 10 straight games with a goal, which he set in 2003. Aston Villa, one of seven teams who had played in the Premier League since its inaugural season, were relegated from the top flight in England for the first time since 1987.

This was the last season in which the league was sponsored by Barclays; effective the following season onwards, it would simply be known as the Premier League, with no sponsors attached.

An independent commission later found that Manchester City breached Premier League financial rules during this season, part of a pattern of breaches spanning 2009–2018.

== Summary ==
Leicester City were the surprise of the season. Following their late escape from relegation in the previous season many pundits had predicted that they would be relegated, and bookmakers gave 5,000–1 odds on them winning the title. After the dismissal of manager Nigel Pearson, they began the new season with Italian Claudio Ranieri in charge. Pearson had been known for his short temper with the press, while Ranieri has a reputation for good humour. The appointment was met with scepticism by pundits, including Leicester fan and former player Gary Lineker, as Ranieri had recently been sacked from his previous post as manager of the Greece national team after suffering a humiliating defeat to the Faroe Islands in his last game in charge.

Despite winning their opening game against Sunderland and topping the table, they dropped back following a 5–2 home defeat to Arsenal in September. However, aided by Jamie Vardy's record feat of scoring in eleven consecutive Premier League games, (Note: This is a Premier League record. The all-time, first-tier of English football record stands at 12, by Jimmy Dunne in 1932.) they then remained unbeaten – and returned to the top of the table – until 26 December, when a 1–0 defeat to Liverpool dropped them to second place. They returned to the top after a 1–1 draw with Aston Villa on 16 January, and remained there for the rest of the season. Following a 2–2 draw between Chelsea and Tottenham Hotspur at Stamford Bridge on 2 May 2016, and having two more games to play, Leicester City were confirmed champions, their first title in the top flight of English football, eclipsing the runners-up spot they reached in 1929.

Defending champions Chelsea sacked manager José Mourinho in December while in 16th place and eventually failed to qualify for European football for the first time in two decades. Eden Hazard, the previous season's PFA Players' Player of the Year, did not score a league goal until late April. They eventually finished 10th, breaking the record for lowest finish for a Premier League title holder – 7th, held jointly by Blackburn Rovers in 1995–96 and Manchester United in 2013–14. This record only stood for one year, as Leicester City finished 12th the following season.

Arsenal, looking for their first title since 2004 and following a poor start, improved and in early January took the top spot from Leicester. However, a poor run of results, including draws with Liverpool, Stoke City and Southampton, and a loss to Chelsea saw them drop to fourth by mid-February. They remained in contention, but draws with West Ham United, Sunderland and Crystal Palace in April saw their title hopes vanish.

Meanwhile, Arsenal's London rivals Tottenham Hotspur won six matches in a row, and when Arsenal lost to Manchester United at the end of February, Tottenham leapfrogged them into second place, where they remained until the final weekend of the season. Draws with West Bromwich Albion and Chelsea—in a game now known as the ‘Battle of the Bridge’—prevented them from winning their first league title since 1961. After a 2–1 home loss to Southampton and a 5–1 defeat away to Newcastle United in their final two matches, Tottenham ended the season in third place, one point behind Arsenal.

West Ham United, in their final season at the Boleyn Ground after 112 years, achieved 62 points, a club record for a Premier League campaign. It was also the first Premier League season where they had finished with a positive goal difference (+14) and West Ham's eight defeats was also a club record for the fewest losses suffered in a Premier League season.

Aston Villa, a presence in the Premier League since the league's foundation in 1992 and present in the top division since the 1988–89 season, were the first team to be relegated, after a 1–0 loss at Manchester United on 16 April. On 11 May, Sunderland won 3–0 against Everton, a result which relegated both Newcastle United and Norwich City with one game remaining.

All the final fixtures of the season were scheduled for 15 May and were to kick off at the same time. However, Manchester United's home game against Bournemouth was called off after Old Trafford was evacuated because of the discovery of a suspicious device, which was destroyed in a controlled explosion. It was confirmed to be an accidental leftover from a training exercise. The match was played two days later on 17 May, with United winning 3–1.

=== Reactions ===
The unlikely nature of Leicester's title led to a flood of coverage from across the globe. Prime Minister David Cameron tweeted his congratulations, saying it was "An extraordinary, thoroughly deserved, Premier League title". Congratulations were also sent by the Italian Prime Minister Matteo Renzi, who praised his compatriot Ranieri.

Premier League chief executive Richard Scudamore called it "probably the biggest sporting story ever". Former Leicester manager Martin O'Neill described it as the "greatest achievement, obviously, of this century". Gary Lineker, the former Leicester striker who led a consortium that saved the club from administration in 2002, had said he would host the BBC football show Match of the Day in his underwear if Leicester won the title. After they won the title, he did indeed present the show clad only in boxer shorts. (Note: A promise which he later kept.) He said: "There were no odds that I would have taken at the start of the season. No odds. You could have given me 10 million to one and I'd have said 'Nah, it's a waste of a quid'". José Mourinho, manager of 2015 champions Chelsea and Ranieri's replacement at the same team eleven years earlier, sent his congratulations, saying: "I lost my title to Claudio Ranieri and it is with incredible emotion that I live this magic moment in his career." Ranieri said, after winning his first title at the age of 64, that he would not have appreciated it as a young man: "Now I am an old man I can feel it much better."

The long odds that bookmakers had given at the start of the season on victory for Leicester led to them incurring losses of up to £25 million, with one punter winning over £100,000, having wagered £20 at the original 5,000–1 odds; the largest payout was £200,000 to an anonymous bettor who wagered £100 on the team in October when the odds had gone down to 2,000–1.

Superstitious claims of phenomena helping Leicester win the league include the club's Thai owners engaging Buddhist monks to bless the players, and the reburial of King Richard III in the city's cathedral in March 2015.

== Teams ==
Twenty teams competed in the league – the top seventeen teams from the previous season and the three teams promoted from the Championship. The promoted teams were Bournemouth (playing in the top flight for the first time ever), Watford (returning to the top flight after eight years) and Norwich City (returning after a season's absence). They replaced Hull City (relegated to the Championship after a two-year spell in the top flight), Burnley and Queens Park Rangers (both teams relegated after a season's presence).

=== Stadiums and locations ===
Locations of the 2015–16 Premier League teams
Greater London Premier League football clubs

Note: Table lists in alphabetical order.

Team	Location	Stadium	Capacity
Arsenal	London (Holloway)	Emirates Stadium	60,260
Aston Villa	Birmingham	Villa Park	42,660
Bournemouth	Bournemouth	Dean Court	11,464
Chelsea	London (Fulham)	Stamford Bridge	41,798
Crystal Palace	London (Selhurst)	Selhurst Park	25,073
Everton	Liverpool (Walton)	Goodison Park	39,898
Leicester City	Leicester	King Power Stadium	32,500
Liverpool	Liverpool (Anfield)	Anfield	44,742
Manchester City	Manchester (Bradford)	City of Manchester Stadium	55,097
Manchester United	Manchester (Old Trafford)	Old Trafford	76,153
Newcastle United	Newcastle upon Tyne	St James' Park	52,338
Norwich City	Norwich	Carrow Road	27,010
Southampton	Southampton	St Mary's Stadium	32,506
Stoke City	Stoke-on-Trent	Britannia Stadium	27,740
Sunderland	Sunderland	Stadium of Light	48,707
Swansea City	Swansea	Liberty Stadium	20,909
Tottenham Hotspur	London (Tottenham)	White Hart Lane	36,284
Watford	Watford	Vicarage Road	21,500
West Bromwich Albion	West Bromwich	The Hawthorns	26,850
West Ham United	London (Upton Park)	Boleyn Ground (Note: This was West Ham United's last season at Boleyn Ground as they were set to relocate to the London Stadium at the start of the following season.)	35,345

=== Personnel and kits ===
Team	Manager	Captain	Kit manufacturer	Shirt sponsor
Arsenal	(France) Arsène Wenger	(Spain) Mikel Arteta	Puma	Emirates
Aston Villa	(Scotland) Eric Black (caretaker)	(England) Micah Richards	Macron	Intuit QuickBooks
Bournemouth	(England) Eddie Howe	(England) Tommy Elphick	JD Sports	Mansion Group
Chelsea	(Netherlands) Guus Hiddink (caretaker)	(England) John Terry	Adidas	Yokohama
Crystal Palace	(England) Alan Pardew	(Australia) Mile Jedinak	Macron	Mansion Group
Everton	(England) David Unsworth (England) Joe Royle (caretakers)	(England) Phil Jagielka	Umbro	Chang
Leicester City	(Italy) Claudio Ranieri	(Jamaica) Wes Morgan	Puma	King Power
Liverpool	(Germany) Jürgen Klopp	(England) Jordan Henderson	New Balance	Standard Chartered
Manchester City	(Chile) Manuel Pellegrini	(Belgium) Vincent Kompany	Nike	Etihad Airways
Manchester United	(Netherlands) Louis van Gaal	(England) Wayne Rooney	Adidas	Chevrolet
Newcastle United	(Spain) Rafael Benítez	(Argentina) Fabricio Coloccini	Puma	Wonga
Norwich City	(Scotland) Alex Neil	(Scotland) Russell Martin	Erreà	Aviva
Southampton	(Netherlands) Ronald Koeman	(Portugal) José Fonte	Adidas	Veho
Stoke City	(Wales) Mark Hughes	(England) Ryan Shawcross	New Balance	Bet365
Sunderland	(England) Sam Allardyce	(Republic of Ireland) John O'Shea	Adidas	Dafabet
Swansea City	(Italy) Francesco Guidolin	(Wales) Ashley Williams	Adidas	GWFX
Tottenham Hotspur	(Argentina) Mauricio Pochettino	(France) Hugo Lloris	Under Armour	AIA
Watford	(Spain) Quique Sánchez Flores	(England) Troy Deeney	Puma	138.com
West Bromwich Albion	(Wales) Tony Pulis	(Scotland) Darren Fletcher	Adidas	Tlcbet
West Ham United	(Croatia) Slaven Bilić	(England) Mark Noble	Umbro	Betway

- Additionally, referee kits are made by Nike, sponsored by EA Sports, and Nike has a new match ball, the Ordem Premier League.

=== Managerial changes ===
Team	Outgoing manager	Manner of departure	Date of vacancy	Position in table	Incoming manager	Date of appointment
West Ham United	(England) Sam Allardyce	End of contract	24 May 2015	Pre-season	(Croatia) Slaven Bilić	9 June 2015
Watford	(Serbia) Slaviša Jokanović	End of contract	5 June 2015	Pre-season	(Spain) Quique Sánchez Flores	5 June 2015
Newcastle United	(England) John Carver	Sacked	9 June 2015	Pre-season	(England) Steve McClaren	10 June 2015
Leicester City	(England) Nigel Pearson	Sacked	30 June 2015	Pre-season	(Italy) Claudio Ranieri	13 July 2015
Sunderland	(Netherlands) Dick Advocaat	Resigned	4 October 2015	19th	(England) Sam Allardyce	9 October 2015
Liverpool	(Northern Ireland) Brendan Rodgers	Sacked	4 October 2015	10th	(Germany) Jürgen Klopp	8 October 2015
Aston Villa	(England) Tim Sherwood	Sacked	25 October 2015	19th	(France) Rémi Garde	2 November 2015
Swansea City	(England) Garry Monk	Sacked	9 December 2015	15th	(Wales) Alan Curtis	7 January 2016
Chelsea	(Portugal) José Mourinho	Sacked	17 December 2015	16th	(Netherlands) Guus Hiddink	19 December 2015
Swansea City	(Wales) Alan Curtis	End of caretaker spell	18 January 2016	18th	(Italy) Francesco Guidolin	18 January 2016
Newcastle United	(England) Steve McClaren	Sacked	11 March 2016	19th	(Spain) Rafael Benítez	11 March 2016
Aston Villa	(France) Rémi Garde	Mutual consent	29 March 2016	20th	(Scotland) Eric Black	29 March 2016
Everton	(Spain) Roberto Martínez	Sacked	12 May 2016	12th	(England) David Unsworth (England) Joe Royle (caretakers)	12 May 2016

== League table ==
Pos	Team	Pld	W	D	L	GF	GA	GD	Pts	Qualification or relegation
1	Leicester City (C)	38	23	12	3	68	36	+32	81	Qualification for the Champions League group stage
2	Arsenal	38	20	11	7	65	36	+29	71	Qualification for the Champions League group stage
3	Tottenham Hotspur	38	19	13	6	69	35	+34	70	Qualification for the Champions League group stage
4	Manchester City	38	19	9	10	71	41	+30	66	Qualification for the Champions League play-off round
5	Manchester United	38	19	9	10	49	35	+14	66	Qualification for the Europa League group stage (Note: Manchester United qualified for the Europa League group stage by winning the 2015–16 FA Cup. As they had also qualified by their virtue of their league position (5th), this spot was passed to the next-highest ranked team (6th), Southampton.)
6	Southampton	38	18	9	11	59	41	+18	63	Qualification for the Europa League group stage
7	West Ham United	38	16	14	8	65	51	+14	62	Qualification for the Europa League third qualifying round (Note: Manchester City qualified for the Europa League third qualifying round by winning the 2015–16 Football League Cup. However, since they already qualified for European competition based on their league position, the spot awarded to the League Cup winners was passed to the next best-placed team (seventh-placed West Ham United).)
8	Liverpool	38	16	12	10	63	50	+13	60	
9	Stoke City	38	14	9	15	41	55	−14	51	
10	Chelsea	38	12	14	12	59	53	+6	50	
11	Everton	38	11	14	13	59	55	+4	47	
12	Swansea City	38	12	11	15	42	52	−10	47	
13	Watford	38	12	9	17	40	50	−10	45	
14	West Bromwich Albion	38	10	13	15	34	48	−14	43	
15	Crystal Palace	38	11	9	18	39	51	−12	42	
16	Bournemouth	38	11	9	18	45	67	−22	42	
17	Sunderland	38	9	12	17	48	62	−14	39	
18	Newcastle United (R)	38	9	10	19	44	65	−21	37	Relegation to EFL Championship
19	Norwich City (R)	38	9	7	22	39	67	−28	34	Relegation to EFL Championship
20	Aston Villa (R)	38	3	8	27	27	76	−49	17	Relegation to EFL Championship

Source: Barclays Premier League
Rules for classification: 1) Points; 2) Goal difference; 3) Goals scored; 4) Play-offs (only if needed to decide champion, teams for relegation or teams for UEFA competitions).
(C) Champions; (R) Relegated

== Results ==
Home \ Away	ARS	AVL	BOU	CHE	CRY	EVE	LEI	LIV	MCI	MUN	NEW	NOR	SOU	STK	SUN	SWA	TOT	WAT	WBA	WHU
Arsenal	—	4–0	2–0	0–1	1–1	2–1	2–1	0–0	2–1	3–0	1–0	1–0	0–0	2–0	3–1	1–2	1–1	4–0	2–0	0–2
Aston Villa	0–2	—	1–2	0–4	1–0	1–3	1–1	0–6	0–0	0–1	0–0	2–0	2–4	0–1	2–2	1–2	0–2	2–3	0–1	1–1
Bournemouth	0–2	0–1	—	1–4	0–0	3–3	1–1	1–2	0–4	2–1	0–1	3–0	2–0	1–3	2–0	3–2	1–5	1–1	1–1	1–3
Chelsea	2–0	2–0	0–1	—	1–2	3–3	1–1	1–3	0–3	1–1	5–1	1–0	1–3	1–1	3–1	2–2	2–2	2–2	2–2	2–2
Crystal Palace	1–2	2–1	1–2	0–3	—	0–0	0–1	1–2	0–1	0–0	5–1	1–0	1–0	2–1	0–1	0–0	1–3	1–2	2–0	1–3
Everton	0–2	4–0	2–1	3–1	1–1	—	2–3	1–1	0–2	0–3	3–0	3–0	1–1	3–4	6–2	1–2	1–1	2–2	0–1	2–3
Leicester City	2–5	3–2	0–0	2–1	1–0	3–1	—	2–0	0–0	1–1	1–0	1–0	1–0	3–0	4–2	4–0	1–1	2–1	2–2	2–2
Liverpool	3–3	3–2	1–0	1–1	1–2	4–0	1–0	—	3–0	0–1	2–2	1–1	1–1	4–1	2–2	1–0	1–1	2–0	2–2	0–3
Manchester City	2–2	4–0	5–1	3–0	4–0	0–0	1–3	1–4	—	0–1	6–1	2–1	3–1	4–0	4–1	2–1	1–2	2–0	2–1	1–2
Manchester United	3–2	1–0	3–1	0–0	2–0	1–0	1–1	3–1	0–0	—	0–0	1–2	0–1	3–0	3–0	2–1	1–0	1–0	2–0	0–0
Newcastle United	0–1	1–1	1–3	2–2	1–0	0–1	0–3	2–0	1–1	3–3	—	6–2	2–2	0–0	1–1	3–0	5–1	1–2	1–0	2–1
Norwich City	1–1	2–0	3–1	1–2	1–3	1–1	1–2	4–5	0–0	0–1	3–2	—	1–0	1–1	0–3	1–0	0–3	4–2	0–1	2–2
Southampton	4–0	1–1	2–0	1–2	4–1	0–3	2–2	3–2	4–2	2–3	3–1	3–0	—	0–1	1–1	3–1	0–2	2–0	3–0	1–0
Stoke City	0–0	2–1	2–1	1–0	1–2	0–3	2–2	0–1	2–0	2–0	1–0	3–1	1–2	—	1–1	2–2	0–4	0–2	0–1	2–1
Sunderland	0–0	3–1	1–1	3–2	2–2	3–0	0–2	0–1	0–1	2–1	3–0	1–3	0–1	2–0	—	1–1	0–1	0–1	0–0	2–2
Swansea City	0–3	1–0	2–2	1–0	1–1	0–0	0–3	3–1	1–1	2–1	2–0	1–0	0–1	0–1	2–4	—	2–2	1–0	1–0	0–0
Tottenham Hotspur	2–2	3–1	3–0	0–0	1–0	0–0	0–1	0–0	4–1	3–0	1–2	3–0	1–2	2–2	4–1	2–1	—	1–0	1–1	4–1
Watford	0–3	3–2	0–0	0–0	0–1	1–1	0–1	3–0	1–2	1–2	2–1	2–0	0–0	1–2	2–2	1–0	1–2	—	0–0	2–0
West Bromwich Albion	2–1	0–0	1–2	2–3	3–2	2–3	2–3	1–1	0–3	1–0	1–0	0–1	0–0	2–1	1–0	1–1	1–1	0–1	—	0–3
West Ham United	3–3	2–0	3–4	2–1	2–2	1–1	1–2	2–0	2–2	3–2	2–0	2–2	2–1	0–0	1–0	1–4	1–0	3–1	1–1	—

Source: Barclays Premier League results
Legend: Blue = home team win; Yellow = draw; Red = away team win.

== Season statistics ==
=== Scoring ===
==== Top scorers ====
Rank	Player	Club	Goals
1	(England) Harry Kane	Tottenham Hotspur	25
2	(Argentina) Sergio Agüero	Manchester City	24
2	(England) Jamie Vardy	Leicester City	24
4	(Belgium) Romelu Lukaku	Everton	18
5	(Algeria) Riyad Mahrez	Leicester City	17
6	(France) Olivier Giroud	Arsenal	16
7	(England) Jermain Defoe	Sunderland	15
7	(Nigeria) Odion Ighalo	Watford	15
9	(England) Troy Deeney	Watford	13
9	(Chile) Alexis Sánchez	Arsenal	13

==== Hat-tricks ====
Player	For	Against	Result	Date	Ref
(England) Callum Wilson	Bournemouth	West Ham United	4–3 (A)	22 August 2015	
(Scotland) Steven Naismith	Everton	Chelsea	3–1 (H)	12 September 2015	
(Chile) Alexis Sánchez	Arsenal	Leicester City	5–2 (A)	26 September 2015	
(Argentina) Sergio Agüero^{5}	Manchester City	Newcastle United	6–1 (H)	3 October 2015	
(England) Raheem Sterling	Manchester City	Bournemouth	5–1 (H)	17 October 2015	
(Netherlands) Georginio Wijnaldum^{4}	Newcastle United	Norwich City	6–2 (H)	18 October 2015	
(England) Harry Kane	Tottenham Hotspur	Bournemouth	5–1 (A)	25 October 2015	
(Ivory Coast) Arouna Koné	Everton	Sunderland	6–2 (H)	1 November 2015	
(Algeria) Riyad Mahrez	Leicester City	Swansea City	3–0 (A)	5 December 2015	
(England) Jermain Defoe	Sunderland	Swansea City	4–2 (A)	13 January 2016	
(England) Andy Carroll	West Ham United	Arsenal	3–3 (H)	9 April 2016	
(Argentina) Sergio Agüero	Manchester City	Chelsea	3–0 (A)	16 April 2016	
(Senegal) Sadio Mané	Southampton	Manchester City	4–2 (H)	1 May 2016	
(France) Olivier Giroud	Arsenal	Aston Villa	4–0 (H)	15 May 2016	

Notes

^{4} Player scored 4 goals
^{5} Player scored 5 goals
(H) – Home team
(A) – Away team

=== Clean sheets ===
Rank	Player	Club	Clean sheets
1	(Czech Republic) Petr Čech	Arsenal	16
2	(Spain) David de Gea	Manchester United	15
2	(England) Joe Hart	Manchester City	15
2	(Denmark) Kasper Schmeichel	Leicester City	15
5	(France) Hugo Lloris	Tottenham Hotspur	13
6	(Brazil) Heurelho Gomes	Watford	11
6	(Belgium) Simon Mignolet	Liverpool	11
8	(England) Jack Butland	Stoke City	10
9	(Spain) Adrián	West Ham United	9
9	(Poland) Łukasz Fabiański	Swansea City	9

=== Discipline ===
==== Player ====
- Most yellow cards: 11
  - (England) Jack Colback (Newcastle United)
- Most red cards: 3
  - (Kenya) Victor Wanyama (Southampton)

==== Club ====
- Most yellow cards: 74
  - Aston Villa
- Most red cards: 6
  - Southampton

== Awards ==
=== Monthly awards ===
Month	Manager of the Month		Player of the Month		Reference
Month	Manager	Club	Player	Club	Reference
August	(Chile) Manuel Pellegrini	Manchester City	(Ghana) André Ayew	Swansea City	
September	(Argentina) Mauricio Pochettino	Tottenham Hotspur	(France) Anthony Martial	Manchester United	
October	(France) Arsène Wenger	Arsenal	(England) Jamie Vardy	Leicester City	
November	(Italy) Claudio Ranieri	Leicester City	(England) Jamie Vardy	Leicester City	
December	(Spain) Quique Sánchez Flores	Watford	(Nigeria) Odion Ighalo	Watford	
January	(Netherlands) Ronald Koeman	Southampton	(Argentina) Sergio Agüero	Manchester City	
February	(Argentina) Mauricio Pochettino	Tottenham Hotspur	(England) Fraser Forster	Southampton	
March	(Italy) Claudio Ranieri	Leicester City	(England) Harry Kane	Tottenham Hotspur	
April	(Italy) Claudio Ranieri	Leicester City	(Argentina) Sergio Agüero	Manchester City	

=== Annual awards ===
Award	Winner	Club
Premier League Manager of the Season	(Italy) Claudio Ranieri	Leicester City
Premier League Player of the Season	(England) Jamie Vardy	Leicester City
PFA Players' Player of the Year	(Algeria) Riyad Mahrez	Leicester City
PFA Young Player of the Year	(England) Dele Alli	Tottenham Hotspur
FWA Footballer of the Year	(England) Jamie Vardy	Leicester City

PFA Team of the Year
Goalkeeper	(Spain) David de Gea (Manchester United)			
Defence	(Spain) Héctor Bellerín (Arsenal)	(Belgium) Toby Alderweireld (Tottenham Hotspur)	(Jamaica) Wes Morgan (Leicester City)	(England) Danny Rose (Tottenham Hotspur)
Midfield	(Algeria) Riyad Mahrez (Leicester City)	(England) Dele Alli (Tottenham Hotspur)	(France) N'Golo Kanté (Leicester City)	(France) Dimitri Payet (West Ham United)
Attack	(England) Jamie Vardy (Leicester City)		(England) Harry Kane (Tottenham Hotspur)	

== Attendances ==
#	Football club	Home games	Average attendance
1	Manchester United	19	75,286
2	Arsenal FC	19	59,944
3	Manchester City	19	54,041
4	Newcastle United	19	49,754
5	Liverpool FC	19	43,910
6	Sunderland AFC	19	43,071
7	Chelsea FC	19	41,500
8	Everton FC	19	38,124
9	Tottenham Hotspur	19	35,776
10	West Ham United	19	34,910
11	Aston Villa	19	33,690
12	Leicester City	19	32,021
13	Southampton FC	19	30,751
14	Stoke City	19	27,534
15	Norwich City	19	26,972
16	Crystal Palace	19	24,636
17	West Bromwich Albion	19	24,631
18	Swansea City	19	20,711
19	Watford FC	19	20,594
20	AFC Bournemouth	19	11,189
