= Tlcbet =

Online gambling company based in the Philippines

TLCBET
- Company type: Private Limited
- Website type: Online gambling
- Available in: Multilingual
- Founded: 2010
- Area served: International
- Industry: Gambling
- Products: Sports betting, Online casino, Online Slot Game, Keno
- Website: www.tlcbet.co.uk

TLCBET [tóng.lè.chéng] (formerly known as TLC88 and TLC188) is a Philippines-based online gambling company founded in 2010. TLCBET offers up to 4,000 in-running games every month.

== Licensing ==
TLCBET's gaming license is from FCLRC (First Cagayan Leisure and Resort Corporation). The products and services in TLCBET are licensed and regulated by the Master Licensor and Regulator of the Cagayan Special Economic Zone and the Free-port (CSEZFP) interactive gaming jurisdiction.

== Sponsorships ==
TLCBET has sponsored football clubs in the English Premier League such as Sunderland A.F.C, West Bromwich Albion F.C., Southampton F.C., Middlesbrough F.C. .

Sunderland A.F.C.

Sunderland A.F.C. signed a new sponsorship deal with TLCBET to become the club's “Official Asian Betting and Gaming Partner” on 16 October 2012. Sunderland A.F.C. announced a three-year extension with TLCBET on 5 June 2014. This deal ended 31 May 2015 with mutual contract agreement. Sunderland A.F.C. has won six top-flight titles, two FA Cup, and an FA Community Shield.

West Bromwich Albion F.C.

TLCBET signed as West Bromwich Albion F.C.'s “Platinum Gaming Partner” on 15 August 2013, which ended on 31 May 2014 with mutual contract agreement. They signed with the team once again as a principal partner for the 2015–16 Premier League season. Among West Bromwich Albion F.C.’s achievements include being champions of England once, winning five FA Cups and a Football League Cup.

Southampton F.C.

In April 2017, TLCBET signed a contract with Southampton F.C. to become the club's “Official Asia Betting Partner and Official Global Casino Partner” for the remainder of the 2016–17 season, to be followed by two whole seasons. Southampton F.C. has won an FA Cup and earned second place in the First Division in 1983–84.

Middlesbrough F.C.

TLCBET signed as the “Official Gaming Partner” of 2004 League Cup champions, Middlesbrough F.C. for the 2016–17 Premier League season.
