= David Corner (footballer) =

English footballer

Personal information
- Full name: David Edward Corner
- Date of birth: 15 May 1966 (age 60)
- Place of birth: Sunderland, England
- Height: 6 ft 2 in (1.88 m)
- Position: Central defender

Senior career*
Years	Team	Apps	(Gls)
1984–1988	Sunderland	33	(1)
1985–1986	→ Cardiff City (loan)	6	(0)
1987–1988	→ Peterborough United (loan)	9	(0)
1988–1989	Leyton Orient	4	(0)
1989–1991	Darlington	56	(9)
1991–1994	Gateshead	101	(7)
Total		209	(17)

International career
1983	England U17	4	(0)
1985	England U20	3	(0)
- * Club domestic league appearances and goals

David Edward Corner (born 15 May 1966) is an English former professional footballer who played as a central defender in the Football League for Sunderland, Cardiff City, Peterborough United, Leyton Orient and Darlington.

== Career ==
Born in Sunderland, Corner joined his hometown club Sunderland in 1984 at the age of 18. After Shaun Elliott suffered an injury during the 1984–85 season, Corner was able to establish himself in the first team and was named in the starting line-up for the 1985 Football League Cup Final against Norwich City in only his fifth appearance for the club. However, a mistake by Corner led to the only goal of the game when he was caught in possession by John Deehan, before the ball fell to Asa Hartford, whose shot deflected in off Gordon Chisholm to seal a victory for Norwich. He later played for Cardiff City, Peterborough United, Leyton Orient, Darlington, and Gateshead.

He also represented England at under-17 level and participated at the 1985 FIFA World Youth Championship.

== Honours ==
Sunderland

- Football League Cup runner-up: 1984–85

Darlington

- Football League Fourth Division: 1990–91
