= 2014–15 Football League Championship =

Football League Championship
- Season: 2014–15
- Champions: Bournemouth; 1st Championship title 1st 2nd tier title
- Promoted: Bournemouth; Watford; Norwich City
- Relegated: Millwall; Wigan Athletic; Blackpool
- Matches: 552
- Goals: 1,474 (2.67 per match)
- Top goalscorer: Daryl Murphy (Ipswich Town) (27 goals)
- Biggest home win: Derby County 5–0 Wolverhampton Wanderers (8 November 2014); Birmingham City 6–1 Reading (13 December 2014); Norwich City 5–0 Huddersfield Town (13 December 2014); Norwich City 6–1 Millwall (26 December 2014); Watford 5–0 Charlton Athletic (17 January 2015); Watford 7–2 Blackpool (24 January 2015); Wolverhampton Wanderers 5–0 Rotherham United (21 February 2015)
- Biggest away win: Birmingham City 0–8 Bournemouth (25 October 2014)
- Highest scoring: Watford 7–2 Blackpool (24 January 2015)
- Longest winning run: 6 games Bournemouth; Norwich City
- Longest unbeaten run: 14 games Bournemouth
- Longest winless run: 18 games Blackpool
- Longest losing run: 6 games Blackpool
- Highest attendance: 33,381; Middlesbrough 0–0 Brighton & Hove Albion (2 May 2015)
- Lowest attendance: 8,250; Millwall 2–2 Blackburn Rovers (4 November 2014)
- Total attendance: 9,771,471
- Average attendance: 17,863
- All statistics correct as of 2 May 2015.

The 2014–15 Football League Championship (referred to as the Sky Bet Championship for sponsorship reasons) was the eleventh season of the Football League Championship under its current title and the twenty-third season under its current league structure. The 2014–15 season began on 8 August 2014 and ended on 2 May 2015.

Bournemouth won the league on the last day of the season, confirming their place in the top flight for the first time in their history. Watford were runners-up and took their place in the Premier League for the first time since the 2006–07 season. Norwich were the final promoted team, bouncing straight back from their relegation the previous season by beating Middlesbrough 2–0 in the Play Off Final.

At the other end of the table, Blackpool were relegated in April having been cut adrift at the bottom of the table for much of the season. Wigan and Millwall were the other two teams to be relegated on the penultimate weekend of the season.

== Changes from last season ==
=== Team changes ===
The following teams have changed division since the 2013–14 season.

==== To Championship ====
Promoted from League One

- Wolverhampton Wanderers
- Brentford
- Rotherham United

Relegated from Premier League

- Norwich City
- Fulham
- Cardiff City

==== From Championship ====
Relegated to League One

- Doncaster Rovers
- Barnsley
- Yeovil Town

Promoted to Premier League

- Leicester City
- Burnley
- Queens Park Rangers

=== Rule changes ===
Changes to the Championship's financial fair play system allow clubs:

- Acceptable losses of £3 million during the 2014–15 season
- Acceptable shareholder equity investment of £3 million during the 2014–15 season (down from £5 million during the 2013–14 season).
- Sanctions for exceeding the allowances take effect from the set of accounts due to be submitted on 1 December 2014 for the 2013–14 season.

== Team overview ==
=== Stadia and locations ===
Team	Stadium	Capacity
Birmingham City	St Andrew's	30,016
Blackburn Rovers	Ewood Park	31,154
Blackpool	Bloomfield Road	17,338
Bolton Wanderers	Macron Stadium	28,100
Bournemouth	Dean Court	12,000
Brentford	Griffin Park	12,763
Brighton & Hove Albion	Falmer Stadium	30,750
Cardiff City	Cardiff City Stadium	33,316
Charlton Athletic	The Valley	27,111
Derby County	iPro Stadium	33,597
Fulham	Craven Cottage	25,700
Huddersfield Town	John Smith's Stadium	24,500
Ipswich Town	Portman Road	30,311
Leeds United	Elland Road	39,460
Middlesbrough	Riverside Stadium	34,742
Millwall	The Den	20,146
Norwich City	Carrow Road	27,244
Nottingham Forest	City Ground	30,576
Reading	Madejski Stadium	24,224
Rotherham United	New York Stadium	12,021
Sheffield Wednesday	Hillsborough	39,812
Watford	Vicarage Road	20,877
Wigan Athletic	DW Stadium	25,133
Wolverhampton Wanderers	Molineux	31,700

Locations of teams in the 2014–2015 Football League Championship
Greater London Championship football clubs

=== Personnel and sponsoring ===
Team	Manager (Note: According to current revision of List of English Football League managers)	Kit manufacturer	Shirt sponsor	Back sponsor	Shorts sponsor
Birmingham City	(England) Gary Rowett	Carbrini	Zapaygo	None	None
Blackburn Rovers	(England) Gary Bowyer	Nike	Zebra Claims Ltd.	None	None
Blackpool	(England) Lee Clark	Erreà	Wonga	None	None
Bolton Wanderers	(Northern Ireland) Neil Lennon	Macron	FibrLec/Wix.com (in FA Cup matches)	None	None
Bournemouth	(England) Eddie Howe	Carbrini	Energy Consulting	Energy Consulting	None
Brentford	(England) Mark Warburton	Adidas	Skyex	Matchbook	Matchbook
Brighton & Hove Albion	(Republic of Ireland) Chris Hughton	Nike	American Express	American Express	American Express
Cardiff City	(England) Russell Slade	Cosway Sports	Visit Malaysia	Visit Malaysia	Visit Malaysia
Charlton Athletic	(Israel) Guy Luzon	Nike	University of Greenwich	Andrews Air Conditioning	Mitsubishi Electric
Derby County	(England) Steve McClaren	Umbro	Just Eat	M&DH Insurance	M&DH Insurance
Fulham	(Wales) Kit Symons	Adidas	Marathonbet	None	None
Huddersfield Town	(England) Chris Powell	Puma	Rekorderlig Cider (H)/RadianB (A)/Cavonia (T)	Northern Commercials (H)/Rekorderlig Cider (A & T)	Stafflex
Ipswich Town	(Republic of Ireland) Mick McCarthy	Adidas	Marcus Evans	None	None
Leeds United	(England) Neil Redfearn	Macron	Enterprise Insurance	Help Link Direct	Help Link Direct
Middlesbrough	(Spain) Aitor Karanka	Adidas	Ramsdens	None	None
Millwall	(England) Neil Harris	Macron	Euro Ferries	Wallis Teagan	Southwark Metals
Norwich City	(Scotland) Alex Neil	Erreà	Aviva	None	None
Nottingham Forest	(Scotland) Dougie Freedman	Adidas	Fawaz International Refrigeration & Air Conditioning Company	ICM Capital	None
Reading	(Scotland) Steve Clarke	Puma	Waitrose	Thai	Legend Alliance Ltd
Rotherham United	(Scotland) Steve Evans	Puma	Parkgate Shopping (H)/Shedlands (A & T)	Perrys (H)/Hughie Construction (A & T)	Balreed
Sheffield Wednesday	(England) Stuart Gray	Sondico	Azerbaijan: Land of Fire	None	None
Watford	(Serbia) Slaviša Jokanović	Puma	138.com	Football Manager (H)/Football Manager Handheld (A)	None
Wigan Athletic	(Scotland) Gary Caldwell	MiFit	Intersport	Premier Range/Roofing Consultants Group	None
Wolverhampton Wanderers	(Wales) Kenny Jackett	Puma	WhatHouse?	Reconomy	None

==== Managerial changes ====
Team	Outgoing manager	Manner of departure	Date of vacancy	Position in table	Incoming manager	Date of appointment
Blackpool	(Scotland) Barry Ferguson	End of contract	9 May 2014	Pre-season	(Belgium) José Riga	11 June 2014
Brighton & Hove Albion	(Spain) Óscar García	Resigned	12 May 2014	Pre-season	(Finland) Sami Hyypiä	6 June 2014
Charlton Athletic	(Belgium) José Riga	End of contract	27 May 2014	Pre-season	(Belgium) Bob Peeters	27 May 2014
Leeds United	(England) Brian McDermott	Mutual consent	31 May 2014	Pre-season	(England) David Hockaday	19 June 2014
Huddersfield Town	(England) Mark Robins	Mutual consent	10 August 2014	24th	(England) Chris Powell	3 September 2014
Leeds United	(England) David Hockaday	Sacked	28 August 2014	21st	(Slovenia) Darko Milanič	23 September 2014
Watford	(Italy) Giuseppe Sannino	Resigned	1 September 2014	2nd	(Spain) Óscar García	2 September 2014
Cardiff City	(Norway) Ole Gunnar Solskjær	Resigned	18 September 2014	17th	(England) Russell Slade	6 October 2014
Fulham	(Germany) Felix Magath	Sacked	18 September 2014	24th	(Wales) Kit Symons	29 October 2014
Watford	(Spain) Óscar García	Resigned due to ill health	29 September 2014	4th	(Scotland) Billy McKinlay	29 September 2014
Bolton Wanderers	(Scotland) Dougie Freedman	Mutual consent	3 October 2014	23rd	(Northern Ireland) Neil Lennon	12 October 2014
Watford	(Scotland) Billy McKinlay	Mutual consent	7 October 2014	3rd	(Serbia) Slaviša Jokanović	7 October 2014
Birmingham City	(England) Lee Clark	Sacked	20 October 2014	21st	(England) Gary Rowett	27 October 2014
Leeds United	(Slovenia) Darko Milanič	Sacked	26 October 2014	18th	(England) Neil Redfearn	1 November 2014
Blackpool	(Belgium) José Riga	Sacked	27 October 2014	24th	(England) Lee Clark	30 October 2014
Wigan Athletic	(Germany) Uwe Rösler	Sacked	13 November 2014	22nd	(Scotland) Malky Mackay	19 November 2014
Reading	(England) Nigel Adkins	Sacked	15 December 2014	16th	(Scotland) Steve Clarke	16 December 2014
Brighton & Hove Albion	(Finland) Sami Hyypiä	Resigned	22 December 2014	22nd	(Republic of Ireland) Chris Hughton	31 December 2014
Norwich City	(England) Neil Adams	Resigned	5 January 2015	7th	(Scotland) Alex Neil	9 January 2015
Charlton Athletic	(Belgium) Bob Peeters	Sacked	11 January 2015	14th	(Israel) Guy Luzon	13 January 2015
Nottingham Forest	(England) Stuart Pearce	Sacked	1 February 2015	12th	(Scotland) Dougie Freedman	1 February 2015
Millwall	(England) Ian Holloway	Sacked	10 March 2015	23rd	(England) Neil Harris	29 April 2015
Wigan Athletic	(Scotland) Malky Mackay	Sacked	6 April 2015	23rd	(Scotland) Gary Caldwell	7 April 2015

== League table ==
Pos	Team	Pld	W	D	L	GF	GA	GD	Pts	Promotion, qualification or relegation
1	Bournemouth (C, P)	46	26	12	8	98	45	+53	90	Promotion to the Premier League
2	Watford (P)	46	27	8	11	91	50	+41	89	Promotion to the Premier League
3	Norwich City (O, P)	46	25	11	10	88	48	+40	86	Qualification for Championship play-offs
4	Middlesbrough	46	25	10	11	68	37	+31	85	Qualification for Championship play-offs
5	Brentford	46	23	9	14	78	59	+19	78	Qualification for Championship play-offs
6	Ipswich Town	46	22	12	12	72	54	+18	78	Qualification for Championship play-offs
7	Wolverhampton Wanderers	46	22	12	12	70	56	+14	78	
8	Derby County	46	21	14	11	85	56	+29	77	
9	Blackburn Rovers	46	17	16	13	66	59	+7	67	
10	Birmingham City	46	16	15	15	54	64	−10	63	
11	Cardiff City	46	16	14	16	57	61	−4	62	
12	Charlton Athletic	46	14	18	14	54	60	−6	60	
13	Sheffield Wednesday	46	14	18	14	43	49	−6	60	
14	Nottingham Forest	46	15	14	17	71	69	+2	59	
15	Leeds United	46	15	11	20	50	61	−11	56	
16	Huddersfield Town	46	13	16	17	58	75	−17	55	
17	Fulham	46	14	10	22	62	83	−21	52	
18	Bolton Wanderers	46	13	12	21	54	67	−13	51	
19	Reading	46	13	11	22	48	69	−21	50	
20	Brighton & Hove Albion	46	10	17	19	44	54	−10	47	
21	Rotherham United	46	11	16	19	46	67	−21	46 (Note: Rotherham United were deducted three points for fielding an ineligible player.)	
22	Millwall (R)	46	9	14	23	42	76	−34	41	Relegation to Football League One
23	Wigan Athletic (R)	46	9	12	25	39	64	−25	39	Relegation to Football League One
24	Blackpool (R)	46	4	14	28	36	91	−55	26	Relegation to Football League One

Updated to match(es) played on 2 May 2015. Source: Sky Sports
Rules for classification: 1) Points; 2) Goal difference; 3) Number of goals scored
(C) Champions; (O) Play-off winners; (P) Promoted; (R) Relegated

== Play-offs ==
Semi–Finals
3	Norwich City	1	3	4
6	Ipswich	1	1	2
4	Middlesbrough	2	3	5
5	Brentford	1	0	1

Final
3	Norwich City	2
4	Middlesbrough	0

== Results ==
Home \ Away	BIR	BLB	BLP	BOL	BOU	BRE	BHA	CAR	CHA	DER	FUL	HUD	IPS	LEE	MID	MIL	NWC	NOT	REA	ROT	SHW	WAT	WIG	WOL
Birmingham City		2–2	1–0	0–1	0–8	1–0	1–0	0–0	1–0	0–4	1–2	1–1	2–2	1–1	1–1	0–1	0–0	2–1	6–1	2–1	0–2	2–1	3–1	2–1
Blackburn Rovers	1–0		1–1	1–0	3–2	2–3	0–1	1–1	2–0	2–3	2–1	0–0	3–2	2–1	0–0	2–0	1–2	3–3	3–1	2–1	1–2	2–2	3–1	0–1
Blackpool	1–0	1–2		1–1	1–6	1–2	1–0	1–0	0–3	0–1	0–1	0–0 (Note: Blackpool/Huddersfield match was abandoned, and was subsequently awarded as a 0-0 draw.)	0–2	1–1	1–2	1–0	1–3	4–4	1–1	1–1	0–1	0–1	1–3	0–0
Bolton Wanderers	0–1	2–1	1–1		1–2	3–1	1–0	3–0	1–1	0–2	3–1	1–0	0–0	1–1	1–2	2–0	1–2	2–2	1–1	3–2	0–0	3–4	3–1	2–2
Bournemouth	4–2	0–0	4–0	3–0		1–0	3–2	5–3	1–0	2–2	2–0	1–1	2–2	1–3	3–0	2–2	1–2	1–2	3–0	1–1	2–2	2–0	2–0	2–1
Brentford	1–1	3–1	4–0	2–2	3–1		3–2	1–2	1–1	2–1	2–1	4–1	2–4	2–0	0–1	2–2	0–3	2–2	3–1	1–0	0–0	1–2	3–0	4–0
Brighton & Hove Albion	4–3	1–1	0–0	2–1	0–2	0–1		1–1	2–2	2–0	1–2	0–0	3–2	2–0	1–2	0–1	0–1	2–3	2–2	1–1	0–1	0–2	1–0	1–1
Cardiff City	2–0	1–1	3–2	0–3	1–1	2–3	0–0		1–2	0–2	1–0	3–1	3–1	3–1	0–1	0–0	2–4	2–1	2–1	0–0	2–1	2–4	1–0	0–1
Charlton Athletic	1–1	1–3	2–2	2–1	0–3	3–0	0–1	1–1		3–2	1–1	3–0	0–1	2–1	0–0	0–0	2–3	2–1	3–2	1–1	1–1	1–0	2–1	1–1
Derby County	2–2	2–0	4–0	4–1	2–0	1–1	3–0	2–2	2–0		5–1	3–2	1–1	2–0	0–1	0–0	2–2	1–2	0–3	1–0	3–2	2–2	1–2	5–0
Fulham	1–1	0–1	2–2	4–0	1–5	1–4	0–2	1–1	3–0	2–0		3–1	1–2	0–3	4–3	0–1	1–0	3–2	2–1	1–1	4–0	0–5	2–2	0–1
Huddersfield Town	0–1	2–2	4–2	2–1	0–4	2–1	1–1	0–0	1–1	4–4	0–2		2–1	1–2	1–2	2–1	2–2	3–0	3–0	0–2	0–0	3–1	0–0	1–4
Ipswich Town	4–2	1–1	3–2	1–0	1–1	1–1	2–0	3–1	3–0	0–1	2–1	2–2		4–1	2–0	2–0	0–1	2–1	0–1	2–0	2–1	1–0	0–0	2–1
Leeds United	1–1	0–3	3–1	1–0	1–0	0–1	0–2	1–2	2–2	2–0	0–1	3–0	2–1		1–0	1–0	0–2	0–0	0–0	0–0	1–1	2–3	0–2	1–2
Middlesbrough	2–0	1–1	1–1	1–0	0–0	4–0	0–0	2–1	3–1	2–0	2–0	2–0	4–1	0–1		3–0	4–0	3–0	0–1	2–0	2–3	1–1	1–0	2–1
Millwall	1–3	2–2	2–1	0–1	0–2	2–3	0–0	1–0	2–1	3–3	0–0	1–3	1–3	2–0	1–5		1–4	0–0	0–0	0–1	1–3	0–2	2–0	3–3
Norwich City	2–2	3–1	4–0	2–1	1–1	1–2	3–3	3–2	0–1	1–1	4–2	5–0	2–0	1–1	0–1	6–1		3–1	1–2	1–1	2–0	3–0	0–1	2–0
Nottingham Forest	1–3	1–3	2–0	4–1	2–1	1–3	0–0	1–2	1–1	1–1	5–3	0–1	2–2	1–1	2–1	0–1	2–1		4–0	2–0	0–2	1–3	3–0	1–2
Reading	0–1	0–0	3–0	0–0	0–1	0–2	2–1	1–1	0–1	0–3	3–0	1–2	1–0	0–2	0–0	3–2	2–1	0–3		3–0	2–0	0–1	0–1	3–3
Rotherham United	0–1	2–0	1–1	4–2	0–2	0–2	1–0	1–3	1–1	3–3	3–3	2–2	2–0	2–1	0–3	2–1	1–1	0–0	2–1		2–3	0–2	1–2	1–0
Sheffield Wednesday	0–0	1–2	1–0	1–2	0–2	1–0	0–0	1–1	1–1	0–0	1–1	1–1	1–1	1–2	2–0	1–1	0–0	0–1	1–0	0–0		0–3	2–1	0–1
Watford	1–0	1–0	7–2	3–0	1–1	2–1	1–1	0–1	5–0	1–2	1–0	4–2	0–1	4–1	2–0	3–1	0–3	2–2	4–1	3–0	1–1		2–1	0–1
Wigan Athletic	4–0	1–1	1–0	1–1	1–3	0–0	2–1	0–1	0–3	0–2	3–3	0–1	1–2	0–1	1–1	0–0	0–1	0–0	2–2	1–2	0–1	0–2		0–1
Wolverhampton Wanderers	0–0	3–1	2–0	1–0	1–2	2–1	1–1	1–0	0–0	2–0	3–0	1–3	1–1	4–3	2–0	4–2	1–0	0–3	1–2	5–0	3–0	2–2	2–2	

Updated to match(es) played on 2 May 2015. Source: BBC Sport
Legend: Blue = home team win; Yellow = draw; Red = away team win.

== Top scorers ==
As of 2 May 2015

Rank	Player	Club	Goals
1	(Republic of Ireland) Daryl Murphy	Ipswich Town	27
2	(England) Troy Deeney	Watford	21
2	(Scotland) Jordan Rhodes	Blackburn Rovers	21
4	(Benin) Rudy Gestede	Blackburn Rovers	20
4	(Nigeria) Odion Ighalo	Watford	20
4	(England) Callum Wilson	Bournemouth	20
7	(England) Cameron Jerome	Norwich City	18
7	(Scotland) Chris Martin	Derby County	18
9	(England) Patrick Bamford	Middlesbrough	17
9	(Scotland) Ross McCormack	Fulham	17

== Hat-tricks ==
Player	For	Against	Result	Date
(Republic of Ireland) Joe Mason	Bolton Wanderers	Rotherham United	3–2	16 September 2014
(Democratic Republic of the Congo) Britt Assombalonga	Nottingham Forest	Fulham	5–3	17 September 2014
(England) Marc Pugh	Bournemouth	Birmingham City	8–0	25 October 2014
(England) Troy Deeney	Watford	Fulham	5–0	5 December 2014
(Belgium) Jelle Vossen	Middlesbrough	Millwall	5–1	6 December 2014
(England) Demarai Gray	Birmingham City	Reading	6–1	13 December 2014
(England) Clayton Donaldson	Birmingham City	Wigan Athletic	3–1	10 January 2015
(Scotland) Ross McCormack	Fulham	Nottingham Forest	3–2	21 January 2015
(Nigeria) Odion Ighalo^{4}	Watford	Blackpool	7–2	24 January 2015
(England) Gary Hooper	Norwich City	Blackpool	4–0	7 February 2015
(Spain) Jon Toral	Brentford	Blackpool	4–0	24 February 2015
(England) Brett Pitman	Bournemouth	Blackpool	4–0	14 March 2015
(Benin) Rudy Gestede	Blackburn Rovers	Nottingham Forest	3–3	18 April 2015
(England) Lee Gregory	Millwall	Derby County	3–3	25 April 2015
(Scotland) Ross McCormack	Fulham	Middlesbrough	4–3	25 April 2015

^{4} Player scored 4 goals

== Monthly awards ==
Month	Manager of the Month		Player of the Month		Ref.
Month	Manager	Club	Player	Club	Ref.
August	(Wales) Kenny Jackett	Wolverhampton Wanderers	(Angola) Igor Vetokele	Charlton Athletic	
September	(Republic of Ireland) Mick McCarthy	Ipswich Town	(England) Tyrone Mings	Ipswich Town	
October	(England) Eddie Howe	Bournemouth	(England) Callum Wilson	Bournemouth	
November	(England) Mark Warburton	Brentford	(Jamaica) Andre Gray	Brentford	
December	(England) Eddie Howe	Bournemouth	(Republic of Ireland) Daryl Murphy	Ipswich Town	
January	(Spain) Aitor Karanka	Middlesbrough	(England) Lee Tomlin	Middlesbrough	
February	(Scotland) Alex Neil	Norwich City	(England) Henri Lansbury	Nottingham Forest	
March	(England) Eddie Howe	Bournemouth	(England) Troy Deeney	Watford	
April	(Serbia) Slaviša Jokanović	Watford	(England) Tom Ince	Derby County	

== Attendances ==
No.	Club	Average	Change	Highest	Lowest
1	Derby County	29,232	17.2%	32,705	26,373
2	Norwich City	26,343	-1.7%	27,005	25,595
3	Brighton & Hove Albion	25,645	-6.0%	28,890	23,044
4	Leeds United	24,052	-4.1%	31,850	17,634
5	Nottingham Forest	23,492	3.8%	30,227	19,619
6	Wolverhampton Wanderers	22,419	7.4%	28,132	17,744
7	Sheffield Wednesday	21,993	3.6%	29,848	16,881
8	Cardiff City	21,124	-23.0%	26,357	19,057
9	Ipswich Town	19,603	14.6%	26,157	15,726
10	Middlesbrough	19,562	24.2%	33,381	14,970
11	Fulham	18,276	-26.8%	23,271	14,325
12	Reading	17,022	-11.2%	20,048	13,775
13	Charlton Athletic	16,708	3.6%	25,545	13,433
14	Watford	16,664	7.4%	20,250	13,468
15	Birmingham City	16,111	4.2%	23,851	13,837
16	Bolton Wanderers	15,413	-4.5%	23,203	12,790
17	Blackburn Rovers	14,913	-0.3%	22,340	12,852
18	Huddersfield Town	13,613	-4.2%	20,029	10,282
19	Wigan Athletic	12,882	-15.1%	16,810	10,016
20	Blackpool	10,984	-22.7%	12,233	9,168
21	Millwall	10,902	-1.5%	16,205	8,250
22	Brentford	10,822	40.3%	12,255	8,765
23	AFC Bournemouth	10,265	3.1%	11,318	8,480
24	Rotherham United	10,240	21.2%	11,707	8,534
