= Friendship Trophy =

Friendly football match between Norwich City F.C and Sunderland A.F.C

- Location: Norwich and Sunderland
- Teams: Norwich City; Sunderland
- First meeting: 24 March 1985
- Latest meeting: Norwich City 0-0 Sunderland; 2024–25 EFL Championship (8 April 2025)
- Next meeting: Norwich City vs Sunderland (TBA)
- Trophy: Current holders: Sunderland

Statistics
- Total meetings: 33
- Most wins: Norwich City (15)
- All-time series: Norwich City: 6 Drawn: 2 (Sunderland retained); Sunderland: 6 (including 2 solo cup wins)

The Friendship Trophy is a football match, contested on an irregular basis by just two teams: Norwich City and Sunderland. The match dates back to the camaraderie forged between fans of the two clubs at the time of the 1985 Football League Cup Final that they contested. Norwich City won the 1985 Football League Cup Final, however at the end of the First Division Season, both teams were relegated to the Second Division.

Mackem and Canary mingled and drank happily together. “The Sunderland supporters were magnificent and everyone seemed to mix, it was light-hearted and very nice,” judged Norwich manager Ken Brown after his team had lifted the trophy thanks to a Gordon Chisholm own goal. On the London Underground, Norwich fans sang “we won the cup”, while Sunderland’s retorted with: “we scored the goal”.

Nowadays, the Friendship Trophy is awarded to the team with the winning aggregate score in competitive matches over the season between the two sides.

The trophy was most recently contested in April 2025, when the teams played at Carrow Road in the EFL Championship. The match was a 0-0 draw, with Sunderland having won 2-1 at the Stadium of Light in December 2024.

This trophy is only infrequently contested, as it requires both Norwich City and Sunderland to be in the same division, or to be drawn together in a cup competition, which last happened in 2009, when Sunderland beat Norwich City 4–1 in the Football League Cup. The most significant cup meeting after the 1985 final was the semi-final of the 1991–92 FA Cup at Hillsborough, which Sunderland won 1–0.

== Head to head summary ==
Club	P	W	D	L	F	A	+/-
League
Norwich City	30	14	7	9	32	29	+3
Sunderland	30	9	6	15	29	32	–3
FA Cup
Norwich City	1	0	0	1	0	1	–1
Sunderland	1	1	0	0	1	0	+1
Football League Cup
Norwich City	2	1	0	1	2	4	–2
Sunderland	2	1	0	1	4	2	+2
Totals
Norwich City	33	16	6	11	34	34	+0
Sunderland	33	11	6	16	34	34	+0

== Head-to-head fixtures ==
Date	Home team	Score	Away team	Competition
24 March 1985	Norwich City	1–0	Sunderland	Football League Cup
26 October 1985	Sunderland	0–2	Norwich City	Football League, Second Division
9 April 1986	Norwich City	0–0	Sunderland	Football League, Second Division
25 August 1990	Norwich City	3–2	Sunderland	Football League, First Division
15 December 1990	Sunderland	1–2	Norwich City	Football League, First Division
5 April 1992	Sunderland	1–0	Norwich City	FA Cup
19 August 1995	Norwich City	0–0	Sunderland	Football League First Division
14 January 1996	Sunderland	0–1	Norwich City	Football League First Division
30 August 1997	Sunderland	0–1	Norwich City	Football League First Division
28 January 1998	Norwich City	2–1	Sunderland	Football League First Division
29 September 1998	Norwich City	2–2	Sunderland	Football League First Division
6 March 1999	Sunderland	1–0	Norwich City	Football League First Division
25 October 2003	Norwich City	1–0	Sunderland	Football League First Division
4 May 2004	Sunderland	1–0	Norwich City	Football League First Division
4 November 2006	Norwich City	1–0	Sunderland	Football League Championship
2 December 2006	Sunderland	1–0	Norwich City	Football League Championship
24 August 2009	Norwich City	1–4	Sunderland	Football League Cup
26 September 2011	Norwich City	2–1	Sunderland	Premier League
1 February 2012	Sunderland	3–0	Norwich City	Premier League
2 December 2012	Norwich City	2–1	Sunderland	Premier League
17 March 2013	Sunderland	1–1	Norwich City	Premier League
21 December 2013	Sunderland	0–0	Norwich City	Premier League
22 March 2014	Norwich City	2–0	Sunderland	Premier League
15 August 2015	Sunderland	1–3	Norwich City	Premier League
16 April 2016	Norwich City	0–3	Sunderland	Premier League
13 August 2017	Norwich City	1–3	Sunderland	EFL Championship
10 April 2018	Sunderland	1–1	Norwich City	EFL Championship
27 August 2022	Sunderland	0–1	Norwich City	EFL Championship
12 March 2023	Norwich City	0–1	Sunderland	EFL Championship
28 October 2023	Sunderland	3–1	Norwich City	EFL Championship
2 March 2024	Norwich City	1–0	Sunderland	EFL Championship
21 December 2024	Sunderland	2–1	Norwich City	EFL Championship
8 April 2025	Norwich City	0–0	Sunderland	EFL Championship
