= Arthur Turner (Norwich City football manager) =

English football manager

Arthur Turner was a manager of English football club Norwich City.

Turner was City's third manager, and was in charge for 86 matches between 1909 and 1910, winning 27, losing 37 and drawing 22 games.
