= Alex Neil (footballer) =

Scottish football manager & player

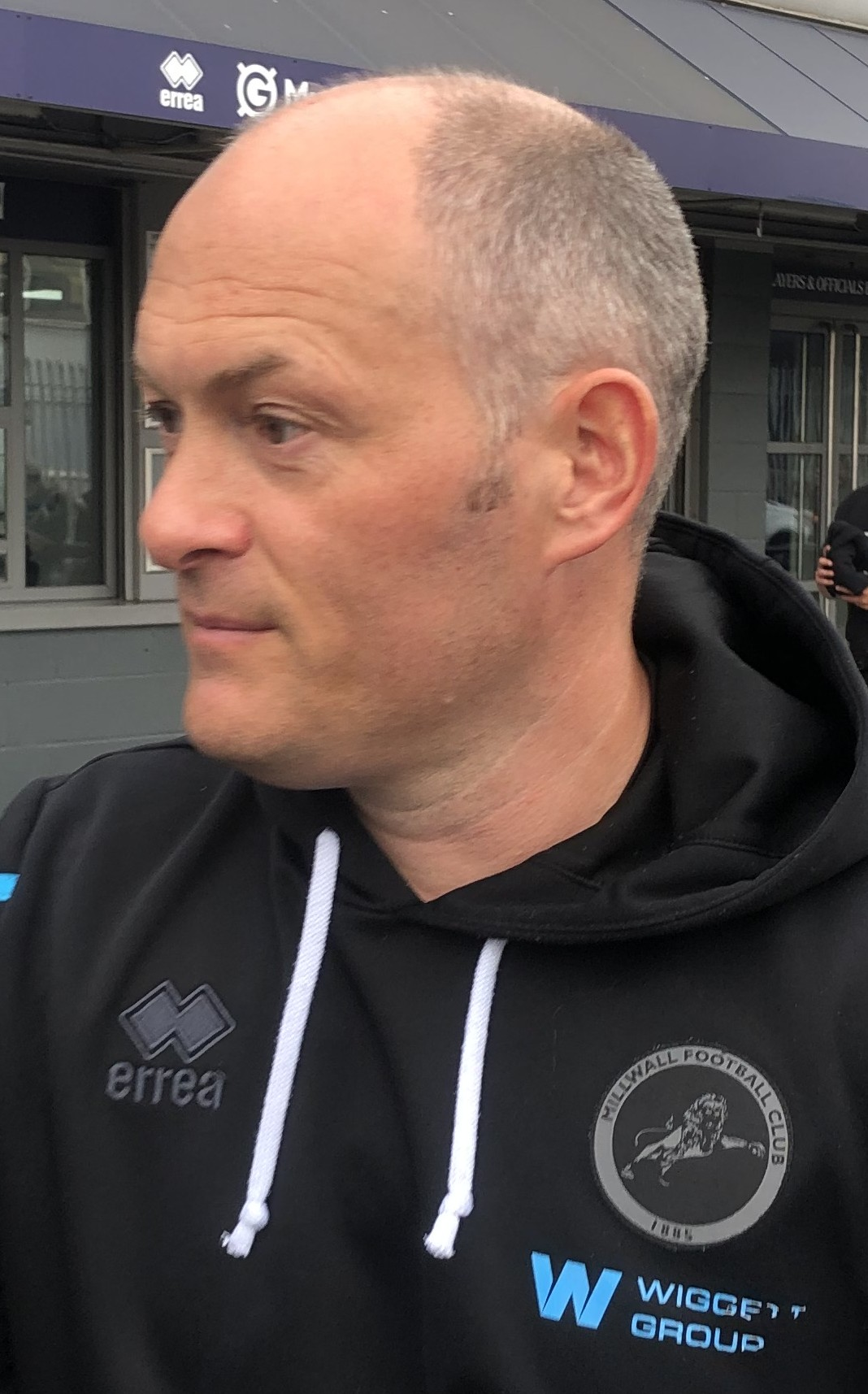
- Neil in 2025 as manager of Millwall

Personal information
- Full name: Alexander Francis Neil
- Date of birth: 9 June 1981 (age 45)
- Place of birth: Airdrie, Scotland
- Position: Defensive midfielder

Team information
- Current team: Millwall (head coach)

Youth career
- –1999: Dunfermline Athletic

Senior career*
Years	Team	Apps	(Gls)
1999–2000	Airdrieonians	16	(5)
2000–2004	Barnsley	121	(6)
2004–2005	Mansfield Town	41	(1)
2005–2015	Hamilton Academical	211	(4)
Total		389	(14)

Managerial career
- 2013–2015: Hamilton Academical
- 2015–2017: Norwich City
- 2017–2021: Preston North End
- 2022: Sunderland
- 2022–2023: Stoke City
- 2024–: Millwall
- * Club domestic league appearances and goals

Alexander Francis Neil (born 9 June 1981) is a Scottish professional football manager and former player who played as a midfielder. He is currently head coach of EFL Championship club Millwall.

Neil began his professional career at Airdrieonians in 2000, playing half a season in the Scottish Football League First Division before moving to Barnsley. He played 142 games across all competitions in his four-year spell at Barnsley, and then signed for Mansfield Town on a free transfer. After a season at Mansfield, he returned to Scotland's First Division with Hamilton Academical, featuring in 246 matches across a decade and winning promotion to the Scottish Premier League in 2008.

He became Hamilton's player-manager in 2013 and led them to promotion to the Scottish Premiership in 2014. In January 2015 he was appointed manager of Norwich City, as the second youngest manager in the Football League at the time. Neil guided Norwich to promotion to the Premier League, by winning the 2015 Football League Championship play-off final. Norwich suffered relegation the following season, and in March 2017, Neil was sacked. He was appointed Preston North End's manager on 4 July 2017 and led the team to seventh place in the 2017–18 Championship. On 11 February 2022 Neil was appointed manager of Sunderland. They were promoted from League One to the Championship, winning 2–0 in the play-off final. He left later that year to become the manager of Stoke City.

== Playing career ==
=== Airdrieonians ===
Born in Airdrie, North Lanarkshire, Neil began his career at Dunfermline Athletic, before joining Airdrieonians on a free transfer in the summer of 1999. He made his professional debut in the Scottish Football League First Division on 3 January 2000, as a 64th-minute substitute for Steve McCormick in a 2–0 home loss to Falkirk. Five days later, on his first start, he scored in the eighth minute of a 3–1 loss at St Mirren. He finished his first season with 5 goals from 16 appearances, with the other four scored in three consecutive games in April, including two in a 3–0 home win over Greenock Morton on the 8th.

=== Barnsley ===
After his first professional season, Neil was recommended to Barnsley by his next-door neighbour Peter Hetherston, a friend of their manager Dave Bassett. He made his debut for the Tykes in the Football League First Division on 26 August 2000, replacing Lee Jones for the final ten minutes of a 4–1 home win over West Bromwich Albion. He made 32 league appearances in his first season at Oakwell, and was sent off on 28 April 2001 in a 1–0 home loss to Bolton Wanderers.

On 15 September 2001, Neil scored his first goal in English football, concluding a 2–0 home win over Crewe Alexandra. He netted again on 8 November in a 2–2 draw at Preston North End, in a campaign which ended in relegation. Neil spent the following two seasons in the Second Division, scoring the decisive goals in 3–2 wins at Rushden & Diamonds and Stockport County on 10 April and 8 May 2004.

=== Mansfield Town ===
On 20 July 2004, Neil joined Mansfield Town on a free transfer. He made 41 appearances for them in League Two that season, and scored his first goal on 23 November in the first round of the FA Cup, a consolation in a 4–1 loss to Colchester United at Layer Road. His only league goal for the Stags came on 5 March 2005, opening a 1–1 draw against Shrewsbury Town at Field Mill.

=== Hamilton Academical ===
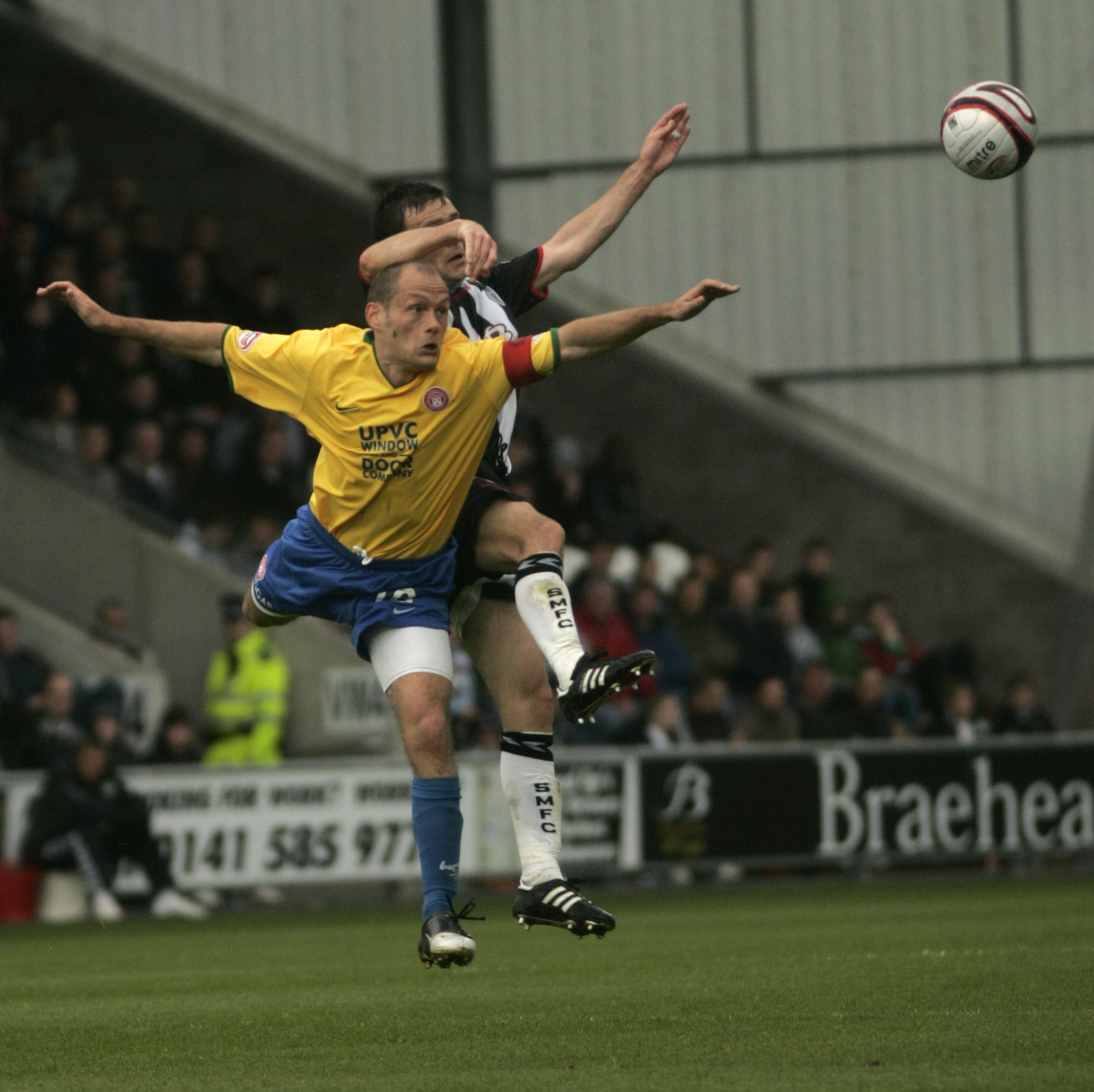
Neil (in yellow) playing for Hamilton Academical in 2009.

On 28 May 2005, having been told that he was surplus to the requirements of Mansfield manager Carlton Palmer, Neil returned to the Scottish First Division, signing a two-year deal at Hamilton Academical. He made his Accies debut on 13 August, as they began the season with a 0–1 loss to St Johnstone at New Douglas Park. Seventeen days later, he scored his first goal for his new team in the second round of the Scottish Challenge Cup, netting the only goal away to Ross County when he headed in Brian Carrigan's cross just before half time. On 22 October, he got his first league goal for them, in the first minute of the second half of a 3–0 home win against Brechin City. Neil played the entirety of the 2005 Scottish Challenge Cup Final on 6 November, a 2–1 loss to St Mirren at the Excelsior Stadium in Airdrie. The Accies also reached the quarter-finals of the Scottish Cup, with Neil scoring a penalty kick in the fourth round replay at Alloa Athletic, a 3–0 win.

Neil played 30 league games in 2007–08, as Hamilton won the division and promotion to the Scottish Premier League. He scored once that season, opening a 4–0 home win over Stirling Albion on 15 September 2007 with a 40-yard free kick.

On 6 May 2011, Neil signed a new three-year contract.

== Managerial career ==
=== Hamilton Academical ===
After manager Billy Reid vacated his managerial position at Hamilton in April 2013, Neil (who had already been involved in coaching the club's youth teams) was appointed player-manager on an interim basis. He was made manager on a permanent basis on 24 May 2013, at the age of 31. Assisted by Frankie McAvoy, Neil led the club to promotion back to the top flight in his first full season, winning through the play-off system in May 2014. Hamilton then enjoyed a good start to the 2014–15 Scottish Premiership, defeating Celtic away for the first time in 76 years.

=== Norwich City ===
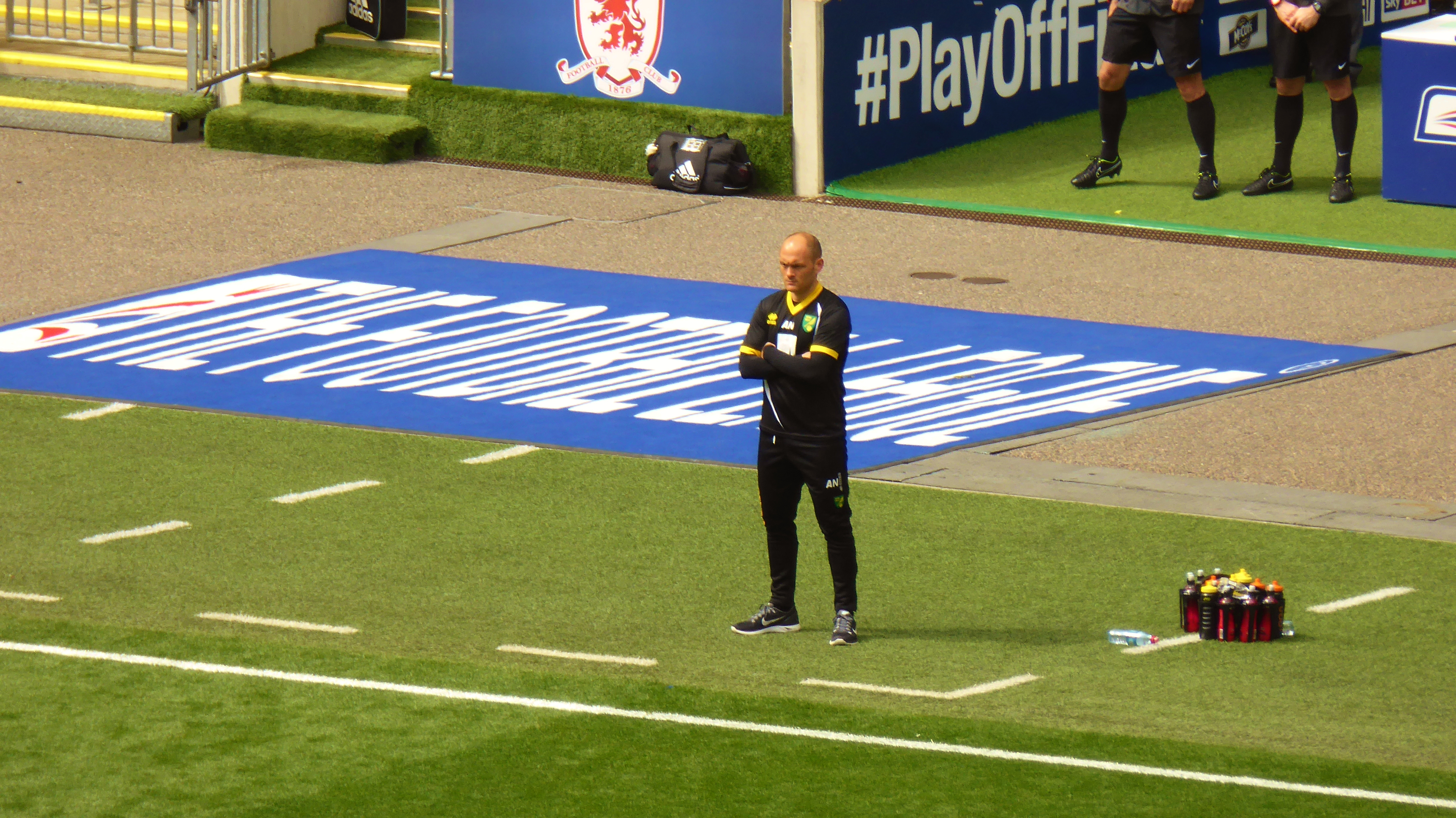
Neil at the 2015 Championship play-off final

In January 2015, Neil obtained permission from Hamilton to speak to Norwich City about their managerial vacancy. On 9 January, he was confirmed as their new manager at 33 years old, the second youngest in the Football League after Mansfield's Adam Murray. The following day in his first game, he managed his team to a 2–1 victory at Championship leaders AFC Bournemouth. Norwich gained 17 wins from 25 games played under Neil in the 2014–15 season. They finished third in the Championship and entered the play-offs, where in the semi-finals they beat East Anglia derby rivals Ipswich Town 4–2 on aggregate over two legs. On 25 May, Neil led Norwich to a 2–0 victory over Middlesbrough in the 2015 Football League Championship play-off final, as goalscorers Cameron Jerome and Nathan Redmond secured promotion to the 2015–16 Premier League. During the 2015 close season, Neil signed a new contract with Norwich City.

Norwich were relegated after a single season in the Premier League. Neil had his contract terminated in March 2017, with the Canaries 8th in the Championship table. They had won seven of their last 24 games in The Championship and were nine points outside the top six play-off places. Neil admitted to regret over summer recruitment, which led to his sacking in March.

=== Preston North End ===
On 4 July 2017, Neil was appointed as manager of Championship club Preston North End, replacing Simon Grayson, who left the club to take over as manager of Sunderland.

On 21 March 2021, Neil left Preston North End by mutual consent with the club 16th in the Championship table.

=== Sunderland ===
On 11 February 2022, Neil was appointed as the new manager of Sunderland, on a 12-month rolling contract. On 21 May 2022, Neil guided Sunderland to promotion back to the Championship after a four-year absence after they beat Wycombe Wanderers 2–0 in front of almost 50,000 Sunderland fans at Wembley in the 2022 EFL League One play-off final.

=== Stoke City ===
On 28 August 2022, Neil was appointed as the new manager of Stoke City, after the dismissal of Michael O'Neill. His first game in charge ended in a 1–1 draw against Swansea City. Stoke ended the 2022–23 season in 16th place. On 10 December 2023, Neil was sacked following a 1–0 loss to Sheffield Wednesday. Stoke were 20th in the table at the time of his departure.

=== Millwall ===
On 30 December 2024, Neil was appointed head coach of Championship side Millwall on a long-term contract. He lost his first game in charge as Millwall were defeated 1–0 by Oxford United. In May 2025, he signed a new contract with the club.

== Career statistics ==
=== Player ===
Appearances and goals by club, season and competition
Club	Season	League			National Cup		League Cup		Other		Total	
Club	Season	Division	Apps	Goals	Apps	Goals	Apps	Goals	Apps	Goals	Apps	Goals
Airdrieonians	1999–2000	Scottish First Division	16	5	0	0	0	0	—		16	5
Barnsley	2000–01	First Division	32	0	1	0	1	0	—		34	0
Barnsley	2001–02	First Division	25	2	1	0	3	0	—		29	2
Barnsley	2002–03	Second Division	33	0	1	0	0	0	1 (Note: Appearances in Football League Trophy)	0	35	0
Barnsley	2003–04	Second Division	31	2	3	0	0	0	0	0	33	2
Barnsley	Total		121	4	6	0	4	0	1	0	132	4
Mansfield Town	2004–05	League Two	41	1	1	1	1	0	0	0	43	2
Hamilton Academical	2005–06	Scottish First Division	33	2	6	1	1	0	4 (Note: Appearances in Scottish Challenge Cup)	1	44	4
Hamilton Academical	2006–07	Scottish First Division	28	0	1	0	0	0	0	0	29	0
Hamilton Academical	2007–08	Scottish First Division	30	1	2	0	3	0	0	0	35	1
Hamilton Academical	2008–09	Scottish Premier League	33	0	2	0	2	0	0	0	37	0
Hamilton Academical	2009–10	Scottish Premier League	22	0	2	0	0	0	0	0	24	0
Hamilton Academical	2010–11	Scottish Premier League	10	0	0	0	0	0	0	0	10	0
Hamilton Academical	2011–12	Scottish First Division	17	0	0	0	0	0	1	0	18	0
Hamilton Academical	2012–13	Scottish First Division	21	1	3	0	3	0	0	0	27	1
Hamilton Academical	2013–14	Scottish Championship	10	0	0	0	3	0	1 (Note: Appearance in Scottish Championship play-offs)	0	14	0
Hamilton Academical	2014–15	Scottish Premiership	7	0	0	0	1	0	0	0	8	0
Hamilton Academical	Total		211	4	16	1	13	0	6	1	246	6
Career total			389	14	23	2	18	0	7	1	437	17

== Managerial statistics ==
As of match played 21 November 2026

Managerial record by team and tenure
Team	From	To	Record					Ref.
Team	From	To	P	W	D	L	Win %	Ref.
Hamilton Academical	3 April 2013	9 January 2015	77	42	16	19	54.5	
Norwich City	9 January 2015	10 March 2017	108	45	23	40	41.7	
Preston North End	4 July 2017	21 March 2021	191	72	48	71	37.7	
Sunderland	11 February 2022	28 August 2022	24	12	9	3	50.0	
Stoke City	28 August 2022	10 December 2023	66	22	13	31	33.3	
Millwall	30 December 2024	Present	97	45	21	31	46.4	
Total			562	237	130	195	42.2	

== Honours ==
=== Player ===
Hamilton Academical

- Scottish Football League First Division: 2007–08

=== Manager ===
Hamilton Academical

- Scottish Premiership play-offs: 2014

Norwich City

- Football League Championship play-offs: 2015

Sunderland

- EFL League One play-offs: 2022

Individual

- EFL Championship Manager of the Month: September 2016
