= 1985 Football League Cup final =

- Event: 1984–85 Football League Cup
Norwich City	Sunderland
1	0
- Date: 24 March 1985
- Venue: Wembley Stadium, London
- Referee: Neil Midgley (Manchester)
- Attendance: 100,000

The 1985 Football League Cup final was won by Norwich City. The Canaries defeated Sunderland 1–0 at Wembley Stadium on 24 March 1985 with an own goal scored by Gordon Chisholm, who deflected Asa Hartford's shot past goalkeeper Chris Turner. Later in the second half, Clive Walker missed a penalty awarded for a handball by Norwich defender Dennis van Wijk.

Looking back on the final, Norwich striker Mick Channon described the final as a "lovely day", and praised his teammates' skill, saying, "we had some tremendous players like Steve Bruce and Dave Watson in the middle of the defence, Asa Hartford in midfield and John Deehan up front with me." In the lead-up to Norwich's goal Sunderland defender David Corner was attempting to usher the ball out of play for a Sunderland goal kick. However, Norwich kept the ball in play and promptly scored. In November 2011 Corner looked back on the incident stating "I should have kicked the ball out" and that he doesn't "think there's a day goes by where that game isn't mentioned". He then went on to say "It was a great honour for me to be playing for my hometown club in a national final, but I have to hold my hands up and say the goal was my fault." Norwich's victory was celebrated with an open-top bus parade.

Despite Norwich and Sunderland appearing in the final, they were both relegated to the Second Division at the end of the 1984–85 season.

As a result of the good faith shared between Norwich and Sunderland supporters during the final, the Friendship Trophy is contested every time the two clubs meet.

== Match details ==
24 March 1985

Norwich City	1–0	Sunderland
Chisholm 46' (o.g.)	Report (page 22)

Wembley Stadium, London
Attendance: 100,000
Referee: Neil Midgley (Manchester)

Norwich City	Sunderland

GK	1	(England) Chris Woods
RB	2	(England) Paul Haylock
LB	3	(Netherlands) Dennis van Wijk
CB	4	(England) Steve Bruce
CM	5	(England) Peter Mendham
CB	6	(England) Dave Watson (c)
LW	7	(England) Mark Barham
FW	8	(England) Mick Channon
FW	9	(England) John Deehan
CM	10	(Scotland) Asa Hartford
RW	11	(England) Louie Donowa
Substitute:
DF	12	(Republic of Ireland) John Devine
Manager:
(England) Ken Brown

GK	1	(England) Chris Turner
RB	2	(England) Barry Venison (c)
LB	3	(England) Nick Pickering
DF	4	(England) Gary Bennett
DF	5	(Scotland) Gordon Chisholm
DF	6	(England) David Corner	Substituted off
MF	7	(England) Peter Daniel
FW	8	(Scotland) Ian Wallace
FW	9	(England) David Hodgson
MF	10	(England) Steve Berry
LW	11	(England) Clive Walker
Substitute:
RW	12	(England) Howard Gayle	Substituted on
Manager:
(England) Len Ashurst

Match rules

- 90 minutes.
- 30 minutes of extra-time if necessary.
- Replay if scores still level.
- One named substitute.
- Maximum of one substitution.

== Route to the final ==
Norwich City
Round	Opposition	Score
2nd	Preston North End (a)	3–3
2nd	Preston North End (h)	6–1
2nd	Aggregate score 9–4	
3rd	Aldershot (h)	0–0
replay	Aldershot (a)	4–0
4th	Notts County (h)	3–0
5th	Grimsby Town (a)	1–0
Semi-final	Ipswich Town (a)	0–1
Semi-final	Ipswich Town (h)	2–0
Semi-final	Aggregate score 2–1	

Sunderland
Round	Opposition	Score
2nd	Crystal Palace (h)	2–1
2nd	Crystal Palace (a)	0–0
2nd	Aggregate score 2–1	
3rd	Nottingham Forest (a)	1–1
replay	Nottingham Forest (h)	1–0
4th	Tottenham Hotspur (h)	0–0
replay	Tottenham Hotspur (a)	2–1
5th	Watford (a)	1–0
Semi-final	Chelsea (h)	2–0
Semi-final	Chelsea (a)	3–2
Semi-final	Aggregate score 5–2	

Norwich and Sunderland were both playing in the First Division and both entered the competition at the second round stage, under the tournament format in place at the time which saw First Division teams enter in this round. Norwich had reached the Football League Cup final on three occasions, winning one of them. Sunderland had never reached a final – the closest they came was the 1962–63 edition where they were semi-finalists. Norwich faced Preston North End in their second round tie, and played out a 3–3 stalemate in the first leg. In the second leg they defeated Preston 6–1, a 9–4 victory on aggregate. Having drawn the third-round game against Aldershot 0–0, Norwich beat Aldershot in the replay 4–0 to progress to the next round. A tie against Second Division side Notts County awaited Norwich in the fourth round, which they won 3–0. They dispatched Grimsby Town 1–0 in the fifth round to set up an all East Anglian semi-final with Ipswich Town. Ipswich had beaten Norwich 1–0 in the first leg, but Norwich prevailed by winning 2–0 in the second leg, and 2–1 on aggregate.

North East Sunderland began the tournament against Crystal Palace, winning it 2–1 on aggregate, which was the same score as the first leg. Next Sunderland beat Nottingham Forest 1–0 in the third round replay, having drawn 1–1 in the original match. The fourth round went similarly the third, Sunderland played out a 0–0 draw at Roker Park forcing the game into a replay. Goals from Gordon Chisholm and Clive Walker in the replay ensured that Sunderland would progress in the fifth round. Sunderland beat Watford in the fifth round to seal a tie against Chelsea in the semi-finals. Sunderland beat Chelsea 5–2 on aggregate and secured their first ever League Cup final spot.
