= List of Norwich City F.C. players =

Below is a list of footballers who have played for Norwich City in 100 or more first-team matches.

== Key ==
- The list is ordered first by date of debut, and then alphabetically by surname.
- Appearances as a substitute are included.
- Statistics are correct as of the match played on 2 May 2026. Where a player left the club permanently after this date, his statistics are updated to his date of leaving.

Player

- Players whose names are **in bold** have been inducted into the Norwich City F.C. Hall of Fame.

Positions key
Pre-1960s		1960s–	
GK	Goalkeeper		
FB	Full-back	DF	Defender
RB	Right-back	LB	Left-back
HB	Half-back	MF	Midfielder
OR	Outside-right	OL	Outside-left
RW	Right-wing	LW	Left-wing
IF	Inside-forward		
IR	Inside-right	IL	Inside-left
CF	Centre-forward		
FW	Forward		
U	Utility player		

Position

- Playing positions are listed according to the tactical formations that were employed at the time. Thus the change in the names of defensive and midfield positions reflects the tactical evolution that occurred from the 1960s onwards.

Club career

- Club career is defined as the first and last calendar years in which the player appeared for the club in any of the competitions listed below.

League appearances and League goals

- League appearances and goals comprise those in the Southern League, the Football League and the Premier League. Appearances in the 1939–40 Football League season, abandoned after three games because of the Second World War, are excluded.

Total appearances and Total goals

- Total appearances and goals comprise those in the Football Alliance, Football League (including play-offs), Premier League, FA Cup, Football League Cup, UEFA Cup, Associate Members' Cup/Football League Trophy, and defunct competitions the Anglo-Italian Cup, Anglo-Scottish Cup, Watney Cup, Texaco Cup, Full Members' Cup and ScreenSport Super Cup. Matches in wartime competitions are excluded.

International selection

- Players who have been selected for full international football (not including amateur, Under-23 or other youth levels) have a link to their national side's Wikipedia page, denoted with a green box and asterisk*. Only the highest level of international competition is given, except where a player competed for more than one country, in which case the highest level reached for each is shown.

Players are listed according to the date they signed for the club. Appearances and goals are for first-team league matches; wartime matches are excluded. Substitute appearances included. Statistics correct as of 2 May 2026.

== Players ==
Name	Nationality	Pos	Norwich City career	Apps	Goals
Jimmy McEwen	England	LB	1905-1908	108	0
Billy Bushell	England	HB	1905-1910	154	7
Archie Livingstone	Scotland	WH	1905-1910	118	1
Thomas Allsopp	England	OL	1907-1911	132	27
Gerry Newlands	England	HB	1907-1910	105	1
Bobby Beale	England	GK	1908-1912	107	0
Billy Hampson	England	RB	1909-1913	140	10
Sam Wolstenholme	England*	HB	1909-1913	145	8
William Ingham	Wales	IF	1910-1914	131	32
Jock MacKenzie	Scotland	LB	1910-1915	204	2
Cecil Potter	England	OR	1911-1915	131	31
Harry Woods	England	IF	1911-1915	151	37
George Martin	England	CH	1913-1927	331	1
Sam Austin	England	FW	1920-1924	164	39
Robert Dennison	England	IF	1920-1924	126	39
Reg Wilkinson	England	WH	1920-1923	107	9
Charles Bradbrook	England	HB	1921-1926	106	1
Joe Hannah	England	HB	1921-1935	427	21
Phil Hope	England	RB	1921-1924	109	1
James Stoakes	England	OL	1921-1925	150	6
Charles Dennington	England	GK	1922-1929	209	0
Jimmy Banks	England	FW	1923-1926	136	26
James Jackson	England	FW	1923-1927	119	57
Joe McGrae	England	HB	1926-1929	124	3
Joe Richmond	England	U	1926-1930	130	9
Ernie Porter	England	OR	1927-1931	139	31
Jacky Slicer	England	OL	1927-1930	133	14
Duggie Lochhead	Scotland	WH	1929-1935	223	5
Ken Burditt	England	FW	1930-1936	173	61
Lionel Murphy	England	OL	1931-1934	132	35
Bernard Robinson	England	WH	1931-1949	380	14
Bill Smith	Scotland	LB	1931-1934	102	1
Norman Wharton	England	GK	1931-1935	109	0
Tom Halliday	England	HB	1933-1939	203	0
Jack Vinall	England	CF	1933-1937	181	80
Billy Warnes	England	OR	1933-1937	118	49
Sam Bowen	England	FB	1934-1938	139	2
Harry Dukes	England	GK	1934-1938; 1946	124	0
Harry Proctor	England	WH	1934-1947	116	3
Peter Burke	England	CH	1935-1939	119	0
Frank Manders	England	IF	1935-1939	137	43
John Church	England	LW	1937-1950	110	16
Len Dutton	Wales	WH	1946-1953	152	14
Les Eyre	England	IF	1946-1951	201	69
Norman Low	Scotland	HB	1946-1950	163	0
Denis Morgan	Wales	FB	1946-1956	250	3
Maurice Tobin	Scotland	LB	1946-1951	102	0
Ron Ashman	England	DF	1947-1963	662	66
Noel Kinsey	Wales*	IF	1947-1953	243	65
Ken Nethercott	England	GK	1947-1959	416	0
Don Pickwick	Wales	WH	1947-1956	244	11
Johnny Gavin	Republic of Ireland*	RW	1948-1954 1955-1958	338	132
Roy Hollis	England	FW	1948-1952	107	59
Peter Gordon	England	FW	1949-1958	176	37
Bill Lewis	England	LB	1949-1956	256	1
Reg Foulkes	England	HB	1950-1956	238	8
Roy McCrohan	England	WH	1951-1962	426	20
Billy Coxon	England	OL	1952-1958	105	26
Bobby Brennan	Northern Ireland*	IF	1953-1956 1957-1960	250	52
Ken Oxford	England	GK	1953-1958	128	0
Ralph Hunt	England	FW	1955-1958	124	67
Bryan Thurlow	England	RB	1955-1964	224	1
Barry Butler	England	DF	1957-1966	349	3
Matt Crowe	Scotland	WH	1957-1962	214	18
Terry Allcock	England	IF	1958-1969	389	127
Errol Crossan	Canada	FW	1958-1961	102	28
Sandy Kennon	Southern Rhodesia*	GK	1958-1965	213	0
Jimmy Hill	Northern Ireland*	FW	1959-1963	195	55
Joe Mullett	England	LB	1959-1968	248	5
Bill Punton	Scotland	LW	1959-1967	256	29
Gerry Mannion	England	RW	1961-1968	100	17
Tommy Bryceland	Scotland	FW	1962-1969	284	55
Phil Kelly	Republic of Ireland*	FB	1962-1967	115	2
Ron Davies	Wales*	FW	1963-1965	113	58
Kevin Keelan	England	GK	1963-1980	673	0
Freddie Sharpe	England	DF	1963-1969	111	0
Gordon Bolland	England	FW	1964-1968	105	29
Dave Stringer	England	DF	1964-1977	499	22
Terry Anderson	England	RW	1965-1974	279	19
Mal Lucas	Wales*	HB	1965-1970	204	8
Alan Black	Scotland	LB	1966-1974	203	1
Hugh Curran	Scotland*	FW	1966-1969	112	46
Ken Foggo	Scotland	RW	1967-1973	201	57
Trevor Howard	England	MF	1967-1974	156	19
Max Briggs	England	MF	1968-1974	170	2
Duncan Forbes	Scotland	DF	1968-1981	357	12
Clive Payne	England	RB	1968-1974	150	3
Geoff Butler	England	DF	1969-1976	196	1
Graham Paddon	England	MF	1969-1973 1976-1981	340	47
Peter Silvester	England	FW	1969-1974	113	37
Doug Livermore	England	MF	1970-1975	139	6
David Cross	England	FW	1971-1973	106	30
Colin Suggett	England	MF	1972-1978	243	29
Ted MacDougall	Scotland*	FW	1973-1977	112	51
Mel Machin	England	DF	1973-1977	117	4
Phil Boyer	England*	FW	1974-1977	116	34
Colin Sullivan	England	DF	1974-1979	157	3
Tony Powell	England	DF	1974-1981	275	5
David Jones	Wales*	DF	1975-1980	132	5
Mick McGuire	England	MF	1975-1983	203	12
Martin Peters	England*	MF	1975-1980	232	50
Kevin Bond	England	DF	1976-1981	161	14
Greg Downs	England	LB	1976-1985	206	8
Jimmy Neighbour	England	RW	1976-1979	115	5
Kevin Reeves	England*	FW	1976-1980	133	42
John Ryan	England	MF	1976-1980	132	29
Justin Fashanu	England	FW	1978-1981	103	40
Peter Mendham	England	MF	1978-1987	267	29
Paul Haylock	England	RB	1979-1986	193	4
Mark Barham	England*	RW	1980-1987	223	25
Dave Watson	England*	DF	1980-1986	256	11
Keith Bertschin	England	FW	1981-1985	114	29
John Deehan	England	FW	1981-1986	199	70
Steve Walford	England	DF	1981-1983	108	2
Chris Woods	England*	GK	1981-1986	267	0
Mick Channon	England*	FW	1982-1985	112	25
Dennis van Wijk	Netherlands	LB	1982-1986	155	4
Jeremy Goss	Wales*	MF	1983-1996	238	14
Robert Rosario	England	FW	1983-1991	161	29
Steve Bruce	England	DF	1984-1987	180	21
Dale Gordon	England	RW	1984-1991	261	31
Ian Culverhouse	England	RB	1985-1994	369	2
Kevin Drinkell	England	FW	1985-1988	150	57
Mike Phelan	England*	MF	1985-1989	194	10
Ian Butterworth	England	DF	1986-1994	293	4
Ian Crook	England	MF	1986-1997	418	24
Ruel Fox	Montserrat*	RW	1986-1994	173	22
Bryan Gunn	Scotland*	GK	1986-1998	477	0
Trevor Putney	England	LW	1986-1989	100	10
Mark Bowen	Wales*	LB	1987-1996	399	27
Robert Fleck	Scotland*	FW	1987-1992 1995-1998	299	84
Andy Linighan	England	DF	1988-1990	106	8
David Phillips	Wales*	MF	1989-1993	186	20
John Polston	England	DF	1990-1998	263	12
Daryl Sutch	England	U	1990-2002	352	9
Robert Ullathorne	England	LB	1990-1996	115	8
Rob Newman	England	DF	1991-1998	249	17
Chris Sutton	England*	FW	1991-1995	127	43
Darren Eadie	England	LW	1993-1999	204	38
Neil Adams	England	RW	1994-1999	206	30
Jamie Cureton	England	FW	1994-1996 2007-2010	108	23
Andy Marshall	England	GK	1994-2001	219	0
Mike Milligan	Republic of Ireland*	MF	1994-2000	142	5
Adrian Forbes	England	RW	1996-2001	121	8
Matt Jackson	England	DF	1996-2001	172	6
Darren Kenton	England	DF	1996-2003	175	9
Chris Llewellyn	Wales*	MF	1996-2003	158	18
Craig Fleming	England	DF	1997-2007	382	13
Lee Marshall	England	MF	1997-2001	131	13
Iwan Roberts	Wales*	FW	1997-2004	306	97
Darel Russell	England	MF	1997-2003 2007-2010	271	19
Malky Mackay	Scotland*	DF	1998-2004	232	15
Phil Mulryne	Northern Ireland*	MF	1998-2005	178	20
Robert Green	England*	GK	1999-2006	241	0
Paul McVeigh	Northern Ireland*	FW	2000-2007 2009-2010	246	40
Adam Drury	England	LB	2001-2012	361	4
Gary Holt	Scotland*	MF	2001-2005	182	3
Jason Shackell	England	DF	2002-2008, 2009	145	3
Darren Huckerby	England	FW	2003-2008	203	48
Gary Doherty	Republic of Ireland*	DF	2004-2010	227	14
Lee Croft	England	RW	2006-2009	131	9
Chris Martin	Scotland*	FW	2006-2013	117	34
Simon Lappin	Scotland	MF	2007-2013	126	4
David Marshall	Scotland*	GK	2007-2009	105	0
Jon Otsemobor	England	RB	2007-2010	104	2
Wes Hoolahan	Republic of Ireland*	MF	2008-2018	352	54
Grant Holt	England	FW	2009–2013	168	78
Russell Martin	Scotland*	DF	2010–2019	309	19
John Ruddy	England*	GK	2010–2017	243	0
Bradley Johnson	England	MF	2011–2015	154	21
Sébastien Bassong	Cameroon*	DF	2012–2017	135	5
Ryan Bennett	England	DF	2012–2017	119	2
Jonny Howson	England	MF	2012–2017	188	24
Alexander Tettey	Norway*	MF	2012–2021	263	8
Steven Whittaker	Scotland*	RB	2012–2017	108	7
Martin Olsson	Sweden*	LB	2013–2017	129	4
Nathan Redmond	England	RW	2013–2016	123	13
Josh Murphy	England	LW	2013–2016	100	18
Cameron Jerome	England	FW	2014–2018	138	42
Timm Klose	Switzerland*	DF	2016–2021	126	10
Jamal Lewis	Northern Ireland*	LB	2016–2020	100	2
Angus Gunn	Scotland*	GK	2017–2018, 2021–2025	172	0
Grant Hanley	Scotland*	DF	2017–2025	197	6
Todd Cantwell	England	MF	2017–2023	129	14
Mario Vrančić	Bosnia and Herzegovina*	MF	2017–2021	134	17
Marco Stiepermann	Germany	MF	2017–2021	115	12
Christoph Zimmermann	Germany	DF	2017–2022	139	4
Tim Krul	Netherlands*	GK	2018–2023	169	0
Max Aarons	England	RB	2018–2023	213	6
Teemu Pukki	Finland*	FW	2018–2023	210	88
Emiliano Buendía	Argentina*	MF	2018–2021	121	24
Kenny McLean	Scotland*	MF	2018–Present	293	13
Onel Hernández	Cuba*	MF	2018–2025	211	15
Adam Idah	Republic of Ireland*	FW	2019–2024	116	17
Jacob Sørensen	Denmark	MF	2020–2025	109	4
Josh Sargent	United States*	FW	2021–2026	157	56
Dimitris Giannoulis	Greece*	LB	2021–2024	101	0
Marcelino Núñez	Chile*	MF	2022–2025	116	11
Liam Gibbs	England	MF	2022–Present	100	2
Jack Stacey	England	RB	2023–Present	134	5
