= Deaths in January 2002 =

List article on Wikimedia

The following is a list of notable deaths in January 2002.

Entries for each day are listed alphabetically by surname. A typical entry lists information in the following sequence:

- Name, age, country of citizenship at birth, subsequent country of citizenship (if applicable), reason for notability, cause of death (if known), and reference.

== January 2002 ==
=== 1 ===
- Rolando Del Bello, 76, Italian tennis player.
- Mohand Arav Bessaoud, 77, Algerian writer and activist.
- Daulat Bikram Bista, 76, Nepali writer and poet.
- Paul Hubschmid, 84, Swiss actor.
- Bonnie Mealing, 89, Australian Olympic swimmer (1928, 1932).
- Eugene Nickerson, 83, American county executive and judge, complications from ulcer surgery.
- Carol Ohmart, 74, American actress (House on Haunted Hill, The Wild Party, The Scarlet Hour) and model.
- Julia Phillips, 57, American film producer (The Sting, Taxi Driver, Close Encounters of the Third Kind) and author, Oscar winner (1974), cancer.
- Patrick Kwame Kusi Quaidoo, 77, Ghanaian politician and businessman.
- Nuchhungi Renthlei, 88, Indian poet and singer.
- Ted Rigg, 88, American basketball player.
- Arne Røgden, 84, Norwegian Olympic bobsledder (1952, 1956).
- Astrid Sampe, 92, Swedish textile designer.
- Catya Sassoon, 33, American actress, singer and model, heart attack after drug overdose.
- Meg Wyllie, 84, American actress (The Twilight Zone, Perry Mason, Star Trek, The Fugitive).

=== 2 ===
- Armi Aavikko, 43, Finnish beauty queen and singer, pneumonia.
- Anil Agarwal, 55, Indian environmentalist and science correspondent.
- Rui Campos, 79, Brazilian football player.
- Roberto Camposeco, 60, Guatemalan footballer and Olympian (1968).
- Pablo Antonio Cuadra, 89, Nicaraguan essayist, playwright, and graphic artist.
- Ahmed Dawood, 96, Pakistani industrialist and philanthropist.
- Ian Grist, 63, British Conservative politician, stroke.
- Heath MacQuarrie, 82, Canadian politician, scholar, and writer.
- Charlie Mitten, 80, English football player and manager.
- Chester Nimitz Jr., 86, American submarine commander.
- Bibi Osterwald, 81, American actress.
- Bob Stevens, 85, American sportswriter.

=== 3 ===
- Donald Martin Carroll, 92, American Roman Catholic priest.
- Satish Dhawan, 81, Indian aerospace engineer.
- Miki Dora, 67, American surfer, stunt double and actor (Beach Blanket Bingo, How to Stuff a Wild Bikini), pancreatic cancer.
- Juan García Esquivel, 83, Mexican bandleader and composer for film and television.
- Freddy Heineken, 78, Dutch beer magnate, pneumonia.
- Martin Ruby, 79, American gridiron football player (Brooklyn Dodgers, New York Yankees, New York Yanks).
- Al Smith, 73, American baseball player (Cleveland Indians, Chicago White Sox, Baltimore Orioles, Boston Red Sox).
- Baldur R. Stefansson, 84, Canadian agricultural scientist.

=== 4 ===
- Nathan Chapman, 31, U.S. Army soldier, first American soldier killed in combat in the war in Afghanistan.
- Georg Ericson, 82, Swedish football (soccer) player and coach.
- Ada Falcón, 96, Argentine tango dancer, singer and film actress.
- Michael Howard, 79, English choral conductor, organist and composer.
- Douglas Jung, 74, Canadian politician and a member of Parliament (House of Commons), heart attack.
- Mustafa Krantja, 80, Albanian classical music conductor and composer.
- Grace Mera Molisa, 55, Ni-Vanuatu politician, poet and feminist.
- Jim Sears, 70, American gridiron football player (Chicago Cardinals, Los Angeles Chargers, Denver Broncos).
- Adrián Zabala, 85, Cuban-American baseball player (New York Giants).

=== 5 ===
- Charles J. Bishop, 15, American high school student, suicide by plane crash.
- Igor Cassini, 86, American syndicated gossip columnist (Cholly Knickerbocker) for the Hearst newspaper.
- Valentin Chernikov, 64, Soviet Olympic fencer (1956, 1960).
- Fielding Dawson, 71, American author, poet and artist.
- Alan Dick, 71, British sprinter and Olympian (1952).
- Roger Gyselinck, 81, Belgian racing cyclist.
- Astrid Henning-Jensen, 87, Danish film director, actress, and screenwriter.
- Kamel Maghur, 67, Libyan lawyer and diplomat.
- Federico Mariscal, 91, Mexican Olympic diver (1928, 1932).
- Graham Ryder, 52, English geologist and lunar scientist, cancer of the esophagus.
- Vadim Shefner, 86, Soviet and Russian poet and writer.
- Bryan Thurlow, 65, English football player.

=== 6 ===
- Bobby Austin, 68, American country musician ("Apartment No. 9", "For Your Love").
- Per-Arne Berglund, 74, Swedish Olympic javelin thrower (1948, 1952).
- Serge Brignoni, 98, Swiss avant-garde painter and sculptor.
- Sanya Dharmasakti, 94, Thai jurist, university professor and politician, Prime Minister of Thailand from 1973 to 1975.
- Henryk Jagodziński, 76, Polish Olympic rower (1952, 1956).
- Kunjandi, 82, Indian actor.
- Herbert N. Maletz, 88, American judge.
- Johnnie Mae Matthews, 79, American blues and R&B singer, songwriter, and record producer, cancer.
- Mario Nascimbene, 88, Italian film soundtrack composer.
- John W. Reynolds, 80, American politician and jurist, Governor of Wisconsin (1963–1965).
- Fred Taylor, 77, American basketball coach (Ohio State University) and baseball player (Washington Senators).
- Marian Wenzel, 69, British artist and art historian, leading authority on the art of medieval Bosnia and Herzegovina, cancer.
- Christa Worthington, 45, American fashion writer (Women's Wear Daily, Cosmopolitan, ELLE, Harper's Bazaar), homicide.

=== 7 ===
- Frank Cave, 59, British trade unionist and political activist (National Union of Mineworkers), brain cancer.
- Geoff Crompton, 46, American basketball player (Denver Nuggets, Portland Trail Blazers, Milwaukee Bucks, San Antonio Spurs, Cleveland Cavaliers), leukemia.
- Geoffrey Crossley, 80, British Formula One race car driver, stroke.
- René Etiemble, 92, French essayist, scholar, and novelist.
- Mighty Igor, 70, American professional wrestler, heart attack.
- Björn Landström, 84, Finnish-Swedish artist, writer, and illustrator.
- Jon Lee, 33, British drummer (Feeder), suicide.
- Bill Lenny, 78, British film editor.
- Hal Marnie, 83, American baseball player (Philadelphia Phillies).
- Raúl Mazorra, 73, Cuban sprinter and Olympian (1948, 1952).
- Philip Roettinger, 86, American CIA officer and Olympic sports shooter (1948).
- Avery Schreiber, 66, American comedian and actor, heart attack.
- Walter Warning, 84, German footballer.
- Lev Zaykov, 78, Soviet politician and statesman.

=== 8 ===
- M. S. Bartlett, 91, English statistician.
- Romeo Cascarino, 79, American composer of classical music.
- Stanko Despot, 73, Croatian Olympic rower (1952).
- David McWilliams, 56, Northern Irish singer-songwriter ("Days of Pearly Spencer"), heart attack.
- Kitanonada Noboru, 78, Japanese sumo wrestler.
- Alexander Prokhorov, 85, Soviet physicist, winner of 1964 Nobel Prize in Physics.
- Dave Thomas, 69, American entrepreneur, founder of Wendy's, liver cancer, liver tumor.
- Glayde Whitney, 62, American behavioral geneticist and psychologist, promoted controversial race based genetics.
- Viggo Widerøe, 97, Norwegian aviator and entrepreneur.

=== 9 ===
- Benjamín Casado, 73, Puerto Rican Olympic high jumper (1948).
- Esko Kaonpää, 59, Finnish Olympic ice hockey player (1964).
- Mush March, 93, Canadian ice hockey player (Chicago Black Hawks).
- Bill McCutcheon, 77, American actor (Sesame Street, Anything Goes, Steel Magnolias), Tony winner (1988), Alzheimer's disease.
- Wang Ruoshui, 75, Chinese journalist, political theorists and philosopher, lung cancer.
- K. William Stinson, 71, U.S. Representative from Washington.

=== 10 ===
- Olga Biglieri, 86, Italian futurist painter and aviator.
- Andrew Boyd, 91, American Olympic fencer (1936, 1948).
- John Buscema, 74, American comic book artist (Marvel Comics), cancer.
- Wallie Amos Criswell, 92, American pastor, author and two-term president of the Southern Baptist Convention from 1968 to 1970.
- Philip Drazin, 67, British mathematician, university teacher and author, an international expert in fluid dynamics.
- Andrés Hammersley, 82, Chilean tennis player.
- Günther Ortmann, 85, German Olympic field handball player (1936).
- Cedric Smith, 84, British statistician.
- Ikkō Tanaka, 71, Japanese graphic designer, heart attack.
- C. R. Vyas, 77, Indian classical singer.

=== 11 ===
- Gerrit Brokx, 68, Dutch politician.
- Gene Dinwiddie, 65, American blues saxophonist.
- Fred Gantt, 79, American basketball player.
- Shanti S. Gupta, 76, Indian-American statistician.
- Walter Heinzel, 94, Czech Olympic bobsledder (1936).
- Henry Pearcy, 79, American basketball player.
- Ajay Mitra Shastri, 67, Indian academic, historian and numismatist.
- Christer Strömholm, 83, Swedish photographer.
- Henri Verneuil, 81, French filmmaker and playwright.

=== 12 ===
- Bernard Bennett, 70, English snooker and billiards player.
- John Berger, 92, Swedish Olympic cross-country skier (1936).
- Moss Evans, 76, British union leader, general secretary of the Transport and General Workers Union.
- Edwin M. Martin, 93, American diplomat and ambassador, pneumonia.
- Harold B. McSween, 75, American politician (U.S. Representative for Louisiana's 8th congressional district) and businessman.
- Max Ordman, 75, South African wrestler and Olympian (1960).
- Ernest Pintoff, 70, American film and television director and animator (Academy Award for Best Animated Short Film for The Critic), stroke.
- Henry S. Reuss, 89, American politician.
- Neville Sandelson, 78, British politician.
- Stanley Unwin, 90, South African-born English comedian.
- Cyrus Vance, 84, United States Secretary of State, international peacemaker, pneumonia.

=== 13 ===
- Richard Bolt, 90, American physicist, specializing in acoustics, founded Bolt, Beranek and Newman.
- Ted Demme, 38, American film and television director (Blow, The Ref, Yo! MTV Raps, Beautiful Girls), heart attack.
- Samuel Dolin, 84, Canadian composer and music educator.
- Guadalupe Dueñas, Mexican short story writer and essayist.
- Charity Adams Earley, 83, United States Army officer.
- Paul Fannin, 94, American politician and businessman, Governor of Arizona (1959–1965), U.S. Senator from Arizona (1965–1977), cerebrovascular disease.
- Gregorio Fuentes, 104, Cuban sailor and Ernest Hemingway's first mate, fishing companion and confidant.
- Georges Glasser, 94, French tennis player and president of the Tennis Club de Paris.
- Antonije Isaković, 78, Serbian writer.
- Pierre Joubert, 91, French illustrator and comics artist.
- Frank Shuster, 85, Canadian comedian.
- José María Sánchez-Silva, 90, Spanish writer.
- Christian von Bülow, 84, Danish Olympic sailor (1956, 1964).

=== 14 ===
- Edith Bouvier Beale, 84, American socialite, fashion model and cabaret performer, known as "Little Edie", heart attack.
- Michael Young, Baron Young of Dartington, 86, British sociologist, social activist and politician, coined the term "meritocracy".
- David John Hamer, 78, Australian politician.
- Rachel Bubar Kelly, 79, American politician for the Prohibition Party.
- Cele Goldsmith Lalli, 68, American editor, accidental death.
- Bob Prittie, 82, Canadian politician, member of the House of Commons of Canada (1962-1968).
- Darrell Robison, 70, American Olympic alpine skier (1952).
- Antonio Sbardella, 76, Italian football player, referee and sports official.
- Olav Selvaag, 89, Norwegian engineer and residential contractor.

=== 15 ===
- Michael Anthony Bilandic, 78, American politician (39th Mayor of Chicago), heart failure.
- Eugène Brands, 89, Dutch painter, an early member of the COBRA avant-garde art movement.
- Jean Dockx, 60, Belgian football player and manager.
- David Epstein, 71, American composer, conductor, and music scientist.
- Miguel Flores, 81, Chilean football player.
- John M. Gaver, Jr., 61, American trainer of thoroughbred racehorses.
- Jeremy Hawk, 83, British actor (Elizabeth).
- Tomislav Kaloperović, 69, Yugoslav and Serbian football player and coach.
- Erhard Minder, 76, Swiss handball player and Olympic modern pentathlete (1952, 1956).
- Vithabai Bhau Mang Narayangaonkar, Indian artist.
- Sakari Olkkonen, 71, Finnish Olympic gymnast (1960).
- Michel Poniatowski, 79, French politician.
- Jozef Smits, 71, Belgian Olympic water polo player (1952, 1960).

=== 16 ===
- John Boulos, 80, Haitian soccer player.
- Robert Hanbury Brown, 85, British astronomer and astrophysicist, pioneered the development of radar and radio astronomy.
- Jean Elleinstein, 74, French historian specializing in communism.
- Henry E. Erwin, 80, American U.S. Army Air Forces airman and recipient of the Medal of Honor for his actions in World War II.
- Ivan Foxwell, 87, British film producer and screenwriter (Colditz Story, A Touch of Larceny, The Quiller Memorandum).
- Hipolito Frank Garcia, 76, American district judge (United States District Court for the Western District of Texas).
- Ralph Jacobi, 73, Australian politician.
- Milutin Kukanjac, 67, Yugoslav military officer.
- Bobo Olson, 73, American boxer, Alzheimer's disease.
- Ron Taylor, 49, American actor (The Wiz, The Simpsons, Rover Dangerfield), heart attack.
- Jim Tunney, 78, Irish Fianna Fáil politician.
- Michael Walford, 86, British field hockey, rugby, cricket player, and Olympian (1948).

=== 17 ===
- Peter Adamson, 71, British actor (Coronation Street), stomach cancer.
- Camilo José Cela, 85, Spanish novelist, poet, and essayist, 1989 Nobel Prize in Literature, cardiovascular disease.
- Queenie Leonard, 96, British character actress and singer.
- Harvey Matusow, 75, American artist, communist and Federal Bureau of Investigation informer, car accident.
- Eddie Meduza, 53, Swedish rockabilly composer and musician, heart attack.
- Bus Mertes, 80, American gridiron football player and coach, stroke.
- Brian Simon, 86, British educationalist and historian.
- Héctor Tosar, 78, Uruguayan pianist and classical composer.

=== 18 ===
- Raimondo Carnera, 86, Danish Olympic fencer (1952).
- Celso Daniel, 50, Brazilian politician and mayor, murdered.
- Michel Fleury, 78, French historian, archivist and archaeologist, specialising in the history and archaeology of Paris.
- Jovdat Hajiyev, 84, Azerbaijani composers of the Soviet period.
- Alex Hannum, 78, American basketball coach.
- Yasmeen Ismail, 51, Pakistani television actress and theater director.
- Jorma Karhunen, 88, Finnish Air Force ace.
- Charles William Kraft Jr., 98, American district judge (United States District Court for the Eastern District of Pennsylvania).
- Quincy Smith, 83, American baseball player.

=== 19 ===
- Jeff Astle, 59, English footballer, degenerative brain disease.
- Stanisław Bukowski, 79, Polish Olympic cross-country skier (1948, 1956).
- Jim Cameron, 71, Australian politician (Speaker of the New South Wales Legislative Assembly).
- Martti Miettunen, 94, Finnish politician, prime minister.
- Vavá, 67, Brazilian football player and Olympian (1952), heart attack.
- Ricky Womack, 40, American professional boxer (1982 U.S. amateur heavyweight champion), suicide.

=== 20 ===
- John Aveni, 66, American gridiron football player (Indiana University, Chicago Bears, Washington Redskins).
- Walter Carter, 72, Canadian politician and a member of Parliament (House of Commons).
- Jean-Toussaint Desanti, 87, French educator and philosopher.
- Moti Lal Dhar, 87, India drug chemist and academic.
- Carrie Hamilton, 38, American actress (Cool World, Fame), lung cancer.
- John Jackson, 77, American blues musician, liver cancer.
- R. N. Kao, 83, Indian spy and the first chief of India's intelligence agency.
- Ivan Karabyts, 57, Ukrainian composer and conductor.
- Harold Kasket, 75, English actor.
- Rudolf Staffel, 90, American ceramic artist and educator.
- Luule Viilma, 51, Estonian doctor, esotericist and practitioner of alternative medicine, car crash.

=== 21 ===
- Max Angst, 80, Swiss Olympic bobsledder (1956).
- Rolando Barral, 62, Cuban actor and talk show host (El Show de Rolando Barral), often called "the Latino Johnny Carson", stroke.
- Peggy Lee, 81, American singer & actress (Lady and the Tramp, Pete Kelly's Blues, The Jazz Singer), diabetes, heart attack.
- John Arthur Love, 85, American attorney and Republican politician (36th governor of Colorado, first "Energy Czar").
- Adolfo Marsillach, 73, Spanish actor, playwright and theatre director, prostate cancer.
- Charlie Puckett, 90, Australian sportsman.
- Makhan Singh, 63, Indian sprinter and Olympian (1964).
- Zenon Snylyk, 68, Ukrainian-American soccer player and Olympian (1956).
- George Trapp, 53, American basketball player (Atlanta Hawks, Detroit Pistons), stabbed.

=== 22 ===
- Sheldon Allman, 77, Canadian-American singer, actor (Hud, In Cold Blood), songwriter and voice actor.
- Kenneth Armitage, 85, British sculptor.
- Peter Bardens, 56, English keyboardist and a founding member of the British progressive rock group Camel, lung cancer.
- Guido Bernardi, 80, Italian cyclist and Olympian (1948).
- Henry Cosby, 73, American songwriter ("My Cherie Amour", "The Tears of a Clown", "Uptight (Everything's Alright)").
- Eric de Maré, 91, British architectural photographer and writer.
- George W. Dickerson, 88, American college football coach, interim head coach at UCLA for three games in 1958.
- Stanley Marcus, 96, American businessman.
- John McGrath, 66, British playwright and theatre theorist.
- Jean Patchett, 75, American fashion model.
- Salomon Tandeng Muna, 89, Cameroonian politician.
- Jack Shea, 91, American speed skater and Olympian (1932), traffic collision.
- A. H. Weiler, 93, American writer, editor and film critic for The New York Times.
- John Andrew Young, 85, American politician (U.S. Representative for Texas's 14th congressional district).

=== 23 ===
- Paul Aars, 67, American racing driver.
- Louis T. Benezet, 86, American educator and president of multiple colleges.
- Pierre Bourdieu, 71, French sociologist and philosopher (Distinction: A Social Critique of the Judgment of Taste), cancer.
- Charlie Bradshaw, 65, American gridiron football player (Baylor, Los Angeles Rams, Pittsburgh Steelers, Detroit Lions), cancer.
- Thomas Carey, 70, American operatic baritone, pancreatic cancer.
- Domingo Drummond, 44, Honduran football player, heart attack.
- Chet Francis, 83, American basketball player.
- Igor Kipnis, 71, American harpsichordist, pianist and conductor, cancer.
- Vittorio Mero, 27, Italian football player, traffic collision.
- Robert Nozick, 63, American philosopher, lung cancer.
- Pier Giorgio Perotto, 71, Italian electrical engineer and inventor.
- Gerhard Prokop, 62, German football player and manager.
- John Symank, 66, American gridiron football player (Green Bay Packers, St. Louis Cardinals).
- Johannes E. Vecchi, 70, Argentine Roman Catholic priest, Rector Major of the Salesians.
- Phil Warren, 63, New Zealand music promoter and politician, chairman of Auckland Regional Council.

=== 24 ===
- Stuart Burge, 84, British film director, producer and actor (Nottingham Playhouse, Royal Court Theatre).
- Paul B. Carpenter, 73, American politician (California State Assembly, California State Senate), convicted of corruption.
- Nunzio Filogamo, 99, Italian television and radio presenter, actor and singer.
- Peter Gzowski, 67, Canadian broadcaster, writer and reporter, emphysema.
- Elie Hobeika, 45, Lebanese militia commander and politician, murdered.
- Irene Kotowicz, 82, American baseball player.
- Upendra Kumar, 60, Indian composer.
- Andrei Mercea, 76, Romanian football player and Olympian (1952).
- Bernie Price, 86, American basketball player.
- Edgar Ritchie, 85, Canadian diplomat.
- Tommy Sampson, 89, American baseball player.
- Kurt Schaffenberger, 81, American comic book artist (Captain Marvel, Superman, Superman's Girl Friend, Lois Lane).
- Gregorio Walerstein, 88, Mexican film producer and screenwriter.

=== 25 ===
- J. Clifford Baxter, 43, American executive (Enron Corporation), suicide by gunshot.
- Willard Estey, 82, Canadian justice of the Supreme Court of Canada.
- Chris Perry, 73, Indian musician, composer, songwriter and film producer.
- Melvin Perry, 76, Canadian politician, member of the Senate of Canada (1999-2000).
- Winston Place, 87, English cricketer.

=== 26 ===
- Phyllis Bartholomew, 87, English track and field athlete.
- Francisco Cabañas, 90, Mexican Olympic flyweight boxer (1932).
- Dorothy Carrington, 91, British writer, one of the leading scholars on Corsican culture and history.
- Rudolph B. Davila, 85, United States Army officer, World War II Medal of Honor recipient.
- Loonis McGlohon, 80, American songwriter and jazz pianist.
- Harmon Rowe, 78, American football player (New York Yankees, New York Giants).
- Milt Ticco, 79, American basketball player.
- Ray Yochim, 79, American baseball player (St. Louis Cardinals).

=== 27 ===
- Robert L. Chapman, 81, American professor, dictionary editor and thesaurus editor (Roget's Thesaurus).
- Yelena Gorchakova, 68, Russian javelin thrower and Olympic medalist (1952, 1964).
- John James, 87, British racing driver.
- Csaba Kovács, 69, Hungarian rower and Olympian (1952, 1956, 1960).
- Edgar Manske, 89, American gridiron football player (Philadelphia Eagles, Chicago Bears, Pittsburgh Pirates).
- Franz Meyers, 93, German politician and Minister President of North Rhine-Westphalia.
- Reggie Sanders, 52, American baseball player (Detroit Tigers).
- Pierre Vago, 91, French architect.
- Alain Vanzo, 73, French opera singer and composer, stroke.

=== 28 ===
- Hilda Carrero, 50, Venezuelan model and actress, cancer.
- Andrew W. Cooper, 74, American activist, journalist, and editor-in-chief of The City Sun, stroke.
- Gustaaf Deloor, 88, Belgian road racing cyclist.
- Herbert Hirche, 91, German architect and furniture and product designer.
- Hennie Keetelaar, 75, Dutch Olympic water polo player (1948).
- Andy Kulberg, 57, American musician, lymphoma.
- Astrid Lindgren, 94, Swedish writer of fiction and screenplays, viral infection.
- Erhard Neumann, 69, American Olympic cyclist (1956).
- Jack Witikka, 85, Finnish film director and screenwriter.
- Ayşenur Zarakolu, 55, Turkish publisher and human rights activist, cancer.

=== 29 ===
- Stephen Wayne Anderson, 48, American murderer, execution by lethal injection.
- Suzanne Bloch, 94, Swiss-American musician, teacher and early music specialist.
- Florian Côté, 72, Canadian politician (member of Parliament representing Nicolet—Yamaska, Quebec and Richelieu, Quebec).
- Daniel De Luce, 90, American journalist for Associated Press from 1929 to 1976.
- Richard Grenier, 68, American columnist and film critic, heart attack.
- Sarla Grewal, 74, Indian State Governor.
- Haim Haberfeld, 70, Israeli trade union leader and the chairman of the Israel Football Association.
- R. M. Hare, 82, English moral philosopher, series of strokes.
- Heinz Hennig, 74, German choral conductor and an academic teacher.
- Stratford Johns, 76, South African-born British actor (Z Cars, Softly, Softly, Cromwell), heart disease.
- Dick Lane, 73, American Hall of Fame football player (Los Angeles Rams, Chicago Cardinals, Detroit Lions), heart attack.
- Phil McCall, 76, British actor.
- John R. McGann, 77, American prelate of the Catholic Church.
- Berto Pisano, 73, Italian composer, conductor, arranger and jazz musician.
- Harold Russell, 88, Canadian-American actor (The Best Years of Our Lives), Oscar winner (1947), heart attack.

=== 30 ===
- Carlo Karges, 50, German musician, liver disease.
- Inge Morath, 78, Austrian-born American photographer, cancer.
- Jeanne Robert, 91, French historian and epigrapher.
- Louis Salica, 89, American boxer (1935 and 1940 world bantamweight title), and Olympian (1932).

=== 31 ===
- Ruslan Abdullayev, 57, Azerbaijani football player and manager.
- Francis Acharya, 90, Belgian Roman Catholic monk.
- Ernest Butler, 82, English football player.
- Jim Camp, 77, American gridiron football player (Brooklyn Dodgers) and college football head coach (George Washington University).
- Harry Chiti, 69, American baseball player (Chicago Cubs, Kansas City Athletics, Detroit Tigers, New York Mets).
- Bettie du Toit, 91, South African trade unionist and anti-apartheid activist.
- Gabby Gabreski, 83, Polish-American World War II and Korean War fighter pilot, heart attack.
- Nelson Guarda, 68, Brazilian Olympic rower (1956).
- Ad Hermes, 72, Dutch politician.
- Henry Kloss, 72, American audio engineer and entrepreneur.
- Jim Letsinger, 90, American gridiron football player (Pittsburgh Pirates).
- Evelyn Scott, 86, American film and television actress (The Untouchables, Bonanza, Bachelor Father, Peyton Place).
- Ger Stroker, 85, Dutch football player.
- Karel Voous, 81, Dutch ornithologist and author.
- Predrag Vranicki, 80, Yugoslav and Croatian philosopher and Marxist humanist.
