= Fred Hopkinson =

English footballer

Personal information
- Full name: Fred Hopkinson
- Date of birth: 26 April 1908
- Place of birth: Royton, England
- Date of death: 1986 (aged 77–78)
- Height: 5 ft 7 in (1.70 m)
- Positions: Wing half; inside right

Senior career*
| Years | Team | Apps | (Gls) |
- Shotton
- Seaham Harbour
| 1927–1928 | Sheffield Wednesday | 0 | (0) |
| 1928–1934 | Darlington | 158 | (10) |
| 1934–1936 | Barrow | 63 | (2) |
| 1936 | Horden Colliery Welfare | | |
| 1936–19?? | South Shields | | |
- * Club domestic league appearances and goals

Fred Hopkinson (26 April 1908 – 1986) was an English footballer who made 221 appearances in the Football League playing as a wing half or inside right for Darlington and Barrow in the 1920s and 1930s. He was also on the books of Sheffield Wednesday, but without representing that club in league competition, and played non-league football for Shotton, Seaham Harbour, Horden Colliery Welfare and South Shields.

In 1933, Hopkinson and Darlington teammates Harry Brown, Billy Eden and Tom Halliday were members of the Rest of Durham XI that faced First Division club Sunderland in a match to celebrate the silver jubilee of the Durham County Football Association.

Hopkinson was born in Royton, Lancashire, the son of Samuel Hopkinson, a piecer, and his wife Martha.
