= Dennington (surname) =

Dennington is an English toponymic surname. Notable people with this name include:

- Arthur Dennington, British conductor and composer
- Charles Dennington, English football goalkeeper
- Jack Dennington, Australian rules footballer
- Matthew Dennington, South African cricketer
