= Norwich City F.C. Hall of Fame =

Sports hall of fame for English association football club

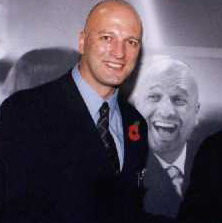
Bryan Gunn signed for the club in 1986.

The Norwich City F.C. Hall of Fame honours Norwich City F.C. players, coaches, managers, directors and executives who have "made the greatest contribution to the club in its long history both on and off the pitch." During the club's centenary season (2002–03), a Hall of Fame was created. Initially, 100 significant figures from the club's history were honoured; 25 were nominated by the Norwich City Football Club Historical Trust and a further 75 were subsequently elected by supporters. A further 20 members were inducted in 2006 and 2009, again with some chosen by the Trust and some elected by supporters. In 2012, another eight members were selected, three by the Norwich City Football Club Historical Trust and five elected by supporters.

Six members of the Hall of Fame both played for and managed or coached at the club, most recently Gary Megson and Doug Livermore, respectively. Mike Walker is the only manager in the list to have had two spells as City manager.

== List of members ==
Below is a sortable list of the inductees, indicating members who have also won the club's Player of the Season award since its inception in 1967.

"Type" refers to the type of admission to the Hall of Fame.

Inaugural: One of 25 people nominated by the Norwich City Football Club Historical Trust in 2003 as inaugural members
2003: One of 75 people admitted to the Hall of Fame in 2003 having been elected by supporters as inaugural members
2006: One of 10 additional people admitted to the Hall of Fame in 2006
2009: One of 10 additional people admitted to the Hall of Fame in 2009
2012: One of 8 additional people admitted to the Hall of Fame in 2012

Winner of Player of the Year award

Name	Position	Seasons	Nationality	Caps	Appearances	Goals	Type
Neil Adams	Player; Manager	1994–1999; 2014	England		206	30	2003
Terry Allcock	Player	1958–1969	England		389	127	Inaugural
Russell Allison	Groundsman						2009
Ron Ashman	Player; Manager	1947–1963; 1962–1966	England		662	56	Inaugural
Dean Ashton	Player	2005–2006	England		44	17	2012
Mark Barham	Player	1980–1987	England				2009
Craig Bellamy	Player	1997–2001	Wales	44	91	34	2003
Gordon Bennett	Executive	1989–1999	England		n/a	n/a	2003
Terry Bly	Player	1956–1960	England		67	38	2003
John Bond	Manager	1973–1980	England		n/a	n/a	2003
Jimmy Bone	Player	1972–1973	Scotland		51	15	2003
Mark Bowen	Player	1987–1996	Wales		399	27	2003
Phil Boyer	Player	1974–1977	England		140	40	2003
Bobby Brennan	Player	1953–1960	Northern Ireland		250	52	Inaugural
Max Briggs	Player	1964–1977	England		135	1	2006
Ken Brown	Manager	1980–1987	England		n/a	n/a	2003
Steve Bruce	Player	1984–1987	England		180	21	2003
Tommy Bryceland	Player	1962–1969	Scotland		284	55	2003
Ollie Burton	Player	1960–1963	Wales	9	73	9	2006
Barry Butler	Player	1957–1965	England		349	3	Inaugural
Ian Butterworth	Player; Coach; Caretaker Manager	1992–1994; 2009; 2009	England				2006
Mick Channon	Player	1982–1985	England				2003
Robert Chase	Board	1982–1996	England		n/a	n/a	2003
Robert Collinson	Player	n/a	England		n/a	n/a	2009
Ian Crook	Player	1986–1997	England		418	24	2003
David Cross	Player	1971–1973	England		106	30	2003
Errol Crossan	Player	1958–1960	Canada		116	32	2003
Matt Crowe	Player	1957–1962	Scotland		214	18	2003
Ian Culverhouse	Player	1985–1994	England		369	2	2003
Hugh Curran	Player	1966–1969	Scotland	5	124	53	2003
Ron Davies	Player	1963–1966	Wales	29	126	66	Inaugural
John Deehan	Player; Manager	1981–1985; 1994–1995	England		199	70	Inaugural
Kevin Drinkell	Player	1985–1988	England		150	57	2003
Adam Drury	Player	2001–2012	England		320	4	2012
Dion Dublin	Player	2006–2008	England		79	16	2009
Darren Eadie	Player	1993–1999	England				2003
Les Eyre	Player	1946–1951	England		201	69	2003
Efan Ekoku	Player	1993–1994	Nigeria		38	16	2012
Justin Fashanu	Player	1978–1981	England				2003
Robert Fleck	Player	1987–1992; 1995–1998	Scotland				2003
Craig Fleming	Player	1997–2007	England		343	12	2003
Ken Foggo	Player	1967–1973	Scotland				2003
Duncan Forbes	Player	1968–1980	Scotland		357	12	Inaugural
Michael Foulger	Director		England				2012
Reg Foulkes	Player	1950–1956	England				2003
Ruel Fox	Player	1986–1994	Montserrat				2003
Billy Furness	Player	1937–1947	England		96	21	2003
Johnny Gavin	Player	1949–1958	Republic of Ireland		338	132	Inaugural
Dale Gordon	Player	1984–1991	England				2003
Jeremy Goss	Player	1984–1996	Wales	9	238	23	2003
Robert Green	Player	1996–2006	England	11			2006
Bryan Gunn	Player; Executive; Caretaker Manager; Manager	1986–1998; 1998–2009; 2009; 2009	Scotland		477	0	Inaugural
Tom Halliday	Player		England				2006
Joe Hannah	Player	1921–1935	England		427	22	Inaugural
Asa Hartford	Player	1984–1985	Scotland				2003
Jimmy Hill	Player	1959–1963	Northern Ireland				2003
Wes Hoolahan	Player	2008–2018	Republic of Ireland	33	258	39	2012
Roy Hollis	Player	1948–1952	England				2003
Gary Holt	Player	2001–2005	Scotland	11			2003
Grant Holt	Player	2009–2013	England		118	64	2012
John Howes	Player		England				2006
Darren Huckerby	Player	2003–2008	England				2006
Ralph Hunt	Player		England				2003
Tommy Johnston	Player	1952–1954	Scotland				2009
Kevin Keelan	Player	1963–1980	England				Inaugural
Sandy Kennon	Player	1958–1965	South Africa				2003
Darren Kenton	Player	1996–2003	England				2003
Noel Kinsey	Player		Wales				2003
Alf Kirchen	Player; Coach; Director		England				2012
Paul Lambert	Manager	2009–2012	Scotland				2012
Bill Lewis	Player		England				2003
Doug Livermore	Coach		England				2003
Doug Lochhead	Manager		England				Inaugural
Norman Low	Manager		Scotland				2003
Archie Macaulay	Manager		England				Inaugural
Ted MacDougall	Player		Scotland				2003
Mel Machin	Player		England				2006
Malky Mackay	Player		Scotland	5			2003
Andy Marshall	Player		England				2003
Peter Mendham	Player		England				2003
Roy McCrohan	Player		England				2003
Paul McVeigh	Player		Northern Ireland				2003
Gary Megson	Player; Manager		England				2003
Peter Mendham	Player; Executive		England				2003
Denis Morgan	Player	1946–1956	England		250	3	2003
Roger Munby	Chairman	2002–2009	England				2009
Jimmy Neighbour	Player		England				2003
Ken Nethercott	Player		England				Inaugural
Rob Newman	Player		England				2003
Jon Newsome	Player		England				2003
Maurice Norman	Player		England				2003
Joseph Nutchey	Founder		England				Inaugural
Martin O'Neill	Player; Manager		Northern Ireland				2003
Graham Paddon	Player		England				2003
Tom Parker	Manager		England				2006
Martin Peters	Player		England				Inaugural
Mike Phelan	Player		England				2006
David Phillips	Player	1989–1993	Wales	24	197	20	2009
Don Pickwick	Player		Wales				2003
John Polston	Player		England				2003
Tony Powell	Player		England				2003
Bill Punton	Player		Scotland				2003
Stan Ramsay	Player		England				Inaugural
Kevin Reeves	Player		England				2003
Iwan Roberts	Player	1997–2004	Wales	15	246	86	Inaugural
Bernard Robinson	Player		England				Inaugural
Davie Ross	Player		England				Inaugural
Ron Saunders	Manager		England				Inaugural
Tim Sheppard	Physiotherapist		England				2003
Peter Silvester	Player	1969–1973	England				2009
Delia Smith	Board		England				2003
Arthur South	Board		England				Inaugural
Dave Stringer	Player; Manager		England				Inaugural
Colin Suggett	Player		England				2003
Daryl Sutch	Player		England				2003
Chris Sutton	Player		England				2003
Bryan Thurlow	Player		England				2003
Andy Townsend	Player	1988–1990	Republic of Ireland				2003
Arthur Turner	Manager	1909–1910	England				2009
Percy Varco	Player		England				Inaugural
Jack Vinall	Player	1933–1937	England				Inaugural
Mike Walker	Manager	1992–1994; 1996–1998	Wales				2003
Geoffrey Watling	Board	1957–1973; 1996	England				Inaugural
Dave Watson	Player	1980–1986	England				2003
David Williams	Player; Coach	1985–1992	Wales				2003
Chris Woods	Player	1981–1986	England				2003
Nigel Worthington	Manager	2000–2006	Northern Ireland				2003
Michael Wynn-Jones	Board	?–current	England				2003
Bob Young	Manager	1937–1938; 1939–1945	England				2009

== Members by position ==
Position	Number of members
Player	94
Manager	15
Coach	2
Board	5
Executive	3
Physio	1
Other	1

== Members by nationality ==
Nationality	Number of inductees
Canada	1
England	91
Republic of Ireland	3
Montserrat	1
Nigeria	1
Northern Ireland	5
South Africa	1
Scotland	16
Wales	6
