= Bernard Robinson =

Bernard Robinson may refer to:

- Bernard Robinson (amateur musician) (1904–1997), English physicist and amateur musician, founder of Music Camp
- Bernard Robinson (footballer) (1911–2004), English professional football player
- Bernard Robinson (production designer) (1912–1970), English set designer
- Bernard Robinson (kickboxer) (born 1966), American kickboxer and Guinness World Record holder
- Bernard Robinson (basketball) (born 1980), American National Basketball Association player
