= Tom Halliday =

English footballer (1909–1975)

Personal information
- Full name: Thomas Halliday
- Date of birth: 11 September 1909
- Place of birth: Browney Colliery, County Durham, England
- Date of death: 1975 (aged 65–66)
- Height: 5 ft 9 1/2 in (1.77 m)
- Positions: Defender; wing half

Youth career
- Browney Juniors

Senior career*
Years	Team	Apps	(Gls)
- Esh Winning
- Meadowfield
1927–1928	Sunderland	0	(0)
1928–1933	Darlington	118	(2)
1933–1939	Norwich City	191	(0)
1939	Exeter City	14	(0)
- * Club domestic league appearances and goals

Thomas Halliday (11 September 1909 – 1975) was an English footballer who made 313 appearances in the Football League playing for Darlington, Norwich City and Exeter City in the 1920s and 1930s. He played non-league football in the north-east of England before joining First Division club Sunderland, but never played first-team football for that club. His primary position was that of centre half, although he also played at right back or right half.

== Life and career ==
Halliday was born in Browney Colliery, in County Durham. As a schoolboy, he played three times for Durham Schools under-15 team in the 1923–24 season, and captained England Schoolboys against Wales in Cardiff. He played for non-league teams in his local area, and captained Durham Amateurs before turning professional. He spent the 1927–28 season with First Division club Sunderland, but never appeared for the first team, and joined Third Division North club Darlington in 1928 as an 18-year-old.

He established himself in the starting eleven, and despite his youth, captained the team for three years. In the 1932–33 season, Halliday made 41 out of a possible 42 appearances in the league, taking his total to 127 in senior competition. In May 1933, he and Darlington teammates Harry Brown, Billy Eden and Fred Hopkinson were members of the Rest of Durham XI that faced Sunderland in a match to celebrate the silver jubilee of the Durham County Football Association. Darlington had finished bottom of the Northern Section, so had to apply for re-election. Although their application was successful, Halliday left the club.

He moved into the Southern Section of the Third Division with Norwich City, where he became a regular in the side. He made 40 appearances as Norwich won the divisional title and with it promotion to the Second Division for the first time in the club's history. Based on Norwich's recruitment of Exeter City's Harold Houghton, the Manchester Guardian suggested that the club "realise[d] the worth of a footballer of experience and anticipation in such a struggle", and went on to list "other players of this stamp", including "Halliday, a rare centre-half". In his review of the season, the Observer's J.A.H. Catton, praised Norwich's forwards, and thought that "of all the capital players behind the front line, Thomas Halliday, a centre half-back formerly of Darlington, must be highly commended."

Halliday took over the captaincy from Stan Ramsay during the next season. He remained with Norwich for six and a half years, making the last of his 203 appearances for the club on 27 December 1938 in a 4–0 defeat away to Newcastle United, and finished the season with Exeter City in the Third Division South.

In recognition of his contribution to Norwich City, Halliday was elected to the club's Hall of Fame. He died in 1975, aged 65 or 66.
