= List of EFL Cup–winning managers =

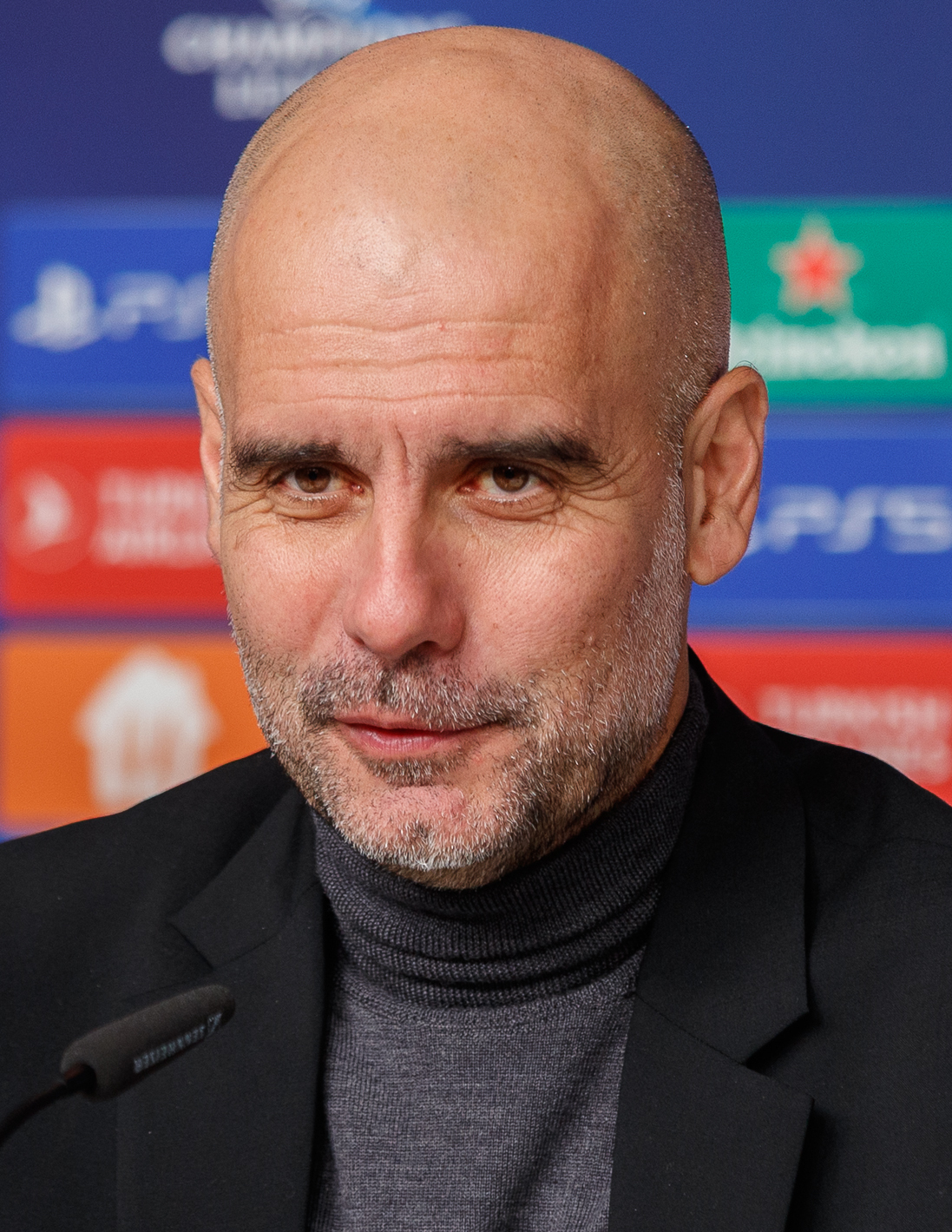
Pep Guardiola has won the most EFL Cups as a manager, with five victories.

The EFL Cup, previously known as the Football League Cup, is an association football competition contested between English clubs since 1960. It is open to teams from the top four levels of the English football league system, comprising teams from the Premier League, Championship, League One and League Two. The EFL Cup is considered to be less prestigious than the FA Cup, and clubs from the Premier League often use the competition as an opportunity to play younger players and lesser-used squad players. It is practice for club managers to rest first-team players and play reserve players for the competition matches.

Pep Guardiola has won five EFL Cups as manager of Manchester City, the most of any manager. He is also the manager who was won the most consecutive times, with four victories from 2018 to 2021. Brian Clough and Alex Ferguson won four EFL Cups as managers of Nottingham Forest and Manchester United respectively, while José Mourinho won four EFL Cups, three as manager of Chelsea, and one as manager of Manchester United. Four managers have won the League Cup as a player and manager, Martin O'Neill, Gianluca Vialli, Graeme Souness and Kenny Dalglish. Vialli won the competition as player-manager in 1998 with Chelsea.

English managers have won the competition the most, with 31 wins by 23 different managers. Scottish managers are next with 31 wins by 8 different managers and Spanish managers are third with six wins by two different managers. Eddie Howe was the last English manager to win the EFL Cup, when he led Newcastle United to victory in 2025.

== EFL Cup–winning managers ==
EFL Cup-winning managers
Year	Winning manager	Nationality	Club	Ref.
1961	Joe Mercer	England	Aston Villa	
1962	Willie Reed	Scotland	Norwich City	
1963	Gil Merrick	England	Birmingham City	
1964	Matt Gillies	Scotland	Leicester City	
1965	Tommy Docherty	Scotland	Chelsea	
1966	Jimmy Hagan	England	West Bromwich Albion	
1967	Alec Stock	England	Queen's Park Rangers	
1968	Don Revie	England	Leeds United	
1969	Danny Williams	England	Swindon Town	
1970	Joe Mercer	England	Manchester City	
1971	Bill Nicholson	England	Tottenham Hotspur	
1972	Tony Waddington	England	Stoke City	
1973	Bill Nicholson	England	Tottenham Hotspur	
1974	Bill McGarry	England	Wolverhampton Wanderers	
1975	Ron Saunders	England	Aston Villa	
1976	Tony Book	England	Manchester City	
1977	Ron Saunders	England	Aston Villa	
1978	Brian Clough	England	Nottingham Forest	
1979	Brian Clough	England	Nottingham Forest	
1980	John Barnwell	England	Wolverhampton Wanderers	
1981	Bob Paisley	England	Liverpool	
1982	Bob Paisley	England	Liverpool	
1983	Bob Paisley	England	Liverpool	
1984	Joe Fagan	England	Liverpool	
1985	Ken Brown	England	Norwich City	
1986	Maurice Evans	England	Oxford United	
1987	George Graham	Scotland	Arsenal	
1988	Ray Harford	England	Luton Town	
1989	Brian Clough	England	Nottingham Forest	
1990	Brian Clough	England	Nottingham Forest	
1992	Alex Ferguson	Scotland	Manchester United	
1993	George Graham	Scotland	Arsenal	
1994	Ron Atkinson	England	Aston Villa	
1995	Roy Evans	England	Liverpool	
1996	Brian Little	England	Aston Villa	
1997	Martin O'Neill	Northern Ireland	Leicester City	
1998	Gianluca Vialli	Italy	Chelsea	
1999	George Graham	Scotland	Tottenham Hotspur	
2000	Martin O'Neill	Northern Ireland	Leicester City	
2001	Gérard Houllier	France	Liverpool	
2002	Graeme Souness	Scotland	Blackburn Rovers	
2003	Gérard Houllier	France	Liverpool	
2004	Steve McClaren	England	Middlesbrough	
2005	José Mourinho	Portugal	Chelsea	
2006	Alex Ferguson	Scotland	Manchester United	
2007	José Mourinho	Portugal	Chelsea	
2008	Juande Ramos	Spain	Tottenham Hotspur	
2009	Alex Ferguson	Scotland	Manchester United	
2010	Alex Ferguson	Scotland	Manchester United	
2011	Alex McLeish	Scotland	Birmingham City	
2012	Kenny Dalglish	Scotland	Liverpool	
2013	Michael Laudrup	Denmark	Swansea City	
2014	Manuel Pellegrini	Chile	Manchester City	
2015	José Mourinho	Portugal	Chelsea	
2016	Manuel Pellegrini	Chile	Manchester City	
2017	José Mourinho	Portugal	Manchester United	
2018	Pep Guardiola	Spain	Manchester City	
2019	Pep Guardiola	Spain	Manchester City	
2020	Pep Guardiola	Spain	Manchester City	
2021	Pep Guardiola	Spain	Manchester City	
2022	Jürgen Klopp	Germany	Liverpool	
2023	Erik ten Hag	Netherlands	Manchester United	
2024	Jürgen Klopp	Germany	Liverpool	
2025	Eddie Howe	England	Newcastle United	
2026	Pep Guardiola	Spain	Manchester City	

=== By individual ===
EFL Cup-winning managers by individual
Rank	Manager	Nationality	Wins	Winning Years	Club(s)
1	Pep Guardiola	Spain	5	2018, 2019, 2020, 2021, 2026	Manchester City
2	Brian Clough	England	4	1978, 1979, 1989, 1990	Nottingham Forest
2	Alex Ferguson	Scotland	4	1992, 2006, 2009, 2010	Manchester United
2	José Mourinho	Portugal	4	2005, 2007, 2015, 2017	Chelsea, Manchester United
5	Bob Paisley	England	3	1981, 1982, 1983	Liverpool
5	George Graham	Scotland	3	1987, 1993, 1999	Arsenal, Tottenham Hotspur
7	Joe Mercer	England	2	1961, 1970	Aston Villa, Manchester City
7	Bill Nicholson	England	2	1971, 1973	Tottenham Hotspur
7	Ron Saunders	England	2	1975, 1977	Aston Villa
7	Martin O'Neill	Northern Ireland	2	1997, 2000	Leicester City
7	Gérard Houllier	France	2	2000, 2003	Liverpool
7	Manuel Pellegrini	Chile	2	2014, 2016	Manchester City
7	Jurgen Klopp	Germany	2	2022, 2024	Liverpool

=== By nationality ===
EFL Cup-winning managers by nationality
Country	Managers	Total
England	23	31
Scotland	8	31
Spain	2	6
Portugal	1	4
Northern Ireland	1	2
France	1	2
Chile	1	2
Germany	1	2
Italy	1	1
Denmark	1	1
Netherlands	1	1
