= Ray Aspden =

English footballer (1938–2021)

Personal information
- Full name: John Raymond Aspden
- Date of birth: 6 February 1938
- Place of birth: Horwich, England
- Date of death: 24 August 2021 (aged 83)
- Position: Centre half

Youth career
- Bolton Wanderers

Senior career*
Years	Team	Apps	(Gls)
1955–1966	Rochdale	297	(2)
Total		297	(2)
- * Club domestic league appearances and goals

John Raymond Aspden (6 February 1938 – 24 August 2021) was an English professional footballer, who played as a centre half.

== Career ==
Born in Horwich, Aspden played for Bolton Wanderers and Rochdale. He played for Rochdale in the 1962 Football League Cup Final.

== Death ==
Aspen died on 24 August 2021.

== Honours ==
Rochdale

- Football League Cup runner-up: 1961–62
