= Norman Bodell =

English footballer (1938–2024)

Personal information
- Full name: Norman Bodell
- Date of birth: 29 January 1938
- Place of birth: Manchester, Lancashire, England
- Date of death: 22 November 2024 (aged 86)
- Position: Defender

Senior career*
Years	Team	Apps	(Gls)
1958–1963	Rochdale	79	(1)
1963–1967	Crewe Alexandra	109	(2)
1967–1968	Halifax Town	36	(0)
1968–1969	Altrincham		

Managerial career
- 1969–1970: Barrow
- 1978: Blackburn Rovers (caretaker manager)
- 1982: Birmingham City (caretaker manager)
- * Club domestic league appearances and goals

Norman Bodell (29 January 1938 – 22 November 2024) was an English professional footballer, coach, manager and scout. He played as a defender, making 224 appearances in the Football League for Rochdale, Crewe Alexandra and Halifax Town before moving into non-League football with Altrincham. He played for Rochdale in the final of the 1961–62 League Cup which they lost to Norwich City.

== Life and career ==
Bodell was born in Manchester on 29 January 1938. He joined Rochdale as an amateur in 1955 and turned professional in 1956. After completing his National Service requirements with the British Army of the Rhine in 1958, Bodell made his senior debut on 7 February 1959 at home to Norwich City in the Football League Third Division. Normally a centre forward, he played in an unfamiliar wing-half position in a Rochdale side disrupted by illness; they lost 2–1, and fell to the foot of the table. Rochdale were relegated at the end of the season, and Bodell stayed for another four years in Division Four, mainly as a wing-half. In the 1961–62 season, he helped Rochdale reach and played in both legs of the League Cup final which they lost to Norwich City.

Bodell played only four times in 1962–63, having signed month-by-month contracts because of a dispute over terms, and signed for Crewe Alexandra, about to gain promotion to the Third Division, in May 1963. Bodell played more regularly for Crewe over the next three seasons, but moved on to Fourth Division club Halifax Town in October 1967, where he was appointed captain and played almost exclusively at left back, a position he had occupied from time to time at his previous clubs.

Bodell left Northern Premier League club Altrincham, where his playing career ended because of knee ligament damage but where he had continued as coach, to become manager of Barrow in March 1969. He helped them avoid relegation that season, but was sacked the following February with the team heading back down to the Fourth Division. He went on to coach the reserve team at Wolverhampton Wanderers and the first team at Preston North End under Bobby Charlton's management before becoming Jim Smith's assistant at Blackburn Rovers in July 1975. When Smith left Blackburn for Birmingham City in March 1978, Bodell acted as caretaker manager for eight games until Jim Iley was appointed, and then rejoined Smith at Birmingham. This situation was repeated four years later when Smith's dismissal in February 1982 left Bodell as caretaker for two matches until the appointment of Ron Saunders. Bodell remained at Birmingham as coach and as chief scout, a post he went on to hold at West Bromwich Albion.

Bodell died on 22 November 2024 at the age of 86.

== Honours ==
Rochdale

- Football League Cup runner-up: 1961–62
