= Isaac Martin =

Isaac Martin may refer to:

- Isaac George Martin (1889–1962)
- Isaac Jack Martin (1908–1966), judge of the United States Court of Customs and Patent Appeals
- Isaac Martin (died 1793), participant in the mutiny on the Bounty
- Ike Martin (1887–?), footballer
