= Don Pickwick =

Welsh footballer

Donald Pickwick (7 February 1925 – 2 April 2004) is a former footballer and a member of the Norwich City Hall of Fame.

Welsh-born Pickwick made 244 appearances for Norwich as a right-half between 1947 and 1956, scoring eleven times.

A contemporary of other Norwich Hall of Fame players Reg Foulkes, Ron Ashman and Roy Hollis, Pickwick was a loyal Norwich servant, to the extent that he appeared in a match versus Colchester United F.C. on his wedding day in 1951.

In 1951, Norwich recorded their greatest league victory, an 8-1 success over Shrewsbury Town F.C. Pickwick experienced mixed emotions; he broke his leg and missed the rest of the season.
