= Tony Collins (footballer) =

English footballer, manager, and scout (1926–2021)

Personal information
- Full name: Anthony Norman Collins
- Date of birth: 19 March 1926
- Place of birth: Kensington, London, England
- Date of death: 8 February 2021 (aged 94)
- Height: 5 ft 9 in (1.75 m)
- Position: Left winger

Senior career*
Years	Team	Apps	(Gls)
- Acton United
1947–1949	Sheffield Wednesday	0	(0)
1949–1950	York City	10	(1)
1950–1953	Watford	90	(8)
1953–1955	Norwich City	29	(2)
1955–1957	Torquay United	89	(17)
1957	Watford	17	(1)
1957–1959	Crystal Palace	55	(14)
1959–1961	Rochdale	47	(5)
Total		333	(47)

Managerial career
- 1960–1967: Rochdale
- 1980: Bristol City (caretaker)
- * Club domestic league appearances and goals

Anthony Norman Collins (19 March 1926 – 8 February 2021) was an English football player, manager and scout, who played as a left winger. He managed Rochdale between 1960 and 1967, becoming the first black manager in the Football League and leading them to the 1962 Football League Cup Final, their only major final appearance.

Collins played professionally for Sheffield Wednesday, York City, Watford (in two spells), Norwich City, Torquay United and Crystal Palace (where he was the club's first mixed-race player), before ending his playing career at Rochdale. Apart from a spell as assistant manager (and briefly caretaker manager) at Bristol City, he latterly worked mainly in scouting for a number of clubs, including Leeds United and Manchester United, as well as for the England national team.

== Early life ==
Tony Collins was born in Kensington, London, on 19 March 1926 to a 17-year-old unmarried white mother. His father, who was black, was not named on the birth certificate. Collins was adopted by his maternal grandparents and grew up in the Portobello Road area. A promising schoolboy footballer, he played for local club Acton United and was due to sign for Brentford until he was called up for military service during the Second World War.

== Playing career ==
During his three years of wartime service stationed in Padua, Italy, Collins was spotted in Army football matches and recommended to Sheffield Wednesday. After being demobbed and returning to England, he signed for Wednesday in November 1947, but did not make any first team appearances. He made his Football League debut for York City in the Third Division North after joining them in July 1949, and was then transferred to Watford in August 1950. While at Watford, Collins was linked with a representative call-up after being watched by a selector from The Football Association, and the club chairman was quoted as saying in response to transfer speculation, "£12,000 won't buy him."

After Watford, Collins joined Norwich City in 1953 and then Torquay United in 1955. He briefly returned to Watford in 1957 before signing for Crystal Palace later that year; he was the first black player to appear for Palace. He joined his final club as a player, Rochdale, in June 1959. In total, Collins made 333 Football League appearances, scoring 47 goals, before retiring in 1961.

Collins has the distinction of having been the first Black footballer at several of the clubs he played for in the Football League: Watford (debut, 21 October 1950); Norwich City (debut, 19 August 1953); and Crystal Palace (debut, 23 November 1957). He is also likely to have been the first Black player to represent Torquay United for whom he played in 1955–1957.

== Management and scouting career ==
At the end of Collins' first season at Rochdale, manager Jack Marshall left the club to join Blackburn Rovers. After being encouraged by his teammates to apply for the post, Collins was appointed player-manager of the Fourth Division club in June 1960. He was the first non-white manager of a Football League club. He retired from playing to become a full-time manager in September 1961.

In his second season, Rochdale reached the League Cup Final, only to lose 4–0 on aggregate to Second Division Norwich City. As of 2019, it remains the club's only appearance in a major final, and one of only two EFL Cup final appearances by a fourth-tier side. Despite this achievement, Collins failed to attract interest in his services from larger clubs. Gradually tiring of the demands the job placed on his time and family life, he resigned in September 1967.

After leaving Rochdale, Collins worked as assistant manager and scout for Bristol City, and then chief scout at Leeds United. When Leeds manager Don Revie became manager of the England national team, Collins worked with him compiling dossiers on opponents; the press dubbed Collins "Football's Superspy" when one was leaked to the press before a match against Scotland. He had second spells at both Bristol Rovers and Leeds United. He served Manchester United in a similar capacity from 1982 to 1988, helping the club to find future stars including Paul McGrath and Lee Sharpe. Before retiring, Collins also scouted for Queens Park Rangers, Newcastle United, Millwall and Derby County. He retired at the age of 80.

== Legacy ==
Keith Alexander, who became Lincoln City manager in 1993, was often described as the first black manager in the Football League, until Tony Collins' achievements became more widely recognised. Although non-white players were a rarity in English football during his era, contemporary reports made few references to his colour, and Collins himself said he was not affected by prejudice. His appointment at Rochdale also attracted little attention at the time, save for one report which described the new manager as "a coloured boy" and quoted the club chairman as saying that Collins' colour was not an issue in choosing him.

The historical significance of Collins' appointment became more widely reported in 2016 as a result of the publication of Tony Collins: Football Master Spy, a biography co-authored by his daughter. This led to Collins, by then 90 years old and living in a care home in Moston, Manchester, to be interviewed by BBC North West Tonight and ITV News about his life and career. He received the Service to Football Award at the 2017 League Managers Association Awards.

Collins died on 8 February 2021, aged 94. Howard Wilkinson, chairman of the League Managers Association, described him as "a true pioneer of the sport".

== Personal life ==
Collins was married with three children.

== Management record ==
Club	From	To	P	W	D	L	Win %
Rochdale	1 June 1960	30 September 1967	365	132	84	149	36.16

== Honours ==
Rochdale

- Football League Cup runner-up: 1961–62
