= Edward Burgin =

Edward Burgin may refer to

- Leslie Burgin (Edward Leslie Burgin, 1887-1945), British politician
- Ted Burgin (1927-2019), English footballer
