= Peter Whyke =

English footballer (born 1939)

Personal information
- Date of birth: 7 September 1939 (age 87)
- Place of birth: Barnsley, England
- Position: Right winger

Senior career*
Years	Team	Apps	(Gls)
- Smithies United
1958–1961	Barnsley	26	(1)
1961–1962	Rochdale	5	(0)
- Scarborough
Total		31	(1)
- * Club domestic league appearances and goals

Peter Whyke (born 7 September 1939) is an English former professional footballer who played as a right winger.

== Career ==
Born in Barnsley, Whyke played for Smithies United, Barnsley, Rochdale and Scarborough. He played for Rochdale in the 1962 Football League Cup final.

== Honours ==
Rochdale

- Football League Cup runner-up: 1961–62
