= Black managers in English football =

There have been black managers in English football since 1960 when Tony Collins was appointed by Rochdale. Though Collins was manager from 1960 to 1967 and reached the 1962 Football League Cup final, he was overlooked for many years and Keith Alexander at Lincoln City in 1993 was believed to be the first black manager in the country.

An article in The Independent in 2018 found that a quarter of retired England internationals since 1990 had been black, though only one seventh of those had gone into management. Of those five individuals, one was still working in 2018 and only one had managed in the Premier League, for under a year.

== History ==
=== Background and players ===
Pioneering black players in early English football history include Gold Coast (Ghana)-born Arthur Wharton who was the first black professional in the 1880s, and former Tottenham Hotspur player Walter Tull who was killed in World War I where he was the first black commander in the British Army to command white troops. Plymouth Argyle forward Jack Leslie was due to become the first black international for England in 1925 but was suddenly dropped, ostensibly because selectors discovered his skin colour.

Modern immigration to the United Kingdom increased the number of black people in the country and in football. In 1978, Viv Anderson was the first black man to be capped by the senior England team, and in 1993 Paul Ince was its first black captain.

=== Managerial history ===
In 1960, Tony Collins was appointed by Rochdale. He was the first black manager in English history, and took the Football League Fourth Division team to the 1962 Football League Cup final, where they lost 4–0 on aggregate to Norwich City. After leaving in 1967, he remained in the game as a scout for Leeds United and Manchester United.

Keith Alexander was appointed by Lincoln City in 1993. He died in 2010 while managing Macclesfield Town, and was mistakenly reported at the time to have been English football's first black manager. Dutchman Ruud Gullit was the first top-flight black manager with Chelsea in 1995, and the first to win the FA Cup in 1997.

In June 2008, Paul Ince became the first black English manager in the Premier League, taking over at Blackburn Rovers after his spell at Milton Keynes Dons. He was sacked in December. As of November 2021, ten black people had managed in the Premier League, two of whom only as caretaker managers.

When Sol Campbell was appointed at Macclesfield Town in 2018, eight out of 92 managerial positions in England's top four divisions were held by black people, while 18 months earlier it had been two of 92. Campbell was only the sixth black former England international to start a managerial career, and according to the League Managers Association, two thirds of black managers in the league never got a second club.

== List of black managers ==
The following is a list of black managers in the top four divisions of English football, the Premier League and the three divisions of the English Football League. For clubs in bold, the manager was in charge while the club was in the Premier League. All managers are English by sporting nationality, unless otherwise indicated. Since its establishment in the 1992–93 season, the Premier League has twelve Black managers or caretaker managers.

- (Saint Lucia) Keith Alexander: Lincoln City (1993–1994, 2002–2006), Peterborough United (2006–2007), Macclesfield Town (2008–2010)
- Sol Campbell: Macclesfield Town (2018–2019), Southend United (2019–2020)
- Tony Collins: Rochdale (1960–1967), Bristol City (caretaker, 1980)
- Terry Connor: **Wolverhampton Wanderers** (2012)
- (Wales) Danny Gabbidon: Cardiff City (caretaker, 2014)
- Lee Grant: Walsall (2026)
- (Netherlands) Ruud Gullit: **Chelsea** (1996–1998), **Newcastle United** (1998–1999)
- (Netherlands) Jimmy Floyd Hasselbaink: Burton Albion (2014–2015, 2021–2022), Queens Park Rangers (2015–2016), Northampton Town (2017–2018)
- (Republic of Ireland) Chris Hughton: **Tottenham Hotspur** (caretaker 1997, 1998), **Newcastle United** (caretaker 2008; 2010), Birmingham City (2011–2012), **Norwich City** (2012–2014), **Brighton & Hove Albion** (2014–2019), **Nottingham Forest** (2020–2021)
- Paul Ince: Macclesfield Town (2006–2007), Milton Keynes Dons (2007–2008, 2009–2010), **Blackburn Rovers** (2008), Notts County (2010–2011), Blackpool (2013–2014), Reading (2022–2023)
- (Belgium) Vincent Kompany: **Burnley** (2022–2024)
- (Italy) Fabio Liverani: Leyton Orient (2014–2015)
- (Jamaica) Darren Moore: **West Bromwich Albion** (2018–2019), Doncaster Rovers (2019–2021), Sheffield Wednesday (2021–2023), Huddersfield Town (2023–2024), Port Vale (2024–2025)
- Hayden Mullins: **Watford** (caretaker, 2019, 2020), Colchester United (2021–2022)
- Chris Powell: Leicester City (caretaker, 2010), Charlton Athletic (2011–2014), Huddersfield Town (2014–2015), Derby County (caretaker, 2016), Southend United (2018–2019)
- Chris Ramsey: **Queens Park Rangers** (2015)
- (Sierra Leone) Leroy Rosenior: Torquay United (2002–2006), Brentford (2006)
- Liam Rosenior: Derby County (2022), Hull City (2022–2024), **Chelsea** (2026)
- (Portugal) Nuno Espírito Santo: **Wolverhampton Wanderers** (2017–2021), **Tottenham Hotspur** (2021), **Nottingham Forest** (2023–2025), **West Ham United** (2025–)
- (France) Jean Tigana: **Fulham** (2000–2003)
- (France) Patrick Vieira: **Crystal Palace** (2021–2023)
