= Joe Hannah =

English footballer

Personal information
- Date of birth: November 30, 1898
- Date of death: February 1, 1975 (aged 76)
- Height: 5 ft 9 in (1.75 m)
- Position: Defender

Senior career*
Years	Team	Apps	(Gls)
1921–1935	Norwich City		
- * Club domestic league appearances and goals

Joe Hannah (30 November 1898 – 1 February 1975) was a footballer and a member of the Norwich City Hall of Fame.

Hannah made 427 appearances for Norwich as a centre-half and full-back between 1921 and 1935, scoring 21 times. He stood 5 ft 9 in (1.75 m) tall.

Hannah is in fifth place in the list of all-time appearances for Norwich City. (See List of Norwich City F.C. club records) "Legend has it that Hannah was once so annoyed with his performance, he walked home from Norwich to Sheringham as a punishment."

After completing his football career, he worked as the Steward at The Morley Club in Sheringham until his retirement.
