= Doug Winton =

Scottish footballer

Personal information
- Full name: George Douglas Winton
- Date of birth: 6 October 1929
- Place of birth: Perth, Scotland
- Date of death: 29 October 2006 (aged 77)
- Place of death: Burnley, England
- Position: Full back

Senior career*
Years	Team	Apps	(Gls)
1951–1959	Burnley	183	(1)
1959–1961	Aston Villa	37	(0)
1961–1964	Rochdale	119	(0)
Total		339	(1)

International career
1957	Scotland B	1	(0)
- * Club domestic league appearances and goals

George Douglas Winton (6 October 1929 – 29 October 2006) was a Scottish professional footballer who played as a defender. He played a total of well over 300 matches in the Football League for three clubs, but scored just one senior goal, whilst playing for Burnley.

== Honours ==
Rochdale

- Football League Cup runner-up: 1961–62
