= Derrick Lythgoe =

English footballer

Personal information
- Date of birth: 5 May 1933
- Place of birth: Bolton, England
- Date of death: 30 December 2012 (aged 79)
- Position: Forward

Senior career*
| Years | Team | Apps | (Gls) |
| 1955–1957 | Blackpool | 4 | (1) |
| 1958–1962 | Norwich City | 62 | (22) |
| 1962–1964 | Bristol City | 13 | (2) |
- King's Lynn
| Total | | 79 | (25) |
- * Club domestic league appearances and goals

Derrick Lythgoe (5 May 1933 – 30 December 2012) was an English footballer who played in the Football League for Blackpool, Bristol City and Norwich City. He scored twice in the 1962 Football League Cup final.

== Honours ==
Norwich City

- Football League Cup: 1961–62
