= Jack Vinall =

English footballer and manager

Jack Vinall (16 December 1910 – 26 May 1997) was a footballer and a member of the Norwich City Hall of Fame.

Birmingham-born Vinall made 181 appearances for Norwich as a centre-forward between 1933 and 1937, scoring 80 times. (see List of Norwich City F.C. club records)

After signing from Sunderland, Vinall scored four goals in his second match for Norwich and went on to play every game of the 1933–34 season, as Norwich won promotion from Division Three (South) for the first time.
