= Gerry Mannion =

English footballer

Personal information
- Full name: Gerard Patrick Mannion
- Date of birth: 21 December 1939
- Place of birth: Burtonwood, Warrington, England
- Date of death: 15 June 1994 (aged 54)
- Place of death: Cheshire, England
- Position: Winger

Youth career
- Wolverhampton Wanderers

Senior career*
Years	Team	Apps	(Gls)
1957–1961	Wolverhampton Wanderers	17	(7)
1961–1968	Norwich City	100	(17)
1968	Chester	6	(0)
Total		123	(24)

International career
1960	England U23	2	(1)
- * Club domestic league appearances and goals

Gerard Patrick Mannion (21 December 1939 – 15 June 1994) was an English footballer, who played in the Football League for Wolverhampton Wanderers, Norwich City and Chester.

== Career ==
Mannion joined First Division Wolverhampton Wanderers as a youngster, signing professional forms in November 1957. He spent his early professional days in the reserves before finally making his senior debut in the 1958 Charity Shield where Wolves went down 4–1 at Bolton Wanderers.

The 1959–60 season saw his strongest run of games in a Wolves shirt as he made 10 consecutive appearances in the final run-in. Despite scoring six times in this spell, the club lost out on a third successive league title by a single point to Burnley, denying them a domestic double.

He was limited to just 21 appearances in total for the Molineux club, largely due to the presence of Norman Deeley on the wing. With playing opportunities limited, he moved to Norwich City in September 1961, for £13,000.

Mannion made 100 league appearances for the Canaries in six and a half years in the Second Division. He scored 17 league goals for the club and played in both legs of their 1962 League Cup triumph. The winger eventually left to join Chester in January 1968 but spent just five months there before dropping into the non-League with Kidderminster Harriers.

He died on 15 June 1994, aged 54.

== Honours ==
Norwich City

- Football League Cup: 1961–62
