= Joseph Nutchey =

English schoolmaster and football club founder

Joseph Cowper Nutchey (1865 – 15 February 1931) was a Norwich schoolmaster regarded as the founder of Norwich City F.C.

Nutchey was born in Kirkby Wharfe, Yorkshire, in autumn 1865 and baptised on 19 November 1865.

The club was established following a 1902 public meeting that Nutchey organised with the assistance of fellow-teacher Robert Webster. In recognition of Nutchey's role, he was made an inaugural member of the Norwich City Hall of Fame.

== See also ==
- History of Norwich City F.C.
