= Joe Mullett =

English footballer

Personal information
- Full name: Joseph Mullett
- Date of birth: 2 October 1936
- Place of birth: Halesowen, England
- Date of death: 1995 (aged 58–59)
- Place of death: Cradley Heath, England
- Positions: Wing half; full back

Youth career
- Malt Mill United

Senior career*
Years	Team	Apps	(Gls)
1955–1959	Birmingham City	3	(0)
1959–1968	Norwich City	213	(2)
1968–1970	King's Lynn		
1970–1971	Lowestoft Town		
1971–197?	Yarmouth Town		
Total		216	(2)
- * Club domestic league appearances and goals

Joseph Mullett (2 October 1936 – 1995) was an English professional footballer who made 216 appearances in the Football League playing for Birmingham City and Norwich City.

== Career ==
Mullett was born in Halesowen, which was then in Worcestershire. He joined Birmingham City in 1955, and soon after he completed his National Service he made his first-team debut. This came in the First Division on 11 September 1957 in a home game against Tottenham Hotspur which finished goalless; Mullett played at left half to allow Dick Neal to stand in for Peter Murphy at inside left. He kept his place for three games in Murphy's absence, but those were the only first-team games he played for Birmingham, and in February 1959, Norwich City paid £2,000 for his services. At Norwich he was converted to play at full back, went on to make 213 Football League appearances for the club, and helped them to win the 1962 League Cup. He spent nearly ten years with Norwich, before finishing off his career in non-league football in the East Anglia area.

Mullett died in Cradley Heath, West Midlands, in 1995.

== Honours ==
Norwich City

- Football League Cup: 1961–62
