= Ted Burgin =

English footballer (1927–2019)

Personal information
- Full name: Edward Burgin
- Date of birth: 29 April 1927
- Place of birth: Bradfield, England
- Date of death: 26 March 2019 (aged 91)
- Height: 5 ft 7 in (1.70 m) (Note: While Burgin's DoncasterRovers.co.uk profile says he was 5 ft 7 in (1.70 m) tall, other sources suggest 5 ft 9 in (1.75 m).)
- Position: Goalkeeper

Senior career*
Years	Team	Apps	(Gls)
–1949	Alford Town		
1949–1957	Sheffield United	281	(0)
1957–1958	Doncaster Rovers	5	(0)
1958–1961	Leeds United	58	(0)
1961–1966	Rochdale	207	(0)
- Glossop
Total		551	(0)

International career
1954	England B	2	(0)

Managerial career
- 1966–19??: Glossop (player-manager)
- * Club domestic league appearances and goals

Edward Burgin (29 April 1927 – 26 March 2019) was an English professional footballer who played 551 times in the Football League as a goalkeeper for Sheffield United, Doncaster Rovers, Leeds United and Rochdale. He played twice for England B, and was a non-playing member of England's squad for the 1954 World Cup.

== Career ==
Burgin started his career with Alford Town. Following a trial he signed for Sheffield United in March 1949. His debut came in a Second Division game against Swansea Town on 1 September 1949, and despite being only 5 ft 7 in (1.70 m) tall,^{[A]} his agility kept him in the side for nearly eight seasons. He was ever-present during three 3 League seasons: 1950–51, 1952–53 and 1953–54, and between 12 November 1949 and 15 March 1952 made 102 consecutive league appearances.

After 314 appearances for United, including 281 League games and 20 FA Cup ties, he moved to Doncaster Rovers for a £3,000 fee, as replacement for Harry Gregg who had joined Manchester United. After only five first-team games, he broke his collarbone. In 1958, he joined Leeds United making 58 league appearances for the West Yorkshire side. In 1960, he joined Rochdale, where he spent six seasons, making 207 league appearances and playing in the 1962 Football League Cup Final. He went on to be player-manager of Glossop.

During his time with Sheffield United, Burgin was regarded as one of the best goalkeepers in the country. He toured Australia with the Football Association's team in 1951, was a reserve for England's match with Austria in 1951, won two caps for England B in 1954 and was selected in England's squad for the 1954 World Cup, although he did not feature in any of their matches.

== Career statistics ==
Appearances and goals by club, season and competition
Club	Season	League			FA Cup		League Cup		Other (Note: Appearance(s) in Sheffield & Hallamshire County Cup)		Total	
Club	Season	Division	Apps	Goals	Apps	Goals	Apps	Goals	Apps	Goals	Apps	Goals
Sheffield United	1949–50	Division Two	30	0	3	0	—		2	0	35	0
Sheffield United	1950–51	Division Two	42	0	3	0	—		1	0	46	0
Sheffield United	1951–52	Division Two	39	0	4	0	—		2	0	45	0
Sheffield United	1952–53	Division Two	42	0	3	0	—		1	0	46	0
Sheffield United	1953–54	Division One	42	0	2	0	—		3	0	47	0
Sheffield United	1954–55	Division One	31	0	1	0	—		2	0	34	0
Sheffield United	1955–56	Division One	32	0	4	0	—		2	0	38	0
Sheffield United	1956–57	Division Two	23	0	0	0	—		0	0	23	0
Sheffield United	Total		281	0	20	0	—		13	0	314	0
Doncaster Rovers	1957–58	Division Two	5	0	0	0	—		—		5	0
Leeds United	1958–59	Division One	16	0	0	0	—		—		16	0
Leeds United	1959–60	Division One	32	0	0	0	—		—		32	0
Leeds United	1960–61	Division Two	10	0	0	0	1	0	—		11	0
Leeds United	Total		58	0	0	0	1	0	—		59	0
Rochdale	1960–61	Division Four	20	0	0	0	0	0	—		20	0
Rochdale	1961–62	Division Four	44	0	2	0	9	0	—		55	0
Rochdale	1962–63	Division Four	46	0	2	0	2	0	—		50	0
Rochdale	1963–64	Division Four	40	0	2	0	3	0	—		45	0
Rochdale	1964–65	Division Four	46	0	1	0	2	0	—		49	0
Rochdale	1965–66	Division Four	11	0	3	0	1	0	—		15	0
Rochdale	Total		207	0	10	0	17	0	—		234	0
Career total			551	0	30	0	18	0	13	0	612	0

== Honours ==
Rochdale

- Football League Cup runner-up: 1961–62
