= Bob Young (footballer, born 1894) =

English footballer and manager

Personal information
- Full name: Robert Thornton Young
- Date of birth: 18 February 1894
- Place of birth: Brandon, England
- Date of death: 8 October 1960 (aged 66)
- Place of death: Norwich, England
- Height: 5 ft 8 in (1.73 m)
- Position: Left back

Youth career
- 1910–1911: New Brancepeth Juniors

Senior career*
Years	Team	Apps	(Gls)
1911–1912	New Brancepeth Villa		
1912–1914	Esh Winning Rangers		
1914–1925	Sunderland	50	(0)
1926–1927	Norwich City	0	(0)

Managerial career
- 1937–1938: Norwich City
- 1939–1945: Norwich City
- * Club domestic league appearances and goals

Robert Thornton Young MM (18 February 1894 – 8 September 1960) was an English professional footballer and manager. After a Football League career as a left back with Sunderland that was interrupted by the First World War, he managed Norwich City in two spells and is a member of the club's Hall of Fame.

== Personal life ==
Young was married with two children. He served as a sergeant in the Durham Light Infantry during the First World War and was awarded the Military Medal in December 1916. After retiring from football management, he became a publican.

== Career statistics ==
=== Player ===
Appearances and goals by club, season and competition
Club	Season	League			FA Cup		Other		Total	
Club	Season	Division	Apps	Goals	Apps	Goals	Apps	Goals	Apps	Goals
Sunderland	1914–15	First Division	1	0	0	0	0	0	1	0
Sunderland	1919–20	First Division	24	0	4	0	0	0	28	0
Sunderland	1920–21	First Division	10	0	1	0	0	0	11	0
Sunderland	1921–22	First Division	8	0	0	0	0	0	8	0
Sunderland	1922–23	First Division	2	0	0	0	1 (Note: Appearance in Durham Challenge Cup)	0	3	0
Sunderland	1923–24	First Division	4	0	0	0	1	0	5	0
Sunderland	1924–25	First Division	1	0	1	0	1	0	3	0
Career total			50	0	6	0	3	0	59	0

=== Manager ===
Managerial record by team and tenure
Team	From	To	Record					Ref
Team	From	To	P	W	D	L	Win %	Ref
Norwich City	22 February 1937	21 January 1938	78	26	14	38	33.3	
Total			78	26	14	38	33.3	―

== Honours ==
Sunderland

- Durham Challenge Cup: 1922–23

Individual

- Norwich City Hall of Fame
