= Stan Ramsay =

English footballer and manager

Stanley Hunter Ramsay (10 August 1904 – 19 July 1989) was a footballer and a member of the Norwich City Hall of Fame.

Ryton-born Ramsay made 82 appearances for Norwich as a left-half and left-back between 1932 and 1934, scoring once (see List of Norwich City F.C. club records).

Before playing for Norwich, Ramsay appeared for Blackpool and Sunderland. He captained Norwich to the club's first-ever honour, the championship of Division Three (South) in 1934. After Ramsay left Norwich, he became player-manager of Shrewsbury Town.
