= Les Eyre =

English footballer

Personal information
- Full name: Ernest Leslie Eyre
- Date of birth: January 7, 1922
- Place of birth: Ilkeston, England
- Date of death: 19 November 1991 (aged 69)
- Place of death: Norwich, England
- Position: Inside forward

Youth career
- Cardiff City

Senior career*
Years	Team	Apps	(Gls)
1946–1951	Norwich City	185	(58)
1951–1953	Bournemouth & Boscombe Athletic	38	(10)
- Chelmsford City
- Bilsthorpe Colliery
- * Club domestic league appearances and goals

Les Eyre (7 January 1922 – 19 November 1991) was a footballer who was born in Ilkeston, Derbyshire, England and played for Norwich City.

== Career ==
Eyre played 201 times in all competitions for Norwich City, scoring 69 goals, between 1946 and 1951. His exploits as one of Norwich's all-time leading scorers (see List of Norwich City F.C. club records) won him a place as one of the fan nominees in the inaugural Norwich City Hall of Fame. In 1951, after leaving Norwich, Eyre joined Bournemouth & Boscombe Athletic, scoring 10 goals in 38 league games. Following this spell, Eyre dropped into non-league, playing for Chelmsford City and Bilsthorpe Colliery.
