= 1962 Football League Cup final =

- Event: 1961–62 Football League Cup
Rochdale	Norwich City
0	4
- on aggregate

First leg
Rochdale	Norwich City
0	3
- Date: 26 April 1962
- Venue: Spotland, Rochdale
- Referee: A. Holland (Barnsley)
- Attendance: 11,123

Second leg
Norwich City	Rochdale
1	0
- Date: 1 May 1962
- Venue: Carrow Road, Norwich
- Referee: R. Mann (Worcester)
- Attendance: 19,708

The 1962 Football League Cup final was won by Norwich City, who defeated Rochdale 4–0 on aggregate over two legs. The first leg, played on 26 April 1962 at Rochdale's ground, Spotland, was won by Norwich 3–0. They then won the second leg 1–0 a week later on 1 May 1962, at their own ground, Carrow Road. This was Norwich City's first major trophy. Rochdale remained for a long time the only club from the lowest division – Fourth Division, which was the equivalent of the current League Two – in English league football to reach the League Cup final, until the feat was repeated by Bradford City in 2013, after their aggregate 4–3 win over Aston Villa.

The captain of the winning Norwich City team was Ron Ashman.

Rochdale's manager Tony Collins became the first BAME manager to lead a team in a major English cup final.

== Route to the final ==
Second Division Norwich City were drawn away in the first round to Fourth Division Chesterfield, and what should have been an easy victory for The Canaries turned into a mighty battle at Saltergate, with Norwich eventually emerging as 3–2 victors. The reward was a home tie against Third Division Lincoln City at Carrow Road. Again, Norwich should have emerged as comfortable victors but ended up winning 3–2 again. A tougher tie awaited in the third round, against fellow Second Division side Middlesbrough at Carrow Road, and for the third consecutive match Norwich ran out 3–2 winners. This earned them a bye through the fourth round, and a quarter final tie away at Roker Park against Second Division Sunderland. For the first time in the tournament, they did not win 3–2, instead emerging as 4–1 victors in a much more decisive victory. In the two-legged semi-final they drew First Division Blackpool, with the first match held at Carrow Road. Norwich were again 4–1 victors, leaving them with margin for error when the tie returned to Bloomfield Road five days later, when they lost 2–0, just scraping through as 4–3 aggregate winners.

Fourth Division Rochdale, on the other hand, had started out travelling away to The Dell to play Southampton, a tie in which a draw would be considered a great result for The Dale. A draw was what they achieved in a hard-fought encounter which ended 0–0 and earned them a replay at Spotland. To the surprise of everyone, they triumphed 2–1. In the second round they played at home to fellow Fourth Division side Doncaster Rovers, who rarely challenged as Rochdale finished 4–0 winners. They again played at home in the third round, with the visitors being second division Charlton Athletic, and Rochdale were again the victors in a tight 1–0 win. Like Norwich, they received a bye through the fourth round to the quarter-finals, where they drew another Fourth Division side, York City, at Spotland. The match ended 2–1 to The Dale, putting them into the semi-finals and earning them a lucrative two-legged tie against Blackburn Rovers, their first top division opponents. They sprung a massive surprise by winning the first leg 3–1 at Spotland, but were almost felled in the return leg at Ewood Park two weeks later, as Rovers led 2–0, a result which would have put them through on the away goals rule, but a later Rochdale goal saw them progress as 4–3 aggregate winners.

== Details ==
=== First leg ===
26 April 1962

Rochdale	0–3	Norwich City
	Report	Lythgoe 4', 19'; Punton 85'

Spotland
Attendance: 11,123

1	(England) Ted Burgin
2	(England) Stanley Milburn (c)
3	(Scotland) Doug Winton
4	(England) Norman Bodell
5	(England) Ray Aspden
6	(England) Jimmy Thompson
7	(England) Doug Wragg
8	(England) Stan Hepton
9	(England) Louis Bimpson
10	(England) Ronnie Cairns
11	(England) Colin Whitaker
Manager:
(England) Tony Collins

1	(South Africa) Sandy Kennon
2	(England) Roy McCrohan
3	(England) Ron Ashman (c)
4	(Wales) Ollie Burton
5	(England) Barry Butler
6	(England) Joe Mullett
7	(England) Gerry Mannion
8	(England) Derrick Lythgoe
9	(England) Dick Scott
10	(Northern Ireland) Jimmy Hill
11	(Scotland) Bill Punton
Manager:
(Scotland) Willie Reid

=== Second leg ===
1 May 1962

Norwich City	1–0	Rochdale
Hill 74'	Report

Carrow Road
Attendance: 19,708

1	(South Africa) Sandy Kennon
2	(England) Roy McCrohan
3	(England) Ron Ashman (c)
4	(Wales) Ollie Burton
5	(England) Barry Butler
6	(England) Joe Mullett
7	(England) Gerry Mannion
8	(England) Derrick Lythgoe
9	(England) Dick Scott
10	(Northern Ireland) Jimmy Hill
11	(Scotland) Bill Punton
Manager:
(Scotland) Willie Reid

1	(England) Ted Burgin
2	(England) Stanley Milburn (c)
3	(Scotland) Doug Winton
4	(England) Norman Bodell
5	(England) Ray Aspden
6	(England) Jimmy Thompson
7	(England) Peter Whyke
8	(England) Joe Richardson
9	(England) Louis Bimpson
10	(England) Ronnie Cairns
11	(England) Colin Whitaker
'Manager:
(England) Tony Collins
