= Matthew Dennington =

South African cricketer

Personal information
- Full name: Matthew John Dennington
- Born: 16 October 1982 (age 44); Durban, South Africa
- Nickname: Denzel
- Height: 6 ft 1 in (1.85 m)
- Batting: Right-handed
- Bowling: Right-arm fast-medium
- Role: All-rounder

Domestic team information
- Years: Team
- 2003–2006: Kent
- FC debut: 28 April 2003 Kent v Oxford UCCE
- Last FC: 17 May 2006 Kent v Cambridge UCCE
- LA debut: 7 May 2003 Kent Cricket Board v Derbyshire
- Last LA: 23 April 2006 Kent v Somerset

Career statistics
Competition	FC	LA	T20
Matches	12	17	8
Runs scored	271	99	22
Batting average	19.35	12.37	7.33
100s/50s	0/3	0/0	0/0
Top score	55	26*	12
Balls bowled	1,087	600	144
Wickets	19	7	9
Bowling average	32.84	90.57	24.66
5 wickets in innings	0	0	0
10 wickets in match	0	0	0
Best bowling	3/23	3/53	4/28
Catches/stumpings	5/–	3/–	2/–
- Source: CricInfo, 1 June 2017

Matthew John Dennington (born 16 October 1982) is a South African born former professional cricketer. He was born in Durban but holds a European passport. He was educated at Northwood School in Durban, Varsity College and the University of South Africa. He played for Durban Cricket Club and KwaZulu-Natal B and was a member of the Shell SA Academy in 2002 before leaving South Africa to play cricket in England.

Dennington played for Orpington in the Kent Cricket League in 2002 and appeared for Kent County Cricket Club's Second XI during the season. He made a List A cricket appearance for the Kent Cricket Board in the 2003 Cheltenham & Gloucester Trophy before being contracted by Kent and playing for the county team in the National League and Twenty20 Cup the same year.

Playing as an all-rounder, he went on to make his first-class cricket debut for Kent in April 2004 against Oxford University at The University Parks. After appearing in seven first-class and 10 List A matches for Kent in 2004 he was retained for the 2005 season. His appearances for the county reduced in 2005 and in 2006 he played in only one first-class and one List A match and at the end of the season he was released by Kent.

In the Kent Cricket League Dennington played for St Lawrence and Highland Court during his time with Kent. He then moved to Bromley Cricket Club and played there until the end of the 2012 season. During 2012 he also played in the Leinster Senior League for Dublin University Cricket Club.
