= Roy Hollis =

English footballer

Personal information
- Full name: Roy Walter Hollis
- Date of birth: 24 December 1925
- Place of birth: Great Yarmouth, England
- Date of death: 12 November 1998 (aged 72)
- Place of death: Great Yarmouth, England
- Position: Centre forward

Senior career*
Years	Team	Apps	(Gls)
- Great Yarmouth Town
1947–1952	Norwich City	96	(52)
1952–1953	Tottenham Hotspur	3	(1)
1954–1960	Southend United	240	(120)
- Chelmsford City
- Lowestoft Town
- * Club domestic league appearances and goals

Roy Walter Hollis (24 December 1925 – 12 November 1998) was a footballer and is a member of the Norwich City Hall of Fame.

Great Yarmouth-born Hollis made 107 appearances for Norwich as a centre-forward between 1948 and 1952, scoring 59 times.

Hollis scored a hat-trick in less than 30 minutes on debut for Norwich. Of all Norwich's top-20 scorers (see List of Norwich City F.C. club records), his rate of a goal every 1.81 games is the best. His best return was five goals versus Walsall F.C. in 1951. After he left Norwich, he played for Tottenham Hotspur and Southend United F.C. He scored a hat-trick for the latter at Carrow Road in 1954, the "only player to score three times for and against City on the ground."

He was selected to play for the Third Division South representative team in 1956/57and 1957/58.
