= Philip Roettinger =

Personal information
- Born: September 22, 1915 Cincinnati, Ohio, United States
- Died: January 7, 2002 (aged 86) San Miguel de Allende, Guanajuato, Mexico

Sport
- Sport: Sports shooting

Philip Clay Roettinger (September 22, 1915 – January 7, 2002) was a CIA Operations Officer who helped plan and execute the 1954 overthrow of the Left-Wing Guatemalan government led by Jacobo Arbenz

The son of Ohio Judge S. C. Roettinger, Roettinger graduated from Ohio Wesleyan University and served as a U.S. Marine Corps Colonel in the Pacific during World War II. He was a member of the U.S. shooting team in the 1948 Summer Olympics in London. After the CIA, Roettinger settled in San Miguel de Allende, Mexico to devote time to painting and raising a family.
