= Bill Smith (footballer, born 1906) =

Scottish footballer

Personal information
- Full name: William Harris Smith
- Date of birth: 23 March 1906
- Place of birth: Kelvin, Scotland
- Date of death: 1979 (aged 72–73)
- Position: Left back

Senior career*
| Years | Team | Apps | (Gls) |
| ?–1930 | Burnbank Athletic | ? | (?) |
| 1930–1933 | Norwich City | 98 | (1) |
| 1933–1934 | Exeter City | 13 | (0) |
| 1934–? | Stenhousemuir | ? | (?) |
- * Club domestic league appearances and goals

William Harris Smith (23 March 1906 – 1979) was a Scottish footballer.

He played for Burnbank Athletic, Norwich City, Exeter City and Stenhousemuir.
