= Esko Kaonpää =

Finnish ice hockey player

Personal information
- Nationality: Finnish
- Born: 4 July 1942; Tampere, Finland
- Died: 9 January 2002 (aged 59); Tampere, Finland

Sport
- Sport: Ice hockey

Esko Kaonpää (4 July 1942 – 9 January 2002) was a Finnish ice hockey player. He competed in the men's tournament at the 1964 Winter Olympics.
