= Freddie Sharpe =

English footballer

Personal information
- Full name: Frederick Charles Sharpe
- Date of birth: 6 November 1937 (age 88)
- Place of birth: Brockley, England
- Position: Central defender

Senior career*
Years	Team	Apps	(Gls)
1958–1963	Tottenham Hotspur	2	(1)
1963–1969	Norwich City	111	(0)
1969–1970	Reading	64	(1)
- * Club domestic league appearances and goals

Frederick Charles Sharpe (born 6 November 1937) is an English former professional footballer who played for Tottenham Hotspur, Norwich City and Reading.

== Playing career ==
Sharpe joined Tottenham Hotspur as a junior in May 1956. The central defender featured in two matches and scored one goal for the Spurs in 1958–59.

== Post–football career ==
After retiring from competitive football, Sharpe became a school football coach. He was later employed as a salesman before establishing a car valeting concern.
