= Bernard Robinson (kickboxer) =

- Born: August 23, 1966 (age 60); Gaffney, South Carolina, United States
- Other names: Swiftkick
- Nationality: (United States) American
- Height: 5 ft 7 in (1.70 m)
- Division: Welterweight
- Style: Kickboxing
- Stance: Orthodox

Kickboxing record
- Total: 76
- Wins: 68
- By knockout: 37
- Losses: 8
- Draws: 0
- No contests: 0

Bernard "Swiftkick" Robinson (born August 23, 1966, in Gaffney, South Carolina) is a former three-time world kickboxing champion. His record is 68-8 (32 KOs). Robinson is also the Guinness world record holder for the Punch-Bag Marathon with a time of 37 hours and 30 minutes on September 1, 2008.

He also competed in 46 professional boxing matches.

He currently resides in Hendersonville, Tennessee.
