= Björn Landström =

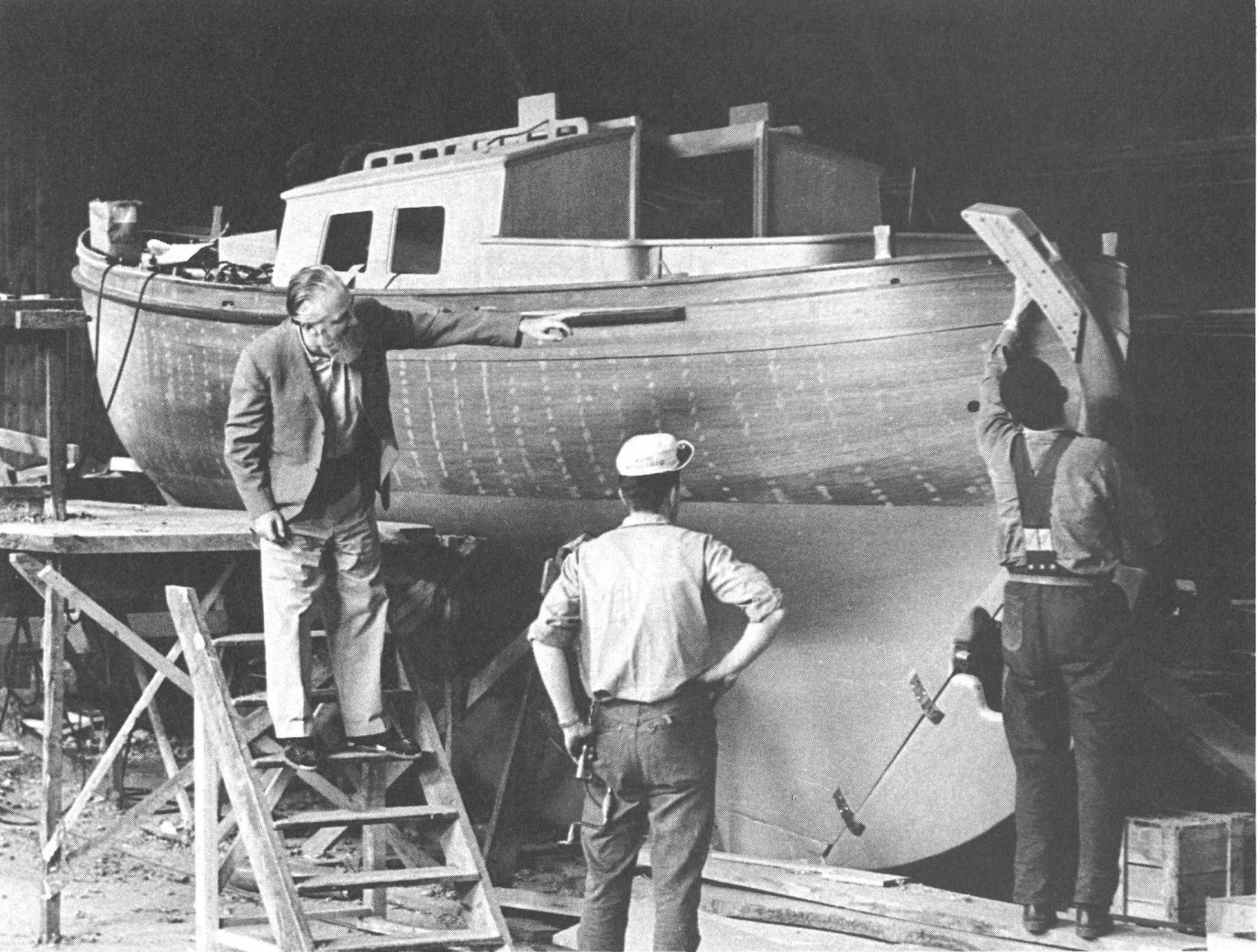
Björn Landström (left) supervising the construction of his boat Antilia

Björn Olof August Landström (21 April 1917, in Kuopio, Finland – 7 January 2002, in Helsinki) was a Finland Swedish artist, writer, graphic designer, illustrator and researcher. He was the son of master builder Artur Landström and Ester Äberg, and in 1939 married Else Astrid Linnea Grönros. After attending an advertising art school in Stockholm, he worked as an advertising manager from 1937 to 1939, a freelance artist from 1939 to 1949, and then as an illustrator and artistic director for the advertising agency Mainos-Taucher from 1949 to 1957. From 1955 to 1958, he was the rector of the School of Advertising Graphic Designers (Mainosgraafikkojen koulu). He also staged and directed the theater, co-writing the play Ett spel om en väg som till Äbo bar in 1949. Landström resided in Sweden from 1959–1970 and 1976–1979, and received an honorary doctorate from Uppsala University in 1971.

In 1961 he became internationally famous with his book The Ship (original Swedish title: Skeppet), a historical survey "from the primitive raft to the atom-powered submarine". His first novel was Ägatan 8 (1942), and he also wrote and illustrated historical novels such as Havet utan ände (1953) about the first circumnavigation of the world, and Vägen till Vinland (1954). Other notable works are Bold Voyages and Great Explorers (1964; original Swedish title: Vägen till Indien), which covers discovery expeditions from 1493 B.C. to 1488 A.D., Ships of the Pharaohs: 4000 Years of Egyptian Shipbuilding (1970; original Swedish title: Egyptiska skepp 4000—600 f.Kr.), and The Royal Warship Vasa (1980).
