= Willie Reid (footballer, died 1975) =

Scottish footballer and manager

Personal information
- Place of birth: Neilston, Scotland
- Date of death: 1975 (aged 58)
- Place of death: Troon, Scotland
- Position: Inside left

Senior career*
| Years | Team | Apps | (Gls) |
| – | Ashfield | | |
| 1937–1945 | Cowdenbeath | 55 | (17) |
| 1945–1953 | St Mirren | 116 | (18) |

Managerial career
- 1954–1961: St Mirren
- 1961–1962: Norwich City
- * Club domestic league appearances and goals

William Reid was a Scottish football player and manager; he managed Norwich City from 1961 to 1962.

== Managerial career ==
Norwich City

After he had guided St. Mirren to a Scottish League Cup final in 1956 and Scottish Cup victory in 1959, Reid was appointed as the manager of Norwich City on 14 December 1961. He led Norwich City to the 1962 League Cup with a final win against Rochdale, 4–0 on aggregate. This was Norwich City's first League Cup and first major trophy ever won. After only being in charge for 6 months Willie decided to leave the club and return home to his family in Troon, Scotland. Although Willie enjoyed a successful stint with Norwich City he was too homesick for Scotland to stay and decided against moving his family down.

== Honours ==
Norwich City

- Football League Cup: 1961–62
