= Gerrie Stroker =

Dutch footballer (1916–2002)

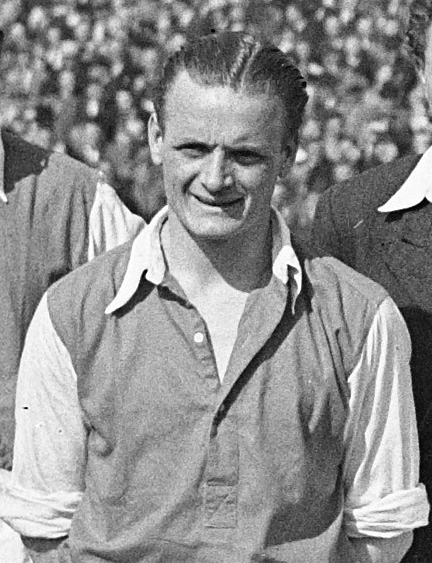
- Stroker in 1947

Personal information
- Full name: Gerardus Johannes Julianus Stroker
- Date of birth: 12 August 1916
- Place of birth: Amsterdam, Netherlands
- Date of death: 31 January 2002 (aged 85)
- Position: Forward

Senior career*
Years	Team	Apps	(Gls)
1936–1938	Blauw-Wit Amsterdam		
1938–1940	Ajax		
1942–1945	SpVgg Potsdam		
1946–1947	Ajax		

International career
1947	Netherlands	3	(0)

Managerial career
- 1947–1953: Koninklijke HFC
- 1954–1955: DWS Amsterdam
- 1958–1960: RKSV Volendam
- 1960–1962: HVC Amersfoort
- * Club domestic league appearances and goals

Gerardus Johannes Julianus Stroker (12 August 1916 – 31 January 2002) was a Dutch footballer who played as a forward. He made three appearances for the Netherlands national team in 1947.
