= James Jackson (footballer, born 1897) =

English footballer (1897–1964)

Personal information
- Full name: James Herbert Jackson
- Date of birth: 27 December 1897
- Place of birth: Bollington, England
- Date of death: 1964 (aged 66–67)
- Position: Centre forward

Senior career*
Years	Team	Apps	(Gls)
1919–1920	Bollington Cross		
1920–1921	Macclesfield		
1921–1922	Derby County	13	(4)
1922–1923	Bollington Cross		
1923–1928	Norwich City	111	(54)
Total		124	(58)
- * Club domestic league appearances and goals

James Herbert Jackson (27 December 1897 – 1964) was an English footballer who played in the Football League for Derby County and Norwich City.
