= Norman Wharton =

English footballer

Personal information
- Full name: Clarence Norman Wharton
- Date of birth: 28 July 1903
- Place of birth: Askam-in-Furness, England
- Date of death: July 1961 (aged 57–58)
- Height: 5 ft 11 1/2 in (1.82 m)
- Position: Goalkeeper

Senior career*
Years	Team	Apps	(Gls)
	Askam	?	(?)
1923–1925	Barrow	44	(0)
1925–1927	Preston North End	13	(0)
1927–1928	Barrow	27	(0)
1928–1931	Sheffield United	70	(0)
1931–1935	Norwich City	101	(0)
1935–1936	Doncaster Rovers	5	(0)
1936–1939	York City	117	(0)
1939	Leeds United	2	(0)
- * Club domestic league appearances and goals

Clarence Norman Wharton (28 July 1903 in Askam-in-Furness, Lancashire, England – July 1961) was an English footballer.

== Career ==
He started his career with Askam, before joining Barrow in 1922. After making 44 league appearances for the club, he joined Preston North End in 1925. He made 13 league appearances for the club and rejoined Barrow in 1927. He moved to Sheffield United for a fee of £250 in 1928. He joined Norwich City in 1931 after making 70 league appearances for United. He won a Third Division South championship medal with them in the 1933–34 season. After making 101 league appearances for them, he joined Doncaster Rovers in May 1935. He joined York City in 1936 after making five league appearances for Rovers. He appeared in the club's 16 FA Cup ties played in the 1936–37 and 1937–38 seasons. He joined Leeds United in August 1939 after making 134 appearances for York. He made two league appearances for United.
