= Harry Brown (footballer, born 1907) =

Scottish footballer (1907–1963

Personal information
- Full name: Henry Summers Brown
- Date of birth: 18 September 1907
- Place of birth: Kirkcaldy, Scotland
- Date of death: 8 December 1993, aged 86
- Place of death: Kirkcaldy, Scotland
- Height: 5 ft 7 in (1.70 m)
- Position: Inside forward

Youth career
- Wemyss Athletic

Senior career*
Years	Team	Apps	(Gls)
1928–1932	Hibernian	113	(33)
1932–1934	Darlington	57	(17)
1934–1937	Chesterfield	111	(25)
1937–1938	Plymouth Argyle	45	(12)
1938–1939	Reading	26	(4)
- * Club domestic league appearances and goals

Henry Summers Brown (18 September 1907 – 8 December 1993) was a Scottish footballer who played as an inside forward for various clubs in the 1930s, including Hibernian, Darlington, Chesterfield, Plymouth Argyle and Reading. At Chesterfield, he was a member of the team that won the Football League Third Division North championship in 1935–36.

== Honours ==
Chesterfield

- Football League Third Division North champions: 1935–36
