= Reg Foulkes =

English footballer

Reginald Ernest Foulkes (23 February 1923 – 24 November 2014) was a footballer and a member of the Norwich City F.C. Hall of Fame. He was born in Shrewsbury, Shropshire.

Foulkes made 238 appearances for Norwich City as a centre-half between 1950 and 1956, scoring eight times.

Previously at Walsall, for whom he made 160 appearances in the Football League, Foulkes was the first signing of City manager Norman Low. Foulkes was Norwich captain and led the side to finish second, third and fourth in Division Three South in his first three seasons.

Foulkes died in November 2014 at the age of 91.

Sporting positions
Preceded by Norman Low	Norwich City Captain; 1950-1953	Succeeded by Ron Ashman
Preceded by Ron Ashman	Norwich City Captain; 1954-1955	Succeeded by Ron Ashman
