= Isaac George Martin =

English footballer

Isaac George Martin (25 May 1889 – 6 May 1962) was a professional footballer.

Martin, a central defender, began his career with Sunderland and Portsmouth before spending the majority of his career with Norwich City where he made 243 appearances, scoring once.
