= Bill Punton (footballer, born 1934) =

Scottish footballer and manager

Personal information
- Full name: William Hamilton Punton
- Date of birth: 9 May 1934 (age 92)
- Place of birth: Ormiston, Scotland
- Position: Winger

Youth career
- Portadown

Senior career*
Years	Team	Apps	(Gls)
1954–1958	Newcastle United	23	(1)
1958–1959	Southend United	38	(6)
1959–1967	Norwich City	219	(24)
1967	Sheffield United	16	(1)
1967–1969	Scunthorpe United	45	(2)
- Great Yarmouth Town
Total		359	(37)

Managerial career
- 1969–1990: Great Yarmouth Town
- 1990-1997: Diss Town
- * Club domestic league appearances and goals

William Hamilton Punton (born 9 May 1934) is a Scottish former footballer and manager.

Born in Ormiston, East Lothian, Punton was a left-sided winger who played for Portadown before signing for Newcastle United in February 1954. He made his Football League debut in April 1954 against Manchester City, but did not appear in the first team again for almost 18 months. He made 23 league appearances during his four-year spell at the club. In July 1958, he was sold to Southend United in a part exchange deal which saw Southend's John McGuigan join Newcastle. A year later he joined Norwich City, where he made over 200 league appearances. He also scored for Norwich in the 1962 Football League Cup Final against Rochdale. He went on to play for Sheffield United, Scunthorpe and Yarmouth Town.

At the end of his playing career, Punton moved into management, spending 20 years in charge of Great Yarmouth Town. He later became manager of Diss Town, leading them to victory in the FA Vase final in 1994, beating Taunton Town 2-1 after Extra time with the Diss goals scored by Paul Gibbs from a penalty and the winner from Peter Mendham.

== Honours ==
Norwich City

- Football League Cup: 1961–62
