= Charles Dennington =

English footballer

Personal information
- Date of birth: 7 October 1899
- Place of birth: Beccles, England
- Date of death: 25 January 1943 (aged 43)
- Place of death: Beccles, England
- Position: Goalkeeper

Youth career
- Beccles Town

Senior career*
Years	Team	Apps	(Gls)
1922–1929	Norwich City	195	(0)
1929–1930	Bradford City	18	(0)
1930–1931	Kirkley		
1931–1933	Beccles Town		
1933–1935	Kirkley		
1935	Gorleston		
- * Club domestic league appearances and goals

Charles Dennington (7 October 1899 – 25 January 1943) was an English professional footballer who played as a goalkeeper.

== Career ==
Born in Beccles, Dennington played for Norwich City, Bradford City and Kirkley. He joined Norwich from his home town club, Beccles Town, and made his debut in a 1–1 draw against Queens Park Rangers in the Third Division (South) in August 1922, establishing himself as the Canaries' first choice ahead of William O'Hagen and Ernest Williamson. He missed just twenty League games over the next five seasons and became the first goalkeeper to play one hundred League matches for the club. After playing in Norwich's 5–2 home win against Watford on 2 May 1929, he was immediately transfer-listed for 'intemperate habits'. He played once more, in a 2–2 draw against Newport County, before being sold to Bradford City for £500, ten days later. There, he made 18 Football League appearances, before signing for non-league Kirkley, and then returning to Beccles. He played in the Suffolk Senior Cup Final with Kirkley in 1935, losing 3–1 to Newmarket Town, before finishing his career at Gorleston.

== Sources ==
- Davage, Mike (2002). Canary Citizens. Jarrold Publishing. ISBN 0-7117-2020-7.
- Frost, Terry (1988). Bradford City A Complete Record 1903-1988. Breedon Books Sport. ISBN 0-907969-38-0.
