= Billy Eden =

English footballer (1905–1993

Personal information
- Full name: William Eden
- Date of birth: 1 July 1905
- Place of birth: Stockton, England
- Date of death: 1993 (aged 87–88)
- Place of death: Darlington, England
- Height: 5 ft 8 in (1.73 m)
- Position: Outside left

Senior career*
Years	Team	Apps	(Gls)
- Loftus Albion
1928–1929	Darlington	40	(15)
1929–1932	Sunderland	60	(18)
1932–1935	Darlington	79	(16)
1935–1939	Tranmere Rovers	139	(30)
1939–1940	New Brighton	0	(0)
- * Club domestic league appearances and goals

William Eden (1 July 1905 – 1993) was an English footballer who played as an outside left for Darlington, Sunderland, Tranmere Rovers and New Brighton. He made 152 appearances for Tranmere, scoring 31 goals.
