= Bernard Robinson (footballer) =

English footballer

Personal information
- Birth name: Bernard Cecil Robinson
- Date of birth: 5 December 1911
- Place of birth: Cambridge, England
- Date of death: 29 November 2004 (aged 92)
- Place of death: Sprowston, England
- Height: 5 ft 10 1/2 in (1.79 m)

Youth career
- King's Lynn

Senior career*
Years	Team	Apps	(Gls)
1932–1949	Norwich City	360	(13)
- * Club domestic league appearances and goals

Bernard Cecil Robinson (5 December 1911 – 29 November 2004) was an English footballer who spent his entire professional career with Norwich City. He was a half-back, usually on the right side, and is regarded as one of the club's greatest ever players.

Robinson played 380 League and Cup games for Norwich after joining from King's Lynn, from his debut on 2 April 1932 at Exeter City to his final appearance on 12 March 1949 against Ipswich Town at Carrow Road, scoring 14 goals. The Second World War took six years out of his career, but for which he may well have become the club's appearance record holder - he also played in 160 wartime matches for the Canaries. He was a member of the Norwich team that won the Division Three (South) Championship in 1934 and was considered an expert penalty taker, as well as a long throw specialist.

After retiring from football, Robinson briefly ran a public house. By the time of the club's centenary celebrations in 2002, Robinson was the club's oldest surviving player, living in retirement in Sprowston, near Norwich.

Five days after Robinson's death, a minute's silence was held before Norwich's home match against Fulham, and the squad wore black armbands in further tribute.

== Sources ==
- Davage, Mark; Eastwood, John; Platt, Kevin (2001). Canary Citizens. Jarrold Publishing. ISBN 0-7117-2020-7.
- 12 Canary Greats by Rick Waghorn, published by Jarrold Publishing (2004), ISBN 978-0-7117-4026-6
