= Bryan Thurlow =

English footballer

Bryan Alfred Thurlow (6 June 1936 – 5 January 2002) was a professional footballer who spent the majority of his career with Norwich City.

Thurlow, a right-back, began his career in local non-league football (playing for Loddon and Bungay Town) before signing for Norwich as a professional in August 1954. He stayed at Carrow Road for ten years, playing an important part in the club's run to the semi-finals of the FA Cup in 1959 and their promotion to division two a year later. In total, he played 224 games for Norwich, scoring 1 goal. After leaving Norwich in 1964, he played for Bristol City and Lowestoft Town before retiring. He died in 2002.

== Sources ==
- Mark Davage; John Eastwood; Kevin Platt (2001). Canary Citizens. Jarrold Publishing. ISBN 0-7117-2020-7.
