= List of Norwich City F.C. records and statistics =

This is a list of the most notable Norwich City F.C. club records.

== Players ==
=== Appearances ===
Kevin Keelan holds the record for Norwich City appearances, having played 673 first-team matches between 1963 and 1980.

=== Goals ===
- Ralph Hunt holds the record for the most League goals scored in a season, 31 in the 1955–56 season in Division Three (South).
- Johnny Gavin the top scorer over a career - 122 between 1948 and 1955.

=== Transfers ===
- The highest transfer fee received for a Norwich City player is approximately £33 million for Emiliano Buendia (to Aston Villa) in June 2021,
- Most spent by the club on a player was £9.1 million for Steven Naismith from Everton in 2016. This was then equalled by the club signing Christos Tzolis from Club Brugge and Milot Rashica from Werder Bremen, both in 2021.

== Matches ==
The club's widest victory margin in the league was their 10–2 win against Coventry City in the Division Three (South) in 1930. Their heaviest defeat in the league was 10–2 against Swindon Town in 1908 in the Southern Football League.

Norwich's record home attendance is 43,984 for a sixth round FA Cup match against Leicester City on 30 March 1963.

== Seasons ==
The club's highest league finish was third in the FA Premiership in 1992–93. The club has won the League Cup twice (most recently in 1985) and also reached the FA Cup semi-final three times, most recently in 1992. Norwich have taken part in European competition just once, reaching the third round of the UEFA Cup in 1993–94.
