= 1961–62 Football League Cup =

1961–62 League Cup
Tournament details
- Country: England; Wales
- Teams: 82

Final positions
- Champions: Norwich City
- Runners-up: Rochdale

Tournament statistics
- Matches played: 104
- Top goal scorer: Ray Charnley (6 goals)

The 1961–62 Football League Cup was the second season of the Football League Cup, a knockout competition for England's top 92 football clubs; only 82 of them took part. (Note: Arsenal, Burnley, Chelsea, Everton, Liverpool, Manchester United, Sheffield Wednesday, Tottenham Hotspur, West Bromwich Albion and Wolverhampton Wanderers were the 10 League clubs that did not compete.) The competition began on 11 September 1961, and ended with the two-legged final on 26 April and 1 May 1962.

Aston Villa unsuccessfully defended its 1962 title on 21 November 1961 at the Third Round Ties against Ipswich Town, 2–3.

Norwich City beat Rochdale 4–0 on aggregate over two legs. Norwich won the first leg 3–0 away at Spotland, thanks to goals from Derrick Lythgoe (2) and Punton. In the second leg at Carrow Road, Jimmy Hill scored to give Norwich a 1–0 win on the night and a 4–0 aggregate victory. Rochdale were then playing in the old Fourth Division; this is one of only two occasions where a fourth-tier side reached the final, the other being Bradford City in 2012–13.

Match dates and results were initially drawn from Soccerbase, and they were later checked against Rothmans Football Yearbook 1970–71.

== Calendar ==
Semi-finals and final were played over two legs.

Round	Dates	Fixtures			Clubs	New entries this round
Round	Dates	Original	Replays	Byes	Clubs	New entries this round
First Round	11–14 September 1961	40	8	—	82 → 42	80
Second Round	2–16 October 1961	21	7	0	42 → 21	2 (teams competing in the 1961–62 European Cup Winners' Cup)
Third Round	13–21 November 1961	10	3	1	21 → 11	none
Fourth Round	11–13 December 1961	3	1	5	11 → 8	none
Fifth Round	6–7 February 1962	4	1	0	8 → 4	none
Semi-finals	19 March – 16 April 1962	4	0	0	4 → 2	none
Final	26 April – 1 May 1962	2	0	0	2 → 1	none

== First round ==
=== Ties ===
Home team	Score	Away team	Date
Barnsley (3)	3–2	Southport (4)	13-09-1961
Barrow (4)	0–2	Portsmouth (3)	13-09-1961
Birmingham City (1)	1–1	Swindon Town (3)	13-09-1961
Blackpool (1)	2–1	Port Vale (3)	13-09-1961
Bolton Wanderers (1)	1–1	Sunderland (2)	13-09-1961
Bournemouth & Boscombe Athletic (3)	2–2	Torquay United (3)	13-09-1961
Bradford City (4)	3–4	Aston Villa (1)	13-09-1961
Bristol Rovers (2)	2–1	Hartlepools United (4)	11-09-1961
Bury (2)	5–1	Brighton & Hove Albion (2)	12-09-1961
Cardiff City (1)	2–0	Wrexham (4)	13-09-1961
Carlisle United (4)	1–1	Huddersfield Town (2)	12-09-1961
Chesterfield (4)	2–3	Norwich City (2)	13-09-1961
Colchester United (4)	1–2	Crewe Alexandra (4)	13-09-1961
Darlington (4)	0–1	Rotherham United (2)	11-09-1961
Doncaster Rovers (4)	3–2	Grimsby Town (3)	13-09-1961
Fulham (1)	1–1	Sheffield United (1)	13-09-1961
Hull City (3)	4–2	Bradford Park Avenue (3)	11-09-1961
Ipswich Town (1)	4–2	Manchester City (1)	11-09-1961
Leeds United (2)	4–1	Brentford (3)	13-09-1961
Lincoln City (3)	1–0	Accrington Stanley (4)	13-09-1961
Luton Town (2)	2–1	Northampton Town (3)	13-09-1961
Mansfield Town (4)	5–2	Exeter City (4)	11-09-1961
Millwall (4)	1–2	Walsall (2)	13-09-1961
Newcastle United (2)	2–0	Scunthorpe United (2)	13-09-1961
Newport County (3)	0–0	Shrewsbury Town (3)	11-09-1961
Nottingham Forest (1)	4–1	Gillingham (4)	11-09-1961
Notts County (3)	2–2	Derby County (2)	14-09-1961
Oldham Athletic (4)	1–4	Charlton Athletic (2)	12-09-1961
Peterborough United (3)	1–3	Blackburn Rovers (1)	11-09-1961
Preston North End (2)	3–1	Aldershot (4)	13-09-1961
Queens Park Rangers (3)	5–2	Crystal Palace (3)	13-09-1961
Reading (3)	4–2	Chester (4)	13-09-1961
Southampton (2)	0–0	Rochdale (4)	13-09-1961
Southend United (3)	0–1	Stoke City (2)	13-09-1961
Stockport County (4)	0–1	Leyton Orient (2)	11-09-1961
Tranmere Rovers (4)	3–6	Middlesbrough (2)	13-09-1961
Watford (3)	3–0	Halifax Town (3)	11-09-1961
West Ham United (1)	3–2	Plymouth Argyle (2)	11-09-1961
Workington (4)	3–0	Coventry City (3)	13-09-1961
York City (4)	3–0	Bristol City (3)	13-09-1961

=== Replays ===
Home team	Score	Away team	Date
Derby County (2)	3–2	Notts County (3)	27-09-1961
Huddersfield Town (2)	3–0	Carlisle United (4)	25-09-1961
Rochdale (4)	2–1	Southampton (2)	27-09-1961
Sheffield United (1)	4–0	Fulham (1)	25-09-1961
Shrewsbury Town (3)	3–1	Newport County (3)	28-09-1961
Sunderland (2)	1–0	Bolton Wanderers (1)	25-09-1961
Swindon Town (3)	2–0	Birmingham City (1)	25-09-1961
Torquay United (3)	0–1	Bournemouth & Boscombe Athletic (3)	25-09-1961

=== Byes ===
These two teams received byes as they were competing in the 1961–62 European Cup Winners' Cup.

Team
Leicester City (1)
Swansea Town (2)

== Second round ==
=== Ties ===
Home team	Score	Away team	Date
Barnsley (3)	1–3	Workington (4)	09-10-1961
Bristol Rovers (2)	1–1	Blackburn Rovers (1)	02-10-1961
Bury (2)	3–4	Hull City (3)	03-10-1961
Charlton Athletic (2)	4–1	Stoke City (2)	04-10-1961
Leeds United (2)	3–2	Huddersfield Town (2)	04-10-1961
Leyton Orient (2)	1–1	Blackpool (1)	04-10-1961
Luton Town (2)	0–0	Rotherham United (2)	04-10-1961
Mansfield Town (4)	1–1	Cardiff City (1)	05-10-1961
Middlesbrough (2)	3–1	Crewe Alexandra (4)	04-10-1961
Norwich City (2)	3–2	Lincoln City (3)	04-10-1961
Portsmouth (3)	1–1	Derby County (2)	04-10-1961
Preston North End (2)	3–1	Swindon Town (3)	09-10-1961
Queens Park Rangers (3)	1–2	Nottingham Forest (1)	11-10-1961
Rochdale (4)	4–0	Doncaster Rovers (4)	04-10-1961
Sheffield United (1)	2–2	Newcastle United (2)	02-10-1961
Shrewsbury Town (3)	1–3	Bournemouth & Boscombe Athletic (3)	09-10-1961
Sunderland (2)	5–2	Walsall (2)	04-10-1961
Swansea Town (2)	3–3	Ipswich Town (1)	03-10-1961
Watford (3)	3–1	Reading (3)	16-10-1961
West Ham United (1)	1–3	Aston Villa (1)	09-10-1961
York City (4)	2–1	Leicester City (1)	09-10-1961

=== Replays ===
Home team	Score	Away team	Date
Blackburn Rovers (1)	4–0	Bristol Rovers (2)	16-10-1961
Blackpool (1)	5–1	Leyton Orient (2)	30-10-1961
Cardiff City (1)	2–1	Mansfield Town (4)	23-10-1961
Derby County (2)	2–4	Portsmouth (3)	01-11-1961
Ipswich Town (1)	3–2	Swansea Town (2)	24-10-1961
Newcastle United (2)	0–2	Sheffield United (1)	11-10-1961
Rotherham United (2)	2–0	Luton Town (2)	10-10-1961

== Third round ==
=== Ties ===
Home team	Score	Away team	Date
Aston Villa (1)	2–3	Ipswich Town (1)	21-11-1961
Bournemouth & Boscombe Athletic (3)	3–0	Cardiff City (1)	15-11-1961
Norwich City (2)	3–2	Middlesbrough (2)	15-11-1961
Nottingham Forest (1)	1–2	Blackburn Rovers (1)	14-11-1961
Preston North End (2)	0–0	Rotherham United (2)	14-11-1961
Rochdale (4)	1–0	Charlton Athletic (2)	14-11-1961
Sheffield United (1)	1–0	Portsmouth (3)	13-11-1961
Sunderland (2)	2–1	Hull City (3)	15-11-1961
Workington (4)	0–1	Blackpool (1)	15-11-1961
York City (4)	1–1	Watford (3)	15-11-1961

=== Replays ===
Home team	Score	Away team	Date
Rotherham United (2)	3–0	Preston North End (2)	28-11-1961
Watford (3)	2–2	York City (4)	21-11-1961

=== 2nd Replay ===
Home team	Score	Away team	Date
York City (4)	3–2	Watford (3)	04-12-1961

=== Bye ===
Team
Leeds United (2)

== Fourth round ==
=== Ties ===
Home team	Score	Away team	Date
Blackburn Rovers (1)	4–1	Ipswich Town (1)	11-12-1961
Rotherham United (2)	1–1	Leeds United (2)	12-12-1961
York City (4)	1–0	Bournemouth & Boscombe Athletic (3)	13-12-1961

=== Replay ===
Home team	Score	Away team	Date
Leeds United (1)	1–2	Rotherham United (2)	15-01-1962

=== Byes ===
Team
Blackpool (1)
Norwich City (2)
Rochdale (4)
Sheffield United (1)
Sunderland (2)

== Fifth round ==
=== Ties ===
Home team	Score	Away team	Date
Blackpool (1)	0–0	Sheffield United (1)	06-02-1962
Rochdale (4)	2–1	York City (4)	07-02-1962
Rotherham United (2)	0–1	Blackburn Rovers (1)	06-02-1962
Sunderland (2)	1–4	Norwich City (2)	07-02-1962

=== Replay ===
Home team	Score	Away team	Date
Sheffield United (1)	0–2	Blackpool (1)	27-03-1962

== Semi-finals ==
=== First leg ===
Home team	Score	Away team	Date
Rochdale (4)	3–1	Blackburn Rovers (1)	19-03-1962
Norwich City (2)	4–1	Blackpool (1)	11-04-1962

=== Second leg ===
Home team	Score	Away team	Date	Agg
Blackburn Rovers (1)	2–1	Rochdale (4)	04-04-1962	3–4
Blackpool (1)	2–0	Norwich City (2)	16-04-1962	3–4

== Final ==
The final was played over two legs.

26 April 1962
First leg

Rochdale (4)	0–3	Norwich City (2)
	Summary	Lythgoe; Punton

Spotland Stadium, Rochdale
Attendance: 11,123
Referee: A. Holland

Rochdale: Burgin — Milburn, Winton, Bodell, Aspden, James Thompson, Wragg, Hepton, Bimpson, Cairns, Whitaker.

Norwich City: Kennon — McCrohan, Ashman, Burton, Barry Butler, Mullett, Mannion, Lythgoe, Scott, James Hill, Punton.

1 May 1962
Second leg

Norwich City (2)	1–0	Rochdale (4)
Hill	Summary

Carrow Road, Norwich City
Attendance: 19,708
Referee: R. H. Mann

Norwich City: Kennon — McCrohan, Ashman, Burton, Barry Butler, Mullett, Mannion, Lythgoe, Scott, James Hill, Punton.

Rochdale: Burgin — Milburn, Winton, Bodell, Aspden, James Thompson, Whyke, Joe Richardson, Bimpson, Cairns, Whitaker.

Norwich City win 4–0 on aggregate.
