= Ken Wookey (footballer, born 1946) =

Welsh footballer and manager

Personal information
- Full name: Kenneth George Wookey
- Date of birth: 30 December 1946
- Place of birth: Newport, Wales
- Date of death: 16 December 1992 (aged 45)
- Place of death: Taunton, England
- Position: Centre-forward

Senior career*
Years	Team	Apps	(Gls)
1964–1969	Newport County	63	(6)
1969	→ Lovell's Athletic (loan)		
1969–1970	Port Vale	24	(4)
1970–1971	Workington	17	(4)
- Yeovil Town
1972–	Salisbury		
- Barry Town
- Westland Sports
- Chard Town
- Glastonbury
- Sturminster Newton United

Managerial career
- Sturminster Newton United
- Shaftesbury
- * Club domestic league appearances and goals

Kenneth George Wookey (30 December 1946 – 16 December 1992) was a Welsh footballer and football manager. A striker, he spent six years in the Football League. His father, also called Ken Wookey, was also a professional footballer.

Wookey started his career with local club Newport County in 1964. After five years with County, he was loaned out to Lovell's Athletic before signing permanently with Port Vale in 1969. After helping the "Valiants" to promotion out of the Fourth Division in 1969–70, he transferred to Workington. In 1971, he dropped into Non-League football when he joined Yeovil Town. He later played for Salisbury City, Barry Town, Westland Sports, Chard Town, Glastonbury Town, and Sturminster Newton United. He later managed Sturminster Newton and Shaftesbury.

== Career ==
Wookey began his career at Newport County, as the "Ironsides" posted a 16th-place finish in the Fourth Division in 1964–65. He helped Billy Lucas's side up to ninth place in 1965–66, before they dropped down to 18th in 1966–67. Leslie Graham then took charge at Somerton Park, and led Newport to 12th in 1967–68 and then 22nd in 1968–69. Wookey also had a loan spell with Lovell's Athletic.

He signed with Gordon Lee's Port Vale in July 1969. He scored four goals in 29 games of the 1969–70 Fourth Division promotion winning season, but lost his first-team place at Vale Park in February 1970 and was given a free transfer to Workington in May of that year. He scoured four goals in 16 Fourth Division games in 1970–71, before leaving Borough Park and the Football League to join Yeovil Town in the Southern League. He later played for Salisbury, Barry Town, Westland Sports, Chard Town and Glastonbury Town, before becoming player-manager of Sturminster Newton United. After leaving Sturminster he then became the manager of Shaftesbury.

== Family ==
His father Ken was also a professional footballer.

== Career statistics ==
Appearances and goals by club, season and competition
Club	Season	League			FA Cup		League Cup		Total	
Club	Season	Division	Apps	Goals	Apps	Goals	Apps	Goals	Apps	Goals
Newport County	1963–64	Fourth Division	0	0	0	0	0	0	0	0
Newport County	1964–65	Fourth Division	1	0	0	0	0	0	1	0
Newport County	1965–66	Fourth Division	11	3	0	0	0	0	11	3
Newport County	1966–67	Fourth Division	15	1	0	0	1	0	16	1
Newport County	1967–68	Fourth Division	17	2	0	0	1	0	18	2
Newport County	1968–69	Fourth Division	19	0	2	0	0	0	214	0
Newport County	Total		63	6	2	0	2	0	67	6
Port Vale	1969–70	Fourth Division	24	4	4	0	1	0	29	4
Workington	1970–71	Fourth Division	17	4	0	0	1	0	18	4

== Honours ==
Port Vale

- Football League Fourth Division fourth-place promotion: 1969–70
