= Wilf Smith =

Wilf or Wilfred Smith may refer to:

- W. G. G. Duncan Smith (1914–1996), British flying ace
- Wilfrid Smith (British Army officer) (1867–1942), British general
- Wilf Smith (footballer, born 1917) (1917–1995), former Port Vale footballer
- Wilf Smith (footballer, born 1918), English-born former Bristol Rovers footballer
- Wilf Smith (footballer, born 1946), German-born former Bristol Rovers footballer
- Wilfrid Smith (1899–1976), American football player and sports writer for the Chicago Tribune
- Wilfred Cantwell Smith (1916–2000), Canadian professor of comparative religion
- Wilfred Davy Smith (1881–1942), physician and politician in Ontario, Canada
- Wilfred I. Smith (1919–1998), Canadian Dominion archivist
- Wilfred Smith (footballer) (1910-after 1935), English former footballer, who played for Rotherham United and Burnley
- Wilfred Talbot Smith (1885–1957), occultist and follower of Aleister Crowley
