= 1962–63 Newport County A.F.C. season =

Welsh association football club season

Newport County
1962–63 season
- Manager: Billy Lucas
- Stadium: Somerton Park
- Fourth Division: 20th
- FA Cup: 1st round
- Football League Cup: 3rd round
- Welsh Cup: Runners up
- Top goalscorer: League: Hunt (27); All: Hunt (32)
- Highest home attendance: 10,488 vs Oldham Athletic (20 August 1962)
- Lowest home attendance: 2,242 vs Doncaster Rovers (27 April 1963)
- Average home league attendance: 4,523
Home colours	Away colours

The 1962–63 season was Newport County's first ever season in the Football League Fourth Division since relegation from the Third Division the previous season. It was their 35th competitive season overall in the Football League.

== Season review ==
=== Results summary ===
Overall								Home						Away					
Pld	W	D	L	GF	GA	GAv	Pts	W	D	L	GF	GA	Pts	W	D	L	GF	GA	Pts
46	14	11	21	76	90	0.844	39	11	6	6	44	29	28	3	5	15	32	61	11

Source: rsssf.com

=== Results by round ===
Round	1	2	3	4	5	6	7	8	9	10	11	12	13	14	15	16	17	18	19	20	21	22	23	24	25	26	27	28	29	30	31	32	33	34	35	36	37	38	39	40	41	42	43	44	45	46
Ground	A	H	H	A	A	H	H	A	A	H	A	H	H	H	A	H	A	A	H	H	A	H	H	A	A	H	A	H	A	H	H	A	H	A	A	H	A	A	H	A	H	A	A	A	H	H
Result	W	D	D	L	L	W	D	L	D	W	L	W	L	W	D	L	L	W	W	D	D	L	W	L	L	L	L	W	L	L	W	D	D	L	D	W	L	L	L	W	W	L	L	L	D	W
Position	8	5	9	15	18	12	11	15	15	7	14	12	12	11	12	12	17	14	11	12	10	11	9	12	16	18	19	16	17	19	16	17	16	20	19	17	21	21	21	21	21	21	21	21	21	20

Updated to match(es) played on 23 May 1963. Source: statto.com
A = Away; H = Home; W = Win; D = Draw; L = Loss

== Fixtures and results ==
=== Fourth Division ===
Date	Opponents	Venue	Result	Scorers	Attendance
18 Aug 1962	Hartlepool United	A	3–2	Hunt 2, Herritty	5,234
20 Aug 1962	Oldham Athletic	H	0–0		10,488
25 Aug 1962	Darlington	H	2–2	Hunt 2	7,786
29 Aug 1962	Oldham Athletic	A	2–3	Hunt, Gordon	18,082
1 Sep 1962	Southport	A	1–2	Bonson	3,885
3 Sep 1962	Lincoln City	H	2–1	Hudson, Smith	6,864
8 Sep 1962	Aldershot	H	2–2	Bonson, Sheffield	6,002
12 Sep 1962	Lincoln City	A	3–6	Hunt 2, Bonson	5,006
15 Sep 1962	Stockport County	A	1–1	Hunt	3,704
17 Sep 1962	Barrow	H	6–0	Hunt 3, Bonson 2, Thomas	5,733
22 Sep 1962	Oxford United	A	1–5	Bonson	9,131
29 Sep 1962	Bradford City	H	2–0	Bonson, OG	4,700
1 Oct 1962	Chesterfield	H	2–3	Bonson, Hunt	6,029
6 Oct 1962	Crewe Alexandra	H	5–1	Hunt 3, Herritty, Bird	4,737
13 Oct 1962	Chester	A	2–2	Herritty, Bonson	8,034
18 Oct 1962	York City	H	1–3	Hunt	5,406
27 Oct 1962	Brentford	A	1–3	Bonson	11,300
10 Nov 1962	Chesterfield	A	2–1	Hunt 2	6,425
17 Nov 1962	Exeter City	H	4–0	Bonson 3, Hunt	3,221
1 Dec 1962	Mansfield Town	H	1–1	Bonson	5,399
8 Dec 1962	Doncaster Rovers	A	2–2	Herritty, Bonson	3,875
10 Dec 1962	Tranmere Rovers	H	1–2	Rowland	4,536
15 Dec 1962	Hartlepools United	H	2–1	Bonson, Hunt	2,830
22 Dec 1962	Darlington	A	2–4	Bonson 2	3,701
27 Feb 1963	Torquay United	A	1–3	Smith	4,027
4 Mar 1963	Chester	H	0–1		3,721
8 Mar 1963	York City	A	0–2		4,081
11 Mar 1963	Southport	H	1–0	Hill	2,522
13 Mar 1963	Crewe Alexandra	A	1–4	Sheffield	6,293
16 Mar 1963	Brentford	H	1–4	Smith	2,891
18 Mar 1963	Torquay United	H	1–0	Hunt	3,654
23 Mar 1963	Rochdale	A	3–3	Hudson, Hunt, Smith	3,029
1 Apr 1963	Workington	H	2–2	Bowman, Bonson	4,065
6 Apr 1963	Exeter City	A	0–1		5,258
12 Apr 1963	Tranmere Rovers	A	0–0		10,738
13 Apr 1963	Gillingham	H	2–0	Hunt, Sheffield	2,821
20 Apr 1963	Mansfield Town	A	1–2	Rathbone	6,038
24 Apr 1963	Gillingham	A	1–3	Sheffield	5,867
27 Apr 1963	Doncaster Rovers	H	2–4	Hunt 2	2,242
1 May 1963	Bradford City	A	4–3	Bonson 2, Smith 2	1,983
4 May 1963	Stockport County	H	3–1	Rowland, Sheffield, Hunt	2,573
11 May 1963	Workington	A	0–4		3,128
13 May 1963	Barrow	A	0–3		3,640
18 May 1963	Aldershot	A	1–2	Smith	3,003
20 May 1963	Rochdale	H	1–1	Bonson	2,387
23 May 1963	Oxford United	H	1–0	Hunt	3,442

=== FA Cup ===
Round	Date	Opponents	Venue	Result	Scorers	Attendance
1	3 Nov 1962	Queens Park Rangers	A	2–3	Herritty, Bonson	12,240

=== Football League Cup ===
Round	Date	Opponents	Venue	Result	Scorers	Attendance
1	5 Sep 1962	Gillingham	H	2–1	Hudson, Hunt	3,864
2	26 Sep 1962	Aldershot	A	3–0	Bonson 3	5,328
3	24 Oct 1962	Manchester City	H	1–2	Herritty	9,869

=== Welsh Cup ===
Round	Date	Opponents	Venue	Result	Scorers	Attendance
5	21 Mar 1963	Merthyr Tydfil	A	4–0	Herritty, Bonson, Sheffield, OG	
6	17 Apr 1963	Holywell	A	6–2	Hunt 3, Hudson, Sheffield, Webster	
SF	9 May 1963	Swansea Town	A	1–0	Sheffield	5,300
F-1	27 May 1963	Borough United	A	1–2	Hunt	3,000
F-2	30 May 1963	Borough United	H	0–0		5,605

== League table ==
Pos	Team	Pld	W	D	L	GF	GA	GAv	Pts	Promotion or relegation
18	Oxford United	46	13	15	18	70	71	0.986	41	
19	Stockport County	46	15	11	20	56	70	0.800	41	
20	Newport County	46	14	11	21	76	90	0.844	39	
21	Chester	46	15	9	22	51	66	0.773	39	Re-elected
22	Lincoln City	46	13	9	24	68	89	0.764	35	Re-elected

Source: rsssf.com
