= 1953–54 Newport County A.F.C. season =

Welsh association football club season

Newport County
1953–54 season
- Manager: Billy Lucas
- Stadium: Somerton Park
- Third Division South: 15th
- FA Cup: 1st round
- Welsh Cup: Semi-final
- Top goalscorer: League: Graham (24); All: Graham (28)
- Highest home attendance: 14,800 vs Bristol City (25 December 1953)
- Lowest home attendance: 2,836 vs Aldershot (21 September 1953)
- Average home league attendance: 8,924
Home colours	Away colours

The 1953–54 season was Newport County's seventh consecutive season in the Third Division South since relegation from the Second Division at the end of the 1946–47 season. It was the club's 25th season in the third tier and 26th season overall in the Football League.

== Season review ==
=== Results summary ===
Overall								Home						Away					
Pld	W	D	L	GF	GA	GAv	Pts	W	D	L	GF	GA	Pts	W	D	L	GF	GA	Pts
46	19	6	21	61	81	0.753	44	14	4	5	42	28	32	5	2	16	19	53	12

Source: rsssf.com

=== Results by round ===
Round	1	2	3	4	5	6	7	8	9	10	11	12	13	14	15	16	17	18	19	20	21	22	23	24	25	26	27	28	29	30	31	32	33	34	35	36	37	38	39	40	41	42	43	44	45	46
Ground	H	A	H	H	A	A	H	H	A	A	H	A	A	H	H	A	H	A	H	A	A	H	A	H	H	A	A	A	H	A	H	H	A	A	H	A	H	A	H	A	H	H	A	H	A	H
Result	W	L	L	W	L	L	L	L	L	L	D	L	L	W	L	L	W	L	D	L	D	W	W	W	W	L	W	D	W	L	W	W	L	L	W	W	W	L	D	W	W	W	L	D	W	L
Position	4	16	17	13	16	19	20	23	23	23	23	23	23	24	24	24	23	23	23	23	23	23	22	21	18	22	20	19	18	19	20	18	18	20	19	18	16	18	18	17	17	15	15	14	14	15

Updated to match(es) played on 30 Apr 1954. Source: statto.com
A = Away; H = Home; W = Win; D = Draw; L = Loss

== Fixtures and results ==
=== Third Division South ===
Date	Opponents	Venue	Result	Scorers	Attendance
20 Aug 1953	Reading	H	4–1	Parker 2, Graham, Nelson	10,332
22 Aug 1953	Swindon Town	A	1–7	Parker	13,444
24 Aug 1953	Southampton	H	0–4		8,571
29 Aug 1953	Walsall	H	4–2	Parker 2, Morrey, Graham	3,770
2 Sep 1953	Southampton	A	0–4		14,454
5 Sep 1953	Shrewsbury Town	A	1–2	Graham	11,540
7 Sep 1953	Crystal Palace	H	1–3	Shergold	6,913
12 Sep 1953	Exeter City	H	0–3		6,949
16 Sep 1953	Crystal Palace	A	0–3		8,177
19 Sep 1953	Northampton Town	A	0–1		13,100
21 Sep 1953	Aldershot	H	2–2	Parker, Wharton	2,836
26 Sep 1953	Norwich City	A	0–2		23,856
30 Sep 1953	Aldershot	A	0–2		4,412
3 Oct 1953	Queens Park Rangers	H	2–1	Graham, Parker	6,817
10 Oct 1953	Watford	H	0–1		5,959
17 Oct 1953	Brighton & Hove Albion	A	2–4	Graham 2	15,909
24 Oct 1953	Southend United	H	3–2	Birch, Graham, Morrey	6,958
31 Oct 1953	Reading	A	1–4	Hayward	8,051
7 Nov 1953	Leyton Orient	H	1–1	Hayward	7,740
14 Nov 1953	Millwall	A	1–3	Birch	14,314
28 Nov 1953	Bournemouth & Boscombe Athletic	A	1–1	Wharton	9,190
5 Dec 1953	Coventry City	H	2–1	Waite, Shergold	10,572
12 Dec 1953	Gillingham	A	1–0	Graham	10,004
19 Dec 1953	Swindon Town	H	2–0	Graham, Shergold	9,276
25 Dec 1953	Bristol City	H	3–2	Birch, Graham, Wharton	14,800
26 Dec 1953	Bristol City	A	0–3		24,375
2 Jan 1954	Walsall	A	1–0	Graham	6,187
9 Jan 1954	Colchester United	A	2–2	Graham, Haines	6,434
16 Jan 1954	Shrewsbury Town	H	2–1	Birch, Graham	10,005
23 Jan 1954	Exeter City	A	0–1		8,038
6 Feb 1954	Northampton Town	H	2–0	Graham, Saward	10,191
13 Feb 1954	Norwich City	H	4–1	Graham 3, Lucas	11,968
20 Feb 1954	Queens Park Rangers	A	1–5	Graham	9,315
27 Feb 1954	Watford	A	0–1		12,738
6 Mar 1954	Brighton & Hove Albion	H	1–0	Graham	11,417
13 Mar 1954	Ipswich Town	A	2–1	Graham, Hollyman	12,531
20 Mar 1954	Bournemouth & Boscombe Athletic	H	4–0	Graham, Wharton, Shergold, Saward	10,421
27 Mar 1954	Leyton Orient	A	0–3		9,683
3 Apr 1954	Millwall	H	0–0		9,049
10 Apr 1954	Coventry City	A	2–1	Graham, Shergold	7,940
16 Apr 1954	Torquay United	H	2–0	Graham, Wharton	12,450
17 Apr 1954	Gillingham	H	1–0	Saward	9,409
19 Apr 1954	Torquay United	A	2–3	Wharton 2	6,501
22 Apr 1954	Colchester United	H	1–1	Graham	7,596
24 Apr 1954	Southend United	A	1–0	Graham	5,993
26 Apr 1954	Ipswich Town	H	1–2	Saward	11,258

=== FA Cup ===
Round	Date	Opponents	Venue	Result	Scorers	Attendance
1	21 Nov 1953	Cambridge United	A	2–2	Birch, K.Thomas	7,500
1r	26 Nov 1953	Cambridge United	H	1–2	Parker	7,434

=== Welsh Cup ===
Round	Date	Opponents	Venue	Result	Scorers	Attendance	Notes
5	25 Jan 1954	Swansea Town	H	6–2	Graham 2, Lucas 2, Saward 2	3,971	
6	3 Mar 1954	Bangor City	A	5–1	Wharton 2, Lucas 2, Graham	5,000	
SF	17 Mar 1954	Chester	N	2–2	Graham, Wharton	9,800	At Ninian Park
SFr	5 Apr 1954	Chester	N	0–2		2,927	At The Racecourse Ground

== League table ==
Pos	Team	Pld	W	D	L	GF	GA	GAv	Pts
13	Torquay United	46	17	12	17	81	88	0.920	46
14	Coventry City	46	18	9	19	61	56	1.089	45
15	Newport County	46	19	6	21	61	81	0.753	44
16	Southend United	46	18	7	21	69	71	0.972	43
17	Aldershot	46	17	9	20	74	86	0.860	43

Source: rsssf.com
