= Ralph Hunt (footballer) =

English footballer (1933–1964)

Personal information
- Full name: Ralph Arthur Robert Hunt
- Date of birth: 14 August 1933
- Place of birth: Portsmouth, England
- Date of death: 17 December 1964 (aged 31)
- Place of death: Grantham, England
- Height: 5 ft 11 in (1.80 m)
- Position: Forward

Youth career
- Portsmouth

Senior career*
Years	Team	Apps	(Gls)
1950–1953	Portsmouth	5	(0)
1953–1955	Bournemouth & Boscombe Athletic	33	(7)
1955–1958	Norwich City	124	(67)
1958–1959	Derby County	24	(10)
1959–1961	Grimsby Town	53	(39)
1961	Swindon Town	21	(13)
1961–1962	Port Vale	14	(6)
1962–1964	Newport County	83	(37)
1964	Chesterfield	17	(5)
Total		374	(184)
- * Club domestic league appearances and goals

Ralph Arthur Robert Hunt (14 August 1933 – 17 December 1964) was an English footballer. A prolific forward, he scored 205 goals in 404 league and cup games in a 14-year career in the Football League.

He began his career at Portsmouth before moving on to Bournemouth & Boscombe Athletic in 1953. Two years later, he transferred to Norwich City, and set a club record with 33 goals in a single season. He joined Derby County in 1958 before moving on to Grimsby Town the following year. He switched to Swindon Town in June 1961 before being sold to Port Vale for £3,500 in December 1961. He was sold to Newport County for a £2,000 fee in July 1962. He joined Chesterfield in 1964 but was killed in a car crash in December 1964. Despite his record of scoring a goal every two games in the lower divisions, he never won any major honours and was never promoted.

== Career ==
Hunt began his career at his hometown club Portsmouth, where he only made five First Division appearances in the 1952–53 season. Manager Eddie Lever did not keep him on at Fratton Park, and Hunt moved on to Bournemouth & Boscombe Athletic in February 1954. Jack Bruton's "Cherries" finished 19th in the Third Division South in 1953–54 and then 17th in 1954–55.

He departed Dean Court and signed with league rivals Norwich City in July 1955, who were then managed by Tom Parker. Hunt finished as the club's top-scorer in 1955–56 with 33 goals, which remains a club record. He hit 21 goals in 1956–57 to become the top-scorer for a second successive season, though the Carrow Road club were forced to apply for re-election after finishing bottom of the division. The "Canaries" then improved under the stewardship of Archie Macaulay to post an eighth-place finish in 1957–58, and so were placed in the Third Division the following season following the re-organization of the Football League. He was later inducted into the Norwich City Hall of Fame.

Hunt spent the 1957–58 season in the Second Division with Derby County, as Harry Storer led the "Rams" to a 16th-place finish. Hunt then left the Baseball Ground to join league rivals Grimsby Town in August 1958. The "Mariners" suffered relegation in 1958–59, finishing one point behind Rotherham United, who avoided the drop. Tim Ward replaced Allenby Chilton in charge at Blundell Park but could only take the club up to fourth place in 1959–60, two places and seven points below the promotion places. During the campaign, Hunt finished as the club's top-scorer with 33 goals. The club slipped to sixth in 1960–61, 12 points behind promoted Walsall.

He transferred to Third Division club Swindon Town in a swap deal with Fred Jones in June 1961. He hit 15 goals in 25 league and cup games for Bert Head's "Robins" in 1961–62, but departed the County Ground half-way through the campaign. He joined league rivals Port Vale in December 1961 after manager Norman Low paid out a £3,500 fee. He turned up on a motorbike ten minutes before the kick-off on 16 December, before he got onto the pitch to make his Vale Park debut against Shrewsbury Town – he then scored a hat-trick in what was a 4–1 victory for the "Valiants". Despite securing six goals in 14 games he lost his place in March and was sold to Billy Lucas's Newport County for a £2,000 fee in July 1962.

He finished as the club's top scorer in 1962–63 with 32 goals. He bagged three hat-tricks: the first came in a 6–0 win over Barrow at Somerton Park on 17 September, the second came in a 5–1 win over Crewe Alexandra on 6 October, and the third came in a 6–2 win at Holywell in the Welsh Cup on 17 April. He hit 16 goals in 1963–64, including a hat-trick against Hereford United in the FA Cup first round on 18 November. Despite his scoring exploits, the "Ironsides" still could only finish 20th in the Fourth Division in 1962–63 and 15th in 1963–64.

He signed with Tony McShane's Chesterfield for the 1964–65 season. He scored 10 goals in 21 games at Saltergate before his death in a car accident on 17 December 1964.

Hunt also guested for Gloucester City during his playing career.

== Personal life ==
Hunt grew up in a football family and was the brother of Denis Hunt and the nephew of Douglas Hunt. He died in a car accident on 17 December 1964 at the age of 31. The accident occurred on the return journey to watch cup opponents Peterborough United with teammates Peter Stringfellow (who was driving), Ron Powell and Doug Wragg.

== Career statistics ==
Appearances and goals by club, season and competition
Club	Season	League			FA Cup		League Cup		Total	
Club	Season	Division	Apps	Goals	Apps	Goals	Apps	Goals	Apps	Goals
Portsmouth	1952–53	First Division	2	0	0	0	—		2	0
Portsmouth	1953–54	First Division	3	0	0	0	—		3	0
Portsmouth	Total		5	0	0	0	—		5	0
Bournemouth & Boscombe Athletic	1953–54	Third Division South	8	1	0	0	—		8	1
Bournemouth & Boscombe Athletic	1954–55	Third Division South	25	6	3	1	—		28	7
Bournemouth & Boscombe Athletic	Total		33	7	3	1	—		36	8
Norwich City	1955–56	Third Division South	45	31	3	2	—		48	33
Norwich City	1956–57	Third Division South	43	20	1	1	—		44	21
Norwich City	1957–58	Third Division South	36	16	4	2	—		40	18
Norwich City	Total		124	67	8	5	—		132	72
Derby County	1958–59	Second Division	24	10	0	0	—		24	10
Grimsby Town	1959–60	Third Division	39	33	1	1	—		40	34
Grimsby Town	1960–61	Third Division	14	6	0	0	0	0	14	6
Grimsby Town	Total		53	39	1	1	0	0	54	40
Swindon Town	1961–62	Third Division	21	13	2	1	2	1	25	15
Port Vale	1961–62	Third Division	14	6	—		—		14	6
Newport County	1962–63	Fourth Division	44	27	1	0	3	1	48	28
Newport County	1963–64	Fourth Division	39	10	5	5	1	1	45	16
Newport County	Total		83	37	6	5	4	2	93	44
Chesterfield	1964–65	Fourth Division	17	5	1	0	3	5	21	10
Career total			374	184	21	13	9	8	404	205
