= Ken Wookey =

Ken Wookey may refer to:

- Ken Wookey (footballer, born 1922), Welsh professional footballer
- Ken Wookey (footballer, born 1946), Welsh professional footballer, his son
