= 1968–69 Newport County A.F.C. season =

Welsh association football club season

Newport County
1968–69 season
- Manager: Leslie Graham
- Stadium: Somerton Park
- Fourth Division: 22nd (re-elected)
- FA Cup: 1st round
- League Cup: 1st round
- Welsh Cup: 5th round
- Top goalscorer: League: Buck (13); All: Buck (14)
- Highest home attendance: 6,065 vs Exeter City (FA Cup, 18 Nov 1968)
- Lowest home attendance: 1,192 vs Bradford Park Avenue (2 April 1969)
- Average home league attendance: 2,478
Home colours	Away colours

The 1968–69 season was Newport County's seventh consecutive season in the Football League Fourth Division since relegation at the end of the 1961–62 season and their 41st overall in the Football League. They finished in the re-election places, but were re-elected.

== Season review ==
=== Results summary ===
Overall								Home						Away					
Pld	W	D	L	GF	GA	GAv	Pts	W	D	L	GF	GA	Pts	W	D	L	GF	GA	Pts
46	11	14	21	49	74	0.662	36	9	9	5	31	26	27	2	5	16	18	48	9

Source: rsssf.com

=== Results by round ===
Round	1	2	3	4	5	6	7	8	9	10	11	12	13	14	15	16	17	18	19	20	21	22	23	24	25	26	27	28	29	30	31	32	33	34	35	36	37	38	39	40	41	42	43	44	45	46
Ground	A	H	A	H	H	A	H	H	A	H	A	A	H	A	H	A	A	H	H	A	A	H	A	A	H	A	H	A	H	H	A	H	H	H	A	H	H	H	A	H	H	A	A	A	A	A
Result	L	D	L	D	W	L	W	W	W	L	D	L	W	L	D	D	W	D	L	D	L	D	D	L	W	L	W	D	D	L	L	D	W	D	L	W	L	D	L	L	W	L	L	L	L	L
Position	21	22	24	23	17	19	17	11	9	11	11	13	13	13	15	16	13	12	15	16	17	17	16	17	16	17	17	16	14	15	15	15	13	12	16	14	14	17	20	20	20	20	21	21	22	22

Updated to match(es) played on 8 May 1969. Source: statto.com
A = Away; H = Home; W = Win; D = Draw; L = Loss

== Fixtures and results ==
=== Fourth Division ===
Date	Opponents	Venue	Result	Scorers	Attendance
10 Aug 1968	Grimsby Town	A	0–3		4,746
17 Aug 1968	Workington	H	0–0		3,080
24 Aug 1968	Lincoln City	A	0–1		8,038
26 Aug 1968	Darlington	H	0–0		3,164
31 Aug 1968	Southend United	H	4–1	Buck 2, McLelland, Hill	2,925
7 Sep 1968	Notts County	A	1–3	Hill	3,579
14 Sep 1968	Halifax Town	H	2–0	Hill, McLelland	1,564
16 Sep 1968	Swansea Town	H	2–1	McLelland, Robinson	5,106
21 Sep 1968	Bradford Park Avenue	A	5–1	Buck 5	3,007
28 Sep 1968	Aldershot	H	3–4	McLelland, Buck, Robinson	3,919
5 Oct 1968	Brentford	A	1–1	Buck	7,800
7 Oct 1968	Darlington	A	0–1		8,885
12 Oct 1968	Colchester United	H	1–0	McLelland	3,262
18 Oct 1968	Scunthorpe United	A	0–1		3,238
26 Oct 1968	York City	H	1–1	Buck	2,920
2 Nov 1968	Peterborough United	A	1–1	McLelland	4,792
4 Nov 1968	Rochdale	A	1–0	Hill	4,223
8 Nov 1968	Port Vale	H	0–0		3,137
23 Nov 1968	Chesterfield	H	1–2	Buck	1,776
30 Nov 1968	Bradford City	A	1–1	Hill	5,099
14 Dec 1968	Colchester United	A	1–2	Deacy	3,532
26 Dec 1968	Brentford	H	1–1	McLaughlin	3,750
28 Dec 1968	York City	A	0–0		2,787
4 Jan 1969	Aldershot	A	0–4		6,504
11 Jan 1969	Peterborough United	H	4–2	Buck, Hill, A.Jones, Deacy	1,649
18 Jan 1969	Port Vale	A	0–5		4,040
1 Feb 1969	Exeter City	H	2–1	Buck, Hill	1,427
4 Feb 1969	Doncaster Rovers	A	2–2	McLelland 2	8,321
10 Feb 1969	Rochdale	H	1–1	Wood	2,637
15 Feb 1969	Bradford City	H	1–3	Thomas	2,104
22 Feb 1969	Chester	A	0–4		4,519
24 Feb 1969	Scunthorpe United	H	1–1	Hill	1,504
28 Feb 1969	Grimsby Town	H	2–0	Hill, Hamilton	1,846
3 Mar 1969	Doncaster Rovers	H	0–0		2,649
12 Mar 1969	Exeter City	A	0–2		3,264
15 Mar 1969	Lincoln City	H	2–1	McLaughlin, OG	1,688
17 Mar 1969	Chester	H	2–5	McLelland, Hooper	2,100
29 Mar 1969	Notts County	H	0–0		1,749
7 Apr 1969	Swansea Town	A	2–3	McLelland, Thomas	4,753
8 Apr 1969	Wrexham	H	0–2		1,848
12 Apr 1969	Bradford Park Avenue	H	1–0	Hill	1,192
14 Apr 1969	Wrexham	A	0–4		3,240
19 Apr 1969	Halifax Town	A	0–3		6,445
21 Apr 1969	Chesterfield	A	1–2	Hill	2,402
28 Apr 1969	Southend United	A	0–1		11,905
8 May 1969	Workington	A	2–3	Rowland, Hamilton	1,225

=== FA Cup ===
Round	Date	Opponents	Venue	Result	Scorers	Attendance
1	16 Nov 1968	Exeter City	A	0–0		6,045
1r	18 Nov 1968	Exeter City	H	1–3	Buck	6,065

=== League Cup ===
Round	Date	Opponents	Venue	Result	Scorers	Attendance
1	13 Aug 1968	Bristol City	A	0–2		9,778

=== Welsh Cup ===
Round	Date	Opponents	Venue	Result	Scorers	Attendance
5	14 Jan 1969	Swansea Town	A	0–0		5,173
5r	21 Jan 1969	Swansea Town	H	0–0		3,872
5r2	28 Jan 1969	Swansea Town	A	1–2	Cooper	6,047

== League table ==
Pos	Team	Pld	W	D	L	GF	GA	GAv	Pts	Promotion or relegation
20	Chesterfield	46	13	15	18	43	50	0.860	41	
21	York City	46	14	11	21	53	75	0.707	39	Re-elected
22	Newport County	46	11	14	21	49	74	0.662	36	Re-elected
23	Grimsby Town	46	9	15	22	47	69	0.681	33	Re-elected
24	Bradford (Park Avenue)	46	5	10	31	32	106	0.302	20	Re-elected

Source: rsssf.com
Rules for classification: 1) points; 2) goal average; 3) number of goals scored.

=== Election ===
Votes	Club	Fate
47	Grimsby Town	Re-elected to the League
45	York City	Re-elected to the League
38	Bradford Park Avenue	Re-elected to the League
27	Newport County	Re-elected to the League
16	Cambridge United	Not elected to the League
11	Wigan Athletic	Not elected to the League
3	Kettering Town	Not elected to the League
2	Cambridge City	Not elected to the League
2	Hereford United	Not elected to the League
2	Romford	Not elected to the League
1	Bedford Town	Not elected to the League
1	Chelmsford City	Not elected to the League
1	Worcester City	Not elected to the League
0	Nuneaton Borough	Not elected to the League
0	Wimbledon	Not elected to the League
