= 1967–68 Newport County A.F.C. season =

Welsh association football club season

Newport County
1967–68 season
- Manager: Leslie Graham
- Stadium: Somerton Park
- Fourth Division: 12th
- FA Cup: 3rd round
- League Cup: 2nd round
- Welsh Cup: Semi-final
- Top goalscorer: League: Hill (13); All: Hill (18)
- Highest home attendance: 17,600 vs Southampton (FA Cup, 30 Jan 1968)
- Lowest home attendance: 1,605 vs Exeter City (27 April 1968)
- Average home league attendance: 3,282
Home colours	Away colours

The 1967–68 season was Newport County's sixth consecutive season in the Football League Fourth Division since relegation at the end of the 1961–62 season and their 40th overall in the Football League.

== Season review ==
=== Results summary ===
Overall								Home						Away					
Pld	W	D	L	GF	GA	GAv	Pts	W	D	L	GF	GA	Pts	W	D	L	GF	GA	Pts
46	16	13	17	58	63	0.921	45	11	7	5	32	22	29	5	6	12	26	41	16

Source: rsssf.com

=== Results by round ===
Round	1	2	3	4	5	6	7	8	9	10	11	12	13	14	15	16	17	18	19	20	21	22	23	24	25	26	27	28	29	30	31	32	33	34	35	36	37	38	39	40	41	42	43	44	45	46
Ground	H	A	H	H	A	H	A	A	H	H	A	H	A	A	H	A	A	A	H	H	A	A	H	A	H	A	H	A	H	H	H	A	A	H	A	H	A	A	H	H	A	H	H	H	A	A
Result	D	L	W	W	D	D	D	W	W	W	L	L	L	L	D	L	W	L	D	L	L	L	D	L	W	D	W	W	W	D	W	L	D	L	D	W	W	D	L	L	W	W	D	W	L	L
Position	7	18	11	7	8	8	6	5	5	4	5	9	12	12	12	13	11	13	12	13	15	17	17	18	17	18	16	15	11	14	9	11	12	13	13	13	13	13	13	13	13	12	13	11	12	12

Updated to match(es) played on 11 May 1968. Source: statto.com
A = Away; H = Home; W = Win; D = Draw; L = Loss

== Fixtures and results ==
=== Fourth Division ===
Date	Opponents	Venue	Result	Scorers	Attendance
19 Aug 1967	Rochdale	H	1–1	Melling	4,848
26 Aug 1967	Brentford	A	1–3	Wookey	4,511
2 Sep 1967	Bradford Park Avenue	H	4–0	D.Jones 2, Melling, Hill	3,700
5 Sep 1967	York City	H	2–1	D.Jones, King	4,108
9 Sep 1967	Doncaster Rovers	A	1–1	Hill	6,207
16 Sep 1967	Luton Town	H	1–1	King	4,635
22 Sep 1967	Southend United	A	2–2	King 2	15,389
25 Sep 1967	York City	A	1–0	King	3,072
30 Sep 1967	Wrexham	H	3–2	Melling 3	5,133
3 Oct 1967	Hartlepools United	H	2–0	Melling 2	2,136
7 Oct 1967	Lincoln City	A	1–2	Stark	6,689
14 Oct 1967	Halifax Town	H	0–1		2,657
21 Oct 1967	Bradford City	A	0–3		8,123
23 Oct 1967	Hartlepools United	A	0–2		4,942
31 Oct 1967	Crewe Alexandra	H	0–0		3,004
4 Nov 1967	Notts County	A	1–3	D.Jones	4,456
13 Nov 1967	Bradford Park Avenue	A	2–0	Stark, Thomas	2,991
18 Nov 1967	Chester	A	1–2	Thomas	3,704
21 Nov 1967	Port Vale	H	1–1	A.Smith	2,434
25 Nov 1967	Chesterfield	H	0–3		2,343
2 Dec 1967	Exeter City	A	1–2	Hill	4,208
16 Dec 1967	Rochdale	A	3–4	Hill, Robinson, Buck	1,662
23 Dec 1967	Brentford	H	2–2	Hill, King	2,700
26 Dec 1967	Swansea Town	A	2–4	Hill, A.Jones	12,458
30 Dec 1967	Swansea Town	H	3–0	A.Jones 2, Buck	6,316
20 Jan 1968	Luton Town	A	1–1	Hill	10,992
6 Feb 1968	Southend United	H	2–0	Hill, OG	2,850
10 Feb 1968	Wrexham	A	1–0	Hill	5,544
17 Feb 1968	Barnsley	H	3–0	Wookey, Buck, A.Jones	4,301
24 Feb 1968	Chester	H	1–1	A.Jones	4,370
27 Feb 1968	Doncaster Rovers	H	2–1	Hill, A.Jones	4,642
2 Mar 1968	Halifax Town	A	1–4	King	4,336
9 Mar 1968	Workington	A	1–1	A.Jones	2,838
16 Mar 1968	Bradford City	H	0–3		3,017
23 Mar 1968	Crewe Alexandra	A	1–1	A.Jones	4,378
30 Mar 1968	Notts County	H	1–0	OG	2,040
6 Apr 1968	Port Vale	A	1–0	Buck	3,607
12 Apr 1968	Aldershot	A	0–0		5,411
13 Apr 1968	Lincoln City	H	0–1		2,542
15 Apr 1968	Aldershot	H	0–2		2,180
20 Apr 1968	Chesterfield	A	2–1	Hill, A.Williams	6,200
23 Apr 1968	Darlington	H	1–0	Hill	2,112
27 Apr 1968	Exeter City	H	1–1	Hill	1,605
29 Apr 1968	Workington	H	2–1	King 2	1,813
4 May 1968	Darlington	A	0–1		3,085
11 May 1968	Barnsley	A	2–4	A.Jones 2	12,092

=== FA Cup ===
Round	Date	Opponents	Venue	Result	Scorers	Attendance
1	18 Dec 1967	Gillingham	H	3–0	Hill, A.Williams, King	2,452
2	6 Jan 1968	Guildford City	A	1–0	Buck	8,774
3	27 Jan 1968	Southampton	A	1–1	King	23,789
3r	30 Jan 1968	Southampton	H	2–3	Hill, A.Williams	17,600

=== League Cup ===
Round	Date	Opponents	Venue	Result	Scorers	Attendance
1	22 Aug 1967	Swindon Town	A	1–1	OG	10,870
1r	29 Aug 1967	Swindon Town	H	2–0	D.Jones, King	6,537
2	12 Sep 1967	Blackpool	H	0–1		13,157

=== Welsh Cup ===
Round	Date	Opponents	Venue	Result	Scorers	Attendance
5	3 Feb 1968	Welshpool	A	4–0	Hill 2, Thomas, A.P.Jones	2,200
6	19 Feb 1968	Swansea Town	H	3–1	Thomas, Hill, Buck	7,833
SF	19 Mar 1968	Hereford United	H	0–1		5,100

== League table ==
Pos	Team	Pld	W	D	L	GF	GA	GAv	Pts
10	Doncaster Rovers	46	18	15	13	66	56	1.179	51
11	Halifax Town	46	15	16	15	52	49	1.061	46
12	Newport County	46	16	13	17	58	63	0.921	45
13	Lincoln City	46	17	9	20	71	68	1.044	43
14	Brentford	46	18	7	21	61	64	0.953	43

Source: rsssf.com
Rules for classification: 1) points; 2) goal average; 3) number of goals scored.
