= 1964–65 Newport County A.F.C. season =

Welsh association football club season

Newport County
1964–65 season
- Manager: Billy Lucas
- Stadium: Somerton Park
- Fourth Division: 16th
- FA Cup: 3rd round
- League Cup: 1st round
- Welsh Cup: 5th round
- Top goalscorer: League: Sheffield (27); All: Sheffield (29)
- Highest home attendance: 13,118 vs Reading (FA Cup, 11 Jan 1965)
- Lowest home attendance: 2,421 vs Bradford City (19 March 1964)
- Average home league attendance: 4,008
Home colours	Away colours

The 1964–65 season was Newport County's third consecutive season in the Football League Fourth Division since relegation at the end of the 1961–62 season and their 37th overall in the Football League.

== Season review ==
=== Results summary ===
Overall								Home						Away					
Pld	W	D	L	GF	GA	GAv	Pts	W	D	L	GF	GA	Pts	W	D	L	GF	GA	Pts
46	17	8	21	85	81	1.049	42	14	5	4	54	26	33	3	3	17	31	55	9

Source: rsssf.com

=== Results by round ===
Round	1	2	3	4	5	6	7	8	9	10	11	12	13	14	15	16	17	18	19	20	21	22	23	24	25	26	27	28	29	30	31	32	33	34	35	36	37	38	39	40	41	42	43	44	45	46
Ground	A	A	H	H	A	H	H	A	A	H	H	A	A	A	H	H	A	A	H	H	A	A	H	H	A	H	H	A	H	H	A	H	A	H	A	A	A	H	A	H	H	A	A	H	H	A
Result	W	D	D	D	L	D	W	L	D	W	W	L	L	W	L	W	L	L	W	D	L	D	W	W	L	L	W	L	W	L	L	W	L	D	W	L	L	W	L	L	W	L	L	W	W	L
Position	1	4	8	3	11	10	7	9	10	8	5	9	12	10	10	8	8	10	7	9	10	9	8	8	8	12	11	13	12	14	14	14	14	12	13	13	14	12	14	14	14	15	15	15	14	16

Updated to match(es) played on 24 Apr 1965. Source: statto.com
A = Away; H = Home; W = Win; D = Draw; L = Loss

== Fixtures and results ==
=== Fourth Division ===
Date	Opponents	Venue	Result	Scorers	Attendance
22 Aug 1964	Darlington	A	1–0	Sheffield	4,702
26 Aug 1964	Crewe Alexandra	A	1–1	Singer	4,830
29 Aug 1964	Tranmere Rovers	H	1–1	Singer	5,600
31 Aug 1964	Crewe Alexandra	H	2–2	Smith, Sheffield	5,600
5 Sep 1964	Wrexham	A	2–4	Sheffield, Singer	6,546
7 Sep 1964	Brighton & Hove Albion	H	1–1	Sheffield	6,119
12 Sep 1964	Southport	H	5–0	Sheffield 2, Singer 2, Morgan	4,075
15 Sep 1964	Brighton & Hove Albion	A	0–1		13,980
19 Sep 1964	Bradford Park Avenue	A	2–2	Smith, Sheffield	8,003
26 Sep 1964	Aldershot	H	2–1	Morgan 2	4,242
28 Sep 1964	Notts County	H	3–1	Sheffield 3	5,802
3 Oct 1964	Doncaster Rovers	A	0–1		14,402
8 Oct 1964	Notts County	A	0–1		6,137
10 Oct 1964	Barrow	A	4–1	Morgan 2, Sheffield, Swindells	2,718
12 Oct 1964	Halifax Town	H	0–2		5,315
17 Oct 1964	Hartlepools United	H	2–0	Morgan, Sheffield	3,582
19 Oct 1964	Halifax Town	A	0–2		3,154
24 Oct 1964	Rochdale	A	0–2		4,283
26 Oct 1964	Lincoln City	H	7–0	Morgan 5, Smith, Hill	4,300
31 Oct 1964	Millwall	H	2–2	Swindells, Reece	5,392
7 Nov 1964	Bradford City	A	0–1		3,751
21 Nov 1964	Torquay United	A	2–2	Morgan, Sheffield	4,159
28 Nov 1964	Stockport County	H	2–0	Sheffield 2	3,815
12 Dec 1964	Darlington	H	2–1	Morgan, Swindells	3,023
18 Dec 1964	Tranmere Rovers	A	2–3	Rathbone, Sheffield	7,080
26 Dec 1964	Oxford United	H	0–3		6,730
2 Jan 1965	Wrexham	H	2–0	Rathbone, Sheffield	3,960
16 Jan 1965	Southport	A	3–5	McCole 2, Reece	7,685
23 Jan 1965	Bradford Park Avenue	H	4–3	Reece 2, Smith, Sheffield	3,417
30 Jan 1965	Chester	H	0–1		3,219
6 Feb 1965	Aldershot	A	1–2	Hill	4,101
13 Feb 1965	Doncaster Rovers	H	1–0	Morgan	2,605
17 Feb 1965	Oxford United	A	1–4	Sheffield	6,775
20 Feb 1965	Barrow	H	2–2	Rowland, Reece	2,057
27 Feb 1965	Hartlepools United	A	4–2	Morgan 2, Reece 2	6,375
1 Mar 1965	York City	A	1–5	Pugh	5,773
13 Mar 1965	Millwall	A	0–4		6,705
19 Mar 1965	Bradford City	H	4–2	Hill, Morgan, Sheffield, Reece	2,421
26 Mar 1965	Chester	A	3–4	Sheffield 2, Hill	5,843
29 Mar 1965	Rochdale	H	2–3	Hill, Sheffield	2,761
3 Apr 1965	Torquay United	H	4–0	Sheffield 3, Smith	3,020
10 Apr 1965	Stockport County	A	0–2		4,497
16 Apr 1965	Chesterfield	A	1–2	Hill	7,390
17 Apr 1965	York City	H	2–0	Reece, Sheffield	2,329
19 Apr 1965	Chesterfield	H	4–1	Rathbone, Smith, Reynolds, OG	2,801
24 Apr 1965	Lincoln City	A	3–4	Walters, Rowland, Reynolds	2,296

=== FA Cup ===
Round	Date	Opponents	Venue	Result	Scorers	Attendance
1	14 Nov 1964	Spalding United	H	5–3	Swindells 2, Morgan, Frowen, Reece	4,115
2	5 Dec 1964	Mansfield Town	H	3–0	Sheffield 2, Smith	5,304
3	9 Jan 1965	Reading	A	2–2	Swindelss, Reece	11,998
3r	11 Jan 1965	Reading	H	0–1		13,118

=== League Cup ===
Round	Date	Opponents	Venue	Result	Scorers	Attendance
1	2 Sep 1964	Notts County	A	2–3	Pring, OG	2,881

=== Welsh Cup ===
Round	Date	Opponents	Venue	Result	Scorers	Attendance
5	18 Jan 1965	Swansea Town	H	2–3	Morgan, McCole	5,496

== League table ==
Pos	Team	Pld	W	D	L	GF	GA	GAv	Pts
14	Wrexham	46	17	9	20	84	92	0.913	43
15	Hartlepools United	46	15	13	18	61	85	0.718	43
16	Newport County	46	17	8	21	85	81	1.049	42
17	Darlington	46	18	6	22	84	87	0.966	42
18	Aldershot	46	15	7	24	64	84	0.762	37

Source: rsssf.com
