= 1966–67 Newport County A.F.C. season =

Welsh association football club season

Newport County
1966–67 season
- Manager: Billy Lucas
- Stadium: Somerton Park
- Fourth Division: 18th
- FA Cup: 1st round
- League Cup: 1st round
- Welsh Cup: Semi-final
- Top goalscorer: League: Jones (15); All: Jones (19)
- Highest home attendance: 8,500 vs Cardiff City (15 March 1967)
- Lowest home attendance: 1,222 vs Bradford City (10 April 1967)
- Average home league attendance: 2,885
Home colours	Away colours

The 1966–67 season was Newport County's fifth consecutive season in the Football League Fourth Division since relegation at the end of the 1961–62 season and their 39th overall in the Football League.

== Season review ==
=== Results summary ===
Overall								Home						Away					
Pld	W	D	L	GF	GA	GAv	Pts	W	D	L	GF	GA	Pts	W	D	L	GF	GA	Pts
46	12	16	18	56	63	0.889	40	9	9	5	35	23	27	3	7	13	21	40	13

Source: rsssf.com

=== Results by round ===
Round	1	2	3	4	5	6	7	8	9	10	11	12	13	14	15	16	17	18	19	20	21	22	23	24	25	26	27	28	29	30	31	32	33	34	35	36	37	38	39	40	41	42	43	44	45	46
Ground	A	H	A	A	H	A	A	H	H	A	A	H	H	A	H	H	A	H	A	H	A	H	A	A	H	A	H	H	A	A	A	H	H	A	A	H	H	A	H	H	A	A	H	H	A	H
Result	D	W	L	W	L	D	W	W	W	L	D	D	L	L	W	W	L	D	L	W	D	W	D	L	D	L	L	D	L	L	D	D	D	L	D	D	L	L	D	D	L	W	L	W	L	W
Position	11	4	13	8	13	13	9	5	2	3	3	6	7	10	6	6	7	7	12	11	13	12	10	12	12	13	15	17	18	18	17	17	15	14	16	16	17	18	16	18	20	18	19	17	17	18

Updated to match(es) played on 13 May 1967. Source: statto.com
A = Away; H = Home; W = Win; D = Draw; L = Loss

== Fixtures and results ==
=== Fourth Division ===
Date	Opponents	Venue	Result	Scorers	Attendance
20 Aug 1966	Lincoln City	A	2–2	Jones 2	4,037
27 Aug 1966	Barnsley	H	2–0	OG 2	2,939
3 Sep 1966	Luton Town	A	1–3	Fraser	5,377
5 Sep 1966	Chesterfield	A	1–0	Thomas	7,027
10 Sep 1966	Aldershot	H	1–2	Jones	2,521
17 Sep 1966	Wrexham	A	2–2	Pugh, Rathbone	5,935
19 Sep 1966	Hartlepools United	A	1–0	Jones	4,096
24 Sep 1966	Southend United	H	3–0	Morgan 2, Hill	2,944
26 Sep 1966	Chesterfield	H	4–1	Jones 3, Morgan	5,774
30 Sep 1966	Tranmere Rovers	A	1–2	Jones	5,952
7 Oct 1966	Stockport County	A	0–0		12,041
15 Oct 1966	Rochdale	H	2–2	Jones, Rathbone	4,615
17 Oct 1966	Hartlepools United	H	0–2		5,458
22 Oct 1966	Southport	A	0–1		6,205
24 Oct 1966	Luton Town	H	2–0	Fraser, Morgan	3,451
29 Oct 1966	Notts County	H	1–0	OG	3,670
5 Nov 1966	Chester	A	2–4	Hill, G.Smith	5,257
12 Nov 1966	Bradford Park Avenue	H	0–0		3,139
19 Nov 1966	Port Vale	A	0–2		3,883
10 Dec 1966	York City	H	4–2	Morgan 2, Hill, OG	1,872
26 Dec 1966	Exeter City	A	0–0		7,044
27 Dec 1966	Exeter City	H	3–2	Jones 2, Morgan	4,082
31 Dec 1966	Barnsley	A	1–1	Morgan	7,610
14 Jan 1967	Aldershot	A	0–5		4,403
21 Jan 1967	Wrexham	H	1–1	Wood	2,882
4 Feb 1967	Southend United	A	0–1		7,412
13 Feb 1967	Tranmere Rovers	H	1–2	Jones	2,453
25 Feb 1967	Stockport County	H	1–1	Melling	2,351
4 Mar 1967	Rochdale	A	0–2		2,041
6 Mar 1967	Barrow	A	0–1		5,186
11 Mar 1967	Halifax Town	A	2–2	G.Smith, Melling	3,454
13 Mar 1967	Lincoln City	H	0–0		2,245
18 Mar 1967	Southport	H	0–0		2,300
25 Mar 1967	Crewe Alexandra	A	2–3	G.Smith, Melling	4,690
27 Mar 1967	Brentford	A	1–1	Melling	9,600
28 Mar 1967	Brentford	H	1–1	Bird	2,546
3 Apr 1967	Chester	H	2–3	Jones, A.Williams	2,591
8 Apr 1967	Bradford Park Avenue	A	1–3	Hill	2,724
10 Apr 1967	Bradford City	H	1–1	Reynolds	1,222
17 Apr 1967	Port Vale	H	1–1	G.Smith	1,912
22 Apr 1967	Notts County	A	1–2	Melling	3,455
26 Apr 1967	Bradford City	A	2–1	Wood, Jones	3,825
29 Apr 1967	Barrow	H	0–1		2,263
1 May 1967	Halifax Town	H	3–0	Bird, Morgan, Melling	1,600
5 May 1967	York City	A	1–2	Melling	2,605
13 May 1967	Crewe Alexandra	H	2–1	Jones, A.Williams	1,539

=== FA Cup ===
Round	Date	Opponents	Venue	Result	Scorers	Attendance
1	26 Nov 1966	Brighton & Hove Albion	H	1–2	Thomas	5,000

=== League Cup ===
Round	Date	Opponents	Venue	Result	Scorers	Attendance
1	24 Aug 1966	Swansea Town	H	1–2	Jones	3,816

=== Welsh Cup ===
Round	Date	Opponents	Venue	Result	Scorers	Attendance
5	7 Jan 1967	Llanelly	A	6–2	Jones 3, Pugh, Thomas 2	2,500
6	16 Feb 1967	Bangor City	H	0–0		1,479
6r	22 Feb 1967	Bangor City	A	1–0	Hill	1,500
SF	15 Mar 1967	Cardiff City	H	1–2	Melling	8,500

== League table ==
Pos	Team	Pld	W	D	L	GF	GA	GAv	Pts
16	Barnsley	46	13	15	18	60	64	0.938	41
17	Luton Town	46	16	9	21	59	73	0.808	41
18	Newport County	46	12	16	18	56	63	0.889	40
19	Chester	46	15	10	21	54	78	0.692	40
20	Notts County	46	13	11	22	53	72	0.736	37

Source: rsssf.com
