= 1965–66 Newport County A.F.C. season =

Welsh association football club season

Newport County
1965–66 season
- Manager: Billy Lucas
- Stadium: Somerton Park
- Fourth Division: 9th
- FA Cup: 1st round
- League Cup: 1st round
- Welsh Cup: 6th round
- Top goalscorer: League: Hale (21); All: Hale (24)
- Highest home attendance: 3,985 vs Notts County (25 October 1965)
- Lowest home attendance: 1,700 vs Chester (23 May 1966)
- Average home league attendance: 2,611
Home colours	Away colours

The 1965–66 season was Newport County's fourth consecutive season in the Football League Fourth Division since relegation at the end of the 1961–62 season and their 38th overall in the Football League.

== Season review ==
=== Results summary ===
Overall								Home						Away					
Pld	W	D	L	GF	GA	GAv	Pts	W	D	L	GF	GA	Pts	W	D	L	GF	GA	Pts
46	18	12	16	75	75	1	48	14	6	3	46	24	34	4	6	13	29	51	14

Source: rsssf.com

=== Results by round ===
Round	1	2	3	4	5	6	7	8	9	10	11	12	13	14	15	16	17	18	19	20	21	22	23	24	25	26	27	28	29	30	31	32	33	34	35	36	37	38	39	40	41	42	43	44	45	46
Ground	A	A	H	A	H	H	A	H	A	A	H	A	H	A	H	H	H	A	A	A	H	A	H	A	A	A	A	H	H	A	H	H	H	H	A	A	A	A	H	H	A	H	A	H	H	H
Result	W	L	D	L	W	W	L	W	L	L	W	L	L	D	W	D	W	L	L	D	W	D	L	L	L	D	D	W	W	L	W	D	W	L	L	W	W	D	D	D	W	D	L	W	W	W
Position	9	8	10	14	11	8	13	11	13	15	15	16	17	18	16	14	13	14	15	16	15	14	14	16	17	20	18	15	15	18	16	14	16	17	17	14	15	14	15	14	12	12	13	12	12	9

Updated to match(es) played on 28 May 1966. Source: statto.com
A = Away; H = Home; W = Win; D = Draw; L = Loss

== Fixtures and results ==
=== Fourth Division ===
Date	Opponents	Venue	Result	Scorers	Attendance
21 Aug 1965	Chesterfield	A	2–1	Morgan 2	5,958
25 Aug 1965	Torquay United	A	0–1		7,489
28 Aug 1965	Rochdale	H	1–1	Reynolds	3,673
4 Sep 1965	Luton Town	A	1–2	Morgan	4,899
11 Sep 1965	Barrow	H	3–2	Morgan, Pugh, Reynolds	2,741
13 Sep 1965	Torquay United	H	3–2	Morgan 2, Pugh	3,814
18 Sep 1965	Hartlepools United	A	2–5	Hill, Jones	4,939
25 Sep 1965	Doncaster Rovers	H	4–0	Pugh, Hill, Bird, Williams	2,970
2 Oct 1965	Southport	A	0–2		3,537
6 Oct 1965	Aldershot	A	1–2	Morgan	5,037
9 Oct 1965	Halifax Town	H	3–1	Morgan, Pugh, Jones	2,800
16 Oct 1965	Chester	A	1–6	Morgan	8,027
25 Oct 1965	Notts County	H	1–2	Hill	3,985
30 Oct 1965	Lincoln City	A	1–1	Jones	5,590
8 Nov 1965	Darlington	H	3–0	Rathbone, Pugh, Hale	2,911
19 Nov 1965	Tranmere Rovers	H	0–0		2,516
22 Nov 1965	Aldershot	H	3–1	Bird, Smith, Hale	2,180
27 Nov 1965	Colchester United	A	2–3	Jones, Hale	3,593
11 Dec 1965	Bradford City	A	2–3	Hill, Hale	3,717
31 Dec 1965	Halifax Town	A	4–4	Walters, Smith, Wookey, OG	2,570
8 Jan 1966	Stockport County	H	1–0	Wookey	2,760
15 Jan 1966	Notts County	A	1–1	Hall	4,605
31 Jan 1966	Chesterfield	H	3–4	Reynolds 2, Hale	2,866
5 Feb 1966	Rochdale	A	1–2	Smith	2,167
12 Feb 1966	Bradford Park Avenue	A	1–6	Hale	4,358
26 Feb 1966	Barrow	A	2–2	Morgan, Smith	3,532
2 Mar 1966	Crewe Alexandra	A	2–2	Hale 2	2,751
7 Mar 1966	Bradford Park Avenue	H	3–1	Morgan 2, Tapscott	2,817
12 Mar 1966	Hartlepools United	H	3–0	Morgan, Pugh, Hale	2,250
19 Mar 1966	Doncaster Rovers	A	0–1		12,365
21 Mar 1966	Crewe Alexandra	H	1–0	Hall	2,502
25 Mar 1966	Southport	H	1–1	Morgan	1,997
9 Apr 1966	Barnsley	H	1–0	Reynolds	2,328
11 Apr 1966	Port Vale	H	0–1		2,257
12 Apr 1966	Port Vale	A	0–3		4,496
15 Apr 1966	Tranmere Rovers	A	1–0	Wookey	3,766
25 Apr 1966	Wrexham	A	1–0	Hall	3,106
29 Apr 1966	Barnsley	A	2–2	Jones, Hale	1,697
2 May 1966	Lincoln City	H	0–0		2,176
7 May 1966	Bradford City	H	2–2	Morgan, Hale	1,855
9 May 1966	Darlington	A	1–0	Hale	10,923
16 May 1966	Wrexham	H	2–2	Hale, Pugh	1,884
20 May 1966	Stockport County	A	1–2	Jones	3,586
23 May 1966	Chester	H	3–2	Hale 2, Morgan	1,700
25 May 1966	Luton Town	H	3–1	Hale 2, Morgan	2,173
28 May 1966	Colchester United	H	2–1	Morgan, Hale	2,905

=== FA Cup ===
Round	Date	Opponents	Venue	Result	Scorers	Attendance
1	13 Nov 1965	Bath City	A	0–2		7,330

=== League Cup ===
Round	Date	Opponents	Venue	Result	Scorers	Attendance
1	1 Sep 1965	Southend United	H	2–2	Morgan, Reynolds	2,925
1r	6 Sep 1965	Southend United	A	1–3	Hill	8,644

=== Welsh Cup ===
Round	Date	Opponents	Venue	Result	Scorers	Attendance
5	5 Jan 1966	Hereford United	A	2–1	Bird, Hale	6,000
6	7 Feb 1966	Chester	H	2–2	Hale 2	1,776
6r	16 Feb 1966	Chester	A	0–2		5,296

== League table ==
Pos	Team	Pld	W	D	L	GF	GA	GAv	Pts
7	Chester	46	20	12	14	79	70	1.129	52
8	Notts County	46	19	12	15	61	53	1.151	50
9	Newport County	46	18	12	16	75	75	1.000	48
10	Southport	46	18	12	16	68	69	0.986	48
11	Bradford (Park Avenue)	46	21	5	20	102	92	1.109	47

Source: rsssf.com
