= 1959–60 Newport County A.F.C. season =

Welsh association football club season

Newport County
1959–60 season
- Manager: Billy Lucas
- Stadium: Somerton Park
- Third Division: 13th
- FA Cup: 3rd round
- Welsh Cup: 6th round
- Top goalscorer: League: McSeveney (17); All: McSeveney (21)
- Highest home attendance: 24,000 vs Tottenham Hotspur (9 January 1960)
- Lowest home attendance: 3,314 vs Accrington Stanley (15 April 1960)
- Average home league attendance: 6,528
Home colours	Away colours

The 1959–60 season was Newport County's second consecutive season in the Football League Third Division. It was their 31st season in the third tier and 32nd season overall in the Football League.

== Season review ==
=== Results summary ===
Overall								Home						Away					
Pld	W	D	L	GF	GA	GAv	Pts	W	D	L	GF	GA	Pts	W	D	L	GF	GA	Pts
46	20	6	20	80	79	1.013	46	15	2	6	59	36	32	5	4	14	21	43	14

Source: rsssf.com

=== Results by round ===
Round	1	2	3	4	5	6	7	8	9	10	11	12	13	14	15	16	17	18	19	20	21	22	23	24	25	26	27	28	29	30	31	32	33	34	35	36	37	38	39	40	41	42	43	44	45	46
Ground	A	H	H	A	A	H	H	A	A	A	H	H	A	A	H	H	A	H	A	A	H	H	A	A	A	H	A	A	A	H	H	H	H	A	H	H	A	H	H	A	H	H	A	A	H	A
Result	D	W	L	W	L	W	W	D	D	L	W	W	L	L	W	W	L	W	L	L	W	W	L	L	W	L	L	W	L	W	L	L	W	L	W	D	L	D	W	L	L	L	W	D	W	W
Position	10	5	13	11	14	10	10	5	10	11	9	7	10	13	10	10	11	11	11	13	9	8	10	13	9	13	15	14	14	14	15	16	12	14	12	13	14	14	11	12	15	16	13	15	11	12

Updated to match(es) played on 30 Apr 1960. Source: statto.com
A = Away; H = Home; W = Win; D = Draw; L = Loss

== Fixtures and results ==
=== Third Division ===
Date	Opponents	Venue	Result	Scorers	Attendance
22 Aug 1959	Wrexham	A	0–0		13,251
24 Aug 1959	Reading	H	3–2	Jones 3	8,005
29 Aug 1959	Grimsby Town	H	0–2		8,965
2 Sep 1959	Reading	A	1–0	Jones	14,332
5 Sep 1959	Queens Park Rangers	A	0–3		10,700
7 Sep 1959	Tranmere Rovers	H	2–1	Jones, McPherson	7,826
12 Sep 1959	Bradford City	H	2–0	Riggs, McSeveney	7,634
14 Sep 1959	Tranmere Rovers	A	2–2	Sherwood, Jones	13,924
19 Sep 1959	Coventry City	A	1–1	McSeveney	18,251
23 Sep 1959	Bournemouth & Boscombe Athletic	A	1–4	W.Herrity	9,322
26 Sep 1959	York City	H	3–2	McSeveney, Meyer, Sherwood	8,067
28 Sep 1959	Bournemouth & Boscombe Athletic	H	5–2	Sherwood, Riggs, Jones, McPherson, Herrity	9,623
3 Oct 1959	Swindon Town	A	0–1		14,685
10 Oct 1959	Shrewsbury Town	A	2–6	W.Herrity, Meyer	9,062
12 Oct 1959	Chesterfield	H	3–1	W.Herrity 2, McPherson	8,217
19 Oct 1959	Port Vale	H	4–3	McPherson 2, Meyer, McSeveney	8,996
24 Oct 1959	Norwich City	A	0–1		24,140
31 Oct 1959	Barnsley	H	4–0	McSeveney 2, Morgan 2	8,430
7 Nov 1959	Colchester United	A	1–2	McSeveney	6,620
21 Nov 1959	Mansfield Town	A	1–3	Sherwood	6,996
28 Nov 1959	Halifax Town	H	5–1	McSeveney 4, Meyer	7,558
12 Dec 1959	Brentford	H	4–2	Meyer 2, Dixon, McSeveney	8,401
26 Dec 1959	Southampton	A	0–2		19,167
1 Jan 1960	Chesterfield	A	0–2		5,900
2 Jan 1960	Grimsby Town	A	1–0	McSeveney	9,188
16 Jan 1960	Queens Park Rangers	H	2–3	Dixon, McSeveney	5,180
23 Jan 1960	Bradford City	A	2–6	Singer 2	10,838
30 Jan 1960	Bury	A	1–0	Singer	6,545
12 Feb 1960	York City	A	0–2		7,758
15 Feb 1960	Coventry City	H	2–0	Dixon, McPherson	4,764
20 Feb 1960	Swindon Town	H	1–3	Hollyman	4,979
27 Feb 1960	Shrewsbury Town	H	1–3	Sherwood	4,738
29 Feb 1960	Wrexham	H	4–1	McPherson 2, Sherwood, McSeveney	4,206
5 Mar 1960	Port Vale	A	1–2	McSeveney	9,073
7 Mar 1960	Southampton	H	5–1	McPherson 3, Morgan, Meyer	6,429
12 Mar 1960	Norwich City	H	1–1	McPherson	6,106
19 Mar 1960	Halifax Town	A	1–2	McSeveney	4,409
21 Mar 1960	Southend United	H	1–1	Singer	5,652
26 Mar 1960	Colchester United	H	3–2	McPherson 2, Singer	4,322
2 Apr 1960	Southend United	A	2–3	McPherson, Sherwood	8,513
9 Apr 1960	Mansfield Town	H	0–1		4,473
15 Apr 1960	Accrington Stanley	H	1–3	McPherson	3,314
16 Apr 1960	Barnsley	A	2–0	Dixon, Meyer	5,597
18 Apr 1960	Accrington Stanley	A	0–0		2,202
23 Apr 1960	Bury	H	3–1	Dixon, Singer, Meyer	4,264
30 Apr 1960	Brentford	A	2–1	Dixon, Burton	7,900

=== FA Cup ===
Round	Date	Opponents	Venue	Result	Scorers	Attendance
1	14 Nov 1959	Hereford United	H	4–2	Dixon, McPherson, McSeveney, Meyer	10,391
2	5 Dec 1959	Salisbury City	A	1–0	Meyer	6,600
3	9 Jan 1960	Tottenham Hotspur	H	0–4		24,000

=== Welsh Cup ===
Round	Date	Opponents	Venue	Result	Scorers	Attendance
5	3 Feb 1960	Caerau Athletic	A	5–3	McSeveney 3, Dixon, Jones	
6	24 Feb 1960	Wrexham	A	0–3		

== League table ==
Pos	Team	Pld	W	D	L	GF	GA	GAv	Pts
11	Reading	46	18	10	18	84	77	1.091	46
12	Southend United	46	19	8	19	76	74	1.027	46
13	Newport County	46	20	6	20	80	79	1.013	46
14	Port Vale	46	19	8	19	80	79	1.013	46
15	Halifax Town	46	18	10	18	70	72	0.972	46
