= 1963–64 Newport County A.F.C. season =

Welsh association football club season

Newport County
1963–64 season
- Manager: Billy Lucas
- Stadium: Somerton Park
- Fourth Division: 15th
- FA Cup: 4th round
- Football League Cup: 1st round
- Welsh Cup: Semi-final
- Top goalscorer: League: Bonson (25); All: Bonson (32)
- Highest home attendance: 8,928 vs Sheffield Wednesday (FA Cup, 4 January 1964)
- Lowest home attendance: 1,800 vs Tranmere Rovers (25 April 1964)
- Average home league attendance: 3,746
Home colours	Away colours

The 1963–64 season was Newport County's second consecutive season in the Football League Fourth Division since relegation at the end of the 1961–62 season and their 36th overall in the Football League.

== Season review ==
=== Results summary ===
Overall								Home						Away					
Pld	W	D	L	GF	GA	GAv	Pts	W	D	L	GF	GA	Pts	W	D	L	GF	GA	Pts
46	17	8	21	64	73	0.877	42	12	3	8	35	24	27	5	5	13	29	49	15

Source: rsssf.com

=== Results by round ===
Round	1	2	3	4	5	6	7	8	9	10	11	12	13	14	15	16	17	18	19	20	21	22	23	24	25	26	27	28	29	30	31	32	33	34	35	36	37	38	39	40	41	42	43	44	45	46
Ground	A	A	H	A	H	H	A	A	H	H	A	H	H	A	A	H	H	A	H	H	A	H	A	A	H	H	A	H	A	A	A	H	H	A	H	A	A	H	H	A	A	H	A	A	H	H
Result	D	W	W	L	W	D	W	D	D	L	L	W	L	L	L	D	W	W	L	L	L	W	W	L	W	L	L	W	W	D	L	L	W	L	L	L	L	W	W	L	D	W	D	L	W	L
Position	10	3	2	8	2	5	1	2	2	3	9	3	7	10	14	13 December 2011	15	18	18	16	15	15	14	16	17	17	15	16	16	17	15	18	19	20	20	19	18	19	18	16	17	17	15	15		

Updated to match(es) played on 30 Apr 1964. Source: statto.com
A = Away; H = Home; W = Win; D = Draw; L = Loss

== Fixtures and results ==
=== Fourth Division ===
Date	Opponents	Venue	Result	Scorers	Attendance
24 Aug 1963	Doncaster Rovers	A	1–1	Smith	6,040
26 Aug 1963	Bradford Park Avenue	A	5–2	Sheffield 3, Bonson, Hunt	6,312
31 Aug 1963	Brighton & Hove Albion	H	2–0	Smith, Pring	6,200
7 Sep 1963	Chester	A	0–3		5,372
9 Sep 1963	Bradford Park Avenue	H	4–0	Sheffield 2, Bonson, Pring	4,537
14 Sep 1963	York City	H	0–0		5,200
16 Sep 1963	Chesterfield	A	1–0	Hunt	7,474
21 Sep 1963	Barrow	A	1–1	Pring	4,137
28 Sep 1963	Rochdale	H	1–1	Smith	4,878
30 Sep 1963	Chesterfield	H	0–1		5,866
5 Oct 1963	Oxford United	A	1–2	Hunt	6,144
7 Oct 1963	Bradford City	H	3–1	Bonson 2, Hunt	4,972
12 Oct 1963	Carlisle United	H	1–4	Bonson	5,489
16 Oct 1963	Bradford City	A	1–2	Bonson	3,371
19 Oct 1963	Torquay United	A	3–8	Bonson 2, Hunt	4,274
21 Oct 1963	Workington	H	0–0		3,381
26 Oct 1963	Halifax Town	H	4–2	Smith, Bonson, Hunt, Webster	3,182
2 Nov 1963	Tranmere Rovers	A	3–2	Bonson, Hunt, Webster	5,090
9 Nov 1963	Darlington	H	1–2	Bonson	3,388
23 Nov 1963	Exeter City	H	0–1		3,339
30 Nov 1963	Southport	A	2–4	Bonson, Hunt	2,830
14 Dec 1963	Doncaster Rovers	H	1–0	Sheffield	2,344
21 Dec 1963	Brighton & Hove Albion	A	2–1	Bonson 2	7,752
26 Dec 1963	Aldershot	A	0–2		5,763
28 Dec 1963	Aldershot	H	2–1	Hunt, Webster	3,666
11 Jan 1964	Chester	H	0–1		3,983
18 Jan 1964	York City	A	0–3		2,114
3 Feb 1964	Barrow	H	3–0	Bonson 2, Smith	3,274
8 Feb 1964	Rochdale	A	1–0	Bonson	2,444
22 Feb 1964	Carlisle United	A	3–3	Sheffield 2, Bonson	7,528
24 Feb 1964	Workington	A	0–2		3,800
29 Feb 1964	Torquay United	H	0–3		4,018
2 Mar 1964	Oxford United	H	1–0	Sheffield	3,142
7 Mar 1964	Halifax Town	A	0–2		2,790
14 Mar 1964	Tranmere Rovers	H	0–2		1,800
23 Mar 1964	Darlington	A	1–3	Sheffield	2,836
27 Mar 1964	Stockport County	A	0–1		2,890
28 Mar 1964	Lincoln City	H	4–2	Rowland, Sheffield, Hunt, Hill	2,300
30 Mar 1964	Stockport County	H	3–1	Reynolds 2, Smith	2,966
4 Apr 1964	Exeter City	A	1–3	Reynolds	6,077
6 Apr 1964	Hartlepools United	A	1–1	Bonson	3,844
11 Apr 1964	Southport	H	3–0	Bonson 3	2,492
18 Apr 1964	Gillingham	A	1–1	Sheffield	9,854
22 Apr 1964	Lincoln City	A	1–2	Bonson	2,803
25 Apr 1964	Hartlepools United	H	2–1	Bonson 2	2,521
30 Apr 1964	Gillingham	H	0–1		3,229

=== FA Cup ===
Round	Date	Opponents	Venue	Result	Scorers	Attendance
1	16 Nov 1963	Hereford United	A	1–1	Hunt	7,000
1r	18 Nov 1963	Hereford United	H	4–0	Hunt 3, Webster	3,457
2	7 Dec 1963	Watford	H	2–0	Smith	5,353
3	4 Jan 1964	Sheffield Wednesday	H	3–2	Bonson 2, Hunt	8,928
4	25 Jan 1964	Burnley	A	1–2	Sheffield 38'	23,019

=== Football League Cup ===
Round	Date	Opponents	Venue	Result	Scorers	Attendance
1	4 Sep 1963	Millwall	H	3–4	Bonson, Hunt, OG	3,168

=== Welsh Cup ===
Round	Date	Opponents	Venue	Result	Scorers	Attendance	Notes
5	30 Jan 1964	Haverfordwest County	H	5–2	Bonson 3, Bird, Sheffield	1,773	
6	20 Feb 1964	Swansea Town	H	1–0	Sheffield	5,950	
SF	11 Mar 1964	Cardiff City	N	2–2	Sheffield, Bonson	5,200	At Swansea
SFr	25 Mar 1964	Cardiff City	A	0–1		8,400	

== League table ==
Pos	Team	Pld	W	D	L	GF	GA	GAv	Pts
13	Bradford (Park Avenue)	46	18	9	19	75	81	0.926	45
14	Doncaster Rovers	46	15	12	19	70	75	0.933	42
15	Newport County	46	17	8	21	64	73	0.877	42
16	Chesterfield	46	15	12	19	57	71	0.803	42
17	Stockport County	46	15	12	19	50	68	0.735	42

Source: rsssf.com
