= Wilf Smith (footballer, born 1918) =

English footballer

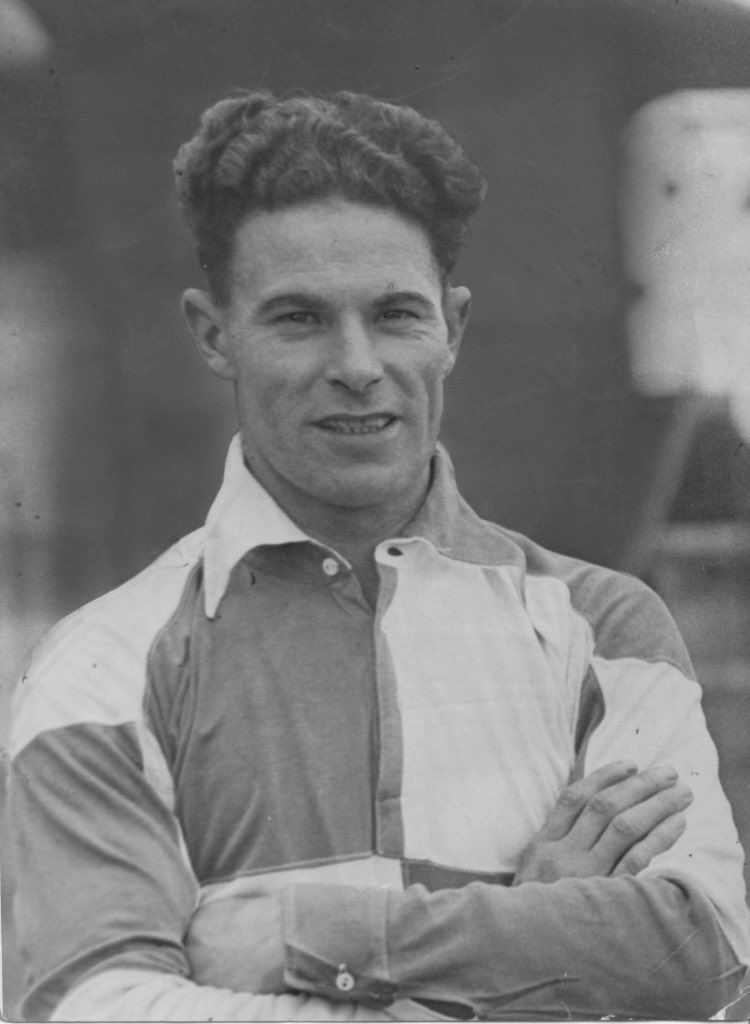
- Smith with Bristol Rovers.

Personal information
- Full name: Wilfred Victor Smith
- Date of birth: 7 April 1918
- Place of birth: Pucklechurch, England
- Date of death: 14 April 1968 (aged 50)
- Place of death: Pucklechurch, England
- Height: 5 ft 10 in (1.78 m)
- Position: Full back

Senior career*
Years	Team	Apps	(Gls)
- Clevedon Town
1937–1946	Bristol Rovers	26	(0)
1946–1948	Newport County	9	(0)
- Abergavenny Thursdays
Total		35	(0)
- * Club domestic league appearances and goals

Wilfred Smith (7 April 1918 – 14 April 1968) was an English professional footballer who played as a full back.

== Career ==
Smith began his career as an amateur with Clevedon Town before turning professional with Bristol Rovers. Smith spent ten years at Rovers and, because League football was suspended due to the Second World War, only made a total of 26 appearances in the Football League for them. Smith signed for Newport County in December 1946 in a swap deal involving Ken Wookey. At Newport, Smith made a further 9 League appearances. Smith later played in Wales with Abergavenny Thursdays.
