= Ken Wookey (footballer, born 1922) =

Welsh footballer

Personal information
- Full name: Kenneth William Wookey
- Date of birth: 23 February 1922
- Place of birth: Newport, Wales
- Date of death: 11 January 2003 (aged 80)
- Place of death: Newport, Wales
- Position: Winger

Youth career
- 1939–1946: Newport County

Senior career*
| Years | Team | Apps | (Gls) |
| 1946 | Newport County | 14 | (2) |
| 1946–1948 | Bristol Rovers | 54 | (9) |
| 1948–1950 | Swansea Town | 13 | (0) |
| 1950 | Hereford United | ? | (?) |
| 1950–1952 | Ipswich Town | 15 | (1) |
| Total | | 96 | (12) |
- * Club domestic league appearances and goals

Kenneth William Wookey (23 February 1922 – 11 January 2003) was a Welsh professional footballer who played as a winger.

== Career ==
Born in Newport, Wookey began his professional career with his hometown club Newport County, where he made a total of 14 appearances in the English Football League. Wookey left Newport in December 1946 to join Bristol Rovers, in a swap deal involving Wilf Smith. Over the next two seasons, Wookey made 54 appearances in the League for Bristol. Wookey's next team was Swansea Town, where he spent two seasons, making 13 appearances in the League. After a brief spell in non-League football with Hereford United, Wookey spent one final season in the League with Ipswich Town, making 15 appearances.

Wookey also represented Wales at schoolboy level.

== Personal life ==
His son, also named Ken, was also a professional footballer.
