= Granville Smith =

Welsh footballer (1937–2024)

Personal information
- Date of birth: 4 February 1937
- Place of birth: Penrhiwceiber, Wales
- Date of death: 22 August 2024 (aged 87)
- Position: Winger

Senior career*
Years	Team	Apps	(Gls)
1958–1960	Bristol Rovers	21	(2)
1960–1968	Newport County	241	(38)
- Bath City
Total		261	(39)
- * Club domestic league appearances and goals

Granville Smith (4 February 1937 – 22 August 2024) was a Welsh professional footballer. A speedy winger, he joined Newport County in 1960 from Bristol Rovers. He went on to make 241 Football League appearances for Newport scoring 38 goals. In 1968, he joined Bath City.

Following his retirement, Smith continued to live in Newport, working as a boiler attendant. He died on 22 August 2024, at the age of 87.
