= Wilfred Smith (footballer) =

English footballer

Personal information
- Full name: Wilfred Smith
- Date of birth: 28 March 1910
- Place of birth: Sheffield, England
- Position: Full back

Senior career*
Years	Team	Apps	(Gls)
1932–1933	Blackpool	1	(0)
1933–1934	Rotherham United	26	(0)
1934–1935	Burnley	29	(0)
1935–1936	Crystal Palace	2	(0)
Total		58	(0)
- * Club domestic league appearances and goals

Wilfred Smith (28 March 1910 – after 1935) was an English professional footballer. He played as a full back.

== Blackpool ==
Smith made his sole appearance for Blackpool in a 4–2 defeat to West Bromwich Albion at Bloomfield Road on 3 September 1932.
