= Leslie Graham (footballer) =

English footballer and manager

Les Graham
Personal information
- Full name: Leslie Graham
- Date of birth: 14 May 1924
- Place of birth: Flixton, Lancashire, England
- Date of death: 1998 (aged 73–74)
- Position: Inside forward

Youth career
- Flixton

Senior career*
Years	Team	Apps	(Gls)
1947–1952	Blackburn Rovers	150	(42)
1952–1955	Newport County	96	(39)
1955–1957	Watford	90	(26)
1957–1959	Newport County	64	(15)
1959-1960	Cambridge City	9	(4)
Total		400	(122)

Managerial career
- 1963-1964: Merthyr Tydfil
- 1967-1969: Newport County
- * Club domestic league appearances and goals

Leslie "Les" Graham (14 May 1924 – 1998) was an English professional footballer and manager.

An inside-forward, Graham began his career at Blackburn Rovers where he made 150 Football League appearances. He joined Newport County in 1952 and made 96 appearances, scoring 39 goals. Graham joined Watford in 1955 but later returned to Newport in 1957 making a further 64 appearances, scoring 15 goals. In 1959 he joined Cambridge City, but only stayed at Milton Road until October 1959.

Player-Manager at Merthyr Tydfil during the 1963–64 season, in 1967, he was appointed manager of Newport County and he retained the position until 1969.
