= 1961–62 Newport County A.F.C. season =

Welsh association football club season

Newport County
1961–62 season
- Manager: Bobby Evans
- Third Division: 24th (relegated)
- FA Cup: 2nd round
- Football League Cup: 1st round
- Welsh Cup: 5th round
- Top goalscorer: League: G.Smith (9); All: G.Smith/G.Harris (9)
- Highest home attendance: 11,027 vs Grimsby Town (19 August 1961)
- Lowest home attendance: 2,003 vs Shrewsbury Town (16 April 1962)
- Average home league attendance: 5,004
Home colours	Away colours

The 1961–62 season was Newport County's fourth consecutive season in the Football League Third Division since the end of regionalisation in 1958. It was their 33rd season in the third tier and 34th competitive season overall in the Football League.

== Season review ==
=== Results summary ===
Overall								Home						Away					
Pld	W	D	L	GF	GA	GAv	Pts	W	D	L	GF	GA	Pts	W	D	L	GF	GA	Pts
46	7	8	31	46	102	0.451	22	6	5	12	29	38	17	1	3	19	17	64	5

Source: rsssf.com

=== Results by round ===
Round	1	2	3	4	5	6	7	8	9	10	11	12	13	14	15	16	17	18	19	20	21	22	23	24	25	26	27	28	29	30	31	32	33	34	35	36	37	38	39	40	41	42	43	44	45	46
Ground	H	H	A	A	H	A	A	A	H	H	A	H	H	A	A	H	H	A	A	A	H	H	A	A	H	A	A	A	H	A	H	A	H	A	H	H	H	A	H	H	A	H	H	A	A	H
Result	L	L	L	D	W	W	L	D	L	L	L	L	L	L	D	W	L	L	L	L	L	D	L	L	L	L	L	L	L	L	W	L	L	L	D	W	D	L	W	D	L	D	W	L	L	L
Position	20	21	22	22	18	15	16	19	19	21	23	23	24	24	23	23	23	23	24	24	24	24	24	24	24	24	24	24	24	24	24	24	24	24	24	24	24	24	24	24	24	24	24	24	24	24

Updated to match(es) played on 8 Apr 1962. Source: statto.com
A = Away; H = Home; W = Win; D = Draw; L = Loss

== Fixtures and results ==
=== Third Division ===
Date	Opponents	Venue	Result	Scorers	Attendance
19 Aug 1961	Grimsby Town	H	0–2		11,027
21 Aug 1961	Barnsley	H	0–2		8,727
25 Aug 1961	Coventry City	A	0–3		12,675
30 Aug 1961	Barnsley	A	1–1	Bowman	6,901
2 Sep 1961	Brentford	H	6–1	Buchanan 3, Robertson 2, Bowman	5,757
5 Sep 1961	Bristol City	A	2–1	Bowman, Smith	15,588
8 Sep 1961	Reading	A	1–2	Robertson	17,441
16 Sep 1961	Portsmouth	A	2–2	Bowman, Buchanan	14,006
18 Sep 1961	Bradford Park Avenue	H	1–2	Robertson	10,458
23 Sep 1961	Southend United	H	0–3		6,407
30 Sep 1961	Notts County	A	1–8	Harris	6,356
2 Oct 1961	Peterborough United	H	2–3	Smith, W.Herrity	9,027
7 Oct 1961	Queens Park Rangers	H	2–4	Bowman, Harris	5,440
9 Oct 1961	Peterborough United	A	1–2	Finlay	13,029
14 Oct 1961	Halifax Town	A	0–0		5,161
16 Oct 1961	Bristol City	H	3–1	Harris 3	7,006
21 Oct 1961	Bournemouth & Boscombe Athletic	H	0–1		7,392
25 Oct 1961	Bradford Park Avenue	A	1–4	Smith	9,370
28 Oct 1961	Crystal Palace	A	0–2		17,885
11 Nov 1961	Northampton Town	A	0–5		7,845
18 Nov 1961	Hull City	H	0–2		5,089
2 Dec 1961	Swindon Town	H	2–2	Smith 2	4,506
9 Dec 1961	Torquay United	A	2–3	Buchanan, Walsh	4,065
16 Dec 1961	Grimsby Town	A	0–1		4,575
23 Dec 1961	Coventry City	H	1–2	Robertson	3,360
26 Dec 1961	Port Vale	A	0–3		12,182
13 Jan 1962	Brentford	A	1–3	Smith	7,750
27 Jan 1962	Watford	A	1–3	Smith	8,167
5 Feb 1962	Portsmouth	H	0–5		5,655
10 Feb 1962	Southend United	A	0–1		6,175
17 Feb 1962	Notts County	H	2–0	Harris, Moffat	2,597
24 Feb 1962	Queens Park Rangers	A	0–4		7,697
5 Mar 1962	Halifax Town	H	0–1		2,956
10 Mar 1962	Bournemouth & Boscombe Athletic	A	1–2	Bowman	10,610
12 Mar 1962	Port Vale	H	1–1	Moffat	2,504
17 Mar 1962	Crystal Palace	H	2–1	Buchanan, Smith	2,276
19 Mar 1962	Reading	H	0–0		2,639
23 Mar 1962	Lincoln City	A	2–3	Walsh 2	5,359
26 Mar 1962	Lincoln City	H	4–0	Moffat 2, Buchanan, Harris	3,062
31 Mar 1962	Northampton Town	H	0–0		2,568
7 Apr 1962	Hull City	A	0–4		3,235
14 Apr 1962	Watford	H	0–0		2,346
16 Apr 1962	Shrewsbury Town	H	3–2	Smith, Harris, Moffat	2,003
21 Apr 1962	Swindon Town	A	0–3		7,881
23 Apr 1962	Shrewsbury Town	A	1–4	W.Herrity	6,650
8 Apr 1962	Torquay United	H	0–3		2,295

=== FA Cup ===
Round	Date	Opponents	Venue	Result	Scorers	Attendance
1	4 Nov 1961	Reading	A	1–1	W.Herrity	10,564
1r	6 Nov 1961	Reading	H	1–0	W.Herrity	8,548
2	25 Nov 1961	Weymouth	A	0–1		6,500

=== Football League Cup ===
Round	Date	Opponents	Venue	Result	Scorers	Attendance
1	11 Sep 1961	Shrewsbury Town	H	0–0		7,500
1r	28 Sep 1961	Shrewsbury Town	A	1–3	Bowman	8,213

=== Welsh Cup ===
Round	Date	Opponents	Venue	Result	Scorers	Attendance
5	30 Jan 1962	Cardiff City	A	1–4	Harris	5,715

== League table ==
Pos	Team	Pld	W	D	L	GF	GA	GAv	Pts	Promotion or relegation
20	Barnsley	46	13	12	21	71	95	0.747	38	
21	Torquay United (R)	46	15	6	25	76	100	0.760	36	Relegation to the Fourth Division
22	Lincoln City (R)	46	9	17	20	57	87	0.655	35	Relegation to the Fourth Division
23	Brentford (R)	46	13	8	25	53	93	0.570	34	Relegation to the Fourth Division
24	Newport County (R)	46	7	8	31	46	102	0.451	22	Relegation to the Fourth Division

(R) Relegated
