= Billy Lucas =

Welsh footballer

Personal information
- Full name: William Henry Lucas
- Date of birth: 15 January 1918
- Place of birth: Newport, Wales
- Date of death: 1998 (aged 79–80)
- Place of death: Wales
- Position: Wing half

Senior career*
Years	Team	Apps	(Gls)
1936–1937	Wolverhampton Wanderers	0	(0)
1937–1948	Swindon Town	141	(32)
1943–1945	→ Lovell's_Athletic (guest)		
1948–1953	Swansea Town	205	(35)
1953–1958	Newport County	93	(6)

International career
1948–1950	Wales	7	(0)

Managerial career
- 1953–1961: Newport County
- 1962–1967: Newport County
- 1967–1969: Swansea Town
- 1970–1974: Newport County
- * Club domestic league appearances and goals

William Henry Lucas (15 January 1918 – 1998) was a Welsh international footballer in the late 1940s and 1950s. During his career, Lucas made over 400 appearances in The Football League during spells with Swindon Town, Swansea Town and Newport County and attained seven caps for Wales as well as eight wartime caps. After his retirement from playing, he went on to manage two of his former clubs, Newport County and Swansea Town.

== Playing career ==
=== Club ===
A wing half, he began his career with Wolverhampton Wanderers but left the club without making an appearance. Lucas instead joined Swindon Town where he established himself in the first team. His spell with the club was interrupted by the outbreak of World War II and, after just over one season with club following the return of The Football League in 1946, Swansea Town manager Billy McCandless paid a then club record fee of £11,000 to bring him to Vetch Field. In his first season, he captained the side to the Division Three South title and in following years also won two Welsh Cup's. In December 1953 he joined Newport County as player-manager and made 93 appearances for Newport scoring 6 goals.

During the war he was a guest-player for Lovell's Athletic, the works team for Lovell's sweet factory in Newport, Monmouthshire, Wales.

=== International ===
Lucas' first participation for Wales came in a wartime international match against England at Ninian Park on 9 May 1942, scoring the only goal of the game in a 1–0 victory. He went on to play in a further seven wartime matches for Wales before winning his first full cap on 23 October 1948 in a 3–1 defeat to Scotland in the 1949 British Home Championship. He gained a total of seven caps for Wales, his final appearance coming on 15 November 1950 in a 4–2 defeat to England.

== Managerial career ==
Following his retirement from playing, Lucas became full-time manager of Newport County until 1961 when he resigned due to a lack of support and what he perceived as a general apathy surrounding the club. He returned to the club a year later following the sacking of Bobby Evans after they finished bottom of the Third Division and spent another five years in charge before taking over at Swansea Town. Lucas later took charge of Newport for a third and final spell in 1970, working without wages for the first six months due to financial problems at the club, which lasted until 1974.

=== Managerial statistics ===
Team	Country	From	To	Record				
Team	Country	From	To	G	W	D	L	Win %
Swansea Town	Wales	February 1967	March 1969	96	33	24	39	34.38
Total				96	33	24	39	34.38

== Outside football ==
In 1951, following his move back to South Wales to join Swansea Town, Lucas took over the Black Horse Inn, in Newport, with his wife Edith.

== Honours ==
Swansea City

- Football League Third Division South Winner: 1

1948–49

- Welsh Cup Winner: 1

1950
