= 1997–98 Norwich City F.C. season =

Norwich City
1997–98 season
- Chairman: Barry Lockwood
- Manager: Mike Walker (until 30 April); John Faulkner (caretaker from 30 April)
- Stadium: Carrow Road
- First Division: 15th
- FA Cup: Third round
- League Cup: First round
- Top goalscorer: Bellamy (13)
- Average home league attendance: 14,444
Home colours

During the 1997–98 English football season, Norwich City F.C. competed in the Football League First Division.

== Season summary ==
In the 1997–98 season, Norwich had a season of two halves where they had a satisfying first season in which the Canaries were lying in 12th place and 9 points adrift from the playoffs but from the end of January, Norwich went on a poor run of 14 games without a win with only 7 points picked up during that spell and also resulted in Walker resigning at the end of April and ended up finishing in a disappointing 15th place.

== Final league table ==
Pos	Team	Pld	W	D	L	GF	GA	GD	Pts
13	Bradford City	46	14	15	17	46	59	−13	57
14	Tranmere Rovers	46	14	14	18	54	57	−3	56
15	Norwich City	46	14	13	19	52	69	−17	55
16	Huddersfield Town	46	14	11	21	50	72	−22	53
17	Bury	46	11	19	16	42	58	−16	52

Source: Statto.com
Rules for classification: 1) Points; 2) Goals scored; 3) Goal difference

== Results ==
Norwich City's score comes first

=== Legend ===
Win	Draw	Loss

=== Football League First Division ===
Date	Opponent	Venue	Result	Attendance	Scorers
9 August 1997	Wolverhampton Wanderers	H	0–2	17,230	
15 August 1997	Nottingham Forest	A	1–4	16,524	O'Neill
23 August 1997	Crewe Alexandra	H	0–2	11,821	
30 August 1997	Sunderland	A	1–0	29,204	Sutch
2 September 1997	Portsmouth	A	1–1	10,577	Adams
13 September 1997	Port Vale	H	1–0	11,269	Fleck
17 September 1997	Charlton Athletic	H	0–4	10,157	
20 September 1997	Manchester City	A	2–1	27,258	Adams, Coote
26 September 1997	Ipswich Town	H	2–1	18,911	Eadie, Cundy (own goal)
4 October 1997	Tranmere Rovers	A	0–2	6,674	
18 October 1997	Stockport County	H	1–1	12,689	Eadie
21 October 1997	Reading	H	0–0	17,781	
25 October 1997	Swindon Town	A	0–1	9,256	
1 November 1997	Bury	H	2–2	14,419	Bellamy, Adams
4 November 1997	West Bromwich Albion	A	0–1	13,949	
8 November 1997	Birmingham City	A	2–1	16,464	Forbes (2)
15 November 1997	Middlesbrough	H	1–3	16,011	Roberts
22 November 1997	Oxford United	H	2–1	11,241	Fleck, Bellamy
29 November 1997	Bradford City	A	1–2	16,637	Bellamy
3 December 1997	Queens Park Rangers	A	1–1	10,141	Forbes
6 December 1997	Sheffield United	H	2–1	11,745	Vonk (own goal), Fuglestad
13 December 1997	Huddersfield Town	A	3–1	11,436	Forbes, Bellamy, Grant
20 December 1997	Stoke City	H	0–0	12,265	
26 December 1997	Charlton Athletic	A	1–2	14,472	Bellamy (pen)
30 December 1997	Portsmouth	H	2–0	16,441	Jackson, Bellamy
10 January 1998	Wolverhampton Wanderers	A	0–5	23,703	
17 January 1998	Nottingham Forest	H	1–0	17,059	Roberts
28 January 1998	Sunderland	H	2–1	15,940	Eadie, Craddock (own goal)
31 January 1998	Crewe Alexandra	A	0–1	5,559	
7 February 1998	Manchester City	H	0–0	15,274	
14 February 1998	Port Vale	A	2–2	6,664	Grant, Jackson
18 February 1998	Tranmere Rovers	H	0–2	12,105	
21 February 1998	Ipswich Town	A	0–5	21,858	
24 February 1998	Stockport County	A	2–2	7,471	Grant, Coote
28 February 1998	Queens Park Rangers	H	0–0	12,730	
4 March 1998	Birmingham City	H	3–3	9,819	Bellamy (2), Llewellyn
7 March 1998	Bury	A	0–1	5,154	
14 March 1998	West Bromwich Albion	H	1–1	24,663	Bellamy
22 March 1998	Middlesbrough	A	0–3	30,040	
28 March 1998	Oxford United	A	0–2	7,869	
4 April 1998	Bradford City	H	2–3	13,260	Llewellyn, Bellamy
11 April 1998	Sheffield United	A	2–2	16,915	Bellamy, Llewellyn
13 April 1998	Huddersfield Town	H	5–0	16,550	Fleming, Adams (pen), Roberts (2), Fuglestad
18 April 1998	Stoke City	A	0–2	13,098	
25 April 1998	Swindon Town	H	5–0	18,443	Llewellyn, Jackson, Roberts, Bellamy, Fenn
3 May 1998	Reading	A	1–0	14,817	Bellamy

=== FA Cup ===
Round	Date	Opponent	Venue	Result	Attendance	Goalscorers
R3	3 January 1998	Grimsby Town	A	0–3	8,161	

=== League Cup ===
Round	Date	Opponent	Venue	Result	Attendance	Goalscorers
R1 First Leg	12 August 1997	Barnet	H	2–1	5,429	Roberts, Adams
R1 Second Leg	26 August 1997	Barnet	A	1–3 (lost 3–4 on agg)	2,846	Roberts

== Players ==
=== First-team squad ===
Squad at end of season

Note: Flags indicate national team as defined under FIFA eligibility rules; some limited exceptions apply. Players may hold more than one non-FIFA nationality.

No.	Pos.	Nation	Player
—	GK	(England) ENG	Andy Marshall
—	GK	(Scotland) SCO	Bryan Gunn
—	GK	(England) ENG	Robert Green
—	DF	(England) ENG	Daryl Sutch
—	DF	(England) ENG	Matt Jackson
—	DF	(Spain) ESP	Víctor Segura
—	DF	(England) ENG	Craig Fleming
—	DF	(Norway) NOR	Erik Fuglestad
—	MF	(Scotland) SCO	Peter Grant
—	MF	(England) ENG	Neil Adams
—	MF	(England) ENG	Adrian Forbes
—	MF	(England) ENG	Darren Eadie
—	FW	(Wales) WAL	Craig Bellamy
—	FW	(Wales) WAL	Iwan Roberts
—	FW	(Scotland) SCO	Robert Fleck
—	MF	(Republic of Ireland) IRL	Mike Milligan (Note: Milligan was born in Manchester, England, but also qualified to represent the Republic of Ireland internationally and represented them at U-21, U-23, and B level before making his international debut for the Republic of Ireland in 1992.)
—	MF	(Wales) WAL	Chris Llewellyn
—	FW	(Northern Ireland) NIR	Adrian Coote (Note: Coote was born in Belton with Browston, England, but also qualified to represent Northern Ireland internationally and represented them at U-21 level before making his international debut for Northern Ireland in 1999.)

No.	Pos.	Nation	Player
—	DF	(England) ENG	Danny Mills
—	MF	(Republic of Ireland) IRL	Shaun Carey (Note: Carey was born in Kettering, England, but also qualified to represent the Republic of Ireland internationally and represented them at U-21 level.)
—	DF	(England) ENG	Rob Newman
—	DF	(England) ENG	John Polston
—	DF	(England) ENG	Darren Kenton
—	FW	(Republic of Ireland) IRL	Neale Fenn (Note: Fenn was born in Enfield, England, but also qualified to represent the Republic of Ireland internationally and represented them at U-21 and B level.) (on loan from Tottenham Hotspur)
—	MF	(Republic of Ireland) IRL	Keith O'Neill
—	MF	(England) ENG	Karl Simpson
—	MF	(England) ENG	Lee Marshall
—	DF	(England) ENG	Carl Bradshaw
—	DF	(England) ENG	Kevin Scott (on loan from Tottenham Hotspur)
—	FW	(England) ENG	Drewe Broughton
—	MF	(England) ENG	Darel Russell
—	MF	(England) ENG	Jamie Shore
—	DF	(England) ENG	Che Wilson
—	GK	(Wales) WAL	Mark Walton (on loan from Gillingham)
—	FW	(England) ENG	Damien Hilton
