= 1996–97 Norwich City F.C. season =

Norwich City
1996–97 season
- Manager: Mike Walker
- Stadium: Carrow Road
- First Division: 13th
- FA Cup: Fourth round
- League Cup: First round
- Top goalscorer: Eadie (17)
- Highest home attendance: 20,256 vs. Ipswich Town (11 October 1996)
- Lowest home attendance: 11,946 vs. Portsmouth (1 January 1997)
- Average home league attendance: 14,719

During the 1996–97 English football season, Norwich City F.C. competed in the Football League First Division.

== Season summary ==
In 1996, Mike Walker returned for a second spell as Norwich manager to the delight of the fans but during the season he could not achieve promotion during his first season back at the club with only a 13th-place finish. After a great start which saw the Canaries lose only 2 out of the first 14 games, Norwich's brilliant form deteriorated from the end of October, picking up 3 points from the next 10 matches with 7 defeats during the winless run which all but ended their chances of automatic promotion.

== Final league table ==
Pos	Team	Pld	W	D	L	GF	GA	GD	Pts
11	Tranmere Rovers	46	17	14	15	63	56	+7	65
12	Stoke City	46	18	10	18	51	57	−6	64
13	Norwich City	46	17	12	17	63	68	−5	63
14	Manchester City	46	17	10	19	59	60	−1	61
15	Charlton Athletic	46	16	11	19	52	66	−14	59

Rules for classification: 1) Points; 2) Goals scored; 3) Goal difference

== Results ==
Norwich City's score comes first

=== Legend ===
Win	Draw	Loss

=== Football League First Division ===
Date	Opponent	Venue	Result	Attendance	Scorers
17 August 1996	Swindon Town	H	2–0	15,165	Johnson, Fleck
24 August 1996	Bolton Wanderers	A	1–3	13,507	Eadie
27 August 1996	Oxford United	A	1–0	7,436	Adams
31 August 1996	Wolverhampton Wanderers	H	1–0	14,456	Adams (pen)
7 September 1996	Bradford City	A	2–0	10,054	Sutch, Eadie
11 September 1996	Queens Park Rangers	H	1–1	14,000	Adams
14 September 1996	Southend United	H	0–0	12,461	
21 September 1996	Portsmouth	A	1–0	7,511	Crook
28 September 1996	Tranmere Rovers	H	1–1	14,511	Fleck
1 October 1996	Grimsby Town	A	4–1	5,266	Eadie (2), Johnson, O'Neill
11 October 1996	Ipswich Town	H	3–1	20,256	Johnson (2), Polston
16 October 1996	Oldham Athletic	H	2–0	12,271	Eadie, Adams
19 October 1996	Manchester City	A	1–2	28,269	Scott
26 October 1996	Birmingham City	A	3–2	18,869	Johnson, Adams, Scott
30 October 1996	Sheffield United	H	1–1	14,534	Adams
2 November 1996	Charlton Athletic	H	1–2	14,145	Milligan
12 November 1996	Barnsley	A	1–3	9,697	Newman
16 November 1996	Reading	H	1–1	14,412	Scott
30 November 1996	Birmingham City	H	0–1	12,764	
7 December 1996	Huddersfield Town	A	0–2	10,749	
14 December 1996	Crystal Palace	H	1–1	16,395	Adams
18 December 1996	West Bromwich Albion	A	1–5	7,483	O'Neill
21 December 1996	Port Vale	A	1–6	6,278	Fleck
26 December 1996	Queens Park Rangers	A	2–3	15,699	Crook, Eadie
28 December 1996	Bradford City	H	2–0	13,473	Adams (pen), O'Neill
1 January 1997	Portsmouth	H	1–0	11,946	Jackson
18 January 1997	Grimsby Town	H	2–1	16,687	Polston, Sutch
22 January 1997	Stoke City	A	2–1	10,179	O'Neill, Eadie
28 January 1997	Tranmere Rovers	A	1–3	5,891	Eadie
1 February 1997	Barnsley	H	1–1	17,001	Eadie
9 February 1997	Sheffield United	A	3–2	15,301	Johnson, Ottosson, Holdsworth (own goal)
15 February 1997	West Bromwich Albion	H	2–4	14,845	Sutch, Adams (pen)
22 February 1997	Charlton Athletic	A	4–4	12,405	Adams (2), Eadie (2)
25 February 1997	Southend United	A	1–1	5,169	Fleck
1 March 1997	Huddersfield Town	H	2–0	13,001	Eadie (2)
4 March 1997	Reading	A	1–2	8,174	Adams
8 March 1997	Port Vale	H	1–1	16,101	Jackson
15 March 1997	Crystal Palace	A	0–2	17,378	
22 March 1997	Bolton Wanderers	H	0–1	17,585	
29 March 1997	Swindon Town	A	3–0	10,249	Eadie (2), O'Neill
31 March 1997	Oxford United	H	1–1	14,644	Eadie
5 April 1997	Wolverhampton Wanderers	A	2–3	26,938	Broughton, Adams
12 April 1997	Stoke City	H	2–0	13,805	O'Neill, Eadie
18 April 1997	Ipswich Town	A	0–2	22,397	
25 April 1997	Manchester City	H	0–0	14,080	
4 May 1997	Oldham Athletic	A	0–3	5,562	

=== FA Cup ===
Round	Date	Opponent	Venue	Result	Attendance	Goalscorers
R3	4 January 1997	Sheffield United	H	1–0	12,356	Polston
R4	25 January 1997	Leicester City	A	1–2	16,703	Adams (pen)

=== League Cup ===
Round	Date	Opponent	Venue	Result	Attendance	Goalscorers
R1 First Leg	20 August 1996	Oxford United	A	1–1	6,062	Johnson
R1 Second Leg	4 September 1996	Oxford United	H	2–3 (lost 3–4 on agg)	7,301	Adams (2, 1 pen)

== Players ==
=== First-team squad ===
Squad at end of season

Note: Flags indicate national team as defined under FIFA eligibility rules; some limited exceptions apply. Players may hold more than one non-FIFA nationality.

No.	Pos.	Nation	Player
—	GK	(England) ENG	Andy Marshall
—	GK	(Scotland) SCO	Bryan Gunn
—	DF	(England) ENG	Carl Bradshaw
—	DF	(England) ENG	Matt Jackson
—	DF	(England) ENG	Danny Mills
—	DF	(England) ENG	Neil Moore (on loan from Everton)
—	DF	(England) ENG	Rob Newman
—	DF	(England) ENG	John Polston
—	DF	(England) ENG	Kevin Scott (on loan from Tottenham Hotspur)
—	DF	(England) ENG	Daryl Sutch
—	DF	(Northern Ireland) NIR	Johnny Wright
—	MF	(England) ENG	Neil Adams
—	MF	(England) ENG	Ian Crook
—	MF	(England) ENG	Darren Eadie
—	MF	(England) ENG	Adrian Forbes

No.	Pos.	Nation	Player
—	MF	(England) ENG	Andy Johnson (Note: Johnson was born in Bristol, England, but also qualified to represent Wales internationally and made his international debut for Wales in 1998.)
—	MF	(England) ENG	Lee Marshall
—	MF	(England) ENG	David Rocastle (on loan from Chelsea)
—	MF	(England) ENG	Karl Simpson
—	MF	(Republic of Ireland) IRL	Shaun Carey (Note: Carey was born in Kettering, England, but also qualified to represent the Republic of Ireland internationally and represented them at U-21 level.)
—	MF	(Republic of Ireland) IRL	Mike Milligan (Note: Milligan was born in Manchester, England, but also qualified to represent the Republic of Ireland internationally and represented them at U-21, U-23, and B level before making his international debut for Republic of Ireland in 1992.)
—	MF	(Republic of Ireland) IRL	Keith O'Neill
—	MF	(Republic of Ireland) IRL	Matthew Rush (Note: Rush was born in Hackney, England, but also qualified to represent the Republic of Ireland internationally and represented them at U-21 level.)
—	FW	(England) ENG	Ade Akinbiyi (Note: Akinbiyi was born in Hackney, England, but also qualified to represent Nigeria internationally through his parents and would make his international debut for Nigeria in November 1999.)
—	FW	(England) ENG	Drewe Broughton
—	FW	(England) ENG	Jamie Cureton
—	FW	(England) ENG	Keith Scott
—	FW	(Scotland) SCO	Robert Fleck
—	FW	(Wales) WAL	Craig Bellamy
—	FW	(Sweden) SWE	Ulf Ottosson (on loan from IFK Norrköping)
