= 1995–96 Norwich City F.C. season =

Norwich City
1995–96 season
- Chairman: Robert Chase
- Manager: Martin O'Neill (until 17 December); Paul Franklin (caretaker from 17–20 December); Gary Megson (from 20 December)
- Stadium: Carrow Road
- First Division: 16th
- FA Cup: Third round
- League Cup: Quarter finals
- Top goalscorer: Ward (13)
- Average home league attendance: 14,581

During the 1995–96 English football season, Norwich City F.C. competed in the Football League First Division.

== Season summary ==
Martin O'Neill, who had taken Wycombe Wanderers from the Conference to the Second Division with successive promotions, was appointed as Norwich City manager in the summer of 1995. He lasted just six months in the job before resigning after a dispute with chairman Robert Chase over Chase's refusal to permit O'Neill to spend significant sums on strengthening the squad. Soon after O'Neill's resignation, Chase stepped down after protests from supporters, who complained that he kept selling the club's best players and was to blame for the relegation. Indeed, between 1992 and January 1995, Norwich sold a number of key attacking players: Robert Fleck (for £2.1M), Ruel Fox (for £2.25M), Chris Sutton (for £5M), Efan Ekoku (£0.9M) and Mark Robins (£1M). Nearly 40 years after being instrumental in saving the club from bankruptcy, Geoffrey Watling bought Chase's majority shareholding. Gary Megson was appointed Norwich manager on a temporary basis for the second time in eight months. Megson remained in charge until the end of the season before leaving the club. Just four seasons after finishing third in the Premiership and beating Bayern Munich in the UEFA Cup, Norwich had finished 16th in Division One.

== Final league table ==
Pos	Team	Pld	W	D	L	GF	GA	GD	Pts
14	Southend United	46	15	14	17	52	61	−9	59
15	Birmingham City	46	15	13	18	61	64	−3	58
16	Norwich City	46	14	15	17	59	55	+4	57
17	Grimsby Town	46	14	14	18	55	69	−14	56
18	Oldham Athletic	46	14	14	18	54	50	+4	56

Rules for classification: 1) Points; 2) Goals scored; 3) Goal difference

== Results ==
Norwich City's score comes first

=== Legend ===
Win	Draw	Loss

=== Football League First Division ===
Date	Opponent	Venue	Result	Attendance	Scorers
13 August 1995	Luton Town	A	3–1	7,848	Newsome (2), Adams
19 August 1995	Sunderland	H	0–0	16,739	
26 August 1995	Birmingham City	A	1–3	19,267	Sheron
30 August 1995	Oldham Athletic	H	2–1	14,816	Bowen, Johnson
2 September 1995	Port Vale	H	2–1	13,908	Johnson, Fleck
9 September 1995	Sheffield United	A	1–2	11,205	Ward
13 September 1995	Wolverhampton Wanderers	A	2–0	27,064	Johnson, Ward
16 September 1995	Millwall	H	0–0	15,962	
23 September 1995	Grimsby Town	A	2–2	5,901	Akinbiyi, Fleck
30 September 1995	Leicester City	H	0–1	18,435	
7 October 1995	Stoke City	A	1–1	12,016	Akinbiyi
14 October 1995	Barnsley	H	3–1	14,002	Newsome, Johnson, Fleck
21 October 1995	Charlton Athletic	A	1–1	13,369	Bowen
29 October 1995	Tranmere Rovers	H	1–1	15,513	Johnson
4 November 1995	Huddersfield Town	A	2–3	13,747	Ward (2)
11 November 1995	Crystal Palace	H	1–0	14,156	Johnson
19 November 1995	Ipswich Town	H	2–1	17,862	Newsome, Fleck
21 November 1995	West Bromwich Albion	A	4–1	13,680	Fleck, Scott, Ward, Adams
26 November 1995	Watford	A	2–0	7,798	Ward, Scott
2 December 1995	Stoke City	H	0–1	15,707	
9 December 1995	Grimsby Town	H	2–2	13,283	Ward, Eadie
17 December 1995	Leicester City	A	2–3	14,251	Fleck, Eadie
23 December 1995	Portsmouth	A	0–1	9,934	
26 December 1995	Southend United	H	0–1	17,029	
30 December 1995	Reading	H	3–3	13,556	Ward, Johnson, Fleck
1 January 1996	Derby County	A	1–2	16,714	Fleck
14 January 1996	Sunderland	A	1–0	14,983	Ward
20 January 1996	Luton Town	H	0–1	12,474	
4 February 1996	Birmingham City	H	1–1	12,612	Ward
10 February 1996	Oldham Athletic	A	0–2	17,001	
17 February 1996	Wolverhampton Wanderers	H	2–3	14,691	Eadie, Crook
24 February 1996	Millwall	A	1–2	8,218	Milligan
28 February 1996	Sheffield United	H	0–0	10,945	
2 March 1996	Southend United	A	1–1	6,208	Bradshaw
9 March 1996	Portsmouth	H	1–1	13,004	Milligan
16 March 1996	Reading	A	3–0	8,501	Sheppard (own goal), Eadie, O'Neill
20 March 1996	Port Vale	A	0–1	6,085	
23 March 1996	Derby County	H	1–0	15,349	Goss
30 March 1996	Charlton Athletic	H	0–1	13,434	
2 April 1996	Barnsley	A	2–2	6,375	Newman, Fleck
6 April 1996	Tranmere Rovers	A	1–1	6,618	Eadie
8 April 1996	Huddersfield Town	H	2–0	13,021	Fleck, Akinbiyi
14 April 1996	Ipswich Town	A	1–2	20,355	Cureton
20 April 1996	West Bromwich Albion	H	2–2	14,667	Cureton, Eadie
27 April 1996	Watford	H	1–2	14,188	Crook
5 May 1996	Crystal Palace	A	1–0	20,664	Hopkin (own goal)

=== FA Cup ===
Round	Date	Opponent	Venue	Result	Attendance	Goalscorers
R3	6 January 1996	Brentford	H	1–2	10,082	Newsome

=== League Cup ===
Round	Date	Opponent	Venue	Result	Attendance	Goalscorers
R2 1st Leg	20 September 1995	Torquay United	H	6–1	7,542	Akinbiyi (2), Crook, Sheron (2), Gore (own goal)
R2 2nd Leg	4 October 1995	Torquay United	A	3–2 (won 9–3 on agg)	1,790	Ullathorne, Mills, Eadie
R3	25 October 1995	Bradford City	H	0–0	11,649	
R3R	8 November 1995	Bradford City	A	5–3 (a.e.t.)	8,665	Ward (3), Johnson, Fleck
R4	29 November 1995	Bolton Wanderers	H	0–0	13,820	
R4R	20 December 1995	Bolton Wanderers	A	0–0 (won 3–2 on pens)	8,736	
QF	10 January 1996	Birmingham City	H	1–1	13,028	Fleck
QFR	24 January 1996	Birmingham City	A	1–2	21,097	Mølby

== Players ==
=== First-team squad ===
Squad at end of season

Note: Flags indicate national team as defined under FIFA eligibility rules; some limited exceptions apply. Players may hold more than one non-FIFA nationality.

No.	Pos.	Nation	Player
—	GK	SCO	Bryan Gunn
—	GK	ENG	Andy Marshall
—	DF	WAL	Mark Bowen
—	DF	ENG	Carl Bradshaw
—	DF	ENG	Danny Mills
—	DF	ENG	Rob Newman
—	DF	ENG	Jon Newsome
—	DF	ENG	John Polston
—	DF	ENG	Spencer Prior
—	DF	ENG	Daryl Sutch
—	DF	ENG	Robert Ullathorne
—	DF	NIR	Jon Wright
—	MF	ENG	Neil Adams
—	MF	IRL	Shaun Carey (Note: Carey was born in Kettering, England, but also qualified to represent the Republic of Ireland internationally and represented them at U-21 level.)
—	MF	ENG	Ian Crook
—	MF	ENG	Darren Eadie

No.	Pos.	Nation	Player
—	MF	ENG	Ali Gibb
—	MF	WAL	Jeremy Goss (Note: Goss was born in Oekolia, Cyprus, but also qualified to represent Wales internationally and made his international debut for Wales in May 1991.)
—	MF	ENG	Andy Johnson (Note: Johnson was born in Bristol, England, but also qualified to represent Wales internationally and made his international debut for Wales in 1998.)
—	MF	IRL	Mike Milligan (Note: Milligan was born in Manchester, England, but also qualified to represent the Republic of Ireland internationally and represented them at U-21, U-23, and B level before making his international debut for Republic of Ireland in 1992.)
—	MF	DEN	Jan Mølby (on loan from Liverpool)
—	MF	IRL	Keith O'Neill
—	MF	ENG	Matthew Rush (Note: Rush was born in Hackney, England, but also qualified to represent the Republic of Ireland internationally and represented them at U-21 level.)
—	MF	ENG	Jamie Shore
—	MF	ENG	Karl Simpson
—	FW	ENG	Ade Akinbiyi (Note: Akinbiyi was born in Hackney, England, but also qualified to represent Nigeria internationally through his parents and would make his international debut for Nigeria in November 1999.)
—	FW	ENG	Jamie Cureton
—	FW	SCO	Robert Fleck
—	FW	ENG	Keith Scott
—	FW	ENG	Mike Sheron
—	FW	ENG	Ashley Ward
