= 1998–99 Norwich City F.C. season =

Norwich City
1998–99 season
- Chairman: Bob Cooper
- Manager: Bruce Rioch
- Stadium: Carrow Road
- Football League First Division: 9th
- FA Cup: Third round
- Worthington Cup: Third round
- Top goalscorer: League: Roberts (19); All: Roberts (23)
- Average home league attendance: 15,761
Home colours

During the 1998–99 English football season, Norwich City F.C. competed in the Football League First Division.

== Season summary ==
Norwich made a good start to the 1998–1999 campaign, with a 1–0 victory against East Anglia rivals Ipswich Town at Portman Road being the highlight and by Christmas 1998, the prospects of promotion back to the Premiership were looking good – but the club didn't win a home game again until 1 May. During the season on 18 March 1999, ambiguous midfielder Keith O'Neill joined Middlesbrough for a fee of £700,000.

Off the field on 17 December 1998, there were slight changes in the boardroom where Bob Cooper replaced Barry Lockwood as club chairman.

== Final league table ==
Pos	Team	Pld	W	D	L	GF	GA	GD	Pts
7	Wolverhampton Wanderers	46	19	16	11	64	43	+21	73
8	Sheffield United	46	18	13	15	71	66	+5	67
9	Norwich City	46	15	17	14	62	61	+1	62
10	Huddersfield Town	46	15	16	15	62	71	−9	61
11	Grimsby Town	46	17	10	19	40	52	−12	61

Rules for classification: 1) Points; 2) Goals scored; 3) Goal difference

== Results ==
Norwich City's score comes first

=== Legend ===
Win	Draw	Loss

=== Football League First Division ===
Date	Opponent	Venue	Result	Attendance	Scorers
8 August 1998	Crewe Alexandra	H	2–1	15,016	Bellamy, Kenton
15 August 1998	Stockport County	A	2–0	6,538	Bellamy, Woodthorpe (own goal)
22 August 1998	Queens Park Rangers	H	4–2	16,317	Bellamy (3, 2 pens), Jackson
29 August 1998	West Bromwich Albion	A	0–2	17,401	
8 September 1998	[[Barnsley F.C.[Barnsley]]	A	3–1	15,695	Marshall, Roberts, Bellamy
13 September 1998	Bury	H	0–0	16,919	
19 September 1998	Sheffield United	A	1–2	16,155	Brannan
26 September 1998	Birmingham City	H	2–0	16,584	Bellamy, Roberts
29 September 1998	Sunderland	H	2–2	17,504	Eadie, Mackay
3 October 1998	Port Vale	A	0–1	5,580	
17 October 1998	Crystal Palace	A	1–5	18,100	Roberts
20 October 1998	Ipswich Town	A	1–0	22,079	Bellamy
24 October 1998	Huddersfield Town	H	4–1	15,403	Bellamy (2), Roberts (2)
3 November 1998	Watford	A	1–1	10,011	Eadie
7 November 1998	Bradford City	H	2–2	14,722	O'Brien, Adams
10 November 1998	Portsmouth	A	2–1	9,335	Roberts, Eadie
14 November 1998	Wolverhampton Wanderers	H	0–0	17,275	
21 November 1998	Tranmere Rovers	A	3–1	6,319	O'Neill, Bellamy, Roberts
29 November 1998	Oxford United	H	1–3	17,851	Bellamy
2 December 1998	Grimsby Town	H	3–1	12,024	Adams, Roberts, Bellamy
5 December 1998	Swindon Town	A	1–1	9,262	Roberts
12 December 1998	Wolverhampton Wanderers	A	2–2	21,014	Adams (pen), Roberts
19 December 1998	Bristol City	H	2–1	17,022	Roberts (2)
26 December 1998	Queens Park Rangers	A	0–2	15,251	
29 December 1998	Watford	H	1–1	19,255	Roberts
9 January 1999	Crewe Alexandra	A	2–3	4,782	Llewellyn, Marshall
16 January 1999	West Bromwich Albion	H	1–1	15,411	Marshall
30 January 1999	Bolton Wanderers	A	0–2	17,269	
6 February 1999	Stockport County	H	0–2	14,675	
16 February 1999	Barnsley	H	0–0	13,232	
20 February 1999	Bury	A	2–0	4,285	Bellamy, Fleming
27 February 1999	Sheffield United	H	1–1	14,224	Llewellyn
2 March 1999	Birmingham City	A	0–0	20,749	
6 March 1999	Sunderland	A	0–1	39,004	
9 March 1999	Port Vale	H	3–4	12,960	Fleming, Roberts, Bellamy
13 March 1999	Bradford City	A	1–4	13,331	Roberts
20 March 1999	Portsmouth	H	0–0	16,662	
24 March 1999	Huddersfield Town	A	1–1	9,717	Russell
3 April 1999	Crystal Palace	H	0–1	16,754	
5 April 1999	Grimsby Town	A	1–0	6,302	Mulryne
11 April 1999	Ipswich Town	H	0–0	19,511	
17 April 1999	Tranmere Rovers	H	2–2	14,735	Bellamy, Mulryne
20 April 1999	Bolton Wanderers	H	2–2	11,137	Roberts (2)
24 April 1999	Oxford United	A	4–2	7,345	Anselin, Roberts, Fleming, Bellamy
1 May 1999	Swindon Town	H	2–1	17,306	Roberts, Hughes
9 May 1999	Bristol City	A	0–1	11,362	

=== FA Cup ===
Round	Date	Opponent	Venue	Result	Attendance	Goalscorers
R3	3 January 1999	Sheffield Wednesday	A	1–4	18,737	Roberts

=== League Cup ===
Round	Date	Opponent	Venue	Result	Attendance	Goalscorers
R1 1st Leg	11 August 1998	Swansea City	A	1–1	3,803	Bellamy
R1 2nd Leg	18 August 1998	Swansea City	H	1–0 (won 2–1 on agg)	13,146	Roberts
R2 1st Leg	16 September 1998	Wigan Athletic	H	1–0	11,426	Bradshaw (own goal)
R2 2nd Leg	22 September 1998	Wigan Athletic	A	3–2 (won 4–2 on agg)	3,402	Bellamy, Roberts (2)
R3	27 October 1998	Bolton Wanderers	A	1–1 (lost 1–3 on pens)	14,189	O'Neill

== Players ==
=== First-team squad ===
Squad at end of season

Note: Flags indicate national team as defined under FIFA eligibility rules; some limited exceptions apply. Players may hold more than one non-FIFA nationality.

No.	Pos.	Nation	Player
-	GK	(England) ENG	Andy Marshall
-	DF	(England) ENG	Daryl Sutch
-	DF	(England) ENG	Craig Fleming
-	DF	(England) ENG	Matt Jackson (captain)
-	DF	(Norway) NOR	Erik Fuglestad
-	MF	(England) ENG	Lee Marshall
-	MF	(Wales) WAL	Chris Llewellyn
-	FW	(Wales) WAL	Iwan Roberts
-	FW	(Wales) WAL	Craig Bellamy
-	MF	(Scotland) SCO	Peter Grant
-	MF	(England) ENG	Darren Eadie
-	DF	(Scotland) SCO	Malky Mackay
-	DF	(England) ENG	Darren Kenton
-	GK	(Scotland) SCO	Michael Watt
-	MF	(England) ENG	Neil Adams
-	MF	(Republic of Ireland) IRL	Keith O'Neill

No.	Pos.	Nation	Player
-	DF	(England) ENG	Che Wilson
-	MF	(England) ENG	Ged Brannan
-	MF	(England) ENG	Darel Russell
-	MF	(England) ENG	Adrian Forbes
-	MF	(Republic of Ireland) IRL	Shaun Carey (Note: Carey was born in Kettering, England, but also qualified to represent the Republic of Ireland internationally and represented them at U-21 level.)
-	MF	(France) FRA	Cédric Anselin (on loan from Bordeaux)
-	GK	(England) ENG	Robert Green
-	MF	(Northern Ireland) NIR	Philip Mulryne
-	FW	(Scotland) SCO	Paul Dalglish (on loan from Newcastle United)
-	FW	(Northern Ireland) NIR	Adrian Coote (Note: Coote was born in Belton with Browston, England, but also qualified to represent Northern Ireland internationally and represented them at U-21 level before making his international debut for Northern Ireland in 1999.)
-	DF	(Spain) ESP	Víctor Segura
-	MF	(England) ENG	Paul Hughes (on loan from Chelsea)
-	MF	(Republic of Ireland) IRL	Mike Milligan (Note: Milligan was born in Manchester, England, but also qualified to represent the Republic of Ireland internationally and represented them at U-21, U-23, and B level before making his international debut for the Republic of Ireland in 1992.)
-	DF	(England) ENG	Kevin Scott
-	MF	(England) ENG	Darren Way
