= Iwan Roberts =

Welsh footballer (born 1968)

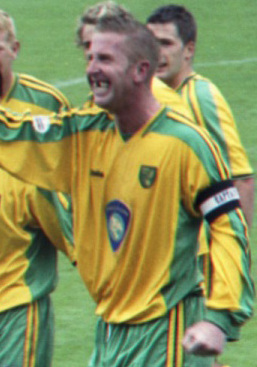
- Roberts celebrating after scoring a goal for Norwich City in 2004

Personal information
- Full name: Iwan Wyn Roberts
- Date of birth: 26 June 1968 (age 58)
- Place of birth: Bangor, Wales
- Height: 6 ft 4 in (1.93 m)
- Position: Forward

Youth career
- –1986: Watford

Senior career*
Years	Team	Apps	(Gls)
1986–1990	Watford	63	(9)
1990–1993	Huddersfield Town	142	(50)
1993–1996	Leicester City	100	(41)
1996–1997	Wolverhampton Wanderers	33	(12)
1997–2004	Norwich City	278	(84)
2004–2005	Gillingham	20	(3)
2005	→ Cambridge United (loan)	11	(3)
Total		647	(202)

International career
1989–2001	Wales	15	(0)
1994	Wales B	1	(1)

Managerial career
- 2004: Gillingham (joint-caretaker)
- * Club domestic league appearances and goals

Iwan Wyn Roberts (born 26 June 1968) is a Welsh former professional footballer who played as a forward from 1986 to 2005 for a number of clubs and the Wales national team. His footballing career started at Watford as a trainee before signing his first professional contract with the club in 1986. He moved to Huddersfield Town in 1990 where he remained for three seasons before transferring to Leicester City. Roberts signed for Wolverhampton Wanderers after three further seasons, but stayed for a single campaign before transferring to Norwich City, where he spent seven years. He played international football for Wales and amassed fifteen caps between 1989 and 2001, without scoring.

Roberts made 647 league appearances during his career, almost half of which were for Norwich, where he overcame a weak start to become a fan favourite. At his peak, he scored 61 goals in three seasons, and finished with two goals in his final game as Norwich achieved promotion to the Premiership. He was elected to the Norwich City F.C. Hall of Fame in 2002, while still at the club. His professional career ended with spells at Gillingham and on loan to Cambridge United.

Since retiring as a player, Roberts, who speaks fluent Welsh, has worked as a commentator for Sky Sports, BBC Radio Cymru and BBC Cymru Wales. His book, All I Want for Christmas ..., a reference to his gap-toothed appearance, prompted both controversy and praise when it was published in 2004.

== Early life ==
Iwan Wyn Roberts was born in Bangor, Gwynedd, on 26 June 1968. He grew up in Barmouth, on the west coast of Wales, as a Liverpool fan.

Roberts says that most football fans would know him ("if you know me at all") as "that gap-toothed ginger lunk". He started losing his front tooth when he was just 10: his best friend's heel chipping half of his tooth off, the result of an incident playing football. Some years later, a dentist removed the stump when an abscess developed. He lost his second front tooth as the result of an elbow to the mouth from Darran Rowbotham when he was 18, playing for Watford in a pre-season friendly.

Roberts credits his school PE teacher, Iolo Owen, as a great influence in his career, introducing him into men's football aged 15: "He picked me for the school team and got me into the local men's team, Harlech Town ... as he was the manager ... it toughened me up and made me a lot stronger." Critical to Roberts' thinking when he joined Watford was that coach Tom Walley was, like himself, Welsh-speaking, as was professional Malcolm Allen, against whom Roberts had played in the local Welsh leagues. He was also influenced by Graham Taylor's record of giving youth players opportunities. Roberts joined Watford as a trainee, signing his first professional contract in July 1986, shortly after his 18th birthday.

== Club career ==
=== Watford ===
Roberts made his first-team debut during the 1985–86 season and scored his first goal in professional football on 16 September 1986; it was the only goal in a 1–0 win against Manchester United at Vicarage Road. Having made only one full first team appearance for Watford prior to the match, Roberts came on as a second-half substitute to score the winning goal from a narrow angle. Watford ended the season in ninth position, and despite having three years of his contract remaining, Taylor left the club to join Aston Villa. Roberts broke through in the following season, making 31 appearances in all competitions and scoring three goals, but Watford finished 19th in the table and were relegated to the Second Division. The 1988–89 season saw him make 32 appearances in total, scoring six goals, with Watford finishing fourth, but failing to progress past the 1989 Football League play-offs. Roberts' chances were restricted the following season, when he made just nine league appearances, scoring twice.

He scored nine goals in 63 league matches in total for Watford, but felt that he was failing to get enough opportunities and moved to Division Three club Huddersfield Town prior to the start of the 1990–91 season, for £275,000. One of his contemporaries at Watford was future Norwich City manager, Glenn Roeder. Roberts remembers Roeder as "an absolute gentleman ... I can't speak highly enough of him. He helped me a great deal with his experience and any problems that the young lads had they knew he would help them with."

=== Huddersfield Town ===
Roberts credits a lot of his success as a striker to the interaction he had with Huddersfield's then first-team coach, Peter Withe: "Peter was exceptional in the air and he taught me so much on how to use my physicality properly and how to move defenders about especially in the penalty box which would enable me a bit more time and space in the box." The club then signed Frank Stapleton, who helped the young Roberts develop "awareness in the opposition's penalty box" and how to "steal goals" to increase his goal tally, getting a final touch to 'help' a goalbound ball cross the line.

The 1991–92 season brought Roberts a club post-war record 34 goals in a season, 24 of which were in the league, making him joint top-scorer in the division. His efforts helped the club to finish third and qualify for the play-offs. There they lost to Peterborough United where Roberts failed to score in either leg. Overall, whilst playing for Huddersfield he scored 50 goals in 142 games. In November 1993 he was signed by the Second Division club Leicester City for £300,000. Neil Warnock, Huddersfield's manager, needed to sell players and Leicester manager Brian Little took an interest.

=== Leicester City ===
Roberts made his debut for Leicester in a Midlands derby against Wolverhampton Wanderers. At half time, Leicester were two goals behind and he expected manager Brian Little, "the nicest man" he ever played for to rant in the dressing room, but instead he quietly told the players he was going to make two substitutions. In the second half, Roberts scored two goals to secure a draw. After retiring, Roberts said he still regretted not completing a hat-trick in the match, a feat he did achieve in April 1994, in a 28-minute spell against local rivals Derby County. As recently as 2017, this achievement is still recalled in a chant by Leicester City fans. Roberts broke some ribs a few weeks later and returned to the first-team squad just in time for the 1993–94 play-off final, which Leicester won 2–1 against Derby.

In the 1994–95 Premiership, Leicester struggled and were relegated, but Roberts was the club's top scorer with 11 goals in all competitions. He scored another 19 goals the following season, as Leicester reached the play-offs again. In the semi-final, Leicester drew 0–0 with Stoke City in the first leg at home and won 1-0 in the second leg from a Garry Parker goal, to qualify for the final. What followed was one of the only two incidents that "bugged" Roberts during his playing career: while celebrating the win, he suddenly realised he was in danger due to a pitch invasion by Stoke supporters. He managed to escape, but some of his team-mates, including Neil Lennon and Muzzy Izzet were less fortunate, and had to be protected by police. Although it was reported that Roberts had recovered from injury, he was not selected for the squad for the play-off final against Crystal Palace. Leicester won the match which secured them promotion to the Premiership. With the side promoted again, Leicester decided to sell Roberts to Wolves. In all, Roberts scored 41 goals in 100 league games for Leicester.

=== Wolverhampton Wanderers ===
His goals and performances for Leicester persuaded Wolves to sign Roberts for £1.3m in the summer of 1996. He spent only one season at Molineux in which he scored 12 goals in 33 games, including one hat-trick for the club in a match against their local rivals West Bromwich Albion in the Black Country derby. Wolves ended the season in third place but lost 4–3 on aggregate to Crystal Palace in the play-offs, with Roberts failing to score in either leg.

In the summer off-season of 1997, Roberts returned from holiday and came into the club for the first day of pre-season training where manager Mark McGhee called him into his office. There McGhee said that he had been told that in order to bring in new players, he had to sell first, and that Roberts was the only player for whom an offer had been made – by Norwich City. Roberts did not want to leave the club, but accepted that if the manager did not want him there, he needed to go.

=== Norwich City ===
In July 1997, Norwich City manager Mike Walker paid £850,000 to Wolves to secure the services of Roberts. His time at the club (nicknamed the Canaries) did not begin happily, however. Following his debut in August 1997 against his former club Wolves, he struggled throughout the 1997–98 season and scored just seven goals; "there were certainly those in the stands who were questioning whether he was worth the near £1,000,000 splashed out on him". There were crowd chants about him being a "waste of money" and Roberts remembers that someone wrote to the Eastern Daily Press and described him as "the worst ever to wear a Norwich shirt", adding the reflection that "it was the bleakest period of all my years as a pro." Roberts had scored just four goals heading into the end of the season; however, his fitness slowly began to improve and "three goals in the final two home games of the season left in good heart for the next campaign". Walker was sacked at the end of the season, and Roberts blames himself for this happening – a result of his lack of goals.

Walker was replaced during the summer by Bruce Rioch. During pre-season training, Roberts weighed in at 15 stone 3 pounds (97 kg), with a body fat ratio of 16–17%, when his "fighting weight" should have been "just under 14 stone with around 13 per cent body fat." The turnaround was, according to Roberts, due to some clever psychology by Rioch:

"Bruce was very clever: he didn't issue me with an ultimatum, he didn't rant and rave or threaten me. He just said, "Tom Walley would be proud of you". Tom was my youth team manager at Watford and absolutely hated people being out of shape ... It was a gentle hint, but I realised ... I had to sort it out myself."

Roberts threw himself into weight training and soon reached a target weight of 13 stone 10 pounds. It paid off: that season, Roberts scored 23 goals. He was partnered by what the Eastern Daily Press described as the "flourishing talent" of Craig Bellamy who scored 19 goals. Norwich finished in the top half of the table and the Canaries fans voted Roberts player of the season. In the 1999–2000 season he was again top scorer (19 goals in 49 games) and retained the player of the season award. He just missed out on becoming the first player in the club's history to win the award three years in a row when Andy Marshall finished narrowly ahead of him in the voting for the 2000–01 season.

During that 1999–2000 campaign there was speculation about Roberts's future as his contract was due to expire in the summer of 2000. Roberts had an agent, former team-mate and close friend David Speedie, who advised him to turn down Norwich's offer and sign for Nottingham Forest or Huddersfield Town. Ultimately, "he couldn't produce anything on paper that told me I'd be signing ... so I could have got injured in training, never played again and not got a penny." As a result, the two men fell out and Roberts did not use the services of an agent again, representing himself in contract negotiations. Shortly after he signed a contract extension in January of that season, Bruce Rioch left the club and was succeeded by Bryan Hamilton. Roberts helped Hamilton make a good start when he scored both goals in a 2–0 win at Portman Road against City's East Anglian derby rivals Ipswich Town on 19 March 2000.

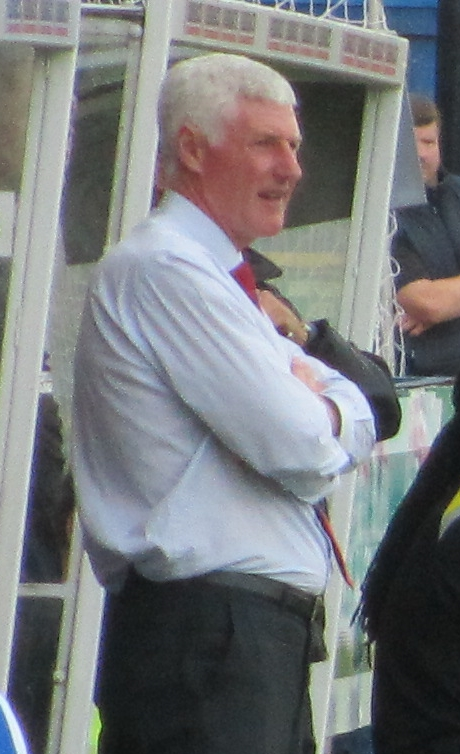
Under Nigel Worthington, Roberts became club captain, but also finished his Norwich City career.

Although Roberts was personally enjoying the most productive spell of his career, his first four years at Carrow Road had seen the club struggle. They had barely threatened to qualify for the end of season play-offs, ending the 2000–01 campaign in 15th place, six points above the relegation zone. The 2001–02 season, with new manager Nigel Worthington in his first full season in charge, saw the team fare better and they reached the Division One play-off final at the Millennium Stadium in Cardiff. Roberts missed much of the second half of the season because of injury, but came off the substitute's bench in the final to give Norwich the lead in the first minute of extra-time with a header. Norwich lost the match in a penalty shoot-out after Birmingham City had equalised. Roberts took – and scored – the first penalty of the shoot-out but misses by Phil Mulryne and Daryl Sutch meant Birmingham won 4–2 and were promoted to the Premiership.

During the 2002–03 season, Roberts captained the Norwich team. That season, in a match against Sheffield Wednesday at Carrow Road, Roberts scored twice to move into third place on the list of Norwich City's all-time leading goalscorers, overtaking Robert Fleck in the process. The Canaries faded after a good start to the season, finishing in eighth place and failing to qualify for the play-offs. Roberts scored just 7 goals in 47 games. The 2003–04 season would be his last at Carrow Road and although he was no longer a regular starter for the first team he played an important part in one of the club's best-ever seasons. The team won the title and were promoted to the Premiership. Roberts scored some important goals, including the winning strike in a top-of-the-table match against Sheffield United. Roberts revealed in his autobiography that in February of that season he had a cancer scare and had to have a melanoma removed from his arm.

A few days before the club's last home match of the 2003–04 season, Worthington announced that Roberts would not be offered a new contract when his deal expired that summer. Worthington felt that, following promotion to the Premiership, the club had to look to the future and that Roberts was now surplus to requirements. Although he had made 41 league appearances that season, he started just 13 games. With the championship already won, Worthington restored Roberts to the starting line-up for the last game of the season at Gresty Road against Crewe Alexandra and made him captain for the day. Roberts scored twice as City won 3–1; he described the occasion and the goal: "I'd never scored on the final day of a season before, it was my final game in a Norwich shirt, which was a very sad occasion, Nigel Worthington made me captain for the day and I'll be forever thankful for that, and I managed to cap it all off by getting two goals. One of them was a left footed volley into the top corner and I haven't got too many of those in my career!" Overall, Roberts scored 96 goals in 306 games for Norwich.

=== Gillingham and Cambridge United ===
After being released by Norwich, he received a number of offers to play for other clubs, including from Swiss side FC Basel, but eventually signed a two-year contract with Gillingham of the Championship, where he would be player/coach. His debut was against Ipswich, Norwich's local rivals, and was booked after less than five seconds. The move to Gillingham did not prove a good one for him and he had a number of disagreements with the club, particularly with Stan Ternent after he succeeded Andy Hessenthaler as manager. In December 2004 Roberts had himself served as joint caretaker manager, along with Darren Hare and Paul Smith, after the sudden departure of both Hessenthaler and initial caretaker John Gorman. In March 2005 he joined Cambridge United on loan until the end of the season to play under the management of former Norwich team-mate, Rob Newman. He scored his 200th league goal on his debut, but Cambridge were relegated from League Two. In August 2005, Roberts retired from playing after reaching an agreement with Gillingham to pay the final year of his contract.

== International career ==
While a Watford player, Roberts was called up for Wales for the first time, an April 1989 friendly game against Israel. He made his debut for the Welsh national team on 11 October 1989, when he took to the field in a 2–1 defeat to the Netherlands in a World Cup qualifier at the Racecourse Ground, Wrexham. With both Ian Rush and Mark Hughes suspended, Roberts started the game alongside Malcolm Allen. He had to wait more than two years for his next international appearance, when his domestic form for Huddersfield saw him leading scorer in Division Two. Roberts played in a 1–1 friendly against Austria in April 1992. He earned two more caps that year at the Kirin Cup in Japan, suffering a 1–0 loss against Argentina and receiving a red card in a 1–0 victory over the host nation for a foul on Masami Ihara. Roberts made three appearances for the senior Wales team in 1994, including two qualification matches for UEFA Euro 1996 against Albania and Moldova. He was not selected for Wales again until 2000 when he made three appearances in friendlies, all losses against Finland, Brazil and Portugal.

Roberts made four more appearances for his country in the qualification stages for the 2002 FIFA World Cup in 2000 and 2001. He won a total of 15 caps for his country over a 12-year period, including a single appearance and one goal for the Wales B team, but failed to score for the senior team. Roberts is phlegmatic that he made only 17 appearances ("most as substitute") for Wales, as he "had to compete against the likes of Mark Hughes, Ian Rush, Dean Saunders, so there were some world-class strikers before me and I was just happy to get in the squad." He regards the fact that he did not score for Wales as the greatest regret of his career.

== Style of play ==
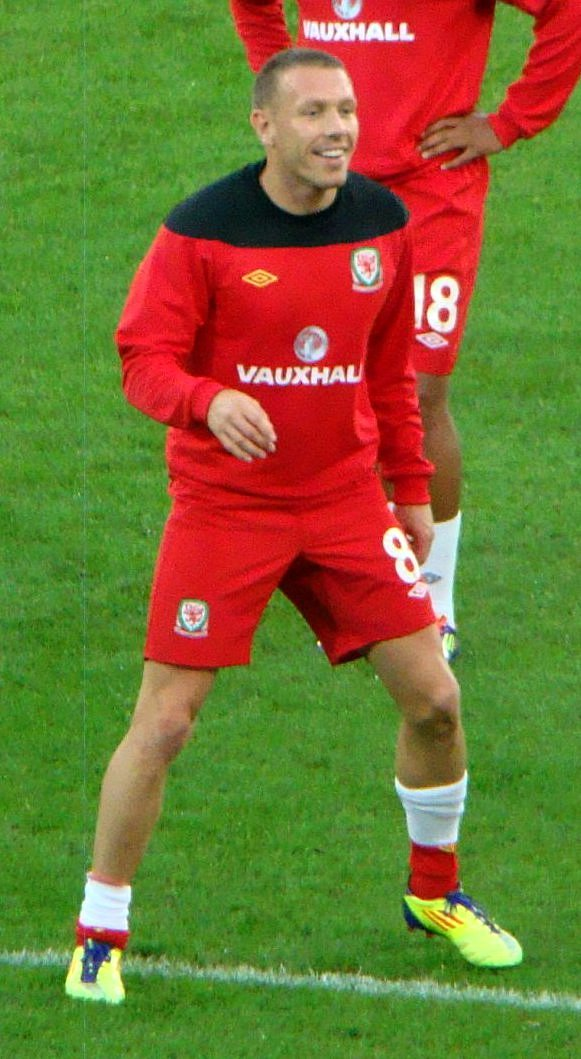
Bellamy playing for Wales in 2011

Standing at 6 ft 3 in (1.91 m), Roberts was known for scoring a high proportion of his goals with headers. He had a strong partnership with Craig Bellamy, beginning when Bellamy broke into the Norwich first team in 1997, aged 18. They also featured together for Wales, although Roberts never managed to score in 15 appearances for the national side. Roberts said "I absolutely loved playing up-front with [Bellamy] ... we hit it off straight away, probably more so than anyone else I ever played with. It was like telepathy between us." He described the relationship as "the classic big man, little man" and noted that in their first season together for Norwich, Roberts scored 24 goals and Bellamy 17.

== All I Want for Christmas ... ==
In 2004, Roberts published an account of his last season at Norwich, entitled All I want for Christmas .... The title of the book was a joke based on Roberts' missing front teeth, a reference to the song "All I Want for Christmas Is My Two Front Teeth". The book proved controversial, because it included an admission of a deliberate stamp on Wolves defender Kevin Muscat, an incident that had taken place in 2000:

"As I got up I 'lost my balance' and trod on his back. Fourteen stone through eight studs, you do the maths. He was in agony, but the ref didn't see it so I got away with it. Of course, I pulled him up and said 'Sorry mate, sorry mate', but he knew."

Roberts stated in the book that the stamp was a payback for a serious injury that Muscat had inflicted on Craig Bellamy while Bellamy and Roberts were playing together for Norwich, and that Muscat held no grudges over it.

Because of the coverage in the book, the Football Association retrospectively investigated the incident and Roberts, then playing at Gillingham, was banned for three matches and fined £2,500 for the offence. Roberts commented that this "left 'a bitter taste' – especially after England captain David Beckham escaped without a punishment for his deliberate foul in the World Cup qualifier against Wales." The Football Association said there was "insufficient evidence" to charge Beckham with bringing the game into disrepute. This was "despite his admission in The Daily Telegraph and subsequent apology." At the time, Roberts told The Daily Telegraph, "I do not want players to get suspensions and fines, but there must be consistency, regardless of who the player is." The book was praised by critics. The Daily Telegraph called it "a rollicking good read. If it doesn't make you at least smile, then it's time to seek counselling."

== Post-playing career ==
Roberts has the UEFA A Licence for football coaching and, speaking in 2007, had not ruled out getting into management. He told the Eastern Daily Press, "I've done my qualifications. It's just getting a club to give me a chance and taking it." When Norwich sacked Nigel Worthington, Roberts applied for the manager's job. "I tried to go for it ... knowing I wasn't going to get it but I'd never really been for an interview and I thought if I did it would stand me in good stead. But I never got a response from the club and that really disappointed me. A week after Peter Grant got the job I got a letter through the post saying 'We won't be considering you this time'. And I thought 'I've known that for the past seven days'."

=== Media work ===
Roberts works in the media. He is bilingual, speaking fluent Welsh, and provides Welsh-language commentary for Sky Sports and BBC Radio Cymru. He also works for BBC Cymru Wales. He writes regularly for the local press in Norfolk, commenting on Norwich City and also contributes to the weekly podcast Elis James Feast of Football with comedian Elis James and fellow Welsh former international player Danny Gabbidon.

== Personal life ==
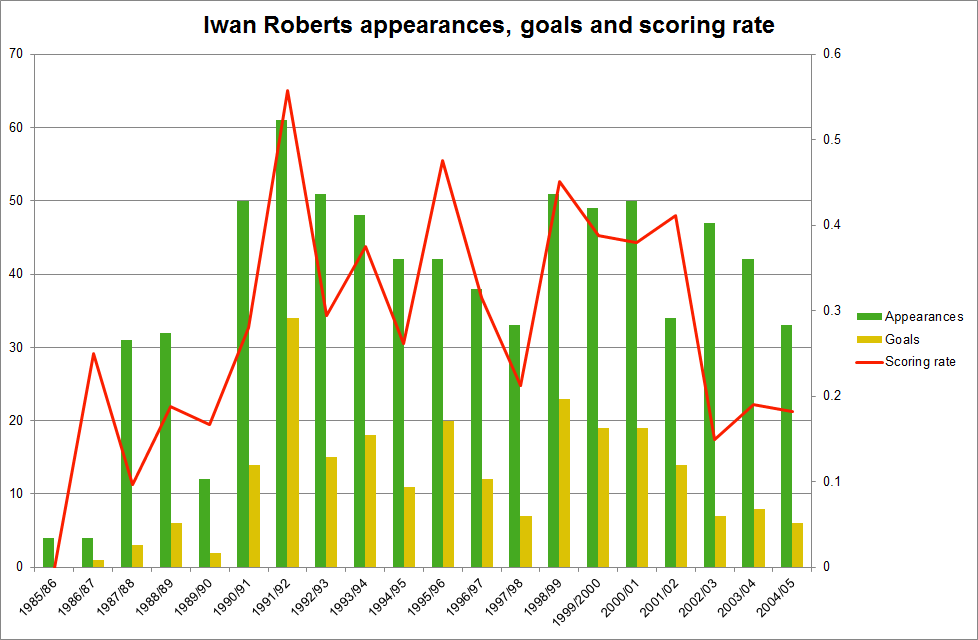
Iwan Roberts appearances, goals and scoring rate

Roberts was married in 2016, and has three children; a son and twin daughters.

In January 2020, it was reported that Roberts had volunteered for dementia research. It followed research, published by the University of Glasgow in 2019. He has "taken a series of simple memory, attention and spatial-awareness tests and he will repeat them every six months", and will ask former Norwich City colleagues to do the same. As early as in his 2004 autobiography, Roberts had attributed signs of memory loss to heading a football: "I haven't got the best memory ... and I think that comes from heading a football so often, especially in the early days when balls were that bit heavier ... it must have taken its toll."

== Legacy ==
In 2002, Roberts was made an inaugural member of the Norwich City F.C. Hall of Fame. In 2007, Roberts came third in a vote run by the Norwich Evening News to determine which Norwich legend would be inaugurated into the Professional Footballers' Association Centenary Hall of Fame.

== Career statistics ==
=== Club ===
Appearances and goals by club, season and competition
Club	Season	League			FA Cup		League Cup		Other		Total	
Club	Season	Division	Apps	Goals	Apps	Goals	Apps	Goals	Apps	Goals	Apps	Goals
Watford	1985–86	First Division	4	0	0	0	0	0	—		4	0
Watford	1986–87	First Division	3	1	0	0	1	0	0	0	4	1
Watford	1987–88	First Division	25	2	1	0	4	1	1 (Note: Appearance(s) in Full Members Cup)	0	31	3
Watford	1988–89	Second Division	22	6	5	0	1	0	4 (Note: Two appearances in Full Members Cup, two in Second Division play-offs)	0	32	6
Watford	1989–90	Second Division	9	0	1	0	2	2	0	0	12	2
Watford	Total		63	9	7	0	8	3	5	0	83	12
Huddersfield Town	1990–91	Third Division	44	13	2	1	2	0	2 (Note: Appearances in Associate Members Cup)	0	50	14
Huddersfield Town	1991–92	Third Division	46	24	3	3	5	3	7 (Note: Five appearances and four goals in Associate Members Cup, two in Third Division play-offs)	4	61	34
Huddersfield Town	1992–93	Second Division	37	9	5	0	4	2	5	4	51	15
Huddersfield Town	1993–94	Second Division	15	4	2	0	3	1	1	0	21	5
Huddersfield Town	Total		142	50	12	4	14	6	15	8	183	68
Leicester City	1993–94	First Division	26	13	—		—		1 (Note: Appearance(s) in First Division play-offs)	0	27	13
Leicester City	1994–95	Premiership	37	9	3	2	2	0	—		42	11
Leicester City	1995–96	First Division	37	19	2	0	3	1	0	0	42	20
Leicester City	Total		100	41	5	2	5	1	1	0	111	44
Wolverhampton Wanderers	1996–97	First Division	33	12	1	0	2	0	2	0	38	12
Norwich City	1997–98	First Division	31	5	0	0	2	2	—		33	7
Norwich City	1998–99	First Division	45	19	1	1	5	3	—		51	23
Norwich City	1999–2000	First Division	44	17	1	0	4	2	—		49	19
Norwich City	2000–01	First Division	44	15	1	1	5	3	—		50	19
Norwich City	2001–02	First Division	30	13	0	0	1	0	3	1	34	14
Norwich City	2002–03	First Division	43	7	3	0	1	0	—		47	7
Norwich City	2003–04	First Division	41	8	1	0	0	0	—		42	8
Norwich City	Total		278	84	7	2	18	10	3	1	306	97
Gillingham	2004–05	Championship	20	3	1	0	1	0	—		22	3
Cambridge United (loan)	2004–05	League Two	11	3	—		—		—		11	3
Career total			647	202	33	8	48	20	26	9	754	239

=== International ===
Appearances and goals by national team and year
National team	Year	Apps	Goals
Wales	1989	1	0
Wales	1992	3	0
Wales	1994	3	0
Wales	2000	5	0
Wales	2001	2	0
Total		14	0

== Honours ==
Leicester City

- Football League First Division play-offs: 1994

Norwich City

- Football League First Division: 2003–04

Individual

- PFA Team of the Year: 1991–92 Third Division
