= Kevin Scott (footballer) =

English footballer (born 1966)

Personal information
- Full name: Kevin Watson Scott
- Date of birth: 17 December 1966 (age 59)
- Place of birth: Easington, County Durham, England
- Height: 6 ft 2 in (1.88 m)
- Position: Defender

Youth career
- Middlesbrough
- 198?–198?: Durham City
- 198?–1984: Newcastle United

Senior career*
Years	Team	Apps	(Gls)
1984–1994	Newcastle United	227	(8)
1994–1997	Tottenham Hotspur	18	(1)
1995	→ Port Vale (loan)	17	(1)
1996–1997	→ Charlton Athletic (loan)	4	(0)
1997	→ Norwich City (loan)	5	(0)
1997–1999	Norwich City	28	(0)
1999	→ Darlington (loan)	4	(0)
1999–2001	Guisborough Town	?	(?)
2001–200?	Crook Town	?	(?)
Total		303	(10)
- * Club domestic league appearances and goals

Kevin Watson Scott (born 17 December 1966) is an English former football defender. He played over 300 games for six clubs in the Football League.

Starting his career with Newcastle United in 1984, he spent ten years with the club, playing as captain as the club won the First Division title in 1992–93. A move to Tottenham Hotspur followed in February 1994. However, he did not settle at the club and instead spent the majority of his three years at the club on loan at Port Vale, Charlton Athletic and Norwich City. He moved to Norwich permanently in 1997, spending two years at the club before leaving the professional game in 1999, shortly after a loan spell with Darlington.

== Career ==
A former youth player at Middlesbrough, Scott spent just one season with the club before being released. He worked at a paper mill and a lumber factory whilst playing part-time for Durham City. Spotted by Newcastle United manager Jack Charlton, he was part of a youth side that won the FA Youth Cup in 1985, playing alongside the likes of Joe Allon, Gary Kelly, Brian Tinnion and Paul Gascoigne.

He helped Willie McFaul's "Magpies" to a 17th-place finish in the First Division in 1986–87. He scored twice in six appearances in the 1987–88 campaign, before making 36 starts in the 1988–89 relegation season. He then featured 53 times in the 1989–90 season, as new boss Jim Smith led the club to a third-place finish in the Second Division. He started 42 of the club's 46 games in the 1990–91 campaign and played 50 matches as captain under Osvaldo Ardiles in the 1991–92 season. New manager Kevin Keegan handed the captaincy to Brian Kilcline. United went on to win promotion as the division's champions in 1992–93; Scott scored two goals in 56 league and cup appearances. He played 18 top-flight games in the first half of the 1993–94 season, before leaving St James' Park on a £850,000 sale to Tottenham Hotspur in February 1994.

Former Newcastle boss Osvaldo Ardiles was in charge at White Hart Lane and led Spurs to a 15th-place finish in the Premier League in 1993–94. Gerry Francis replaced Ardiles as manager early in the 1994–95 season, and Scott lost his first-team place. He signed on loan for John Rudge's Port Vale in January 1995. He helped to shore up Port Vale's defence, as an upturn in form in the second half of the 1994–95 season saw Port Vale rise out of the First Division relegation zone. Rudge wanted to buy Scott, but Vale could not match Tottenham's valuation of £600,000. Tottenham went on to finish tenth in the 1995–96 season, though Scott rarely featured in the first-team. Still a peripheral player in the 1996–97 season, he was loaned out to Alan Curbishley's First Division Charlton Athletic, though played just four games at The Valley.

Scott joined Norwich City in February 1997 for a £250,000 fee. Mike Walker's "Canaries" finished 13th in the First Division in 1996–97, and then 15th in 1997–98. Under the stewardship of Bruce Rioch, Norwich finished ninth in 1998–99. However, Scott only played 33 first-team games at Carrow Road, of which just one match was under Rioch. He played his last professional game at Feethams on a loan spell with David Hodgson's Third Division club Darlington in February 1999, where an ongoing knee injury ended his professional career. After leaving Norwich later that year, he played numerous games for Northern League sides Guisborough Town and Crook Town.

== Post-retirement ==
In 2008, Scott was working as a coach at the Middlesbrough F.C. Academy. As of December 2011, he was working as a driving instructor with Loxley driver training.

== Career statistics ==
Appearances and goals by club, season and competition
Club	Season	League			FA Cup		Other		Total	
Club	Season	Division	Apps	Goals	Apps	Goals	Apps	Goals	Apps	Goals
Newcastle United	1986–87	First Division	3	1	0	0	2	0	5	1
Newcastle United	1987–88	First Division	4	1	0	0	2	1	6	2
Newcastle United	1988–89	First Division	29	0	4	0	4	0	37	0
Newcastle United	1989–90	Second Division	42	3	4	1	7	0	53	4
Newcastle United	1990–91	Second Division	42	0	1	0	3	1	46	1
Newcastle United	1991–92	Second Division	44	1	2	0	4	0	50	1
Newcastle United	1992–93	First Division	45	2	4	0	7	0	56	2
Newcastle United	1993–94	Premier League	18	0	1	0	2	0	21	0
Newcastle United	Total		227	8	16	1	31	2	274	11
Tottenham Hotspur	1993–94	Premier League	12	1	0	0	0	0	12	1
Tottenham Hotspur	1994–95	Premier League	4	0	0	0	0	0	4	0
Tottenham Hotspur	1995–96	Premier League	2	0	0	0	1	0	3	0
Tottenham Hotspur	Total		18	1	0	0	1	0	19	1
Port Vale (loan)	1994–95	First Division	17	1	0	0	0	0	17	1
Charlton Athletic (loan)	1996–97	First Division	4	0	0	0	0	0	4	0
Norwich City	1996–97	First Division	9	0	0	0	0	0	9	0
Norwich City	1997–98	First Division	24	0	1	0	1	0	26	0
Norwich City	1998–99	First Division	0	0	0	0	1	0	1	0
Norwich City	Total		33	0	1	0	2	0	36	0
Darlington (loan)	1998–99	Third Division	4	0	0	0	0	0	4	0
Career total			303	10	17	1	34	2	354	13

== Honours ==
Newcastle United Youth

- FA Youth Cup: 1984–85

Newcastle United

- Football League First Division: 1992–93
