= Danny Mills =

English professional footballer (born 1978)

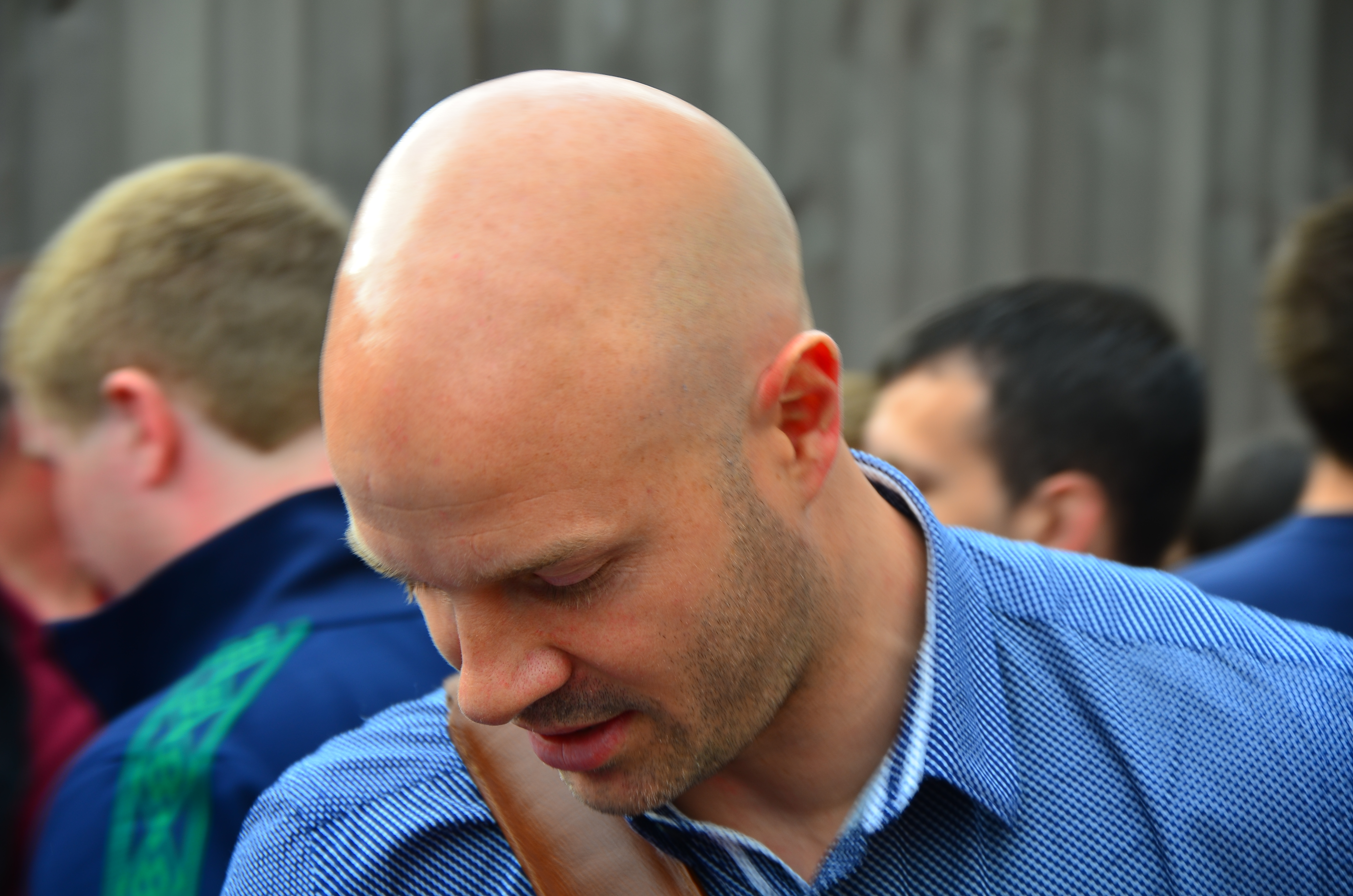

Personal information
- Full name: Daniel John Mills
- Date of birth: 18 May 1977 (age 49)
- Place of birth: Norwich, England
- Height: 1.81 m (5 ft 11 in)
- Position: Right-back

Youth career
- 1993–1994: Norwich City

Senior career*
Years	Team	Apps	(Gls)
1994–1998	Norwich City	66	(0)
1998–1999	Charlton Athletic	45	(3)
1999–2004	Leeds United	101	(3)
2003–2004	→ Middlesbrough (loan)	28	(0)
2004–2009	Manchester City	51	(1)
2006	→ Hull City (loan)	9	(0)
2007	→ Charlton Athletic (loan)	19	(0)
2008	→ Derby County (loan)	2	(0)
Total		321	(7)

International career
1994–1995	England U18	2	(0)
1998–2000	England U21	14	(3)
2001–2004	England	19	(0)
- * Club domestic league appearances and goals

Daniel John Mills (born 18 May 1977) is an English former professional footballer, his main position was right-back, though he could also play as a centre-back.

He earned 19 caps for the England national team and was starting right-back in the five games that England played in the 2002 FIFA World Cup. He retired in 2009 from the game at the age of 32 due to an ongoing knee injury.

== Club career ==
=== Early career ===
Mills began his career with Norwich City after coming through their youth system. He was unable to establish a regular place in the side and moved to Charlton Athletic in March 1998 and helped them win promotion to the Premier League via the play-offs, playing in their dramatic win over Sunderland in the play-off final, winning 7–6 on penalties after a 4–4 draw.

=== Leeds United ===
In June 1999, Mills signed for Leeds United in a £4.1 million transfer. He played a part in helping Leeds reach the 2000–01 UEFA Champions League Semi-final. Mills' Champions League debut came in Leeds' 4–0 defeat by Barcelona at the Camp Nou.

Mills spent the 2003–04 season on loan at Middlesbrough, where he played in the 2004 Football League Cup final to help Middlesbrough to their first ever major trophy.

Following relegation from the Premier League at the end of 2003–04, Leeds could no longer afford to retain Mills' services, and he moved to Manchester City on a free transfer in the close season, signing a five-year contract. As part of his severance package with Leeds, Mills continued to receive part of his wages from the Yorkshire club for the duration of his original Leeds contract. Mills often said that he would've liked to go back to Leeds again (along with Olivier Dacourt), but this never materialised. Mills has been seen at Leeds games with his son after the club's relegation to the Football League Championship.

=== Manchester City ===
Mills made his Manchester City debut in the opening fixture of the 2004–05 season, a 1–1 draw against Fulham at the City of Manchester Stadium. He started the majority of matches in his first season at Manchester City, but was dropped from the first team when Stuart Pearce replaced Kevin Keegan as manager in March 2005. He regained his place for the start of the 2005–06 season, and on 2 October 2005, he scored his first and only goal for Manchester City, a powerful shot from 25 yards (23 m) against Everton. One month later, he sustained a shin injury which resulted in a fifteen-game absence. The injury coincided with the emergence of Micah Richards who deposed him as first choice right-back; after Richards made his debut, Mills made only five further first team appearances in the remainder of the season.

On 14 September 2006 he joined Hull City in a two-month loan deal. He returned to Manchester City in January and was on the verge of being sent on loan to Hull City again or Leeds United, but a decision was made to keep him at City. Following the appointment of Sven-Göran Eriksson as Manchester City manager, Mills was transfer listed for loan. He re-joined former club Charlton on a loan deal until the end of 2007.

He joined Premier League strugglers Derby County on loan, in January 2008 until 2 May. However, he was injured in only his second game for the Rams, returning to City shortly after. On 1 July 2009, he was released by Manchester City after his contract finally expired. On 7 August 2009 Mills announced his retirement from all football during an appearance on BBC Radio 5 Live.

== International career ==
Following a series of impressive performances for Leeds United, Mills received his first England callup in 2001, making his international debut on 25 May 2001, as a substitute in a friendly against Mexico at Pride Park. His first England start came on 27 March 2002 in a friendly against Italy. At the 2002 FIFA World Cup, Mills was chosen as England's first choice right-back following an injury to Gary Neville, and he played every minute of England's five matches.

== Outside football ==
Mills is a patron of Shine (formerly the Association for Spina Bifida And Hydrocephalus), and has raised money for the charity since the death of his son Archie from the condition in 2002. He has also appeared on BBC Radio 5 Live's Fighting Talk. Mills now acts as a regular pundit and commentator (often alongside Alan Green) for BBC Radio 5 Live's coverage of the Premier League, League Cup, FA Cup, UEFA Champions League and England national football team matches. He also works as a pundit on Talksport.

In 2010, he competed in the Brighton Marathon in a wheelchair to raise money for Shine and the National Association of Disabled Supporters, completing the race in two hours, 43 minutes.

Mills was a runner up, along with Michael Underwood, on the 2012 series of Celebrity MasterChef. He was beaten by Emma Kennedy in a closely contested final.

In 2016, he ran the London Marathon for The Bobby Moore Fund, finishing in a time of 3 hours 14 mins 46 seconds. He had previously run the Yorkshire Marathon for the Jane Tomlinson Appeal in 3 hours 17 minutes.

== Personal life ==
His son George Mills won the 1500 metres British title in athletics. His younger son Stanley is a professional footballer who played for Everton and now plays for Preston North End.

== Career statistics ==
=== Club ===
Appearances and goals by club, season and competition
Club	Season	League			FA Cup		League Cup		Other		Total	
Club	Season	Division	Apps	Goals	Apps	Goals	Apps	Goals	Apps	Goals	Apps	Goals
Norwich City	1995–96	First Division	14	0	0	0	3	1	—		17	1
Norwich City	1996–97	First Division	32	0	1	0	2	0	—		35	0
Norwich City	1997–98	First Division	20	0	1	0	0	0	—		21	0
Norwich City	Total		66	0	2	0	5	1	—		73	1
Charlton Athletic	1997–98	First Division	9	1	—		—		2 (Note: Appearances in the First Division play-offs)	0	11	1
Charlton Athletic	1998–99	Premier League	36	2	1	0	3	0	—		40	2
Charlton Athletic	Total		45	3	1	0	3	0	2	0	51	3
Leeds United	1999–2000	Premier League	17	1	1	0	1	1	2 (Note: Appearances in the UEFA Cup)	0	21	2
Leeds United	2000–01	Premier League	23	0	1	0	0	0	16 (Note: Appearances in the UEFA Champions League)	0	40	0
Leeds United	2001–02	Premier League	28	1	1	0	2	0	8	0	39	1
Leeds United	2002–03	Premier League	33	1	4	0	1	0	3	0	41	1
Leeds United	Total		101	3	7	0	4	1	29	0	141	4
Middlesbrough (loan)	2003–04	Premier League	28	0	2	0	7	0	—		37	0
Manchester City	2004–05	Premier League	32	0	1	0	2	0	—		35	0
Manchester City	2005–06	Premier League	18	1	0	0	0	0	—		18	1
Manchester City	2006–07	Premier League	1	0	0	0	0	0	—		1	0
Manchester City	Total		51	1	1	0	2	0	—		54	1
Hull City (loan)	2006–07	Championship	9	0	—		—		—		9	0
Charlton Athletic (loan)	2007–08	Championship	19	0	—		0	0	—		19	0
Derby County (loan)	2007–08	Premier League	2	0	1	0	—		—		3	0
Career total			321	7	14	0	21	2	31	0	387	9

=== International ===
Appearances and goals by national team and year
National team	Year	Apps	Goals
England	2001	3	0
England	2002	10	0
England	2003	5	0
England	2004	1	0
Total		19	0

== Honours ==
Charlton Athletic

- Football League First Division play-offs: 1998

Middlesbrough

- Football League Cup: 2003–04
