= Neil Adams (footballer) =

English footballer (born 1965)

Personal information
- Full name: Neil James Adams
- Date of birth: 23 November 1965 (age 60)
- Place of birth: Stoke-on-Trent, England
- Height: 5 ft 8 in (1.73 m)
- Position: Midfielder

Team information
- Current team: Norwich City (technical director)

Youth career
- 1983–1985: Stoke City

Senior career*
Years	Team	Apps	(Gls)
1985–1986	Stoke City	32	(4)
1986–1989	Everton	30	(1)
1989	→ Oldham Athletic (loan)	9	(0)
1989–1994	Oldham Athletic	177	(27)
1994–1999	Norwich City	206	(30)
1999–2001	Oldham Athletic	47	(4)
Total		501	(66)

International career
1986	England U21	3	(0)

Managerial career
- 2014–2015: Norwich City
- * Club domestic league appearances and goals

Neil James Adams (born 23 November 1965) is an English former professional footballer and former manager who was most recently the technical director of EFL Championship club Norwich City.

He played as a midfielder for Stoke City, Everton, Oldham Athletic and Norwich City. Adams began his career playing for his local club Stoke City, where he quickly earned a reputation of being a tricky and productive winger. This prompted Everton to pay a fee of £150,000 for his signature in June 1986. He was part of the Everton's Championship-winning squad in 1987, but after three years at Goodison Park he turned down the offer of a new contract and moved to Oldham Athletic. At Oldham, Adams played a major role in helping the club win the Championship and gain promotion to the newly formed Premier League in 1992, and he also helped the Latics to reach the 1990 League Cup Final. He signed for Norwich City in February 1994 for a fee of £250,000, and became a regular in the Norwich team for the next six seasons, before ending his playing career with another two years at Oldham. After retiring from playing, Adams became a pundit for BBC Radio Norfolk, before taking up a coaching role at the Norwich City Academy – guiding the U-18 team to victory in the 2012–13 FA Youth Cup. In April 2014 Adams was appointed first-team manager following the departure of Chris Hughton.

== Playing career ==
Adams was born in Stoke-on-Trent and began his career with local side Stoke City making his professional debut against Coventry City in the Full Members Cup in 1985–86. He made a huge impression with his performances for Stoke in his debut season, with his attacking creativity and deadly accurate crossing ability earning him a call up to the England U21 side for their European Championship semi-final tie in Italy. With Stoke's finances poor and many top-flight sides showing an interest in signing him, he was sold to Everton in June 1986 for a fee of £150,000 after the Toffees beat off competition from Arsenal and Tottenham Hotspur, much to the annoyance to the Stoke supporters who feared that their club was becoming a 'selling club'.

In his first season at Everton he helped the side win the First Division title in 1986–87. During his three years on Merseyside he also won two Charity Shield medals, played in the Super Cup Final, played at Wembley in the Football League Centenary matches, and earned his first England U-21 cap in an away game against Sweden. In June 1989 he rejected the offer of a new contract at Goodison Park and joined Oldham Athletic in a £100,000 deal. The five seasons that Adams spent at Boundary Park was to coincide with the club's golden period. In 1990, he played for the Latics in the League Cup Final against Nottingham Forest, and the following season he helped the team win the Second Division title as Oldham won promotion to the newly formed Premier League.

Adams' contribution from the right flank helped Oldham establish themselves against the best sides in the country, and he was influential in helping the Latics maintain their top-flight status during their 1992–93 campaign by scoring 9 goals – including crucial strikes against Liverpool, Everton, Chelsea and most memorably the only goal in a 1–0 defeat of soon-to-be-crowned double winners, Manchester United, an achievement that placed Adams in Premier League record books as being in the top 10 highest goalscoring midfielders in their Premier League debut seasons.

Whilst at Oldham he also picked up a Carling No. 1 Award, awarded for the Premier League's most exciting players – selected by a Premiership committee before the start of the 1993–94 season. In early 1994 Norwich City made inquiries about acquiring his services, and after protracted negotiations between the two clubs he eventually signed for the Canaries for a fee of £250,000 in mid-February. Adams was to become a regular in the Norwich side during his time at Carrow Road. He assumed the role of penalty taker and dead ball specialist for the Canaries, and in his career he only missed from the spot once, in a league cup game against Swansea.

He started in all but one of Norwich's games during the 1996–97 campaign, and completed that season as the Canaries' second top-scorer with a total of 16 goals. In 2002, Norwich fans voted Adams into the Norwich City F.C. Hall of Fame. After leaving Norfolk in the summer of 1999, Adams returned to former club Oldham for two seasons before a cruciate knee injury forced him to retire.

== Managerial career ==
A holder of the UEFA Pro-Licence, he returned to Norwich where was appointed as manager of the club's U-18s. Adams guided the side to victory over Chelsea in the 2012–13 FA Youth Cup. On 6 April 2014 he was appointed Norwich City first-team caretaker manager for Norwich's 5 remaining Premier League matches of the season against Fulham, Manchester United, Liverpool, Chelsea and Arsenal, following the departure of Chris Hughton. On 22 May 2014 he was appointed permanent manager of Norwich City, signing a three-year contract. On 5 January 2015, and with Norwich in 7th place in the Championship table, Adams surprisingly resigned from his position. On 31 July 2015, Adams returned to Norwich City as Loan Player Manager, a role he fulfilled until September 2021 when he was promoted to Assistant Sporting Director, and then Technical Director in 2023 In March 2026, it was announced that Adams would leave his role at Norwich City at the end of the season for retirement.

== Career statistics ==
Club	Season	League			FA Cup		League Cup		Other^{[A]}		Total	
Club	Season	Division	Apps	Goals	Apps	Goals	Apps	Goals	Apps	Goals	Apps	Goals
Stoke City	1985–86	Second Division	32	4	1	0	3	0	3	0	39	4
Everton	1986–87	First Division	12	0	0	0	3	0	5	0	20	0
Everton	1987–88	First Division	8	0	0	0	1	1	1	0	10	1
Everton	1988–89	First Division	0	0	0	0	1	0	0	0	1	0
Everton	Total		20	0	0	0	5	1	6	0	31	5
Oldham Athletic	1988–89	Second Division	9	0	0	0	0	0	0	0	9	0
Oldham Athletic	1989–90	Second Division	27	4	6	0	6	0	1	0	40	4
Oldham Athletic	1990–91	Second Division	31	6	2	1	1	0	0	0	34	7
Oldham Athletic	1991–92	First Division	26	4	2	1	1	0	0	0	29	5
Oldham Athletic	1992–93	Premier League	32	9	1	0	4	0	0	0	37	5
Oldham Athletic	1993–94	Premier League	13	0	1	0	3	0	0	0	17	0
Oldham Athletic	Total		138	23	12	2	15	0	1	0	166	25
Norwich City	1993–94	Premier League	14	0	0	0	0	0	0	0	14	0
Norwich City	1994–95	Premier League	33	3	3	0	6	1	0	0	42	3
Norwich City	1995–96	First Division	42	3	1	0	5	0	0	0	48	3
Norwich City	1996–97	First Division	45	13	2	1	2	2	0	0	49	16
Norwich City	1997–98	First Division	30	4	0	0	2	1	0	0	32	5
Norwich City	1998–99	First Division	18	3	1	0	2	0	0	0	21	3
Norwich City	Total		182	25	7	1	17	4	0	0	206	30
Oldham Athletic	1999–2000	Second Division	29	2	2	1	2	0	1	0	34	4
Oldham Athletic	2000–01	Second Division	18	2	0	0	2	0	0	0	20	2
Oldham Athletic	Total		47	4	2	1	4	0	1	0	54	6
Career Total			419	56	22	4	44	5	11	0	501	66

A. The "Other" column constitutes appearances and goals in the FA Charity Shield, Full Members Cup, Football League Trophy and Screen Sport Super Cup.

== Managerial statistics ==
As of 5 January 2015

Managerial record by team and tenure
Team	From	To	Record					Ref
Team	From	To	P	W	D	L	Win %	Ref
Norwich City	6 April 2014	5 January 2015	32	11	8	13	34.4	
Total			32	11	8	13	34.4	—

== Honours ==
Oldham Athletic

- Football League Second Division: 1990–91
- Football League Cup runner-up: 1989–90
