= Ade Akinbiyi =

Nigeria international footballer (born 1974)

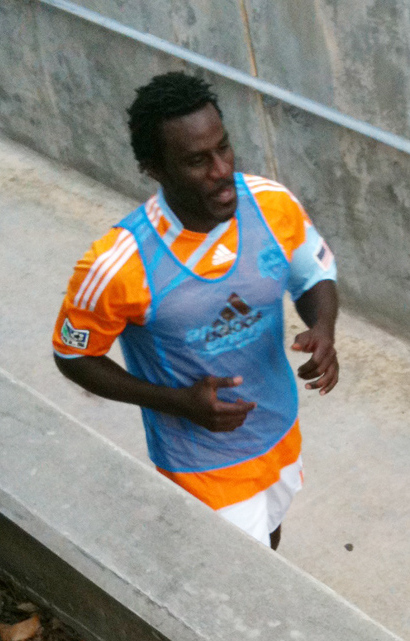
- Akinbiyi in 2009

Personal information
- Full name: Adeola Oluwatoyin Akinbiyi
- Date of birth: 10 October 1974 (age 52)
- Place of birth: Hackney, England
- Height: 6 ft 1 in (1.85 m)
- Position: Forward

Youth career
- Senrab
- 1991–1993: Norwich City

Senior career*
| Years | Team | Apps | (Gls) |
| 1993–1997 | Norwich City | 49 | (3) |
| 1994 | → Hereford United (loan) | 4 | (2) |
| 1994 | → Brighton & Hove Albion (loan) | 7 | (4) |
| 1997–1998 | Gillingham | 63 | (28) |
| 1998–1999 | Bristol City | 47 | (21) |
| 1999–2000 | Wolverhampton Wanderers | 37 | (16) |
| 2000–2002 | Leicester City | 58 | (11) |
| 2002–2003 | Crystal Palace | 24 | (3) |
| 2003 | → Stoke City (loan) | 4 | (2) |
| 2003–2005 | Stoke City | 59 | (17) |
| 2005–2006 | Burnley | 39 | (16) |
| 2006–2007 | Sheffield United | 18 | (3) |
| 2007–2009 | Burnley | 70 | (10) |
| 2009 | Houston Dynamo | 14 | (0) |
| 2009–2010 | Notts County | 10 | (0) |
| 2013–2015 | Colwyn Bay | 2 | (0) |
| Total | | 505 | (136) |

International career
| 1999 | Nigeria | 1 | (0) |
- * Club domestic league appearances and goals

Adeola Oluwatoyin Akinbiyi (born 10 October 1974) is a football coach and former professional player.

As a player he was a forward who notably played in the Premier League for Norwich City, Leicester City and Sheffield United, as well as in Major League Soccer with Houston Dynamo. He has had a much-travelled career with many different clubs with transfer fees totalling more than £11.5 million during his career, including being Leicester City's record signing (at £5.3 million) at the time. He also played in the Football League with Hereford United, Brighton & Hove Albion, Gillingham, Bristol City, Wolverhampton Wanderers, Crystal Palace, Stoke City, Burnley and Notts County. Born in England, Akinbiyi qualified to play for the Nigeria national team through his parents, and earned one cap for Nigeria in 1999.

In 2013 he was appointed as player-coach at non-league side Colwyn Bay. He remained with the club for several seasons before taking up a sports consultancy role in Africa.

== Club career ==
=== Early career ===
Akinbiyi began his career as a trainee at Norwich City, where he worked his way up into the first team in 1992. He made his début on 3 November 1993 as a substitute against German club Bayern Munich in the UEFA Cup. The match ended 1–1, meaning that Norwich won the second round tie 3–2 on aggregate and went on to face Inter Milan, who eliminated them. He was loaned to Hereford United and Brighton & Hove Albion before completing a £250,000 move to Gillingham in 1997. He scored 29 goals in 67 league and cup games for the Gills and was quickly transferred to newly promoted First Division side Bristol City for £1.2 million.

=== Big money moves ===
Akinbiyi's stock continued to rise and after scoring 21 goals for Bristol City in the 1998–99 season, Wolverhampton Wanderers paid a club record £3.5 million for him in September 1999 in an attempt to replace Robbie Keane. He played only one season at Molineux, finishing as the club's top goalscorer with 16 goals but Wolves just missed out on a playoff place.

Ten months after arriving at Wolves, he departed to Premier League club Leicester City for £5.5 million, a decision he would later regret. Brought in as a replacement for Emile Heskey (who left for Liverpool for £11 million), he failed to live up to expectations, scoring only 11 goals in 58 league appearances.

His spell at Leicester hit rock bottom in a 4–1 defeat at home to Liverpool. He missed four easy chances, including a miss from six yards in the last minute. He was booed by Leicester fans whose patience with Akinbiyi had run out. Soon after, he scored his first league goal of the season in a crucial 1–0 win at home to Sunderland, which prompted him to say that "hopefully this will start a flood of goals for me".

Leicester transferred Akinbiyi to Crystal Palace for £2.2 million in February 2002. On arrival he took the surprisingly high number 55 shirt, adding a very small plus sign between the numbers to signify his preferred shirt number, 10, which was already taken. Having scored just one goal in 14 league and cup appearances, he was loaned out to Stoke City in 2003. He scored twice – the second goal coming in the last game of the 2002–03 season, when the Potters beat Reading 1–0 to retain their second tier status. He later joined on a permanent basis, on a free transfer in September 2003. He scored ten goals in 2003–04 and won the Player of the Year award. In 2004–05, Akinbiyi scored seven goals in 30 matches and was subject to bids from Sheffield United. All of Sheffield United's offers were turned down by Stoke but an offer from Burnley was accepted.

=== Burnley ===
Akinbiyi completed a £600,000 move to Burnley in February 2005, but marked his debut by getting sent off within two minutes for head butting Sunderland player George McCartney. After netting 16 times for the Clarets, he moved to Sheffield United for a then club record £1.75 million in January 2006.

=== Sheffield United ===
Akinbiyi scored on his debut for the Blades against Derby County, and endeared himself to fans by scoring in his first Steel City derby at Hillsborough. After winning promotion, Akinbiyi made only five appearances for the Blades in the Premier League in 2006. It was also reported that he was involved in a training ground bust-up with teammate Claude Davis in October 2006 following a 2–0 defeat against Everton in which Davis had been sent off.

=== Return to Burnley ===
Akinbiyi was soon resold to Burnley in January 2007 for a fee of £650,000 with a further £100,000 to be paid in the summer of 2007. His second debut for the Clarets was more successful, scoring a goal against top flight Reading in the FA Cup.

During the rest of the 2006–07 season, Akinbiyi was not as successful as during his first spell at Turf Moor, scoring three goals. This was attributed by Steve Cotterill to Akinbiyi having spent too much time in the weights room at Sheffield United and as a result being too bulky. He was given the number nine shirt for the 2007–08 season but found himself behind Andy Gray and Robbie Blake as a first choice striker. After going back to Burnley, Akinbiyi lacked consistent form, finding goals harder to come by. His hard work and endeavour made him a firm fans' favourite. During the 2008–09 season, his regular position on the bench was taken by youngster Jay Rodriguez, a player who he had been mentoring. However, Akinbiyi regained his place on the bench in the fifth round of the League Cup against Chelsea at Stamford Bridge and in the 69th minute he scored to make the game 1–1 and take it into extra time. Burnley won 5–4 on penalties. While at Burnley, Steve Cotterill, Burnley's then manager, banned him from the gym. "I wasn't playing at Sheffield so the only thing I was doing was weights. We didn't even have reserve games and it was something to do. I put on a bit too much muscle and I lost about a yard of pace", he said. "I try to stay away from the weights room now. I'm sort of addicted."

=== Houston Dynamo ===
On 26 March 2009, Akinbiyi was reported to be in talks about a move to the United States to join Major League Soccer club Houston Dynamo. On 30 March, Akinbiyi was officially unveiled as a Houston player. He made his MLS debut on 3 May, as a late substitute in a game against New England Revolution.

To make room on the roster for Luis Ángel Landín, the club's first Designated Player, the Dynamo released Akinbiyi on 20 August 2009.

=== Notts County ===
After his release by Houston, Akinbiyi agreed terms with League Two side Notts County. He made his debut on 17 October 2009 in a 0–0 draw against Rotherham United, coming on as a substitute for Lee Hughes in the 82nd minute.

On 10 May 2010, it was announced that he had been released by Notts County along with seven other players.

=== Free agent (2010–2013) ===
In January 2011, after eight months without a club, Akinbiyi was on the verge of joining Newport County in the Conference National. He had been training with Premier League club Stoke City, and was recommended to Newport by Stoke's Newport-born manager Tony Pulis; Pulis had been Akinbiyi's manager at Stoke between 2003 and 2005. However, Newport subsequently pulled out of the deal.

Akinbiyi spent the next two years as a free agent.

=== Colwyn Bay ===
Having been without a club for three years, he was widely assumed to have retired from football by the time of his signing for Conference North side Colwyn Bay, as player-coach on 25 July 2013. He left Colwyn in January 2015.

== International career ==
Born in Hackney, London to Nigerian parents, Akinbiyi qualified to play internationally for Nigeria, and through his birthplace for England. He was called up on three occasions for Nigeria, playing once in 1999 against Greece in Kilkis, Central Macedonia.

== Personal life ==
Akinbiyi has worked as a sports academy consultant and largely in both Nigeria and Ghana.

== Career statistics ==
=== Club ===
Appearances and goals by club, season and competition
| Club | Season | League | | | National cup | | League cup | | Other | | Total | |
| Club | Season | Division | Apps | Goals | Apps | Goals | Apps | Goals | Apps | Goals | Apps | Goals |
|---|---|---|---|---|---|---|---|---|---|---|---|---|
| Norwich City | 1993–94 | Premier League | 2 | 0 | 0 | 0 | 0 | 0 | 1 (Note: Appearances in UEFA Cup) | 0 | 3 | 0 |
| Norwich City | 1994–95 | Premier League | 13 | 0 | 2 | 0 | 1 | 0 | ― | | 16 | 0 |
| Norwich City | 1995–96 | First Division | 22 | 3 | 0 | 0 | 3 | 2 | ― | | 25 | 5 |
| Norwich City | 1996–97 | First Division | 12 | 0 | 0 | 0 | 2 | 0 | ― | | 14 | 0 |
| Norwich City | Total | | 49 | 3 | 2 | 0 | 6 | 2 | 1 | 0 | 58 | 5 |
| Hereford United (loan) | 1993–94 | Third Division | 4 | 2 | ― | | ― | | ― | | 4 | 2 |
| Brighton & Hove Albion (loan) | 1994–95 | Second Division | 7 | 4 | ― | | ― | | ― | | 7 | 4 |
| Gillingham | 1996–97 | Second Division | 19 | 7 | ― | | ― | | ― | | 19 | 7 |
| Gillingham | 1997–98 | Second Division | 44 | 21 | 2 | 1 | 2 | 0 | 1 (Note: Appearance in Football League Trophy) | 0 | 49 | 22 |
| Gillingham | Total | | 63 | 28 | 2 | 1 | 2 | 0 | 1 | 0 | 68 | 29 |
| Bristol City | 1998–99 | First Division | 44 | 19 | 1 | 0 | 4 | 4 | – | | 49 | 23 |
| Bristol City | 1999–2000 | Second Division | 3 | 2 | – | | 1 | 0 | – | | 4 | 2 |
| Bristol City | Total | | 47 | 21 | 1 | 0 | 5 | 4 | – | | 53 | 25 |
| Wolverhampton Wanderers | 1999–2000 | First Division | 37 | 16 | 3 | 0 | – | | – | | 40 | 16 |
| Leicester City | 2000–01 | Premier League | 37 | 9 | 4 | 1 | 0 | 0 | 2 | 0 | 43 | 10 |
| Leicester City | 2001–02 | Premier League | 21 | 2 | 2 | 0 | 1 | 1 | – | | 24 | 3 |
| Leicester City | Total | | 58 | 11 | 6 | 1 | 1 | 1 | 2 | 0 | 67 | 13 |
| Crystal Palace | 2001–02 | First Division | 14 | 2 | – | | – | | – | | 14 | 2 |
| Crystal Palace | 2002–03 | First Division | 10 | 1 | 4 | 0 | 0 | 0 | – | | 14 | 1 |
| Crystal Palace | Total | | 24 | 3 | 4 | 0 | 0 | 0 | – | | 28 | 3 |
| Stoke City (loan) | 2002–03 | First Division | 4 | 2 | – | | – | | – | | 4 | 2 |
| Stoke City | 2003–04 | First Division | 30 | 10 | 1 | 0 | 1 | 0 | ― | | 32 | 10 |
| Stoke City | 2004–05 | Championship | 29 | 7 | 1 | 0 | 0 | 0 | ― | | 30 | 7 |
| Stoke City | Total | | 63 | 19 | 2 | 0 | 1 | 0 | ― | | 66 | 19 |
| Burnley | 2004–05 | Championship | 10 | 4 | ― | | ― | | ― | | 10 | 4 |
| Burnley | 2005–06 | Championship | 29 | 12 | 1 | 0 | 3 | 2 | ― | | 33 | 14 |
| Burnley | Total | | 39 | 16 | 1 | 0 | 3 | 2 | ― | | 43 | 18 |
| Sheffield United | 2005–06 | Championship | 15 | 3 | ― | | ― | | ― | | 15 | 3 |
| Sheffield United | 2006–07 | Premier League | 3 | 0 | ― | | 2 | 1 | ― | | 5 | 1 |
| Sheffield United | Total | | 18 | 3 | 0 | 0 | 2 | 1 | ― | | 20 | 4 |
| Burnley | 2006–07 | Championship | 20 | 2 | 1 | 1 | ― | | ― | | 21 | 3 |
| Burnley | 2007–08 | Championship | 39 | 8 | 1 | 0 | 3 | 1 | ― | | 43 | 9 |
| Burnley | 2008–09 | Championship | 11 | 0 | 0 | 0 | 4 | 1 | ― | | 15 | 1 |
| Burnley | Total | | 70 | 10 | 2 | 1 | 7 | 2 | ― | | 79 | 13 |
| Houston Dynamo | 2009 | Major League Soccer | 14 | 0 | 3 | 1 | ― | | 1 (Note: Appearance in CONCACAF Champions League) | 0 | 18 | 1 |
| Notts County | 2009–10 | League Two | 10 | 0 | 1 | 0 | ― | | 0 | 0 | 11 | 0 |
| Colwyn Bay | 2013–14 | Conference North | 2 | 0 | 0 | 0 | ― | | 0 | 0 | 2 | 0 |
| Colwyn Bay | 2014–15 | Conference North | 0 | 0 | 0 | 0 | ― | | 0 | 0 | 0 | 0 |
| Colwyn Bay | Total | | 2 | 0 | 0 | 0 | ― | | 0 | 0 | 2 | 0 |
| Career total | | | 505 | 136 | 21 | 4 | 27 | 12 | 5 | 0 | 564 | 152 |

=== International ===
Appearances and goals by national team and year
| National team | Year | Apps | Goals |
|---|---|---|---|
| Nigeria | 1999 | 1 | 0 |
| Total | | 1 | 0 |

== Honours ==
Burnley

- Football League Championship play-offs: 2009

Notts County

- Football League Two: 2009–10

Individual

- Bristol City Player of the Season: 1998–99
- Stoke City Player of the Season: 2003–04
- Championship Player of the Month: August 2004
