= Adrian Forbes =

English footballer (born 1979)

Personal information
- Full name: Adrian Emmanuel Forbes
- Date of birth: 23 January 1979 (age 47)
- Place of birth: Greenford, England
- Height: 5 ft 8 in (1.73 m)
- Position: Right midfielder

Team information
- Current team: Texoma FC (Head Coach & Sporting Director)

Youth career
- –1996: Norwich City

Senior career*
| Years | Team | Apps | (Gls) |
| 1996–2001 | Norwich City | 112 | (8) |
| 2001–2004 | Luton Town | 75 | (14) |
| 2004–2006 | Swansea City | 69 | (11) |
| 2006–2008 | Blackpool | 36 | (1) |
| 2008–2009 | Millwall | 13 | (0) |
| 2009 | → Grimsby Town (loan) | 15 | (3) |
| 2009–2010 | Grimsby Town | 13 | (1) |
| 2010–2012 | Lowestoft Town | 33 | (4) |
| Total | | 363 | (38) |

International career
| 1997 | England U18 | 2 | (0) |

Managerial career
- 2025: Texoma FC
- * Club domestic league appearances and goals

Adrian Emmanuel Forbes (born 23 January 1979) is an English former professional footballer and current head coach and sporting director for USL League One club Texoma FC.

As a player, he was a midfielder and forward from 1996 until 2012. Having started his career with Norwich City in 1996 he remained with the club for six years establishing himself in the Canaries' first team before moving to Luton Town in 2001. He went on to play for Swansea City, Blackpool, Millwall and Grimsby Town. Having been relegated out of the Football League with Grimsby in 2010, he was released by the club; he subsequently dropped into non-league, joining Lowestoft Town, where he remained for two seasons before retiring from competitive football in May 2012.

Forbes scored the last league goal for Swansea City at the Vetch Field against Shrewsbury Town on 30 April 2005 in a 1–0 win in front of 11,469 past a young Joe Hart . He then went on to score the winning goal against Bury to secure promotion to League 1 with a volley after 15 seconds in front of 6000 travelling Swansea fans.

== Career ==
=== Norwich City ===
Forbes began his career at Norwich City in 1995. He played under several different managers in his six years at Carrow Road, including Martin O'Neill, Mike Walker and Bruce Rioch. Forbes remained with City from 1996 to 2001, he played in 131 league games, scoring 8 goals.

=== Luton Town ===
In the summer of 2001 he moved to Luton Town in a £60,000 deal, and played in three seasons at Kenilworth Road, notably playing his best football under Mike Newell.

=== Swansea City ===
Forbes signed for Swansea City, who were then in Football League Two, on a free transfer in 2004. In his first season at the club he was ever-present and scored seven goals. On 30 April 2005, Forbes scored Swansea's last-ever league goal at their Vetch Field stadium in a 1–0 win over Shrewsbury Town, before their move to the Liberty Stadium. The following match he scored again against Bury to earn the club automatic promotion to Football League One. Two years later, in May 2006, he was released by Swansea. Forbes claimed that there had been on-going discussions about a new contract and that he had expected to stay at the club. He reacted by saying he was "shocked and hurt" and that he left "with a very bitter taste" in his mouth about the way the club treated him.

=== Blackpool ===
On 1 July he signed for Blackpool on a two-year contract with an option for a further year. In December 2006, before Blackpool played Swansea at Bloomfield Road, Forbes publicly slated Swansea manager Kenny Jackett for the manner in which he was released from the club earlier that year, stating that he was still bitter at Jackett. He scored his first goal for Blackpool on 6 March 2007, in a 2–0 win over AFC Bournemouth at Bloomfield Road. He played in Blackpool's Play-off final win over Yeovil Town at Wembley Stadium which earned the club promotion to the Football League Championship for the first time since 1978. Forbes has stated that he did not feel welcomed at Blackpool during his time there. "It’s well documented that I had a real tough time there. The fans didn't take to me in any way, shape or form. They couldn't see anything that I brought to the table, although my teammates did. For whatever reason, the Blackpool fans didn't like the way I played, and vocalised it."

=== Millwall ===
On 3 January 2008, after failing to establish himself in Blackpool's Championship side, Forbes signed an 18-month contract with Football League One club Millwall despite recently being managed by Kenny Jackett who released him at Swansea City over a year earlier. Forbes however only played 13 times for the club and struggled to establish himself as a first team player.

=== Grimsby Town ===
Forbes signed for Grimsby Town, managed by Mike Newell, on 2 February 2009, signing on loan until the end of the 2008–2009 season. In his second game he scored an overhead kick to equalise in the 3–3 draw with Barnet. On 6 July 2009 following his release from Millwall, Forbes agreed to join Grimsby permanently on a two-year deal. During the 09/10 season, Forbes struggled to break into the first team and was eventually ruled out for a lengthy period after breaking his leg. This coupled with playing second fiddle to other players and the failure to consistently earn a place in the team meant that he would only feature in 13 league matches throughout the entire season. Forbes had returned to fitness towards the end of the campaign but only made a cameo appearance as the season wound to a close. On 12 May 2010, Forbes was one of seven players placed who were deemed surplus to requirements and were placed on the transfer list by Grimsby manager Neil Woods following their relegation from the Football League. After failing to find a new club, Forbes was handed a squad number for the 2010–2011 season along with Nick Colgan, Nick Hegarty and Chris Jones who has also failed to sign terms elsewhere. On 13 July it was announced that Grimsby had accepted a request to let Forbes join league rivals Darlington for 3 days of training with a view to a permanent move. Darlington had also requested to use Forbes in a friendly in which Grimsby boss Neil Woods declined. Forbes had his contract at Grimsby cancelled by mutual consent on 1 September 2010.

=== Lowestoft Town ===
On 16 September 2010, Forbes joined Conference National side Hayes & Yeading on trial. On 30 September 2010 Forbes joined Lowestoft Town, signing a two-year deal. In May 2012 following the conclusion of the 2011–12 season Forbes announced his departure from Lowestoft and his retirement from competitive football.

== Coaching career ==
In October 2011 Forbes re-joined Norwich City as an academy coach on a part-time basis alongside his playing days with Lowestoft, however following his retirement in May 2012 Forbes became a full-time coach with City. After gaining a full-time role at Norwich's Cat 1 academy looking after the U9 and U10 players he was promoted in September 2017 and he is currently the Lead Foundation Phase Coach and responsible for the day-to-day running of the U9 to U12 age groups as well as being the match day announcer at Carrow Road. He is also in year 4 of The Premier Leagues Elite Coaches Apprenticeship Scheme.

He worked as the Head of Coaching & Player Development at Luton Town for five years before moving to the United States.

On 9 May 2024, Forbes was named as the first-ever sporting director for USL League One club Texoma FC. He was announced as head coach for Texoma on 17 October 2024.

== Career statistics ==
Appearances and goals by club, season and competition
| Club | Season | League | | | FA Cup | | League Cup | | Other | | Total | |
| Club | Season | Division | Apps | Goals | Apps | Goals | Apps | Goals | Apps | Goals | Apps | Goals |
|---|---|---|---|---|---|---|---|---|---|---|---|---|
| Norwich City | 1996–97 | First Division | 10 | 0 | 1 | 0 | 0 | 0 | 0 | 0 | 11 | 0 |
| Norwich City | 1997–98 | First Division | 33 | 4 | 0 | 0 | 0 | 0 | 0 | 0 | 33 | 4 |
| Norwich City | 1998–99 | First Division | 15 | 0 | 1 | 0 | 2 | 0 | 0 | 0 | 18 | 0 |
| Norwich City | 1999–2000 | First Division | 25 | 1 | 1 | 0 | 0 | 0 | 0 | 0 | 26 | 1 |
| Norwich City | 2000–01 | First Division | 29 | 3 | 1 | 0 | 3 | 0 | 0 | 0 | 33 | 3 |
| Norwich City | Total | | 112 | 8 | 4 | 0 | 5 | 0 | 0 | 0 | 121 | 8 |
| Luton Town | 2001–02 | Third Division | 40 | 4 | 1 | 1 | 1 | 0 | 0 | 0 | 42 | 5 |
| Luton Town | 2002–03 | Second Division | 5 | 1 | 0 | 0 | 0 | 0 | 0 | 0 | 5 | 1 |
| Luton Town | 2003–04 | Second Division | 27 | 9 | 4 | 5 | 0 | 0 | 1 (Note: Appearance(s) in Football League Trophy) | 0 | 32 | 14 |
| Luton Town | Total | | 72 | 14 | 5 | 6 | 1 | 0 | 1 | 0 | 79 | 20 |
| Swansea City | 2004–05 | League Two | 40 | 7 | 5 | 0 | 1 | 0 | 2 | 0 | 48 | 7 |
| Swansea City | 2005–06 | League One | 29 | 4 | 1 | 0 | 0 | 0 | 8 (Note: Six appearances and one goal in Football League Trophy, two appearances in Football League play-offs) | 1 | 38 | 5 |
| Swansea City | Total | | 69 | 11 | 6 | 0 | 1 | 0 | 10 | 1 | 86 | 12 |
| Blackpool | 2006–07 | League One | 34 | 1 | 5 | 0 | 0 | 0 | 4 (Note: One appearance in Football League Trophy, three in Football League play-offs) | 0 | 43 | 1 |
| Blackpool | 2007–08 | Championship | 2 | 0 | 0 | 0 | 1 | 0 | 0 | 0 | 3 | 0 |
| Blackpool | Total | | 36 | 1 | 5 | 0 | 1 | 0 | 4 | 0 | 46 | 1 |
| Millwall | 2007–08 | League One | 11 | 0 | 3 | 0 | 0 | 0 | 0 | 0 | 14 | 0 |
| Millwall | 2008–09 | League One | 2 | 0 | 0 | 0 | 0 | 0 | 0 | 0 | 2 | 0 |
| Millwall | Total | | 13 | 0 | 3 | 0 | 0 | 0 | 0 | 0 | 16 | 0 |
| Grimsby Town (loan) | 2008–09 | League Two | 15 | 3 | 0 | 0 | 0 | 0 | 0 | 0 | 15 | 3 |
| Grimsby Town | 2009–10 | League Two | 13 | 1 | 0 | 0 | 0 | 0 | 2 | 0 | 15 | 1 |
| Grimsby Town | 2010–11 | Conference Premier | 0 | 0 | 0 | 0 | 0 | 0 | 0 | 0 | 0 | 0 |
| Grimsby Town | Total | | 28 | 4 | 0 | 0 | 0 | 0 | 2 | 0 | 30 | 4 |
| Total | | | 330 | 38 | 23 | 6 | 8 | 0 | 17 | 1 | 378 | 45 |

== Honours ==
Swansea City

- Football League Trophy: 2005–06

Blackpool

- Football League One play-offs: 2007
