= Drewe Broughton =

English footballer (born 1978)

Personal information
- Full name: Drewe Oliver Broughton
- Date of birth: 25 October 1978 (age 48)
- Place of birth: Hitchin, England
- Height: 6 ft 3 in (1.91 m)
- Position: Striker

Senior career*
Years	Team	Apps	(Gls)
1996–1998	Norwich City	9	(1)
1997	→ Wigan Athletic (loan)	4	(0)
1998	Brentford	1	(0)
1998–2001	Peterborough United	35	(8)
2000	→ Nuneaton Borough (loan)	10	(2)
2000	→ Dagenham & Redbridge (loan)	9	(5)
2000–2001	→ Stevenage Borough (loan)	4	(3)
2001	→ Kidderminster Harriers (loan)	19	(7)
2001–2003	Kidderminster Harriers	75	(12)
2003–2005	Southend United	44	(2)
2004	→ Rushden & Diamonds (loan)	21	(6)
2004–2005	→ Wycombe Wanderers (loan)	3	(0)
2005–2006	Rushden & Diamonds	37	(10)
2006–2007	Chester City	14	(2)
2006–2007	→ Boston United (loan)	25	(8)
2007–2008	Milton Keynes Dons	13	(0)
2008	→ Wrexham (loan)	16	(2)
2008–2010	Rotherham United	57	(9)
2010	→ Lincoln City (loan)	7	(0)
2010–2011	Lincoln City	23	(0)
2011	→ AFC Wimbledon (loan)	8	(2)
2011	Alfreton Town	2	(1)
2011–2012	Thurrock	10	(1)
2012	Arlesey Town	2	(1)
2012	Darlington	11	(1)
Total		459	(83)
- * Club domestic league appearances and goals

Drewe Oliver Broughton (born 25 October 1978) is an English former professional footballer who played as a striker. He made over 540 senior appearances for 21 different clubs, scoring 116 goals, in a career spanning 17 years.

== Career ==
=== Earlier years ===
Broughton was born in Hitchin, Hertfordshire. He began his career as a trainee with Norwich City in 1996, where he made nine appearances scoring once against Wolverhampton Wanderers, and had a one-month loan spell at Wigan Athletic, in two seasons. He joined Brentford in October 1998 for a transfer fee of £100,000 and was sold within a month for the same fee to Peterborough United. He stayed at Peterborough for just over two years, making 35 league appearances and scoring eight goals.

=== Kidderminster ===
After spells on loan at non-League Nuneaton Borough, Dagenham & Redbridge and Stevenage Borough during the 1999–2000 and 2000–01 seasons, Broughton joined Kidderminster Harriers on a one-month loan in January 2001 and then joined Kidderminster on a permanent basis in February 2001. He made 94 league appearances for Kidderminster, scoring 19 goals, before joining Southend United in June 2003 on a two-year contract after being released by Kidderminster on a free transfer.

=== Southend, Rushden and Chester ===
At Southend, he proved a success in their run in the 2003–04 Football League Trophy. With Broughton scoring once against Luton Town and twice against QPR in earlier rounds, Southend faced Essex rivals Colchester United in the Area Final. In the first leg, he scored but was later sent off as the Shrimpers won 3–2. In the second leg, Broughton scored the winning aggregate goal, his fifth of the competition that season, to put Southend United in to the first National Final of their then 98-year history. Broughton played the full 90 minutes as they lost the overall final to Blackpool. However overall he did not feature regularly in the first team at Southend and joined Rushden & Diamonds on loan in October 2004, where he scored five goals in ten appearances, and then Wycombe Wanderers, before joining Rushden & Diamonds permanently in February 2005, where he made 51 appearances in all competitions in two seasons. Despite Broughton scoring ten goals in the 2005–06 season, Rushden were relegated to the Conference National following their defeat at Boston United in April 2006. Broughton joined Chester City on a two-year contract in June 2006. He made only 14 league appearances for Chester, and in October 2006, he joined Boston United on loan in October 2006 for the rest of the 2006–07 season, where he scored eight goals in 25 league appearances, but was unable to prevent Boston from being relegated from the Football League.

=== Milton Keynes Dons ===
Broughton was released by Chester upon his return, and joined Milton Keynes Dons in July 2007 after impressing during a one-week trial at the club. He scored his first and what turned out to be only goal for the club against Sheffield United in the League Cup. After starting just six times for MK Dons, he joined Wrexham on a one-month loan in January 2008. When his loan spell ended, he played in their Football League Trophy semi final win over Swansea City in February 2008 and scored the final penalty in a 5–4 penalty shootout that sent them to Wembley for the final, which his teammates went on to win in his absence. He then returned to Wrexham for a second loan spell, and scored two goals in 16 appearances for Wrexham before being released in April 2008. He was also released by MK Dons at the end of the 2007–08 season. Broughton joined Rotherham United on a short-term contract in August 2008. This was then extended to a one-year contract. He got his first Rotherham United goal in the 3–1 victory over Championship side Southampton.

=== Lincoln City ===
After a loan spell during the 09/10 season with Lincoln City, Broughton joined permanently in June 2010. On 18 February 2011 Broughton signed on loan for Conference National club AFC Wimbledon, causing some controversy due to his time spent with Milton Keynes Dons. On 19 February, Broughton scored on his debut after coming on as a substitute in a 5–2 away victory against Tamworth. His second goal for the club came a week later in a 4–1 home victory over Altrincham. He was recalled by Lincoln on 1 April due to injuries to strikers Delroy Facey and Ashley Grimes

In May 2011, he was not offered a new contract after a mass clear out of players following the club's relegation from the Football League. After being released, Broughton went on trial at Luton Town scoring two goals in a 4–2 victory over Hitchin Town in a pre-season friendly.

=== Return to non-League ===
On 8 September 2011, he joined Alfreton Town as a free agent, having been without a club since being released by Lincoln City. He had shaken off a minor hamstring injury which saw him have to be substituted during two run-outs in pre-season friendlies with Alfreton (against Sheffield United and Matlock Town). He debuted for the club in their 3–1 Conference defeat at his former club Kidderminster Harriers on 17 September 2011, scoring a 31st-minute penalty before attracting attention for an alleged elbow on Luke Jones. The incident was missed by the match referee but not by the referee's assessor who later requested a copy of the matchday DVD from Alfreton Town and, upon reviewing the incident, reported Broughton to the Football Association who took immediate action and banned him for three games. He returned from suspension to appear in the 5–2 defeat at Grimsby Town on 1 October 2011 but was sent-off for elbowing Gary Silk in the 86th minute. After being handed a four match ban for the offence, Broughton was sacked by the club on 5 October 2011, with Alfreton chairman Wayne Bradley commenting that "the actions of Drewe Broughton on Saturday were wholly unacceptable and the club has made a decision to sever relationships with the player. He was a non-contract player and, while we understand his disappointment with himself and his pleas that it was completely out of character for him, we have made our decision and he has kicked his last ball for Alfreton Town".

On 21 October 2011, it was announced that he had signed for Thurrock.

He moved on to Arlesey Town of the Southern League Premier Division, making his debut on 28 January 2012. Broughton scored his first goal for Arlesey in a home match against St Albans City on 18 February 2012, giving Arlesey an 18th-minute lead in a 1–1 draw.

Moving on in March 2012, Broughton signed for Conference National club Darlington and made his league debut for the financially troubled side, who were battling relegation after receiving a 10-point deduction having entered administration mid-season, at home to Stockport County on 3 March 2012. He scored his first goal for the club on his sixth appearance, a 3–3 away draw at AFC Telford United on 31 March 2012.

== Career statistics ==
Appearances and goals by club, season and competition
Club	Season	League			FA Cup		League Cup		Other		Total	
Club	Season	Division	Apps	Goals	Apps	Goals	Apps	Goals	Apps	Goals	Apps	Goals
Norwich City	1996–97	First Division	8	1	0	0	0	0	—		8	1
Norwich City	1997–98	First Division	1	0	0	0	0	0	—		1	0
Norwich City	Total		9	1	0	0	0	0	0	0	9	1
Wigan Athletic (loan)	1997–98	Second Division	4	0	0	0	0	0	—		4	0
Brentford	1998–99	Third Division	1	0	0	0	0	0	—		1	0
Peterborough United	1998–99	Third Division	26	7	0	0	0	0	2	1	28	8
Peterborough United	1999–2000	Third Division	10	1	0	0	2	0	—		12	1
Peterborough United	Total		36	8	0	0	2	0	2	1	40	9
Nuneaton Borough (loan)	1999–2000	Conference National	10	2	0	0	—		—		10	2
Dagenham & Redbridge (loan)	2000–01	Conference National	9	5	4	1	—		—		13	6
Stevenage Borough (loan)	2000–01	Conference National	4	3	0	0	—		—		4	3
Kidderminster Harriers (loan)	2000–01	Third Division	5	3	0	0	0	0	—		5	3
Kidderminster Harriers	2000–01	Third Division	14	4	0	0	0	0	—		14	4
Kidderminster Harriers	2001–02	League Two	38	8	0	0	1	0	2	0	41	8
Kidderminster Harriers	2002–03	League Two	37	4	2	2	1	0	3	2	43	8
Kidderminster Harriers	Total		94	19	2	2	2	0	5	2	103	23
Southend United	2003–04	League Two	35	2	2	0	1	1	7	5	45	8
Southend United	2004–05	League Two	9	0	0	0	1	0	1	0	11	0
Southend United	Total		44	2	2	0	2	1	8	5	56	8
Rushden & Diamonds (loan)	2004–05	League Two	9	4	1	1	0	0	—		10	5
Wycombe Wanderers (loan)	2004–05	League Two	3	0	0	0	0	0	—		3	0
Rushden & Diamonds	2004–05	League Two	12	2	0	0	0	0	—		12	2
Rushden & Diamonds	2005–06	League Two	37	10	1	0	0	0	1	0	39	10
Rushden & Diamonds	Total		49	12	1	0	0	0	1	0	51	12
Chester City	2006–07	League Two	14	2	0	0	1	0	—		15	2
Boston United (loan)	2006–07	League Two	25	8	1	0	0	0	—		26	8
Milton Keynes Dons	2007–08	League Two	13	0	1	0	1	1	4	0	19	1
Wrexham (loan)	2007–08	League Two	16	2	0	0	0	0	—		16	2
Rotherham United	2008–09	League Two	40	6	2	0	3	1	4	2	49	9
Rotherham United	2009–10	League Two	17	3	2	1	0	0	1	0	20	4
Rotherham United	Total		57	9	4	1	3	1	5	2	69	13
Lincoln City (loan)	2009–10	League Two	7	0	0	0	0	0	—		7	0
Lincoln City	2010–11	League Two	23	0	1	0	0	0	—		24	0
AFC Wimbledon (loan)	2010–11	Conference National	8	2	0	0	—		—		8	2
Alfreton Town	2011–12	Conference National	2	1	0	0	—		—		2	1
Thurrock	2011–12	Conference South	10	1	0	0	—		—		10	1
Arlesey Town	2011–12	Southern Football League Premier Division	2	1	0	0	—		—		2	1
Darlington	2011–12	Conference National	11	1	0	0	0	0	—		11	1
Career total			459	83	17	5	11	3	25	10	513	101

== Honours ==
Southend United

- Football League Trophy runner-up: 2003–04

Milton Keynes Dons

- Football League Two: 2007–08
