= Andy Johnson (footballer, born 1974) =

Wales international footballer

Personal information
- Full name: Andrew James Johnson
- Date of birth: 2 May 1974 (age 52)
- Place of birth: Bristol, England
- Position: Midfielder

Youth career
- Norwich City

Senior career*
Years	Team	Apps	(Gls)
1992–1997	Norwich City	66	(14)
1997–2001	Nottingham Forest	119	(9)
2001–2006	West Bromwich Albion	131	(7)
2006–2007	Leicester City	22	(1)
2007–2009	Barnsley	4	(0)
2009	King's Lynn	18	(0)
Total		342	(31)

International career
1998–2004	Wales	15	(0)
- * Club domestic league appearances and goals

Andrew James Johnson (born 2 May 1974) is a Welsh former international footballer who played as a midfielder.

== Club career ==
Johnson began his career at Norwich City, where he began to play regularly in midfield following relegation from the Premier League, with the noteworthy statistic of Norwich City never losing a competitive game where he scored. He joined Nottingham Forest in 1997 for £2.2m. Having made over one hundred appearances in Forest's squad, he moved on to West Bromwich Albion for £200,000 due to his contract expiring at the end of the season.

He made his Albion debut as a first-half substitute in a 1–0 defeat to Wimbledon on 22 September 2001. His first goal for the club was scored in a 3–2 defeat away at Barnsley on 28 October of the same year. His appearances for WBA ensured that they achieved the second promotion spot in the division and thus moved up to the Premier League. Johnson made his 100th league appearance for West Bromwich Albion during the 2003–04 league season, during which he also helped Albion to a second promotion in three years. He made several appearances for his chosen country, Wales, but failed to score a goal at international level.

After becoming a fans favourite at The Hawthorns, Johnson joined Leicester City in June 2006. He was heavily criticised for his performances by the City fans, especially in the 2–1 away defeat to Sheffield Wednesday on 4 November 2006. Following that performance, Johnson had a spell on the sidelines through injury, but then made a comeback and was the man of the match against Luton Town on 3 February 2007, and scored his first and only Leicester goal against Coventry City on 17 February 2007.

On 25 April 2007, it was announced that having not featured under manager Nigel Worthington Leicester had begun talks to terminate Johnson's contract early, and he was eventually released in May 2007. Johnson was signed by Barnsley on 8 June 2007.

Johnson started four Championship games for Barnsley in 2007, but lost his holding midfield position to the on-loan Brazilian Anderson De Silva, occasionally being named as a substitute. Barnsley manager Simon Davey placed Johnson on the transfer list in January 2008 and released the player from his contract twelve months later. Johnson joined non-league King's Lynn in January 2009. He was appointed assistant manager to Carl Heggs in June 2009; but left King's Lynn in September 2009 following a dispute with the club over unpaid wages from the previous season.

Johnson retired from football and changed his career to become an electrician.

== International career ==
Before playing for Wales, he was a member of England youth team. Johnson was an unused member of England U-20 team at 1993 FIFA World Youth Championship. In an interview with Undr the Cosh in 2022, Johnson stated that he "doesn't class himself as Welsh," and that he viewed the international break as "a holiday".

== Honours ==
Nottingham Forest

- Football League First Division: 1997–98
