= Jamie Shore =

English footballer

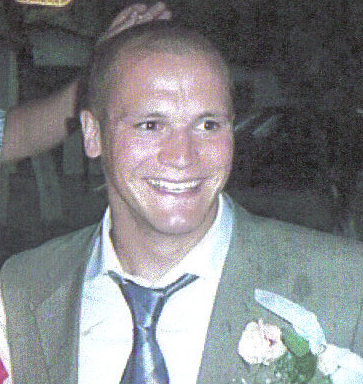

Personal information
- Date of birth: 1 September 1977 (age 49)
- Place of birth: Bristol, England
- Position: Midfielder

Youth career
- Whitchurch
- Milton Nomads
- Norwich City

Senior career*
Years	Team	Apps	(Gls)
1996–1998	Norwich City	0	(0)
1998–2002	Bristol Rovers	24	(2)
- Brislington
- Mangotsfield United
- * Club domestic league appearances and goals

Jamie Shore (born 1 September 1977) is an English former footballer.

== Career ==
After playing youth football in the Bristol area, Shore was scouted by Norwich City to join their elite youth setup at the age of 12. He signed his first professional contract on his 17th birthday, becoming the youngest player ever to sign as a professional with Norwich City.

Only five weeks after signing for Norwich, Shore suffered a knee injury while playing a South-East Counties youth game against Arsenal which would eventually cause an early end to his playing career.

In 1998 Shore had an unsuccessful trial at Aston Villa. He later signed for Bristol Rovers, where he made his league debut, but his knee injury forced to retire from professional football at the age of 24, having made just 29 first team appearances in all competitions, scoring five goals.

After retiring from full-time football, Shore later made his playing comeback for Brislington, and also went on to play for Mangotsfield United. He also worked for BBC Radio Bristol as a summariser on football commentaries, and started a soccer school called Jamie Shore Soccer International. He is now a coach with the South West Soccer Academy.

In October 2017, having previously been employed as the club's U18 manager, Shore returned to Yeovil Town as the club's first team coach.
