= Víctor Segura =

Spanish footballer

Personal information
- Full name: Víctor Segura Abascal
- Date of birth: 30 March 1973 (age 53)
- Place of birth: Zaragoza, Spain
- Height: 1.83 m (6 ft 0 in)
- Position: Centre-back

Youth career
- Zaragoza

Senior career*
Years	Team	Apps	(Gls)
1990–1993	Zaragoza B	69	(2)
1993–1994	Palamós	29	(0)
1994–1995	Logroñés	20	(1)
1995–1997	Lleida	13	(1)
1997–1999	Norwich City	29	(0)
1999–2000	Getafe	8	(1)
Total		168	(5)
- * Club domestic league appearances and goals

Víctor Segura Abascal (born 30 March 1973) is a Spanish former professional footballer who played as a central defender.

== Club career ==
A product of Real Zaragoza's youth ranks, Zaragoza-born Segura made his senior debut in the 1990–91 season with its B team, in the Segunda División B. Released by the Aragonese without making any competitive appearances, his first club as a professional was Palamós CF of Segunda División.

After a solid 1993–94, Segura was signed by La Liga side CD Logroñés, appearing regularly but facing relegation in 1995 in what was his sole top-flight campaign – the Riojan team ranked last with an all-time low 13 points, and he scored in a 4–2 home win against CD Tenerife where he was also sent off. He then spent two seasons with UE Lleida also in the second division.

Segura moved to England in 1997 with Norwich City, signed by manager Mike Walker on a Bosman transfer. His spell at Carrow Road was not a successful one, and he was released by Walker's successor Bruce Rioch two years later, having spent his final year majorly with the reserves.

Aged 27, Segura retired at the end of 1999–2000, after just eight second-tier matches with Getafe CF.
