= Robert Fleck =

Scottish footballer (born 1965)

Personal information
- Full name: Robert William Fleck
- Date of birth: 11 August 1965 (age 61)
- Place of birth: Glasgow, Scotland
- Position: Striker

Senior career*
Years	Team	Apps	(Gls)
1983–1987	Rangers	85	(29)
1983–1984	→ Partick Thistle (loan)	2	(1)
1987–1992	Norwich City	143	(39)
1992–1995	Chelsea	40	(3)
1993–1994	→ Bolton Wanderers (loan)	7	(1)
1995	→ Bristol City (loan)	10	(1)
1995–1998	Norwich City	104	(16)
1998–1999	Reading	9	(1)
2000–2001	Gorleston		
Total		400	(91)

International career
1990–1992	Scotland	4	(0)
1990	SFA (SFL centenary)	1	(0)

Managerial career
- 2000–2001: Gorleston (Player-manager)
- 2002–2006: Diss Town
- * Club domestic league appearances and goals

Robert William Fleck (born 11 August 1965) is a Scottish former professional football player and manager. Fleck played as a striker from 1983 until 2001, notably in the Scottish Premier League for Rangers, in England for Chelsea in the FA Premier League, and for Norwich City in the Football League.

Fleck also played for Bolton Wanderers, Bristol City and Reading. Fleck gained four caps for Scotland and featured in the 1990 World Cup. Fleck went into management in 2000 with Dr. Kenny Muir with a spell as player-managers of non-League club Gorleston, and later having a four-year spell in charge of Diss Town. Fleck was made a member of Norwich City's Hall of Fame. Since retiring as a player, he has worked in football management, but is now a teaching assistant in Norwich.

== Playing career ==
Born in Glasgow, Fleck started his senior career with Rangers under manager Jock Wallace, although it was only after the arrival of Graeme Souness as player-manager in 1986 that Fleck began to make a real impact, scoring 22 goals in 48 appearances in the 1986–87 season. Fleck's goal tally that season included four hat-tricks; in league games against Clydebank (twice) and Falkirk, and in a UEFA Cup tie against Ilves Tampere.

In December 1987 Fleck was transferred for £580,000 to Norwich City in the English Football League First Division. He scored 66 goals in 181 appearances in his first spell with the club, earning a call-up to the Scotland squad, winning four caps, including two at the 1990 World Cup. 'Flecky' attained hero status among Norwich supporters and was voted Norwich City player of the year in 1992 which was the final season of his first spell at Carrow Road. He helped them finish fourth in the league in 1989, when they also reached the FA Cup semi-final, though missed the match after his father passed away the night before. Norwich were unable to compete in the following season's UEFA Cup due to the ongoing ban on English clubs in European competitions that followed the Heysel disaster of 1985.

Fleck helped the Canaries reach another FA Cup semi-final in 1992, where they lost to Second Division underdogs Sunderland, Fleck returned from injury to play in this game but he was clearly unfit.

He controversially moved on to Chelsea for a (then) club record fee of £2.1 million just before the first season of the new Premier League got underway, Norwich turned down the bid, but he forced it through by threatening to go on strike and refusing to play for the club again. At the time the deal was a record sale for Norwich. The move proved unsuccessful; Fleck scored just four goals in 48 appearances and was loaned out to Bolton Wanderers and Bristol City. He missed out on a place in Chelsea's squad for the 1994 FA Cup Final, which they lost 4–0 to Manchester United.

Despite his dismal goalscoring record at Chelsea, he is remembered fondly by the club's fans, who sang a song in his honour – We all live in a Robert Fleck world – based on the lyrics of Yellow Submarine by The Beatles.

Fleck re-joined Norwich (who had just been relegated from the Premier League) for £650,000 in September 1995 after a loan spell. He initially made an impact and formed a solid strike partnership with Ashley Ward, but after Ward was sold due to Norwich's financial problems, Fleck's performances were inconsistent and the team were unable to gain promotion in any of his three seasons back at the club. He moved to Reading towards the end of the 1997–98 season, spending one season at the Berkshire club, and in nine league games he scored once against Luton Town (in the first game at the Madejski Stadium), before injury ended his playing career.

== Managerial career ==
After a spell as player-manager with Gorleston, where he won the Norfolk Senior Cup in 2001, he joined Diss Town who play in the Ridgeons League, as manager in the summer of 2002. He won the Norfolk Senior Cup again in 2003 and 2005. A poor run of form during 2006 saw him sacked on 18 October 2006. Fleck returned to employment with Norwich City in May 2007, when he joined the club's scouting network.

== Teaching career ==
Fleck was a teaching assistant at the Parkside School, "a Norwich school for children with complex needs", a career move that developed from running coaching sessions for children at the school.

== Legacy ==
Fleck is fourth in the list of Norwich City's all-time goalscorers, behind Johnny Gavin, Terry Allcock and Iwan Roberts. In 2002, Norwich fans voted him into the club's Hall of Fame.

== Personal life ==
Fleck is married to a "Norfolk girl" and has an adult daughter who is a beautician. While playing, Fleck funded trips for 18 months for a child with a terminal condition.

Fleck's nephew, John plays for Chesterfield FC.
