= Karl Simpson =

English footballer

Karl Edward Simpson (born 14 October 1976 in Newmarket) is a former professional footballer. He was a midfielder who began his career with Norwich City before he was released by the Canaries and moved into non-league football.

Simpson was sent off on his debut for Norwich on 20 September 1995 in a Football League Cup match against Torquay at Carrow Road.

Simpson had a stint as player manager and manager at Sinjun's Grammarians in the AFC league in london.

== Sources ==
- Davage, Mark; Eastwood, John; Platt, Kevin (2001). Canary Citizens. Jarrold Publishing. ISBN 0-7117-2020-7.
