= Keith O'Neill (footballer) =

Irish footballer

Personal information
- Full name: Keith Padre Gerard O'Neill
- Date of birth: 16 February 1976 (age 50)
- Place of birth: Dublin, Ireland
- Position: Midfielder

Youth career
- 1982–1989: Tolka Rovers
- 1989–1994: Home Farm

Senior career*
Years	Team	Apps	(Gls)
1994–1999	Norwich City	73	(9)
1999–2001	Middlesbrough	37	(0)
2001–2003	Coventry City	12	(0)
Total		122	(9)

International career
1996–1999	Republic of Ireland	13	(4)
- * Club domestic league appearances and goals

Keith O'Neill (born 16 February 1976) is a former professional footballer who represented the Republic of Ireland. He played as a left-sided midfielder, but could sometimes play as a striker. Despite being an exceptionally talented youngster, his career was ultimately cut short by successive injuries caused by a degenerative bone disease.

== Career ==
O'Neill began his playing career with Dublin side Tolka Rovers at the age of 6 before transferring to Home Farm.

As a promising youngster, O'Neill was spotted by several sides, including Norwich City, who went on to sign him when he was 18. O'Neill immediately impressed at the Norfolk club, despite being injury prone. The injury problems, some of them stemming him having suffered from spondylosis as a child, affected him virtually from the start of his career and ultimately curtailed his progress.

O'Neill went on to play for Middlesbrough and Coventry City. While at Coventry, he was diagnosed with two degenerative bone conditions in his spine, spondylolisthesis and spondylosis, which was essentially a double fracture of part of the cord that threatened to leave him disabled. These conditions eventually forced his retirement.

== International career ==
O'Neill made 13 appearances for his country, scoring four goals, including scoring twice against Bolivia at Giants Stadium in 1996.
