= Darren Eadie =

English footballer (born 1975)

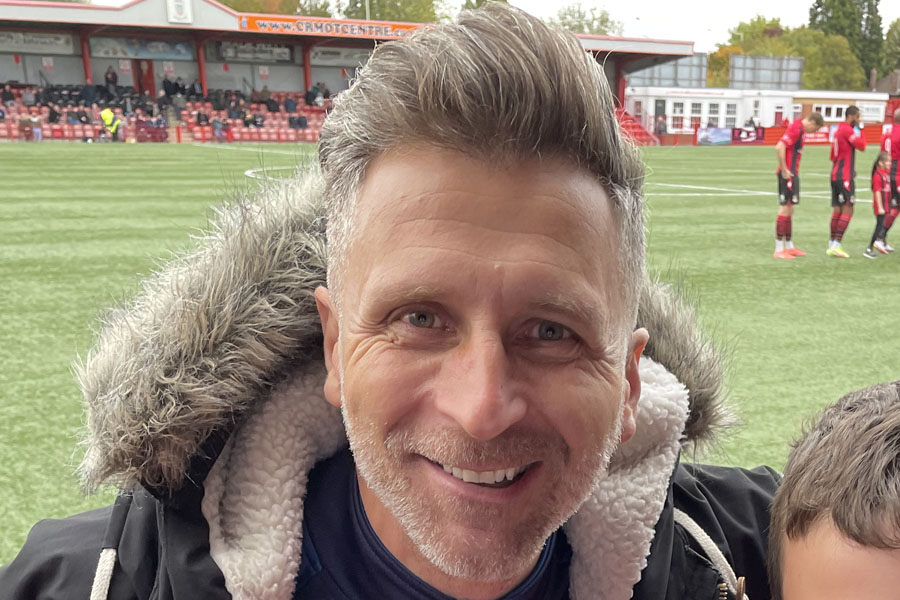
- Eadie in 2021

Personal information
- Full name: Darren Malcolm Eadie
- Date of birth: 10 June 1975 (age 51)
- Place of birth: Chippenham, England
- Position: Midfielder

Team information
- Current team: Leiston (head of football strategy)

Youth career
- Norwich City

Senior career*
| Years | Team | Apps | (Gls) |
| 1993–1999 | Norwich City | 168 | (35) |
| 1999–2003 | Leicester City | 40 | (2) |
| Total | | 208 | (37) |

International career
| 1994–1997 | England U21 | 7 | (2) |

Managerial career
- 2020–: Leiston
- * Club domestic league appearances and goals

Darren Malcolm Eadie (born 10 June 1975) is an English football manager and former professional footballer, who is head of football strategy at Leiston.

As a player, he made his name as a pacy left-sided midfielder with Norwich City before later joining Leicester City. He featured in both the Premier League and Football League for both teams. He was capped seven times by England U21, scoring twice before being called up in the full England team in 1997. He was part of England's squad that took part in the Tournoi de France, where he was named as a substitute, and did not go on to win a full cap.

== Early life ==
Born in Chippenham, Eadie attended the Corsham School in Wiltshire.

== Club career ==
Eadie was a product of Norwich City's youth system and made his debut in a UEFA Cup match against Vitesse Arnhem in September 1993. By the time they were relegated at the end of the following season, he was Norwich's regular left winger. Even though he was unable to inspire Norwich to a return to the Premier League, his form for the club was such that his name was being linked with a number of Premier League clubs by 1997, although he would ultimately remain at Carrow Road for three more years.

He missed the start of the 1999–2000 season through a knee injury, and in December 1999, as a result of Norwich's financial problems and risk of relegation, he was sold to Leicester City for almost £3 million, finally giving him the chance to establish himself as a Premier League player.

Recurrent knee injuries restricted Eadie to only 40 league matches for Leicester, and he retired in the summer of 2003 at the age of 28. He was cup-tied for their victory in the 2000 Football League Cup Final.

== International career ==
Between 1994 and 1997, Eadie made seven appearances for the England U21 team, scoring two goals.

In the summer of 1997, Eadie was called up in the England squad for the Tournoi de France.

== Managerial career ==
In March 2020 Eadie was appointed joint manager of Leiston alongside Chris Wigger.

== Personal life ==
In 2002, Eadie was voted an inaugural member of the Norwich City Hall of Fame, which was established to celebrate the club's centenary. In an interview for the Norwich City matchday programme on 13 August 2005, Eadie stated that he had found retirement difficult, particularly as many of his friends were still playing professional football. It was reported in July 2012 that he had fought severe depression and suffered panic attacks.

== Honours ==
Individual

- First Division PFA Team of the Year: 1996–97
