= Mike Milligan (footballer) =

Footballer (born 1967)

Personal information
- Date of birth: 20 February 1967 (age 59)
- Place of birth: Manchester, England
- Height: 5 ft 8 in (1.73 m)
- Position: Midfielder

Youth career
- Oldham Athletic

Senior career*
Years	Team	Apps	(Gls)
1985–1990	Oldham Athletic	162	(17)
1990–1991	Everton	17	(1)
1991–1994	Oldham Athletic	117	(6)
1994–2000	Norwich City	124	(5)
2000–2002	Blackpool	28	(1)
Total		448	(30)

International career
1986	Republic of Ireland U21	1	(0)
1989	Republic of Ireland U23	1	(0)
1990	Republic of Ireland B	2	(0)
1992	Republic of Ireland	1	(0)
- * Club domestic league appearances and goals

Michael Milligan (born 20 February 1967) is a football coach and former professional player.

He left school in 1983 and signed for Oldham Athletic, establishing himself as a regular midfielder in the later part of the 1980s and helping them reach the FA Cup semi-final and Football League Cup final (which they lost to Nottingham Forest) in the 1989–90. After the end of the season, he signed for Everton in a £1 million deal, but the move was not a success and after just one season at Goodison Park, Joe Royle bought him back to Oldham, who had just returned to the top flight after a 68-year exile.

Milligan resumed his key role in the Oldham side that survived three seasons in the top flight (Premier League from 1992), helping them reach another FA Cup semi final in 1994, before leaving to join Norwich City after Oldham's relegation from the Premier League. He remained at Carrow Road until 2000, when he signed for Blackpool. At Bloomfield Road, he helped Steve McMahon's side win the Division Three playoffs and survive in Division Two before finally retiring in the summer of 2002, aged 35, after a career spanning 19 years.

Born in England, he played once for the Republic of Ireland in 1992, once for the Republic of Ireland U21 and twice for the Republic of Ireland B.

== Club career ==
After beginning his playing career in Oldham Athletic's youth team on leaving school in 1983, he turned professional in the 1984–85 season and made his debut the season after, before becoming a first team regular by the time of his 20th birthday in February 1987. He helped the Latics reach the Football League Cup final in 1989–90, where they lost 1–0 to Nottingham Forest, as well as reaching the FA Cup semi finals where they held Manchester United to a 3–3 draw before losing the replay 2–1.

However, the Latics were still in the Second Division in 1990 despite having looked like promotion contenders more than once since Milligan's debut five years earlier. When Everton manager Colin Harvey made a £1million bid for him, he accepted the offer and headed to Goodison Park on 24 August 1990. Unfortunately, his time at Everton was not a success as the Toffees endured a terrible start to the season and Harvey was replaced by Howard Kendall as manager in early November 1990. Everton's form improved and they climbed from 18th in early November to ninth in the final table, as well as reaching the FA Cup quarter-finals and eliminating neighbours Liverpool on the way, but Milligan failed to perform well on the pitch and made 17 appearances, scoring once, during a frustrating league campaign.

Meanwhile, Joe Royle had guided Oldham to the Second Division title and ended their 68-year absence from the First Division in 1990–91, and he secured Milligan's return to Boundary Park on 17 July 1991 for a club record fee of £600,000.

Milligan carried on where he had left off on his return to Oldham, being a key part of their midfield as they survived three seasons in the top flight and reached an FA Cup semi-final in the 1993–94 season, only being denied a Wembley final appearance when a Mark Hughes equaliser for Manchester United held them to a 1–1 draw in the first game before they were finally crushed 4–1 in the Maine Road replay.

Oldham went down from the Premier League at the end of the 1993–94 season and Milligan was determined to remain at the top level. His wish was granted on 27 June 1994 when he signed for Norwich City in an £800,000 deal.

Milligan had a fine start to his career at Carrow Road, as Norwich entered the Christmas period just outside the top five and with ambitions of a UEFA Cup place. But they suddenly went into freefall, won only one of their final 20 league games, and plummeted to 20th place and relegation. Manager John Deehan resigned a month before relegation was confirmed, replaced on a caretaker basis by Gary Megson until the job went to Martin O'Neill after the season's end. O'Neill left in December 1995 to take over at Leicester City, with Gary Megson returning for a second brief spell at the helm as the Canaries finished 16th after some early promise.

Mike Walker was Norwich's manager from the start of the 1996–97 season, and like the previous managers selected Milligan as a regular in central midfield. However, Walker had gone within two years and new manager Bruce Rioch gave Milligan fewer first team chances, as he appeared just twice in the 1998–99 season and 11 times in 1999–2000. He finally left Norwich in May 2000 after six years with the club, and signed for Blackpool on a free transfer after their relegation to the Third Division.

In Milligan's first season at Bloomfield Road, he helped them secure qualification for the Division Three playoffs and they won the final to secure an immediate return to Division Two. After contributing to their survival in the 2001–02 season, he retired from playing to call time on a career which had spanned nearly 20 years. At Blackpool he scored once, in a 6–0 win over Scunthorpe United.

== International career ==
Milligan had been capped once by the Republic of Ireland at full level (by Jack Charlton in 1992), having made a solitary appearance as an U-21 in 1986 and two as a "B" international in 1990 and 1994.

== Coaching career ==
Milligan had a two-year spells as head of player recruitment at Yeovil Town.

== Career statistics ==
Appearances and goals by club, season and competition
Club	Season	League			FA Cup		League Cup		Total
Club	Season	Division	Apps	Goals	Apps	Goals	Apps	Goals	Apps
Oldham Athletic	1985–90	162	17	12	1	20	1	194	19
Everton	1990–91	17	1	1	0	1	0	19	1
Oldham Athletic	1991–94	117	6	9	0	11	1	137	7
Norwich City	1994–2000	124	5	6	0	12	0	142	5
Blackpool	2000–02	28	1	0	0	1	0	29	1
Career total		448	30	38	1	45	2	521	33

== Honours ==
Oldham Athletic

- Football League Cup runner-up: 1989–90

Everton

- Full Members' Cup runner-up: 1990–91

Blackpool

- Football League Third Division play-offs: 2001

== See also ==
- List of Republic of Ireland international footballers born outside the Republic of Ireland
