= Daryl Sutch =

English footballer

Personal information
- Date of birth: 11 September 1971 (age 55)
- Place of birth: Lowestoft, England
- Height: 5 ft 11 in (1.80 m)
- Position: Defender

Senior career*
Years	Team	Apps	(Gls)
1990–2003	Norwich City	302	(9)
2003	Southend United	16	(1)
2003–2004	Boston United	6	(0)
Total		322	(10)

International career
1992–1993	England U21	4	(0)
- * Club domestic league appearances and goals

Daryl Sutch (born 11 September 1971) is an English former professional footballer who played as a defender

He spent the majority of his career with Norwich City, where he made 302 league appearances for the club with several seasons being spent in the Premier League. He also played in the UEFA Cup for the Canaries. He also briefly played in the Football League with Southend United before retiring following a period with Boston United.

== Playing career ==
Sutch came through the youth system at Norwich and made his first team debut in October 1990 at Carrow Road in a League Cup match against Watford. Sutch began his career as a midfielder, however as his career went on he played in defence and was a full-back for his last few seasons with Norwich. His last appearance for the club came at the end of the 2001–02 season, when he came on as a substitute in the Division One play-off final against Birmingham City at Cardiff's Millennium Stadium. City lost the match on penalties and Sutch, along with Philip Mulryne, was one of the two Norwich players who missed their spot-kicks. The start of the following season saw Sutch out of the first team picture and his contract was terminated by manager Nigel Worthington in January 2003.

After leaving Norwich, Sutch played briefly for Southend United, scoring once against Hartlepool, and Boston United. After being released by those clubs, he played for a series of local sides in Norfolk.

== Personal life ==
Sutch is a member of the Norwich City F.C. Hall of Fame and was awarded a testimonial match against AZ Alkmaar by the club in 1999. By 2013, he was working as an estate agent in Norwich.
