= 1999–2000 Norwich City F.C. season =

Norwich City
1999–2000 season
- Chairman: Bob Cooper
- Manager: Bruce Rioch (until 13 March); Bryan Hamilton (from 5 April)
- Stadium: Carrow Road
- First Division: 12th
- FA Cup: Third round
- Worthington Cup: Second round
- Top goalscorer: League: Iwan Roberts (17); All: Iwan Roberts (19)
- Highest home attendance: 19,948 (vs. Ipswich Town, 21 November 1999)
- Lowest home attendance: 12,468 (vs. Bolton Wanderers, 24 October 1999)
- Average home league attendance: 15,539
Home colours	Away colours

During the 1999–2000 English football season, Norwich City competed in the Football League First Division.

== Season summary ==
Manager Bruce Rioch resigned in March after failing to take Norwich anywhere near a place high enough to qualify for promotion to the Premier League. He was replaced by former Northern Ireland manager (and player for Norwich's arch-rivals Ipswich Town) Bryan Hamilton.

At the end of the season, top-scorer Iwan Roberts was named the club's player of the year. It was the second consecutive season the Welsh striker had won the award.

== Kit ==
Norwich signed a two-year kit manufacturing deal with Alexandra. Norfolk-based mustard maker Colman's remained the kit sponsors.

== Final league table ==
Pos	Team	Pld	W	D	L	GF	GA	GD	Pts
10	Queens Park Rangers	46	16	18	12	62	53	+9	66
11	Blackburn Rovers	46	15	17	14	55	51	+4	62
12	Norwich City	46	14	15	17	45	50	−5	57
13	Tranmere Rovers	46	15	12	19	57	68	−11	57
14	Nottingham Forest	46	14	14	18	53	55	−2	56

Rules for classification: 1) Points; 2) Goal difference; 3) Goals scored

== Results ==
Norwich City's score comes first

=== Legend ===
Win	Draw	Loss

=== Football League First Division ===
Date	Opponent	Venue	Result	Attendance	Scorers
11 August 1999	West Bromwich Albion	A	1–1	16,196	Dalglish
14 August 1999	Birmingham City	H	0–1	15,261	
21 August 1999	Charlton Athletic	A	0–1	19,623	
28 August 1999	Blackburn Rovers	H	0–2	15,407	
30 August 1999	Walsall	A	2–2	6,187	Marshall, Coote
11 September 1999	Crewe Alexandra	H	2–1	13,172	Roberts, Eadie
18 September 1999	Huddersfield Town	A	0–1	12,823	
26 September 1999	Stockport County	A	2–2	7,603	Roberts, Dalglish
28 September 1999	Manchester City	H	1–0	15,130	Roberts
2 October 1999	Fulham	H	1–2	16,332	Forbes
16 October 1999	Port Vale	A	1–0	5,790	Fleming
19 October 1999	Sheffield United	A	0–0	11,907	
24 October 1999	Bolton Wanderers	H	2–1	12,468	Russell (2)
26 October 1999	Stockport County	H	2–0	16,880	Flynn (own goal), Roberts
30 October 1999	Fulham	A	1–1	13,552	Roberts
6 November 1999	Nottingham Forest	H	1–0	15,818	Sutch
12 November 1999	Swindon Town	A	0–0	7,405	
21 November 1999	Ipswich Town	H	0–0	19,948	
23 November 1999	Crystal Palace	A	0–1	12,110	
28 November 1999	Grimsby Town	A	1–2	5,333	Kenton
4 December 1999	West Bromwich Albion	H	2–1	15,183	Roberts, Russell
17 December 1999	Tranmere Rovers	A	2–1	5,863	Roberts (2)
26 December 1999	Queens Park Rangers	H	2–1	17,823	Breacker (own goal), Llewellyn
28 December 1999	Wolverhampton Wanderers	A	0–1	25,072	
3 January 2000	Portsmouth	H	2–1	16,637	Fleming, Roberts (pen)
8 January 2000	Barnsley	H	2–2	14,039	Roberts (2)
15 January 2000	Birmingham City	A	0–2	21,007	
22 January 2000	Charlton Athletic	H	0–3	15,642	
5 February 2000	Walsall	H	1–1	16,837	Llewellyn
12 February 2000	Manchester City	A	1–3	32,681	Roberts
19 February 2000	Grimsby Town	H	3–0	13,533	McDermott (own goal), Russell, Llewellyn
26 February 2000	Huddersfield Town	H	1–1	16,464	Roberts
29 February 2000	Blackburn Rovers	A	1–1	15,671	Sutch
4 March 2000	Crewe Alexandra	A	0–1	5,450	
8 March 2000	Nottingham Forest	A	1–1	15,640	Roberts
11 March 2000	Crystal Palace	H	0–1	15,064	
19 March 2000	Ipswich Town	A	2–0	21,760	Roberts (2)
22 March 2000	Swindon Town	H	0–2	13,662	
25 March 2000	Queens Park Rangers	A	2–2	11,918	Marshall (2)
1 April 2000	Tranmere Rovers	H	1–1	13,734	Marshall
8 April 2000	Portsmouth	A	1–2	14,003	Marshall
15 April 2000	Wolverhampton Wanderers	H	1–0	15,910	Roberts
22 April 2000	Port Vale	H	0–0	15,526	
24 April 2000	Barnsley	A	1–2	15,253	Bellamy
28 April 2000	Sheffield United	H	2–1	16,921	Fleming, Bellamy
7 May 2000	Bolton Wanderers	A	0–1	17,987	

=== FA Cup ===
Round	Date	Opponent	Venue	Result	Attendance	Goalscorers
R3	11 December 1999	Coventry City	H	1–3	15,702	Llewellyn

=== League Cup ===
Round	Date	Opponent	Venue	Result	Attendance	Goalscorers
R1 1st Leg	10 August 1999	Cheltenham Town	H	2–0	12,276	Roberts (2)
R1 2nd Leg	24 August 1999	Cheltenham Town	A	1–2 (won 3–2 on agg)	4,203	Marshall
R2 1st Leg	14 September 1999	Fulham	H	0–4	11,760	
R2 2nd Leg	21 September 1999	Fulham	A	0–2 (lost 0–6 on agg)	5,246	

== Players ==
=== First-team squad ===
Squad at end of season

Note: Flags indicate national team as defined under FIFA eligibility rules; some limited exceptions apply. Players may hold more than one non-FIFA nationality.

No.	Pos.	Nation	Player
1	GK	ENG	Andy Marshall
2	DF	ENG	Daryl Sutch
4	MF	ENG	Lee Marshall
5	DF	ENG	Craig Fleming
6	DF	ENG	Matt Jackson (captain)
7	MF	FRA	Cédric Anselin
8	FW	WAL	Craig Bellamy
9	FW	WAL	Iwan Roberts
10	MF	NIR	Phil Mulryne
11	MF	ENG	Des Hamilton (on loan from Newcastle United)
12	MF	ENG	Darel Russell
13	GK	ENG	Robert Green
14	FW	SCO	Paul Dalglish

No.	Pos.	Nation	Player
16	FW	NIR	Adrian Coote (Note: Coote was born in Belton with Browston, England, but also qualified to represent Northern Ireland internationally and represented them at U-21 level before making his international debut for Northern Ireland in 1999.)
17	MF	ENG	Adrian Forbes
18	MF	SCO	Garry Brady (on loan from Newcastle United)
19	DF	ENG	Darren Kenton
20	MF	WAL	Chris Llewellyn
21	DF	SCO	Malky Mackay
25	MF	FRA	Jean-Yves de Blasiis
26	MF	NED	Raymond de Waard
27	GK	ENG	Danny Gay
31	DF	NED	Fernando Derveld
32	FW	SUI	Gaetano Giallanza
33	FW	NIR	Paul McVeigh

=== Left club during season ===
Note: Flags indicate national team as defined under FIFA eligibility rules; some limited exceptions apply. Players may hold more than one non-FIFA nationality.

No.	Pos.	Nation	Player
3	DF	NOR	Erik Fuglestad (to Viking)
11	MF	ENG	Darren Eadie (to Leicester City)
15	MF	IRL	Shaun Carey (Note: Carey was born in Kettering, England, but also qualified to represent the Republic of Ireland internationally and represented them at U-21 level.) (to Rushden & Diamonds)
18	MF	SCO	Peter Grant (to Reading)
22	MF	IRL	Mike Milligan (Note: Milligan was born in Manchester, England, but also qualified to represent the Republic of Ireland internationally and represented them at U-21, U-23, and B level before making his international debut for the Republic of Ireland in 1992.) (to Blackpool)
23	DF	ENG	Che Wilson (to Bristol Rovers)

No.	Pos.	Nation	Player
24	MF	ENG	Darren Way (to Yeovil Town)
26	DF	SEN	Pape Seydou Diop (on loan from Lens)
28	MF	ENG	Ross Fitzsimon (released)
29	MF	ENG	Kevin Parker (released)
30	DF	ENG	Matthew Joynson (released)
