= 2000–01 Norwich City F.C. season =

Norwich City
2000–01 season
- Chairman: Bob Cooper
- Manager: Bryan Hamilton (until 4 December); Nigel Worthington (from 4 December)
- Stadium: Carrow Road
- Football League First Division: 15th
- FA Cup: Third round
- Worthington Cup: Third round
- Top goalscorer: League: Roberts (15); All: Roberts (19)
- Average home league attendance: 16,525
Home colours	Away colours

During the 2000–01 English football season, Norwich City F.C. competed in the Football League First Division.

== Season summary ==
Rioch's successor, Bryan Hamilton, lasted in the job for six months before he resigned with the club 20th in the First Division, and in real danger of relegation to the third tier of English football for the first time since the 1960s. The new appointee was Nigel Worthington, who had been Hamilton's assistant manager and he successfully steered the team away from the threat of relegation to finish mid-table.

== Final league table ==
Pos	Team	Pld	W	D	L	GF	GA	GD	Pts
13	Gillingham	46	13	16	17	61	66	−5	55
14	Crewe Alexandra	46	15	10	21	47	62	−15	55
15	Norwich City	46	14	12	20	46	58	−12	54
16	Barnsley	46	15	9	22	49	62	−13	54
17	Sheffield Wednesday	46	15	8	23	52	71	−19	53

Rules for classification: 1) Points; 2) Goal difference; 3) Goals scored

== Results ==
Norwich City's score comes first

=== Legend ===
Win	Draw	Loss

=== Football League First Division ===
Date	Opponent	Venue	Result	Attendance	Scorers
12 August 2000	Barnsley	A	0–1	15,640	
19 August 2000	Nottingham Forest	H	0–0	18,059	
26 August 2000	Blackburn Rovers	A	2–3	19,542	Roberts, Giallanza
28 August 2000	Fulham	H	0–1	16,678	
9 September 2000	Crewe Alexandra	A	0–0	5,955	
12 September 2000	Stockport County	A	3–1	5,703	Whitley, Roberts (2, 1 pen)
16 September 2000	Crystal Palace	H	0–0	16,828	
24 September 2000	Wolverhampton Wanderers	A	0–4	15,105	
30 September 2000	Huddersfield Town	H	1–1	14,499	Giallanza
14 October 2000	West Bromwich Albion	A	3–2	16,511	Derveld, Llewellyn, Kenton
17 October 2000	Preston North End	A	0–1	13,002	
21 October 2000	Sheffield United	H	4–2	15,504	Mulryne, Roberts, Cottee, Llewellyn
24 October 2000	Portsmouth	H	0–0	18,772	
4 November 2000	Tranmere Rovers	H	1–0	13,688	Roberts
7 November 2000	Birmingham City	H	1–0	13,900	Forbes
11 November 2000	Sheffield Wednesday	A	2–3	16,956	Parker, Marshall
18 November 2000	Bolton Wanderers	H	0–2	15,224	
21 November 2000	Burnley	A	0–2	15,017	
25 November 2000	Wimbledon	H	1–2	14,059	Roberts
2 December 2000	Portsmouth	A	0–2	13,409	
9 December 2000	Gillingham	H	1–0	16,725	Llewellyn
16 December 2000	Grimsby Town	A	0–2	5,618	
23 December 2000	Barnsley	H	0–0	16,581	
26 December 2000	Queens Park Rangers	A	3–2	12,338	Roberts (2), Marshall
30 December 2000	Nottingham Forest	A	0–0	20,108	
1 January 2001	Blackburn Rovers	H	1–1	16,695	Forbes
13 January 2001	Fulham	A	0–2	16,052	
20 January 2001	Queens Park Rangers	H	1–0	16,472	Abbey
27 January 2001	Watford	H	2–1	15,309	Nedergaard, Marshall
3 February 2001	Birmingham City	A	1–2	18,551	Llewellyn
10 February 2001	Crewe Alexandra	H	1–1	15,164	Llewellyn
17 February 2001	Crystal Palace	A	1–1	16,417	Harrison (own goal)
20 February 2001	Stockport County	H	4–0	19,768	Llewellyn, Roberts (3)
24 February 2001	Wolverhampton Wanderers	H	1–0	17,288	McVeigh
3 March 2001	Huddersfield Town	A	0–2	11,122	
6 March 2001	West Bromwich Albion	H	0–1	16,372	
10 March 2001	Watford	A	1–4	15,123	Forbes
17 March 2001	Preston North End	H	1–2	16,282	Roberts
31 March 2001	Grimsby Town	H	2–1	17,461	Roberts, Llewellyn
7 April 2001	Gillingham	A	3–4	9,608	Llewellyn, Russell, Roberts
10 April 2001	Sheffield United	A	1–1	16,072	Kenton
14 April 2001	Tranmere Rovers	A	1–0	9,303	McGovern
16 April 2001	Burnley	H	2–3	17,507	Notman, Roberts (pen)
21 April 2001	Bolton Wanderers	A	0–1	17,967	
28 April 2001	Sheffield Wednesday	H	1–0	21,241	Mackay
6 May 2001	Wimbledon	A	0–0	7,888	

=== FA Cup ===
Round	Date	Opponent	Venue	Result	Attendance	Goalscorers
R3	6 January 2001	Sheffield Wednesday	A	1–2	15,971	Roberts

=== League Cup ===
Round	Date	Opponent	Venue	Result	Attendance	Goalscorers
R1 1st Leg	26 August 2000	Bournemouth	H	0–0	12,224	
R1 2nd Leg	5 September 2000	Bournemouth	A	2–1 (won 2–1 on agg)	3,634	Giallanza, Russell
R2 1st Leg	19 September 2000	Blackpool	H	3–3	9,369	Roberts (pen), Marshall, Cottee
R2 2nd Leg	2 October 2000	Blackpool	A	5–0 (won 8–3 on agg)	4,038	Russell, Giallanza (2), Roberts (2)
R3	1 November 2000	Derby County	A	0–3	11,273	

== Players ==
=== First-team squad ===
Squad at end of season

Note: Flags indicate national team as defined under FIFA eligibility rules; some limited exceptions apply. Players may hold more than one non-FIFA nationality.

No.	Pos.	Nation	Player
1	GK	ENG	Andy Marshall
2	DF	ENG	Daryl Sutch
3	DF	NED	Fernando Derveld
4	DF	ENG	Adam Drury
5	DF	ENG	Craig Fleming
6	DF	ENG	Matt Jackson
7	MF	FRA	Cédric Anselin
8	FW	SCO	Alex Notman
9	FW	WAL	Iwan Roberts
10	MF	NIR	Phil Mulryne
11	MF	SCO	Gary Holt
12	MF	ENG	Darel Russell
13	GK	ENG	Robert Green
14	FW	SCO	Paul Dalglish
15	MF	FRA	Jean-Yves de Blasiis
16	FW	NIR	Adrian Coote (Note: Coote was born in Belton with Browston, England, but also qualified to represent Northern Ireland internationally and represented them at U-21 level before making his international debut for Northern Ireland in 1999.)

No.	Pos.	Nation	Player
17	MF	ENG	Adrian Forbes
18	FW	SUI	Gaetano Giallanza
19	MF	ENG	Darren Kenton
20	MF	WAL	Chris Llewellyn
21	DF	SCO	Malky Mackay
22	FW	NIR	Paul McVeigh
23	DF	DEN	Steen Nedergaard
24	DF	IRL	Brian McGovern
25	MF	ENG	Lewis Blois
26	FW	ENG	Danny Bloomfield
27	GK	ENG	Danny Gay
28	MF	ENG	Matthew Parry
29	MF	ENG	Andrew Oxby
31	FW	CAN	Paul Peschisolido (on loan from Fulham)
32	FW	ENG	Zema Abbey

=== Left club during season ===
Note: Flags indicate national team as defined under FIFA eligibility rules; some limited exceptions apply. Players may hold more than one non-FIFA nationality.

No.	Pos.	Nation	Player
4	MF	ENG	Lee Marshall (to Leicester City)
8	FW	WAL	Craig Bellamy (to Coventry City)
8	FW	ENG	Tony Cottee (to Barnet)
11	MF	NED	Raymond de Waard (retired)
25	MF	NIR	Jim Whitley (Note: Whitley was born in Ndola, Zambia, but also qualified to represent Northern Ireland internationally through his father and made his international debut for Northern Ireland in June 1998.) (on loan from Manchester City)

No.	Pos.	Nation	Player
25	MF	ENG	Scott Parker (on loan from Charlton Athletic)
26	MF	SCO	Garry Brady (on loan from Newcastle United)
30	DF	ENG	Steve Walsh (retired)
31	DF	ENG	Danny Granville (on loan from Manchester City)
