= Darel Russell =

English footballer (born 1980)

Personal information
- Full name: Darel Francis Roy G. Russell
- Date of birth: 22 October 1980 (age 46)
- Place of birth: Mile End, England
- Position: Midfielder

Youth career
- 1993–1996: Norwich City

Senior career*
Years	Team	Apps	(Gls)
1997–2003	Norwich City	132	(6)
2003–2007	Stoke City	171	(16)
2007–2010	Norwich City	112	(10)
2010–2012	Preston North End	27	(0)
2011–2012	→ Charlton Athletic (loan)	11	(2)
2012–2013	Portsmouth	17	(0)
2013	Toronto FC	18	(3)
2014	Tampa Bay Rowdies	25	(3)
Total		513	(40)
- * Club domestic league appearances and goals

Darel Francis Roy G. Russell (born 22 October 1980) is an English former professional footballer who played as a midfielder.

Russell began his career with Norwich City in 1997 and played 147 times for the Canaries before joining Stoke City in 2003. He was a regular starter under Tony Pulis at Stoke, spending four seasons in the Potteries playing over 180 times. Russell returned to Norwich in July 2007 where he helped them win the League One title in 2009–10. He went on to play for Preston North End, Charlton Athletic, Portsmouth and in North America with Toronto FC and Tampa Bay Rowdies.

== Career ==
=== Norwich City ===
Born in Mile End, Russell began his career as a youth player at Norwich City making his debut on the last day of the 1997–98 season in a 1–0 victory against Reading. He made 13 appearances in 1998–99 before establishing himself in the first team in 1999–2000. In April 2000, Norwich manager Bruce Rioch was replaced by Bryan Hamilton whose old school style of management made it a tough environment for Russell to develop. Hamilton was sacked in December 2000 with the side in relegation trouble, he was replaced by Nigel Worthington who guided them to a safe position of 15th with Russell making 47 appearances in 2000–01. At the end of the season Russell was linked with a move to East Anglia rivals Ipswich Town. He made 26 appearances in 2001–02 as Norwich reached the 2002 Football League First Division play-off final where they lost on penalties to Birmingham City. Russell missed two months of the 2002–03 campaign after breaking a bone in his foot. In June 2003 Russell rejected a new contract offer from Norwich.

=== Stoke City ===
Russell joined Stoke in 2003 for a fee of £125,000 in August 2003. He made his Stoke debut on 9 August 2003 in a 3–0 win away at Derby County. Russell scored twice in a 3–1 win against Sunderland on 16 September 2003. Russell was an ever-present under Tony Pulis in 2003–04 playing 50 times as the team finished in 11th position. He scored on the opening day of the 2004–05 season in a 2–1 win over promotion favorites Wolverhampton Wanderers. Russell missed only one match in 2004–05 as Stoke were unable to mount a promotion challenge finishing in 12th. He made 39 appearances in 2005–06 as Stoke finished in 13th place under Dutch manager Johan Boskamp. Pulis returned to the club in 2006–07 and several new signings enabled them to push for a play-off spot. Russell won the Championship player of the month award for November 2006. Russell scored a career best of seven goals in 2006–07 as Stoke narrowly missed out on a play-off place by two points.

=== Return to Norwich ===
On 30 July 2007, Russell rejoined the Canaries for an undisclosed fee (reported to be around the £410,000 marked down from £600,000 due to a 30% sell-on clause the canaries had in the deal taking Russell to Stoke in 2003), on a three-year contract. Russell played 44 times in 2007–08 as the Canaries finished in 17th spot. Under the management of Glenn Roeder in 2008–09, Russell was played out of position as a forward which did not go down well with Norwich supporters. Roeder was sacked in January 2009 and replaced by Bryan Gunn but he was unable to prevent Norwich being relegated to League One.

In the summer of 2009 Norwich rejected a bid of £500,000 from Premier League newcomers Burnley. He remained at Carrow Road and helped the side gain an instant return to the Championship in 2009–10 winning the League One title with a club record 95 points. On 1 July 2010, it was confirmed that Russell had rejected the offer from Norwich of a new contract, and he was released.

=== Preston North End ===
Russell signed for Preston North End on a three-year deal on 4 August 2010. He scored his first and what turned out to be only goal for Preston in the League Cup against Charlton Athletic on 13 September 2011. His time at Deepdale was unsuccessful as Preston were relegated to League One in 2010–11. He was transfer listed by the club in May 2012.

==== Charlton Athletic (loan) ====
On 24 November 2011 Russell signed on loan for League One rivals Charlton Athletic until January 2012. On 7 January 2012 this loan was extended until the end of the season. He played 11 times in 2011–12, scoring twice helping the Addicks win the League One title.

=== Portsmouth ===
On summer transfer deadline day 2012, Russell joined Portsmouth on an initial one-month deal. Russell left Portsmouth on 28 January 2013, a day before his contract with the club was due to expire. He had made 18 appearances for Pompey with the side destined for relegation after suffering a ten-point deduction.

=== Toronto FC ===
On 14 February, Russell joined Canadian Major League Soccer side Toronto FC on a trial basis. On 1 March, he signed a contract with the Canadian club. He made his debut for the club on 9 March in a 2–1 home victory over Sporting Kansas City, he came on as a second half sub for John Bostock. Russell scored his first goal for the club on 6 April, the goal came in the 90th minute to earn Toronto a 2–2 home draw against FC Dallas. He was not retained following the 2013 season.

=== Tampa Bay Rowdies ===
Russell joined Tampa Bay Rowdies for the 2014 North American Soccer League season. He played 26 times, scoring three goals as the team failed to reach the championship play-offs. He retired at the end of the season.

== Personal life ==
Russel was born in England and is of Saint Lucian descent. His sister Shar Alexander (real name Sharlene Russell), is a singer in the band 'Miss Frank' who competed in the sixth series of X Factor.

== Career statistics ==
Appearances and goals by club, season and competition
Club	Season	League			FA Cup		League Cup		Other		Total	
Club	Season	Division	Apps	Goals	Apps	Goals	Apps	Goals	Apps	Goals	Apps	Goals
Norwich City	1997–98	First Division	1	0	0	0	0	0	—		1	0
Norwich City	1998–99	First Division	13	1	0	0	0	0	—		13	1
Norwich City	1999–2000	First Division	33	4	1	0	2	0	—		36	4
Norwich City	2000–01	First Division	41	1	1	0	5	2	—		47	3
Norwich City	2001–02	First Division	23	0	2	0	1	0	0	0	26	0
Norwich City	2002–03	First Division	21	0	3	0	0	0	—		24	0
Norwich City	Total		132	6	7	0	8	2	0	0	147	8
Stoke City	2003–04	First Division	46	4	2	0	2	0	—		50	4
Stoke City	2004–05	Championship	45	2	1	0	1	0	—		47	2
Stoke City	2005–06	Championship	37	3	1	0	1	0	—		39	3
Stoke City	2006–07	Championship	43	7	2	0	1	0	—		46	7
Stoke City	Total		171	16	6	0	5	0	0	0	182	16
Norwich City	2007–08	Championship	39	4	2	0	3	1	—		44	5
Norwich City	2008–09	Championship	38	4	2	0	1	0	—		41	4
Norwich City	2009–10	League One	35	2	2	0	0	0	2 (Note: Appearances in Football League Trophy)	0	39	2
Norwich City	Total		112	10	6	0	4	1	2	0	124	11
Preston North End	2010–11	Championship	25	0	1	0	2	0	—		28	0
Preston North End	2011–12	League One	2	0	0	0	2	1	0	0	4	1
Preston North End	Total		27	0	1	0	4	1	0	0	32	1
Charlton Athletic (loan)	2011–12	League One	11	2	0	0	0	0	0	0	11	2
Portsmouth	2012–13	League One	17	0	0	0	0	0	1	0	18	0
Toronto FC	2013	Major League Soccer	18	3	0	0	0	0	0	0	18	3
Tampa Bay Rowdies	2014	NASL	25	3	1	0	0	0	0	0	26	3
Career total			513	40	21	0	21	4	3	0	558	44

== Honours ==
Norwich City

- Football League One: 2009–10
