= Robert Green =

English footballer (born 1980)

Rob Green
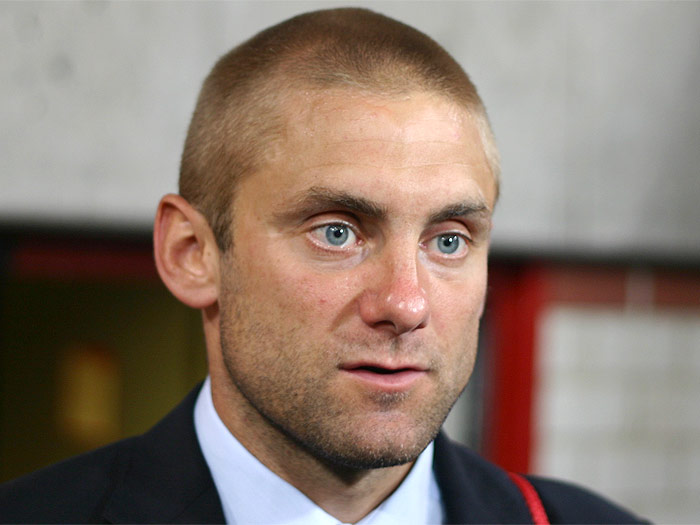
- Green in 2010

Personal information
- Full name: Robert Paul Green
- Date of birth: 18 January 1980 (age 46)
- Place of birth: Chertsey, Surrey, England
- Height: 6 ft 2 in (1.87 m)
- Position: Goalkeeper

Youth career
- 1992–1999: Norwich City

Senior career*
| Years | Team | Apps | (Gls) |
| 1999–2006 | Norwich City | 223 | (0) |
| 2006–2012 | West Ham United | 219 | (0) |
| 2012–2016 | Queens Park Rangers | 121 | (0) |
| 2016–2017 | Leeds United | 46 | (0) |
| 2017–2018 | Huddersfield Town | 0 | (0) |
| 2018–2019 | Chelsea | 0 | (0) |
| Total | | 609 | (0) |

International career
| 1997 | England U16 | 1 | (0) |
| 1998 | England U18 | 2 | (0) |
| 2006 | England B | 1 | (0) |
| 2005–2012 | England | 12 | (0) |
- * Club domestic league appearances and goals

Robert Paul Green (born 18 January 1980) is an English former professional footballer who played as a goalkeeper. He played in the Premier League and Football League and for the England national team.

Green made his first-team debut for Norwich City in 1999 and totalled 241 appearances across all competitions for them, making the PFA Team of the Year when they won the First Division in 2003–04. In 2006, he transferred to West Ham United, making the same number of appearances in a six-year spell in which he was their Player of the Year in 2008 and won promotion via the Championship play-offs in 2012. He then moved on a free transfer to Queens Park Rangers, winning the play-offs again in 2014. In July 2016, Green joined Leeds United on a one-year contract. He later joined Huddersfield Town and Chelsea for one year each before retiring in 2019.

Green represented England at under-16, under-18 and B level. He made his debut for the full England squad in 2005. Green was cut from England's 2006 FIFA World Cup squad due to injury but featured in the 2010 edition. He was also in their squad for UEFA Euro 2012.

== Club career ==
=== Norwich City ===
Born in Chertsey, Surrey, Green came through the youth system at Norwich City. He made his first-team debut in the First Division on 11 April 1999, keeping a clean sheet in the 0–0 East Anglia derby draw against rivals Ipswich Town at Carrow Road. The first-choice goalkeeper since 1997-1998 remained Andy Marshall — on Marshall's departure in the summer of 2001 Green was able to establish himself as first choice goalkeeper for Norwich.

He was a star of the 2001–02 season play-off campaign which culminated in a final loss to Birmingham City on penalties.

By 2003, Green was a key figure in the Norwich team. He played a key role in helping Norwich into the First Division championship in 2003–04 and promotion into the Premier League. The Norwich number one was once again ever present, keeping another 18 clean sheets and conceding just 39 goals in 46 league appearances. Green put in many match winning performances during the season. These man of the match displays included home fixtures with Derby County and Stoke City; he pulled off a save from Gerry Taggart during the latter. Performances of this high standard led to his first England international call up for the friendly in March 2004 versus Sweden. He was also included in the PFA Team of the Year for the season.

Norwich were relegated into the Championship the following season. Green kept just 6 clean sheets and conceded 77 goals during the Premier League season despite many excellent individual performances. England coach Sven-Göran Eriksson continually picked Green for international squads on merit.

After relegation Norwich struggled to adjust back to Championship football. It proved to be Green's worst season as Norwich's number one, keeping just seven clean sheets in 42 league appearances. Green missed the last few matches of 2005–06 after he sustained an injury in the warm-up prior to the away fixture against Sheffield Wednesday. In August 2006, Norwich accepted a bid of up to £2 million from West Ham United for Green.

=== West Ham United ===
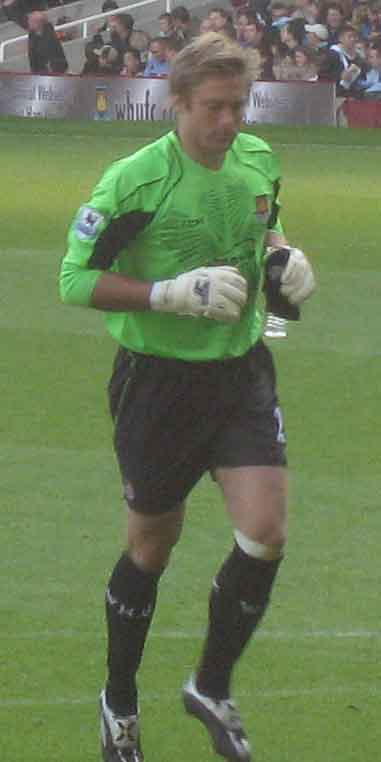
Green playing for West Ham United in 2006

Green signed a four-year deal with West Ham United, where he teamed up with former Norwich striker, Dean Ashton who had been sold to West Ham in January 2006. Green made his debut for West Ham on 19 October 2006 in a 1–0 defeat against Tottenham Hotspur at White Hart Lane. Two of his best performances were when West Ham won 1–0 against Arsenal at the Emirates Stadium and against Manchester United where he helped his team to a 1–0 win, which preserved West Ham's Premier League status. Green kept nine clean sheets in 26 appearances during the league season.

In 2007–08, Green saved the first three penalties taken against him. The first, against Kevin Doyle of Reading, the second, Benjani of Portsmouth in injury time, and the third from Tottenham's Jermain Defoe, again in injury time. The streak was ended by James McFadden of Birmingham City on 9 February 2008. He played in every match and was named the West Ham Hammer of the Year with the team finishing in 10th place in the Premier League.

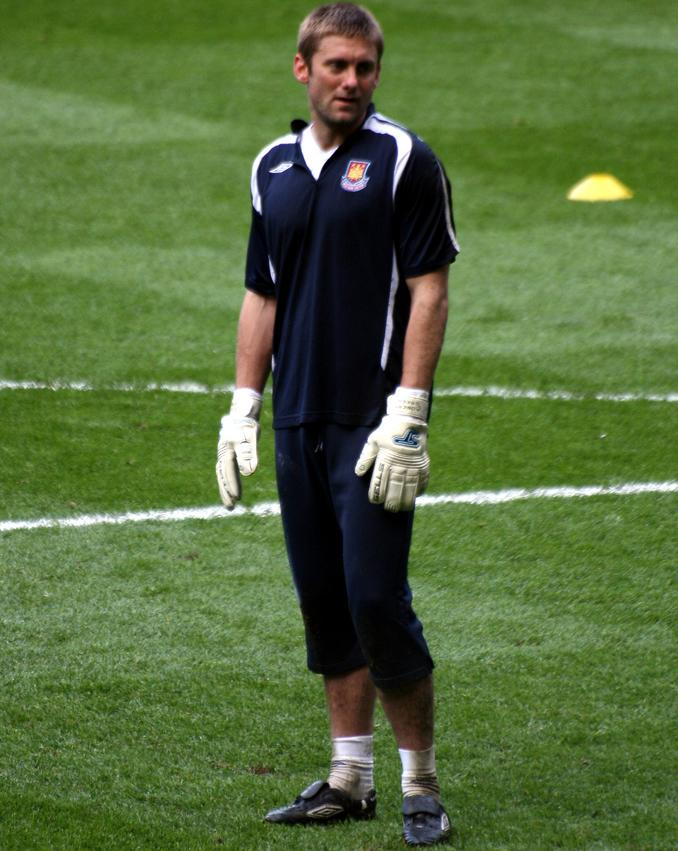
Green warming up for West Ham United in 2008

In 2008–09, Green saved yet another penalty, this time on 30 August 2008 against Jason Roberts of Blackburn Rovers, West Ham then went on to win the match 4–1. Green played all 38 league matches for West Ham in that season, keeping ten clean sheets. And again played in all 38 league matches for West Ham in 2009–10, keeping eight clean sheets and saving yet another penalty, this time from Aston Villa's Ashley Young in a 2–1 victory.

Green made 44 appearances in all competitions during 2010–11, keeping seven clean sheets. He saved a penalty in a 3–1 victory over Wigan Athletic at Upton Park and then again against Stoke City in a 2–1 FA Cup defeat. On 19 March 2011, Green made a world-class save against Gareth Bale's free kick in the 0–0 draw with Tottenham Hotspur at White Hart Lane. He was named Hammer of the Year as runner-up to Scott Parker.

Green was sent off for the first time in his club career against Blackpool on 21 February 2012. West Ham, who had not named a substitute goalkeeper in their squad for the match, were forced to play the remainder of the second-half with midfielder Henri Lansbury in goal. They eventually won 4–1. West Ham later won an appeal against the red card leaving Green available to play in their next match. He played 42 of West Ham's 46 match 2011–12 Championship season playing in the play-off final at Wembley Stadium which West Ham United won, sealing their immediate return into the Premier League. In June 2012, after West Ham and Green failed to agree new terms at the end of his contract, joint-chairman David Gold announced Green's departure from the club.

=== Queens Park Rangers ===
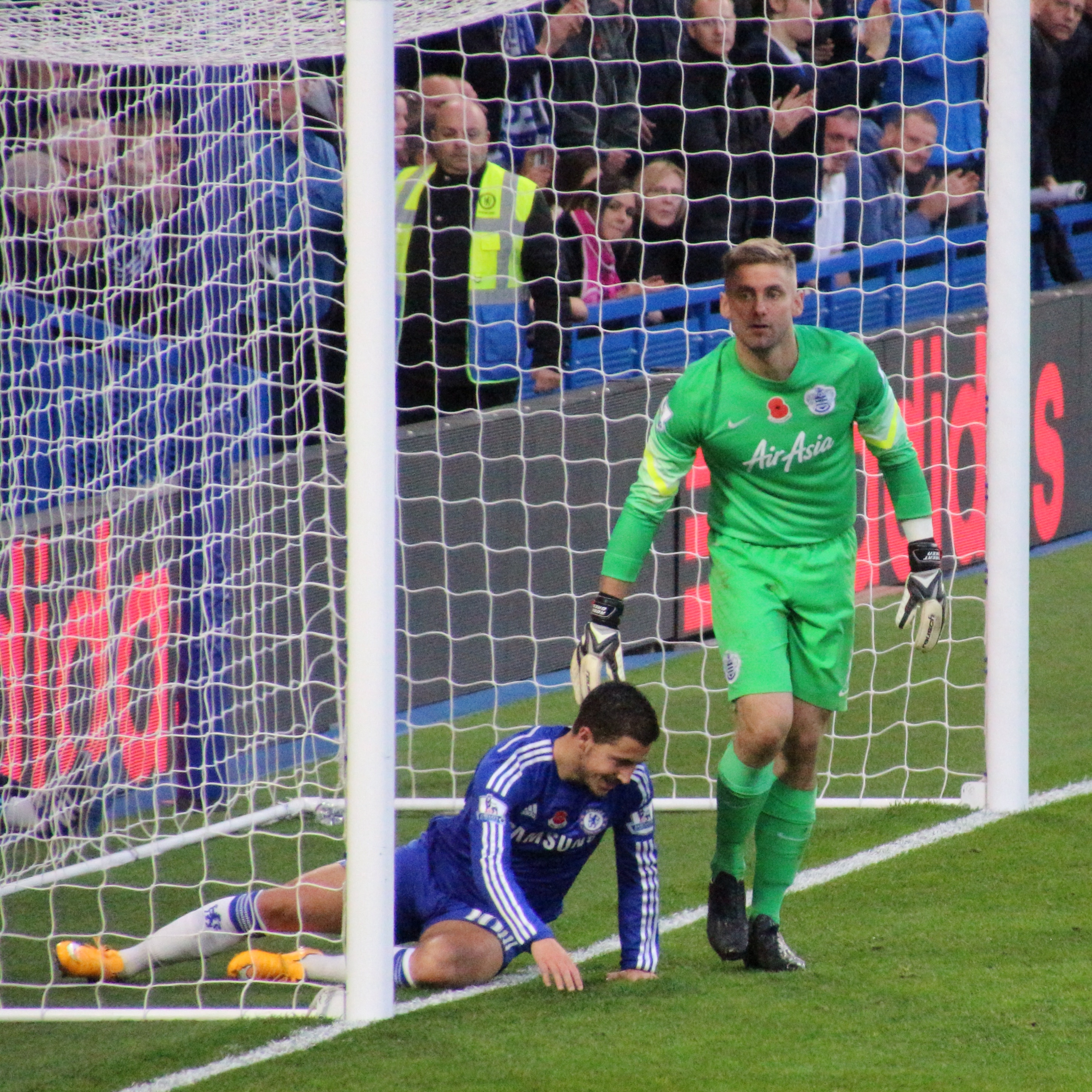
Green playing for Queens Park Rangers in 2014

Green agreed terms with Queens Park Rangers (QPR) on 21 June 2012, and joined on a free transfer on 1 July, on a two-year contract. He made his debut on 18 August 2012 in a 5–0 home defeat by Swansea City. Green played only two more matches for QPR before manager Mark Hughes signed Brazilian international Júlio César; although Green played the next match against Manchester City, this was only because Júlio César's work permit was not complete and the Brazilian started the following match, against Chelsea on 15 September 2012.

After the sacking of Hughes, new manager Harry Redknapp replaced Julio César with Green at half time during his first match in charge, against Sunderland on 27 November 2012. Green then went on to play the next five matches. before being once again relegated to the bench for most of the next 4 months, only starting three matches between 26 December and 20 April, two FA Cup matches in January then coming on when Júlio César was injured in the victory over Southampton and playing the following match as the Brazilian recovered. Redknapp said following Green's third successive start in the loss to Arsenal that for the remainder of the season he "want[s] to play Rob Green" and that Green "will probably be [his] goalkeeper next season", as he expected Júlio César to be sold over the summer. At the start of 2013–14, Green was named as first choice goalkeeper for the opening matches of the season. Green was a member of the QPR team that won the 2014 Championship play-off final, 1–0 against Derby County at Wembley Stadium on 24 May 2014.

After a single season back in the Premier League, QPR were relegated after a 6–0 away defeat to Manchester City on 10 May 2015, Green's fourth relegation from the Premier League. Earlier in the season, on 26 December, he saved an early penalty in an eventual 2–1 loss to Arsenal, as his teammate Eduardo Vargas pointed out which way fellow Chilean Alexis Sánchez was likely to shoot.

After starting 2015–16 as QPR's first choice goalkeeper, Green was frozen out the starting line-up one match after the arrival of new manager Jimmy Floyd Hasselbaink due to a clause in his contract triggering a contract extension if he played 30 Championship matches. With QPR wanting to reduce the wage bill, Green left the club upon the expiry of his contract at the end of 2015–16, after a move to Premier League club Crystal Palace fell through in the January transfer window.

=== Leeds United ===
On 6 July 2016, Green signed a one-year contract with Championship club Leeds United. On 7 August 2016, Green made his Leeds debut against QPR in a 3–0 defeat, in which he failed to punch a ball from a corner leading to a Sol Bamba own goal. Green was the match winner in the next match on 10 August 2016 in the League Cup against Fleetwood Town, when he saved a penalty from Fleetwood's Eggert Jónsson in a 5–4 penalty shoot-out victory after a 2–2 extra-time draw His first clean sheet came on 20 August 2016 in a 2–0 win against Sheffield Wednesday.

On 20 November 2016, Green committed a high-profile error when he dropped the ball under his crossbar onto the foot of Newcastle United striker Dwight Gayle to tap the ball home in a 2–0 defeat. On 17 December 2016, Green kept his 8th League clean sheet for Leeds, this equalled the tally already for Leeds' clean sheet for the whole of the previous 2015–16 season with goalkeeper predecessor Marco Silvestri.

After making his 600th league appearance, on 26 February 2017, Green saved a penalty from Sheffield Wednesday striker Jordan Rhodes in Leeds' 1–0 victory. After impressing during his first season at the club, on 18 March 2017, Green signed a new one-year contract at the club.

Green started the 2017–18 season under new head coach Thomas Christiansen as the club's second choice goalkeeper behind new signing Felix Wiedwald, and made his only appearance of the season on 22 August 2017 in Leeds' 5–1 League Cup victory against Newport County. After the signing of Andy Lonergan on 27 August 2017, Leeds reached a mutual termination the same day with Green to allow him to move to Premier League side Huddersfield Town.

=== Huddersfield Town ===
On 27 August 2017, Green signed for Premier League club Huddersfield Town on a contract until the end of 2017–18, after his contract with Leeds United was mutually terminated. Green failed to make a single first-team appearance for Huddersfield and in May 2018, the club announced that his contract would not be renewed.

=== Chelsea ===
Green signed for Premier League club Chelsea on 26 July 2018 on a one-year contract to provide cover for Thibaut Courtois (later sold and replaced by Kepa Arrizabalaga) and Willy Caballero. In March 2019 he spoke about being a third-choice goalkeeper, stating that "you don't get that same motivation" and "there is not the same commitment in a physical or mental sense".

Despite not even being on the bench for the 2019 UEFA Europa League final or any other Chelsea game during the season, Green celebrated by lifting the Europa League trophy after Chelsea beat Arsenal 4–1 on 29 May 2019.

On 31 May 2019, Green announced his retirement from playing.

== International career ==
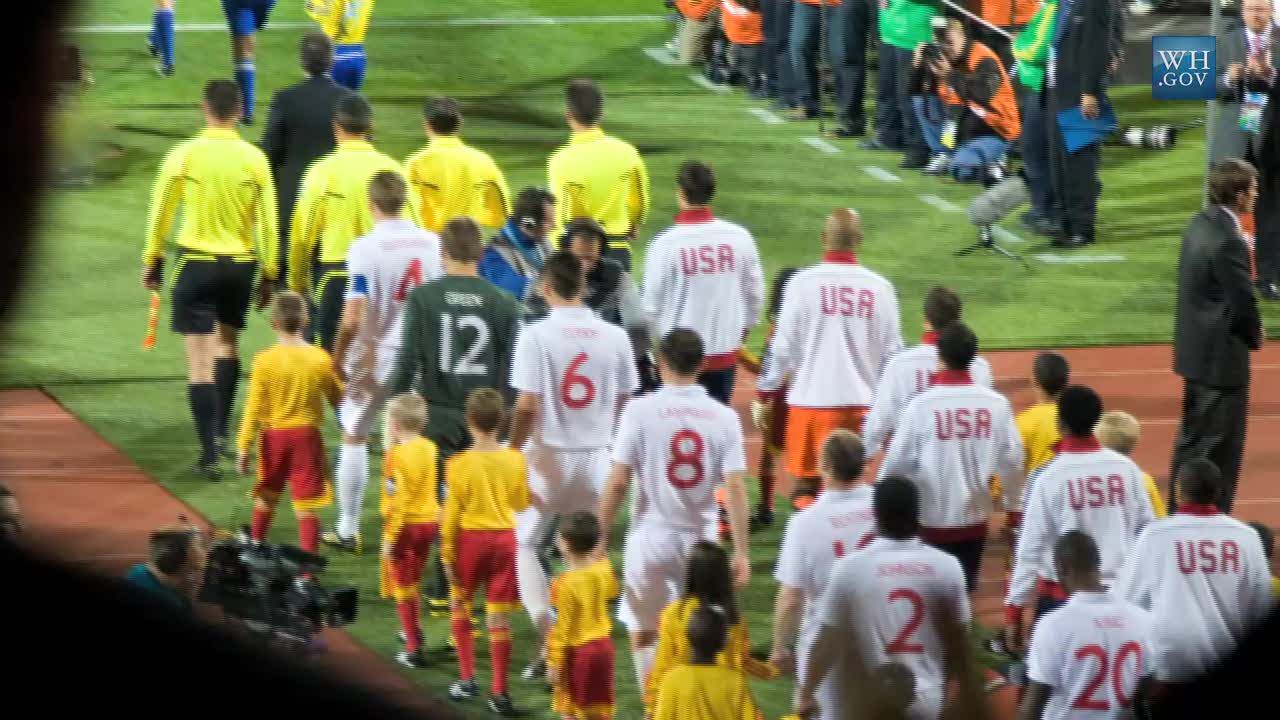
Green (wearing No. 12) enters the field with England before the 2010 FIFA World Cup match against the U.S.

Green earned his first call-up to the full England squad in 2004 while at Norwich. On 31 May 2005, he became the sixth Norwich player to wear the Three Lions shirt when he appeared as a half-time substitute for David James in a 3–2 friendly win against Colombia at Giants Stadium in the United States. Green remained in the England squad despite Norwich having been relegated into the Championship in 2005, and was selected for the England 2006 FIFA World Cup squad. However, he ruptured his groin whilst taking a goal kick during the England B international against Belarus on 25 May. He was replaced in the squad by Liverpool's Scott Carson. The injury not only meant that Green missed the World Cup but also the start of the 2006–07 season.

After a prolonged absence from the international scene, Green was called up for the England "B" match in May 2007 and then named in the senior England squad to face Brazil and Estonia in June 2007. He did not make Fabio Capello's first England team in February 2008. Green showed a sense of humour about the international situation, sporting gloves with 'England's No.6' embroidered on them. He was recalled to the squad in place of the injured Chris Kirkland for England's friendly with France on 26 March 2008. On 6 June 2009 Green made his first England start in their 4–0 win in Almaty against Kazakhstan in a 2010 FIFA World Cup qualifier. He played for England against Croatia on 9 September 2009 with England securing a place in South Africa with a 5–1 victory. On 10 October 2009, he became the first ever England goalkeeper to be sent off, during the penultimate match of qualification against Ukraine, for a professional foul on Artem Milevskyi early in the match. England went on to lose 1–0.

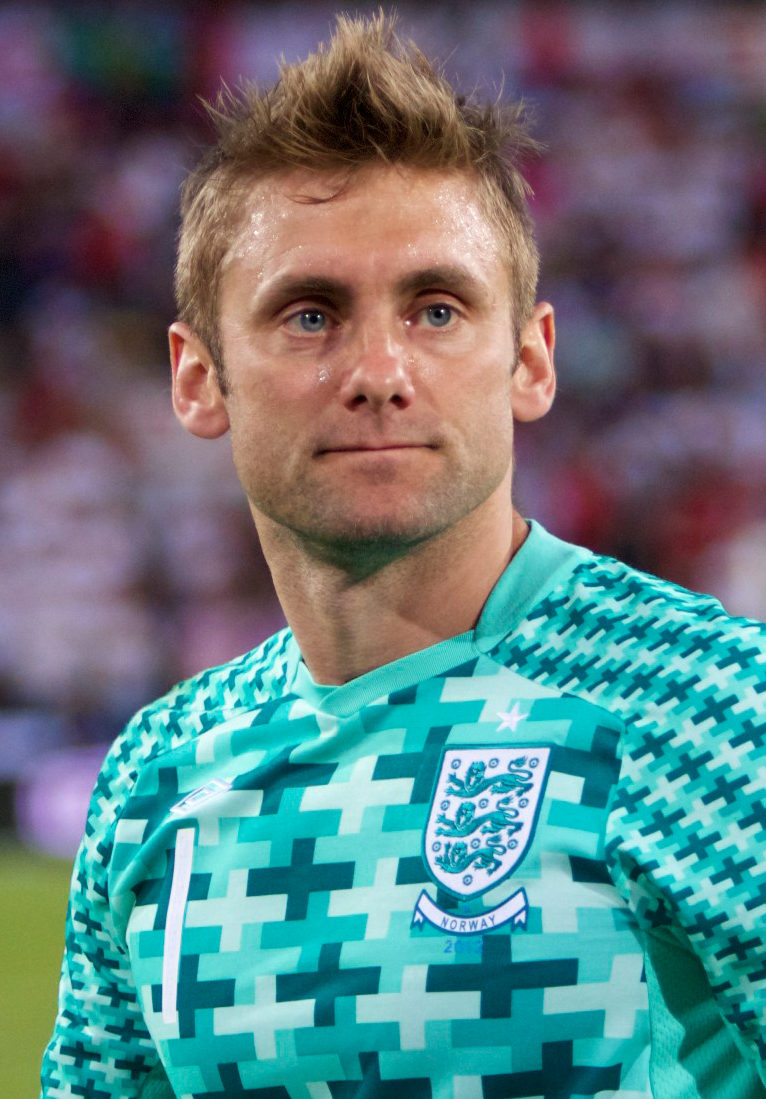
Green playing for England in 2012

Green was named in England's squad for the 2010 FIFA World Cup. Manager Fabio Capello opted not to name his first choice goalkeeper until the day of England's opening match, against the United States on 12 June, at which point he selected Green to start. With England leading 1–0 in the 40th minute, Green failed to save a long-range shot from U.S. midfielder Clint Dempsey, which bounced off his gloves and into the net. The match ended in a 1–1 draw. Following this error and an unconvincing final training session on 17 June, Green was dropped. He was replaced by David James who played in England's other matches, starting with a 0–0 draw against Algeria on 18 June. He was omitted from the first England squad named after the tournament for a friendly against Hungary.

Green was brought back into the squad for the UEFA Euro 2012 qualifier against Montenegro in October 2010. On 16 May 2012, new England manager Roy Hodgson named Green as part of his 23-man squad for UEFA Euro 2012. On 26 May, he made his first appearance since the World Cup, and kept a clean sheet as England defeated Norway 1–0 in a friendly.

== Personal life ==
In the summer of 2008, Green climbed Mount Kilimanjaro during a charity event for AMREF (the African Medical and Research Foundation). He is a fan of Woking and cited the club's long-time custodian Laurence Batty as another goalkeeping inspiration.

Green stated in an interview in 2017 that he was studying at the Open University for a BA Hons Business Management Degree in order to have something to focus on after he retires from football.

Green has one permanently bent finger and claims to have played for ten years with a finger brace inside his goalkeeper gloves.

== Career statistics ==
=== Club ===
Appearances and goals by club, season and competition
| Club | Season | League | | | FA Cup | | League Cup | | Europe | | Other | | Total | |
| Club | Season | Division | Apps | Goals | Apps | Goals | Apps | Goals | Apps | Goals | Apps | Goals | Apps | Goals |
|---|---|---|---|---|---|---|---|---|---|---|---|---|---|---|
| Norwich City | 1998–99 | First Division | 2 | 0 | 0 | 0 | 0 | 0 | — | | — | | 2 | 0 |
| Norwich City | 1999–2000 | First Division | 3 | 0 | 0 | 0 | 0 | 0 | — | | — | | 3 | 0 |
| Norwich City | 2000–01 | First Division | 5 | 0 | 0 | 0 | 0 | 0 | — | | — | | 5 | 0 |
| Norwich City | 2001–02 | First Division | 41 | 0 | 2 | 0 | 1 | 0 | — | | 3 (Note: Appearance in First Division play-offs) | 0 | 47 | 0 |
| Norwich City | 2002–03 | First Division | 46 | 0 | 3 | 0 | 1 | 0 | — | | — | | 50 | 0 |
| Norwich City | 2003–04 | First Division | 46 | 0 | 1 | 0 | 1 | 0 | — | | — | | 48 | 0 |
| Norwich City | 2004–05 | Premier League | 38 | 0 | 1 | 0 | 2 | 0 | — | | — | | 41 | 0 |
| Norwich City | 2005–06 | Championship | 42 | 0 | 1 | 0 | 2 | 0 | — | | — | | 45 | 0 |
| Norwich City | 2006–07 | Championship | 0 | 0 | — | | — | | — | | — | | 0 | 0 |
| Norwich City | Total | | 223 | 0 | 8 | 0 | 7 | 0 | — | | 3 | 0 | 241 | 0 |
| West Ham United | 2006–07 | Premier League | 26 | 0 | 0 | 0 | 1 | 0 | 0 | 0 | — | | 27 | 0 |
| West Ham United | 2007–08 | Premier League | 38 | 0 | 2 | 0 | 1 | 0 | — | | — | | 41 | 0 |
| West Ham United | 2008–09 | Premier League | 38 | 0 | 4 | 0 | 1 | 0 | — | | — | | 43 | 0 |
| West Ham United | 2009–10 | Premier League | 38 | 0 | 1 | 0 | 2 | 0 | — | | — | | 41 | 0 |
| West Ham United | 2010–11 | Premier League | 37 | 0 | 4 | 0 | 3 | 0 | — | | — | | 44 | 0 |
| West Ham United | 2011–12 | Championship | 42 | 0 | 0 | 0 | 0 | 0 | — | | 3 (Note: Appearance in Championship play-offs) | 0 | 45 | 0 |
| West Ham United | Total | | 219 | 0 | 11 | 0 | 8 | 0 | 0 | 0 | 3 | 0 | 241 | 0 |
| Queens Park Rangers | 2012–13 | Premier League | 16 | 0 | 2 | 0 | 1 | 0 | — | | — | | 19 | 0 |
| Queens Park Rangers | 2013–14 | Championship | 45 | 0 | 0 | 0 | 0 | 0 | — | | 3 | 0 | 48 | 0 |
| Queens Park Rangers | 2014–15 | Premier League | 36 | 0 | 0 | 0 | 0 | 0 | — | | — | | 36 | 0 |
| Queens Park Rangers | 2015–16 | Championship | 24 | 0 | 0 | 0 | 1 | 0 | — | | — | | 25 | 0 |
| Queens Park Rangers | Total | | 121 | 0 | 2 | 0 | 2 | 0 | — | | 3 | 0 | 128 | 0 |
| Leeds United | 2016–17 | Championship | 46 | 0 | 0 | 0 | 1 | 0 | — | | — | | 47 | 0 |
| Leeds United | 2017–18 | Championship | 0 | 0 | — | | 1 | 0 | — | | — | | 1 | 0 |
| Leeds United | Total | | 46 | 0 | 0 | 0 | 2 | 0 | — | | — | | 48 | 0 |
| Huddersfield Town | 2017–18 | Premier League | 0 | 0 | 0 | 0 | — | | — | | — | | 0 | 0 |
| Chelsea | 2018–19 | Premier League | 0 | 0 | 0 | 0 | 0 | 0 | 0 | 0 | 0 | 0 | 0 | 0 |
| Career total | | | 609 | 0 | 21 | 0 | 19 | 0 | 0 | 0 | 9 | 0 | 658 | 0 |

=== International ===
Appearances and goals by national team and year
| National team | Year | Apps | Goals |
|---|---|---|---|
| England | 2005 | 1 | 0 |
| England | 2006 | 0 | 0 |
| England | 2007 | 0 | 0 |
| England | 2008 | 0 | 0 |
| England | 2009 | 7 | 0 |
| England | 2010 | 3 | 0 |
| England | 2011 | 0 | 0 |
| England | 2012 | 1 | 0 |
| Total | | 12 | 0 |

== Honours ==
Norwich City

- Football League First Division: 2003–04

West Ham United

- Football League Championship play-offs: 2012

Queens Park Rangers

- Football League Championship play-offs: 2014

Individual

- PFA Team of the Year: 2003–04 First Division
- West Ham United Hammer of the Year: 2007–08
