= Chris Llewellyn =

Welsh footballer

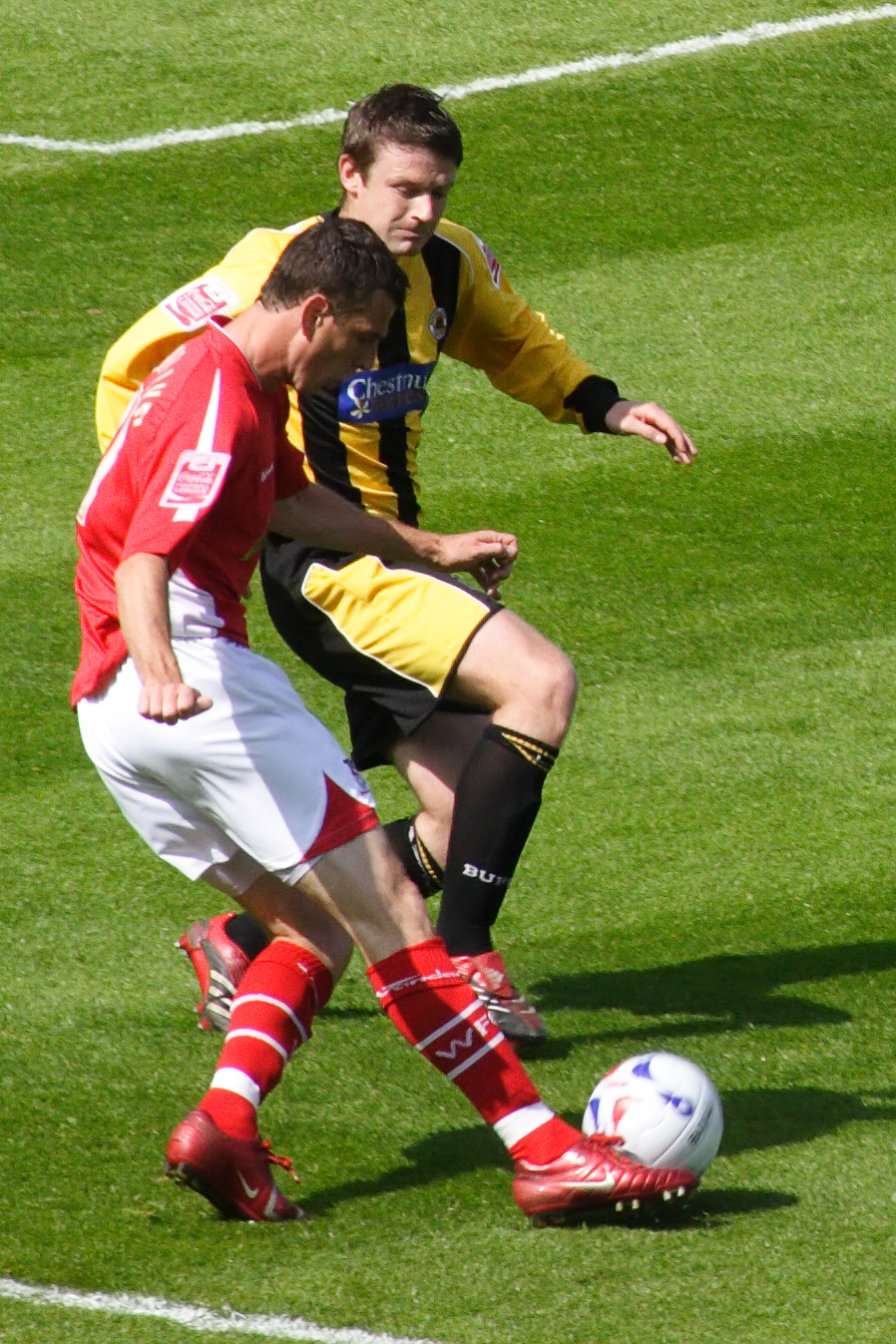
- Llewellyn (in red) playing for Wrexham in 2007.

Personal information
- Full name: Christopher Mark Llewellyn
- Date of birth: 28 August 1979 (age 47)
- Place of birth: Merthyr Tydfil, Wales
- Height: 5 ft 11 in (1.80 m)
- Positions: Midfielder; striker

Team information
- Current team: Colchester United under-18s (manager)

Senior career*
| Years | Team | Apps | (Gls) |
| 1996–2003 | Norwich City | 142 | (17) |
| 2003 | → Bristol Rovers (loan) | 14 | (3) |
| 2003–2005 | Wrexham | 91 | (15) |
| 2005–2006 | Hartlepool United | 29 | (0) |
| 2006–2008 | Wrexham | 79 | (12) |
| 2008–2009 | Grimsby Town | 28 | (0) |
| 2009–2010 | Neath | 34 | (9) |
| 2010–2012 | Llanelli | 14 | (3) |
| 2012 | → Aberystwyth Town (loan) | 1 | (0) |
| 2012–2013 | West End | 0 | (0) |
| Total | | 432 | (59) |

International career
| 1997–2001 | Wales U21 | 14 | (0) |
| 1998 | Wales B | 1 | (0) |
| 1998–2007 | Wales | 6 | (1) |

Managerial career
- 2014–2015: Swansea City (U21s)
- 2015–2017: Swansea City (U18s)
- 2017–2021: Colchester United U18
- 2021: Swansea City Ladies
- * Club domestic league appearances and goals

Christopher Mark Llewellyn (born 28 August 1979) is a Welsh football coach and former professional footballer.

He has made over 350 appearances in the Football League for Norwich City, Bristol Rovers, Wrexham, Hartlepool United and Grimsby Town, before joining Welsh Premier League sides Neath, Llanelli and Aberystwyth Town. He earned 6 full international caps for Wales, scoring once from between 1998 and 2006. He also previously earned 14 caps for the Wales U21 team.

== Club career ==
=== Norwich City ===
A product of the Norwich City youth team, Llewellyn broke into the first team at Norwich in the 1997–1998 season making a total of 16 appearances with 4 goals. After injury in the 2002–03 season, he lost his place and went on loan to Bristol Rovers; he was released in June 2003 from Norwich. He earnt cult hero status at Norwich, with a song: 'Try and spell his effing name, effing name, effing name, try and spell his effing name, Chris Llewellyn.'

=== Wrexham ===
Llewellyn signed for Wrexham and a strong 2003–04 season saw him recalled to the Welsh squad in May 2004 and come on a sub to win his third cap against Norway. He took part in the club's Football League Trophy win in 2005.

=== Hartlepool United ===
Later, he signed for Hartlepool United but only stayed one season and returned on a free to Wrexham on 29 June 2006. He scored once for Hartlepool in an FA Cup tie against Tamworth.

=== Return to Wrexham ===
On the final day of the 2006–2007 season, Wrexham needed to avoid defeat against Boston United to avoid relegation to the Conference National. After coming from 1–0 down, Llewellyn scored the goal which handed the Red Dragons a 2–1 lead before they eventually won 3–1 and preserved their Football League Two status. He was released by Wrexham in May 2008 following the club's relegation to the Football Conference.

=== Grimsby Town ===
He joined Grimsby Town on a two-year contract in July 2008. He made his league debut in the opening game of the season, in the goalless draw with Rochdale. He made 32 appearances in all competitions for Grimsby, 17 as substitute.

=== Neath ===
Llewellyn was released by Grimsby at the end of the 2008–09 season and joined Welsh Premier League side Neath Athletic. After scoring five times in the opening five games of the season, Neath manager Andrew Dyer praised Llewellyn's performances and described him as "the best striker in the league". However, he scored just four times during the rest of the season.

=== Llanelli ===
In June 2010, he left Neath by mutual consent to sign for Llanelli. Llewellyn scored in the 2010–11 UEFA Europa League second leg tie against FK Tauras Tauragė.

He joined Aberystwyth Town on loan in January 2012. He left Llanelli in June 2012 after being released.

=== West End ===
In June 2012, Llewellyn was appointed player-assistant manager at Welsh Football League side West End alongside manager Anthony Wright.

== Coaching career ==
In December 2012, Llewellyn joined Swansea City as a full-time youth coach. In February 2014, Llewellyn became manager of Swansea City Under 21s. Llewellyn replaced Kristian O'Leary who was promoted to the role of Assistant First Team Coach.

In 2015, the Under-21s won the 2014–15 Professional U21 Development League 2. In doing so, the under-21s became the first Swansea City Academy age-group to win an English national development trophy.

Ahead of the 2015–16 season, Llewellyn took charge of the under-18s team alongside Eric Ramsay.

On 12 August 2021 Swansea City Ladies appointed Chris Llewellyn as head coach, but he left after less than a month in charge.

== International career ==
He gained Welsh B and under-21 honours. He later won full honours and made his Welsh debut against Malta in 1998. He was recalled to the full Wales squad in May 2004 and come on a sub to win his 3rd cap against Norway. Llewellyn scored his first international goal for Wales against Liechtenstein in November 2006 alongside his ex Norwich City strike partner Craig Bellamy.

== Honours ==
Wrexham

- Football League Trophy: 2004–05
