= Jean-Yves de Blasiis =

French footballer (born 1973)

Jean Yves de Blasiis
Personal information
- Date of birth: September 25, 1973 (age 53)
- Place of birth: Bordeaux, France
- Position: Midfielder

Senior career*
Years	Team	Apps	(Gls)
1995–1996	Bordeaux	19	(0)
1996–1997	Caen	14	(0)
1997–1999	Red Star		
1999–2001	Norwich City	38	(0)
2001–2001	Istres	18	(0)
- * Club domestic league appearances and goals

Jean Yves de Blasiis (born 25 September 1973) is a French former professional footballer.

De Blasiis, a midfielder, began his career with his hometown club Bordeaux where he won the 1995 UEFA Intertoto Cup. He then moved to Caen and then Red Star. In the summer of 1999, Norwich City manager Bruce Rioch signed him on a Bosman free transfer. After a promising start, his spell at Norwich was wrecked by a cruciate ligament injury and the club released him the summer of 2001. He returned to France, where he played for his former club Bordeaux and Istres.

== Sources ==
- Mark Davage; John Eastwood; Kevin Platt (2001). Canary Citizens. Jarrold Publishing. ISBN 0-7117-2020-7.
