= Fernando Derveld =

Dutch footballer

Personal information
- Full name: Fernando Albert Derveld
- Date of birth: 22 October 1976 (age 50)
- Place of birth: Vlissingen, Netherlands
- Height: 1.80 m (5 ft 11 in)
- Position: Left back

Youth career
- Walcheren
- PSV

Senior career*
Years	Team	Apps	(Gls)
1995–1996	PSV	0	(0)
1996–1998	Willem II	40	(1)
1998–2000	Haarlem	37	(1)
2000–2001	Norwich City	22	(1)
2001	→ West Bromwich Albion (loan)	2	(0)
2001–2005	OB	122	(6)
2005–2006	Heerenveen	18	(1)
2006–2008	Esbjerg	39	(0)
2008	Dordrecht	6	(0)
Total		286	(10)

International career
1993	Netherlands U17	1	(0)
- * Club domestic league appearances and goals

Fernando Albert Derveld (born 22 October 1976) is a Dutch retired footballer. He played as a left back.

== Club career ==
Derveld began his career in his home country the Netherlands, playing for the youth teams of Walcheren and PSV, before he made his senior debut with Willem II in the 1995–96 season. After three seasons at Willem II, he moved on to Haarlem, where he stayed for one and a half years. He had a trial with English club Norwich City in early 2000, though the then City manager Bruce Rioch declined to offer him a contract. Rioch's successor at Norwich - Bryan Hamilton - did give him a contract when he took over towards the end of the 1999–00 season.

In total, Derveld played 25 games for Norwich, scoring one goal in a 3–2 win at West Bromwich Albion. He struggled to find form and was not held in high esteem by City supporters. When Hamilton left the club in late 2000, his successor - Nigel Worthington - made it clear that Derveld did not figure in his plans, and after a loan spell at West Bromwich Albion, his contract with Norwich was terminated in the summer of 2001.

He moved on to play for OB in the Danish Superliga, under head coach Troels Bech. While playing in a UEFA Cup match for OB against Celta Vigo in 2002, Derveld scored from a free-kick and was then sent off moments later. Derveld was ever-present in the Odense starting formation, and in the summer 2005, he moved back to the Netherlands to play for Heerenveen. Following a mediocre season at Heerenveen, he returned to Denmark, where he re-united with Bech at Esbjerg. Summer 2008 Derveld and Esbjerg fB agreed to cancel the player contract.

In the summer of 2008, he moved to Dordrecht, but he was already released by the club in November that year.

== International career ==
Derveld played once for the Netherlands national under-17 football team.

== Post-playing career ==
Derveld suddenly quit professional football after his daughter was struck by meningitis during a holiday in the Dominican Republic. Since then, she has suffered from intellectual disabilities and epileptic seizures.

Derveld was named head coach of the Willem II under-14 team ahead of the 2023–24 season and became assistant to head coach Frans Danen at the ADO Den Haag under-17 team a year later.

== Derveld as a painter ==
Fernando has painted a few paintings. A couple of paintings were painted for a charity auction in Esbjerg in 2006.

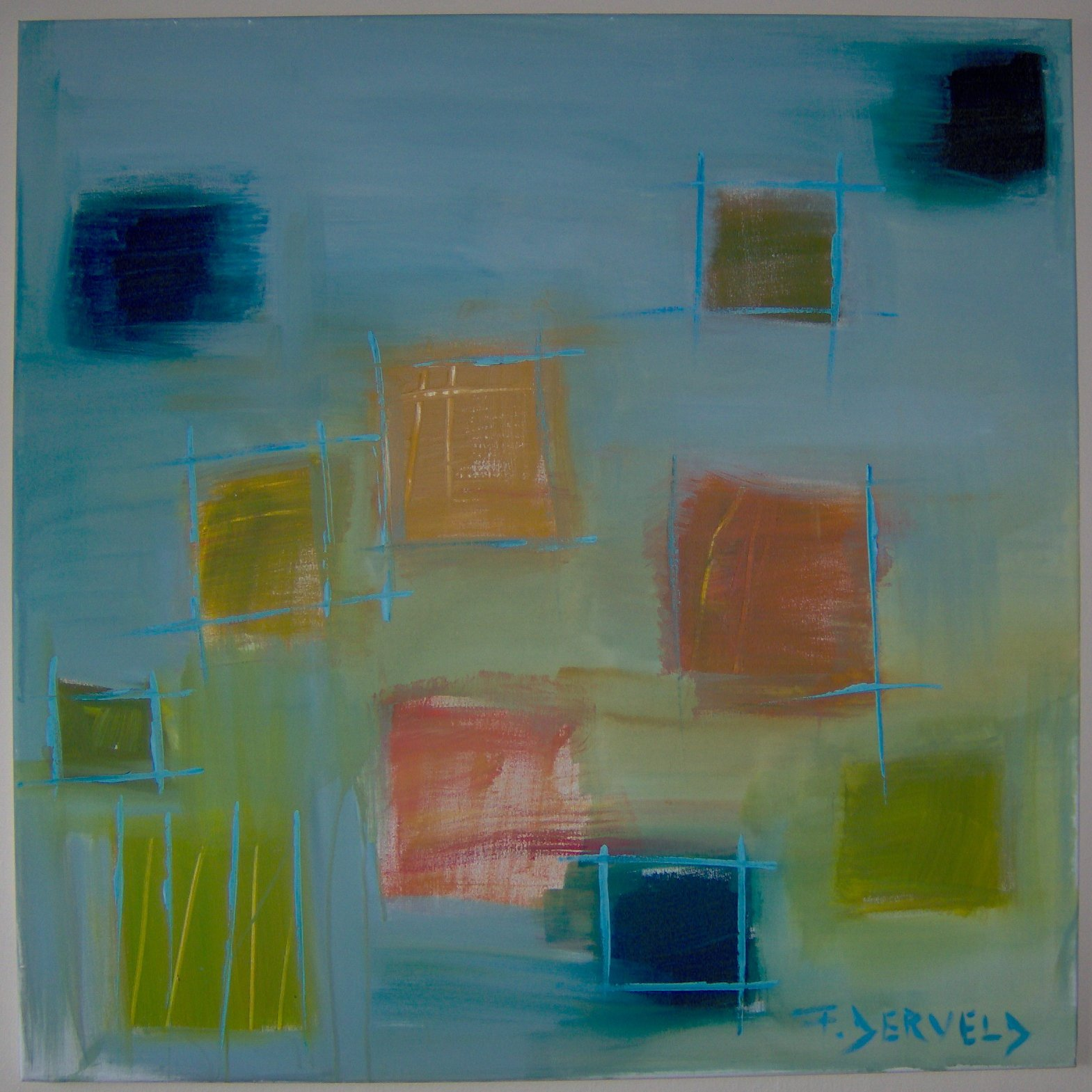
Squares, 90 x 90 cm. Currently situated in a private collection in Denmark.

== Honours ==
OB

- Danish Cup: 2001–02
