= Lee Marshall (footballer, born 1979) =

English footballer (born 1979)

Personal information
- Date of birth: 21 January 1979 (age 47)
- Place of birth: Islington, England
- Positions: Midfielder; right-back

Youth career
- Enfield

Senior career*
Years	Team	Apps	(Gls)
1997–2001	Norwich City	107	(11)
2001–2002	Leicester City	45	(0)
2002–2005	West Bromwich Albion	9	(1)
2004	→ Hull City (loan)	11	(0)
Total		182	(12)

International career
1999	England U21	1	(0)
- * Club domestic league appearances and goals

Lee Marshall (born 21 January 1979) is an English retired professional footballer who played as a midfielder or right-back. He earned one cap with the England U21 national team.

== Club career ==
Marshall began his career in non-league football with Enfield, before signing for Norwich City. He then made a £600,000 switch to Leicester City in March 2001.

Marshall moved on to West Bromwich Albion for £700,000 in August 2002. However, he found his first team chances limited, making ten appearances, although he did have the distinction of scoring the club's first goal in the Premier League, a late consolation in a 3–1 home defeat to Leeds United.

During a spell on loan at Hull City, Marshall suffered a broken leg and was forced to retire from playing in 2005.

== International career ==
Marshall was capped by England at under-21 level in a friendly match against France.

== Career statistics ==
Appearances and goals by club, season and competition
Club	Season	League		FA Cup		League Cup		Other		Total	
Club	Season	Apps	Goals	Apps	Goals	Apps	Goals	Apps	Goals	Apps	Goals
Norwich City	1997–98	4	0	0	0	0	0	0	0	4	0
Norwich City	1998–99	44	3	1	0	5	0	0	0	50	3
Norwich City	1999–2000	33	5	0	0	3	1	0	0	36	6
Norwich City	2000–01	36	3	1	0	4	1	0	0	41	4
Norwich City	Total	117	11	2	0	12	2	0	0	131	13
Leicester City	2000–01	9	0	0	0	0	0	0	0	9	0
Leicester City	2001–02	35	0	2	0	1	0	0	0	38	0
Leicester City	2002–03	1	0	0	0	0	0	0	0	1	0
Leicester City	Total	45	0	2	0	1	0	0	0	48	0
West Bromwich Albion	2002–03	9	1	0	0	1	0	0	0	10	1
West Bromwich Albion	2003–04	0	0	0	0	0	0	0	0	0	0
West Bromwich Albion	Total	9	1	0	0	1	0	0	0	10	1
Hull City (loan)	2003–04	11	0	0	0	0	0	0	0	11	0
Career total		182	12	4	0	14	2	0	0	200	14
