= Danny Gay (footballer) =

English footballer

Personal information
- Full name: Daniel Karl Gay
- Date of birth: 5 August 1982 (age 44)
- Place of birth: Kings Lynn, England
- Height: 6 ft 1 in (1.85 m)
- Position: Goalkeeper

Youth career
- 1997–2001: Norwich City

Senior career*
| Years | Team | Apps | (Gls) |
| 2001–2003 | Southend United | 11 | (0) |
| 2003–2004 | Hornchurch | 68 | (0) |
| 2004–2005 | Braintree Town | 68 | (0) |
| 2005 | Bishop's Stortford | 14 | (0) |
| 2006 | Braintree Town | 27 | (1) |
| 2006–2007 | Heybridge Swifts | 49 | (0) |
| 2007–2009 | Chelmsford City | 79 | (0) |
| 2009 | King's Lynn | 89 | |
| 2009–2011 | Needham Market | 57 | (0) |
| 2011–2013 | AFC Sudbury | 65 | |
| 2013–2015 | Leiston | 91 | |
| 2015 | St Neots Town | 18 | (0) |
| 2015–2018 | Needham Market | 172 | (1) |
- * Club domestic league appearances and goals as of 23:30, 4 March 2019 (UTC)

Daniel Karl Gay (born 5 August 1982) is an English retired footballer who last played for Needham Market. He made eleven appearances in Football League Two for Southend United between 2001 and 2003.

== Career ==
Gay graduated through the youth, academy and reserve sides at Norwich City made many first team squads and was on the bench 15 times but made no appearances in the first team and joined Football League Two club Southend United on a free transfer in 2001. He made eleven league appearances for Southend in two seasons and was called into Welsh Under-21 squads for two UEFA championship qualifiers against Azerbaijan and Serbia and Montenegro in March and April 2003, before being allowed to leave Southend at the end of the 2002–03 season. He then dropped into non-league football and played for Hornchurch. He was part of the successful side that made it to round two of the FA Cup losing 1–0 to Tranmere Rovers. During that season he was named player of year and selected in the Ryman League Team of the Year. He had a brief trial at Bradford City A.F.C., who offered him a contract but due to his age compensation was required, Braintree Town, Bishops Stortford and Heybridge Swifts. Gay had a trial with Leeds United, playing in two pre-season friendlies in July 2007, before joining Chelmsford City. During his first season, the club won the Ryman league. He was released by Chelmsford City at the end of the 2008–09 season, after two seasons at the club.

He signed for Needham Market, then joined A.F.C. Sudbury in July 2011. Gay then returned to King's Lynn F.C. in which they won the Northern Premier League. Division One South champions 2012–13. Gay then joined Leiston in October 2013, before signing for Southern Premier Division side St Neots Town in June 2015. He then left to rejoin Needham Market in which he enjoyed 2 successful seasons winning the Suffolk Premier Cup against Lowestoft Town. That season he was awarded player of the year. In his final season at Needham Market they missed out on the play-offs. Gay retired in 2018. However had come out of retirement in 2021 to help former teammate Micheal Shinn at Newmarket Town Fc and more recently 2022 helping Heacham F.C. gain promotion to Thurlow Nunn League
