= 2002 Football League First Division play-off final =

Association football match in Cardiff, UK

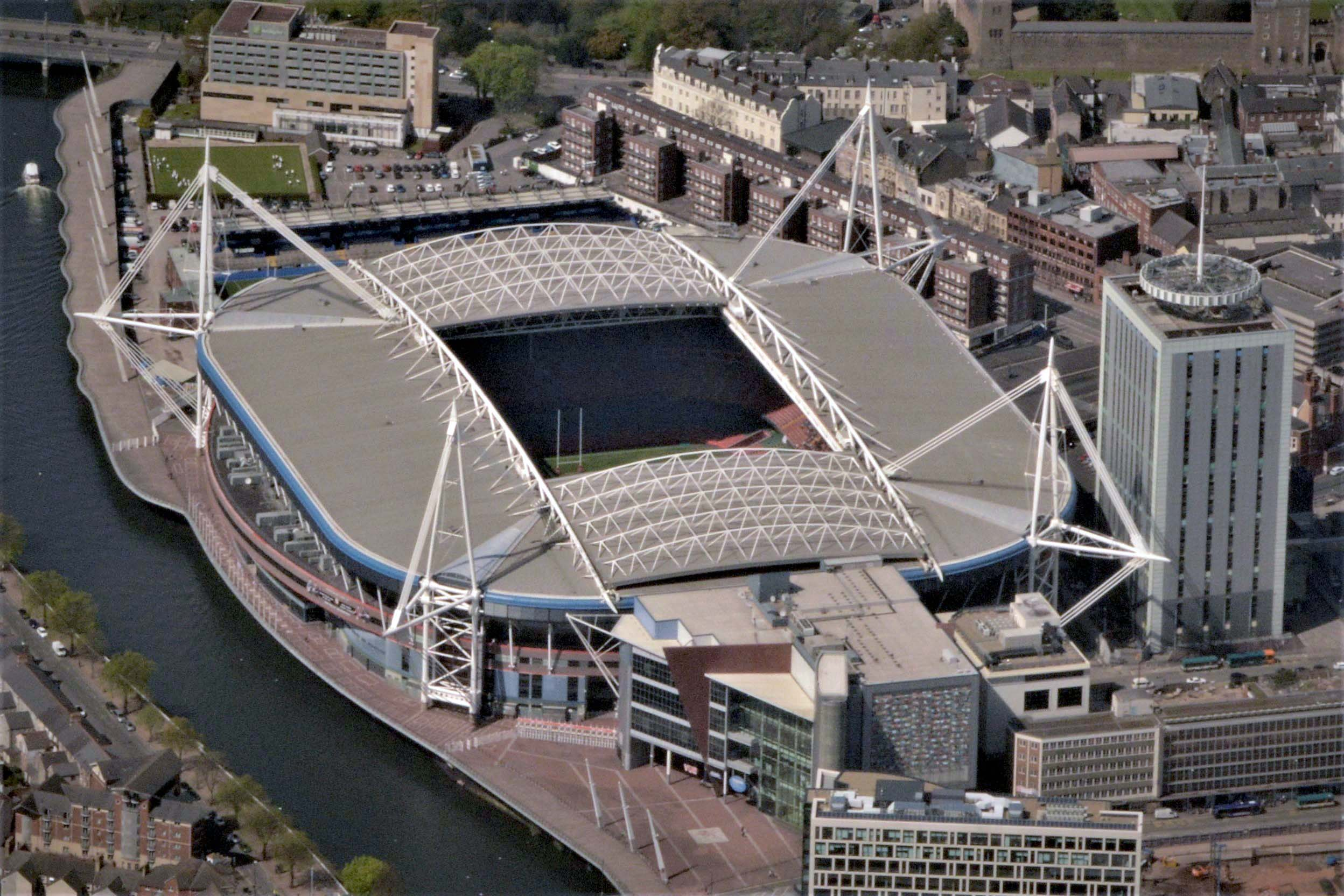
- The match took place at the Millennium Stadium.
| Norwich City | Birmingham City |
| 1 | 1 |
- After extra time Birmingham City won 4–2 on penalties
- Date: 12 May 2002
- Venue: Millennium Stadium, Cardiff, Wales
- Referee: Graham Barber (Tring)
- Attendance: 71,597

The 2002 Football League First Division play-off final was an association football match between Birmingham City and Norwich City held on 12 May 2002 at the Millennium Stadium in Cardiff, Wales. It was held to determine the third and final team to gain promotion from the Football League First Division, the second tier of English football, to the Premiership. The top two teams of the 2001–02 Football League First Division season gained automatic promotion to the Premiership, while those ranked from third to sixth place in the table took part in play-off semi-finals. Birmingham ended in fifth position while Norwich finished sixth. The winners of these semi-finals competed for the final place for the 2002–03 season in the Premiership, in a match that was estimated to be worth up to £30 million to the successful team.

The game ended goalless in regular time sending the match into extra time. Seconds into the first half, Iwan Roberts put Norwich ahead with a header from an Alex Notman cross. Eleven minutes later, Birmingham's Geoff Horsfield scored the equaliser. Stern John nodded the ball across the Norwich penalty area allowing Horsfield to head the ball in, making it 1–1. No further goals were scored, leading to a penalty shootout. Philip Mulryne's spot kick was saved by Birmingham City's goalkeeper Nico Vaesen, while Daryl Sutch's strike missed. Birmingham scored all their penalties and Darren Carter took the winning spot-kick, ending the game at 4–2.

Norwich City ended the following season in eighth place in the 2002–03 Football League First Division, five points below the play-offs. Birmingham City's next season saw them finish in thirteenth place in the 2002–03 Premiership, six points above the relegation zone.

== Route to the final ==
Football League First Division final table, leading positions
| Pos | Team | Pld | W | D | L | GF | GA | GD | Pts |
|---|---|---|---|---|---|---|---|---|---|
| 1 | Manchester City | 46 | 31 | 6 | 9 | 108 | 52 | +56 | 99 |
| 2 | West Bromwich Albion | 46 | 27 | 8 | 11 | 61 | 29 | +32 | 89 |
| 3 | Wolverhampton Wanderers | 46 | 25 | 11 | 10 | 76 | 43 | +33 | 86 |
| 4 | Millwall | 46 | 22 | 11 | 13 | 69 | 48 | +21 | 77 |
| 5 | Birmingham City | 46 | 21 | 13 | 12 | 70 | 49 | +21 | 76 |
| 6 | Norwich City | 46 | 22 | 9 | 15 | 60 | 51 | +9 | 75 |

Birmingham City finished the regular 2001–02 season in fifth place in the Football League First Division, the second tier of the English football league system, one place ahead of Norwich City. Both teams therefore missed out on the two automatic places for promotion to the Premiership and instead took part in the play-offs to determine the third promoted team. Birmingham City finished 13 points behind West Bromwich Albion (who were promoted in second place) and 23 behind league winners Manchester City. Norwich City ended the season one point behind Birmingham City, and level with Burnley but with superior goal difference. Birmingham secured their place in the semi-finals with a win on the final day of the regular season.

Norwich City's play-off opponents for the semi-final were Wolverhampton Wanderers, who had ended the regular season in third place. The first leg was played at Norwich's home stadium, Carrow Road, on 28 April 2002. Dean Sturridge scored the 21st goal of his season to put Wolves ahead midway through the first half, but Mark Rivers levelled the match 11 minutes after half time with a volley from 7 yards (6.4 m). Paul McVeigh then put Norwich into the lead with a 73rd minute header, before an injury-time goal from Malky Mackay secured a 3–1 win for the home team. The return leg, played at Molineux, took place three days later. After a goalless first half, Kevin Cooper gave Wolves the lead with a strike from 35 yards (32 m) in the 76th minute. Late misses from Norwich's Iwan Roberts and Wolves' Paul Butler meant the game ended 1–0 to Wolves, but saw Norwich qualify for the final 3–2 on aggregate.

Birmingham City faced Millwall in their play-off semi-final, with the first leg held at St Andrew's in Birmingham on 28 April 2002. Following a goalless first half, Bryan Hughes scored early in the second half to put the home team ahead. With eleven minutes remaining, Dion Dublin, on loan from Birmingham's local rivals Aston Villa, headed in the equaliser from a Steven Reid cross, and the match ended 1–1. The second semi-final was held four days later at The Den. Ronnie Bull cleared a goal-bound header from Olivier Tébily to keep the score 0–0 at half time. Dublin missed a chance early in the second half, shooting wide from 6 yards (5.5 m). In the last minute of regular time, a shot across the Millwall penalty area by Steve Vickers was struck into the net by Stern John, winning the game for Birmingham 1–0, and a 2–1 aggregate victory. After the match, Millwall fans rioted in what police described as "the worst incidents of football hooliganism for more than 20 years".

| Birmingham City | | | Round | Norwich City |
|---|---|---|---|---|---|---|
| Opponent | Result | Legs | Semi-finals | Opponent | Result | Legs |
| Millwall | 2–1 | 1–1 home; 1–0 away | | Wolverhampton Wanderers | 3–2 | 3–1 home; 0–1 away |

== Match ==
=== Background ===
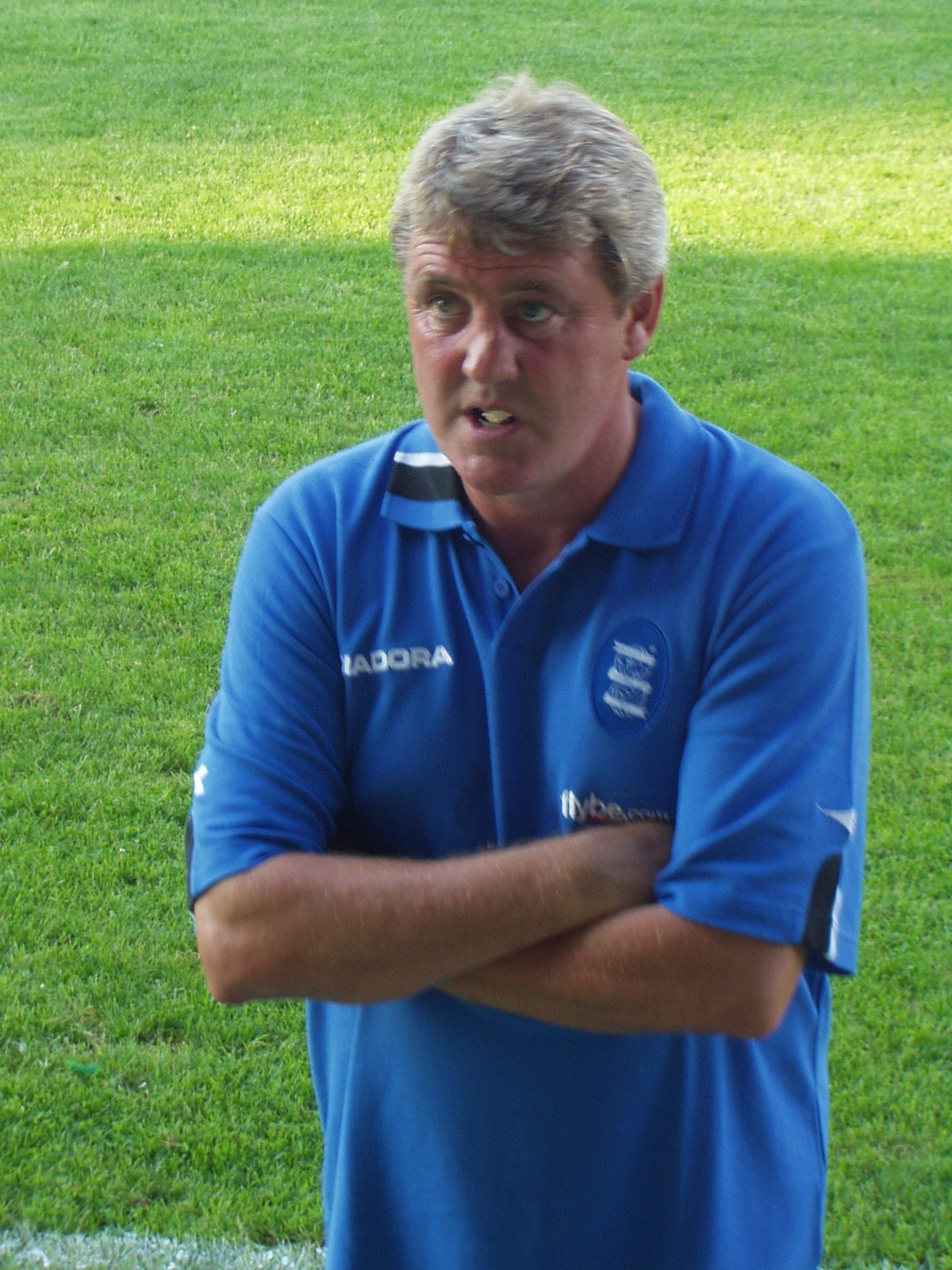
Steve Bruce (pictured in 2004) had played for both Norwich and Birmingham City.

This was the first time either Norwich or Birmingham City had qualified for the second-tier play-off final. Birmingham had secured a berth in the play-offs for the previous three seasons, but in each case had lost in the semi-finals. In the 1999 Football League play-offs, Birmingham were knocked out 7–6 in a penalty shootout by Watford after the aggregate score finished 1–1. The following season's play-offs saw them defeated 5–2 across two legs against Barnsley, while in the 2001 Football League play-offs, they lost again on penalties, this time to Preston North End. Birmingham had played in the second tier of English football since they were promoted in their 1994–95 season. Norwich had played in the Football League First Division since their 1995–96 season after being relegated from the 1994–95 Premiership. During the regular season, the highest scorers for Norwich were Roberts with thirteen goals, followed by McVeigh and David Nielsen, both of whom scored eight. Tommy Mooney was Birmingham's top marksman with fifteen, followed by Marcelo on twelve. Birmingham City had won both encounters between the clubs during the season, winning 4–0 at St Andrew's in December, and 1–0 at Carrow Road the following March.

Delia Smith, a director at Norwich City, said that the club was attempting to model itself on Charlton Athletic who had retained top-tier status following promotion. She noted: "We'd like to become a modern football club like Charlton. We've long had Charlton as our ideal." The Birmingham City manager Steve Bruce had been appointed five months earlier, replacing Mick Mills and Jim Barron. He captained Norwich City as a player in the 1980s, making 180 appearances and scoring 20 goals. Speaking of his former club, Bruce admitted that "Norwich put me on the map and I will always feel I owe them something".

According to bookmakers and the media, Birmingham had been favourites to win. The referee for the match was Graham Barber from Tring. It was reported that winning the match was worth £20–30 million. A significant police operation was mounted with concerns over potential clashes of Cardiff City fans with those of Brentford and Stoke City who had contested the Second Division play-off final the day before. Birmingham were aiming to overcome the "dressing room curse" which had seen none of the eleven clubs using the south changing room win since matches were moved from Wembley Stadium to the Millennium Stadium. Birmingham were the first club to lose having used those facilities in the 2001 Football League Cup Final. In anticipation of sunny weather it was announced that the roof of the stadium would be closed "in the interests of play-off spectator comfort". It was the first time such a course of action had been taken other than for inclement weather. Prior to kick off, the girl group Atomic Kitten played a set.

=== First half ===
The match kicked off at 3:30 p.m. in front of a Millennium Stadium crowd of 71,597. Birmingham dominated the opening exchanges, with a Martin Grainger free kick going over the Norwich crossbar from 20 yards (18 m) and Hughes' shot going wide. Norwich's first attack in the 13th minute saw Rivers' cross defended for a corner. A minute later, John's shot following his run went wide with only the Norwich goalkeeper Robert Green to beat. Nielsen then toe-poked his shot wide of Birmingham's goal before a volley from Norwich's Clint Easton passed outside the post. John's strike then cleared the Norwich bar. Just before the half-time whistle was blown, Green saved a close-range Geoff Horsfield half-volley from a Mooney header to ensure the first half ended 0–0.

=== Second half ===
Green made a save from Tebily early in the second half before Birmingham's goalkeeper Nico Vaesen tipped a shot from McVeigh over the bar. Nielsen then headed wide of the goal from 10 yards (9.1 m). John's shot was then blocked by Adam Drury before Paul Devlin's direct free kick was inches high. Birmingham ended the half the stronger team with Tebily striking over the bar, before Jeff Kenna intercepted to deny Roberts a shot. As regular time ended with a goalless match, extra time was played.

=== Extra time and penalties ===
Norwich scored within the first minute of extra time when Roberts headed in from an Alex Notman cross. The lead lasted eleven minutes before Birmingham equalised. Kenna crossed for John who headed the ball back across goal. Green was stranded allowing Horsfield to head the ball in at the far post. A free kick from Mulryne was tipped behind by Vaesen before Michael Johnson's header was cleared off Norwich's goalline by Drury. With two minutes of extra time remaining, Johnson then struck Grainger's pass from a free kick against the bottom of Norwich's goalpost. There were no more goals and the game finished at 1–1 requiring a penalty shoot-out to decide the winner.

Roberts took the first penalty for Norwich, and scored. John then levelled the score at 1–1 before Vaesen saved Mulryne's attempt. Devlin's penalty made it 2–1 to Birmingham. Daryl Sutch missed his shot, after which Stan Lazaridis scored. Easton converted his spot-kick but Darren Carter stepped up to curl a left-footed shot into the right-hand corner of the net to secure the victory for Birmingham City, 4–2 on penalties after a 1–1 draw in extra time.

=== Details ===
12 May 2002
15:30 BST

| Norwich City | 1–1 (a.e.t.) | Birmingham City |
|---|---|---|
| Roberts 91' | | Horsfield 102' |
Penalties
| Roberts (penalty scored); Mulryne (penalty missed); Sutch (penalty missed); Easton (penalty scored) | 2–4 | (penalty scored) John; (penalty scored) Devlin; (penalty scored) Lazaridis; (penalty scored) Carter |

Millennium Stadium, Cardiff
Attendance: 71,597
Referee: Graham Barber (Tring)

| Norwich City | Birmingham City |

| GK | 1 | (England) Robert Green |
| RB | 15 | (England) Darren Kenton |
| CB | 4 | (Scotland) Malky Mackay |
| CB | 5 | (England) Craig Fleming |
| LB | 3 | (England) Adam Drury |
| RM | 27 | (England) Mark Rivers | (substituted off) 90' |
| CM | 7 | (Northern Ireland) Philip Mulryne |
| CM | 8 | (Scotland) Gary Holt |
| LM | 24 | (England) Clint Easton |
| CF | 18 | (Northern Ireland) Paul McVeigh | (substituted off) 102' |
| CF | 6 | (Denmark) David Nielsen | (substituted off) 83' |
Substitutes:
| GK | 28 | (England) Paul Crichton |
| DF | 17 | (England) Daryl Sutch | (substituted on) 102' |
| FW | 14 | (Scotland) Alex Notman | (substituted on) 90' |
| FW | 9 | (Wales) Iwan Roberts | (substituted on) 83' |
| FW | 19 | (France) Marc Libbra |
Manager:
(Northern Ireland) Nigel Worthington

| GK | 18 | (Belgium) Nico Vaesen |
| RB | 36 | (Republic of Ireland) Jeff Kenna |
| CB | 17 | (Jamaica) Michael Johnson |
| CB | 35 | (England) Steve Vickers | (substituted off) 71' |
| LB | 3 | (England) Martin Grainger |
| CM | 37 | (England) Paul Devlin |
| CM | 10 | (England) Bryan Hughes |
| CM | 26 | (Ivory Coast) Olivier Tébily |
| CF | 16 | (England) Tommy Mooney | (substituted off) 69' |
| CF | 9 | (England) Geoff Horsfield | (substituted off) 113' |
| CF | 8 | (Trinidad and Tobago) Stern John |
Substitutes:
| GK | 1 | (England) Ian Bennett |
| MF | 33 | (England) Darren Carter | (substituted on) 71' |
| MF | 22 | (Northern Ireland) Damien Johnson |
| MF | 11 | (Australia) Stan Lazaridis | (substituted on) 69' |
| FW | 19 | (England) Andrew Johnson | (substituted on) 113' |
Manager:
(England) Steve Bruce

== Post-match ==
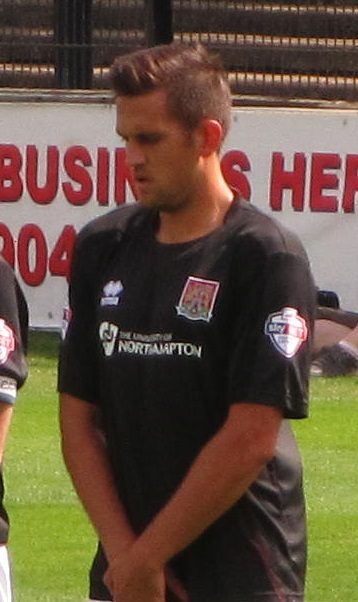
Darren Carter (pictured in 2013) scored the winning penalty for Birmingham City.

The Birmingham midfielder Devlin said of Carter, the winning penalty-taker, that it was "fitting that a Brummie lad scores the goal that gets us up. For someone of 18 to take the penalty as calmly as he did, in a game of this magnitude, is unbelievable". Carter himself admitted: "I won't sleep for days now....It's unbelievable. Birmingham fans have been waiting for this for a very long time. I was a fan and I know how much it means to them. This season is my first and to be playing in the Premiership next year is absolutely unbelievable." Describing the win, the Norwich City manager Nigel Worthington said: "It's been a wonderful ride and I am proud of every one of my players. Our performance showed that we are on the right track but it wasn't our day." He bemoaned the financial impact of the failure to be promoted: "If we had been promoted we would have had money to spend but now we might end up looking for Bosman signings". Bruce commiserated with his former club: "I have to say to Norwich that it is a very cruel way to lose a football match." He made his aspirations for the following season clear: "Our first aim is to try and stay up – we will be doing our best to finish fourth bottom". Birmingham's managing director Karren Brady explained: "We have arranged a meeting this week at David Sullivan's house to discuss the players that we are going to sign." The club chairman, David Gold, was grateful for the monetary prize, but warned: "We are leaving behind some serious trouble in the lower divisions with the shortfall of the ITV Digital money".

Mackay said: "It took Birmingham four goes to get back where they are now and I don’t see why we can’t bounce back ... It is important that we get on with it, bounce back, start again and do it all again next year." Sutch spoke of his penalty miss: "I felt cool, I wanted to take it and I knew where I wanted to put it. Unfortunately it didn't go in. We’ve been practising penalties for two or three weeks now and I was confident." It was Norwich City's fifth penalty shootout and their second loss.

Roberts later said that he believed that he had scored "a golden goal. There had been a couple of competitions in the years leading up to it where the golden goal had come into play and for some reason I thought that was going to carry on into this play-off final ... I straightened my shirt, put my collar down and looked around – and they are all ready to take kick-off. It just clicked there, ‘Jeez, it's not golden goal and there's plenty of time for them to get back into it."

Norwich City ended the following season in eighth place in the 2002–03 Football League First Division, five points below the play-offs. Birmingham City finished thirteenth place in their next season, when they finished six points above the relegation zone in the premiership.
