= 2003–04 Norwich City F.C. season =

Norwich City
2003–04 season
- Chairman: Roger Munby
- Manager: Nigel Worthington
- Stadium: Carrow Road
- Football League First Division: 1st (promoted to FA Premier League)
- FA Cup: Third round
- Carling Cup: First round
- Top goalscorer: League: Darren Huckerby (14); All: Darren Huckerby (14)
- Highest home attendance: 23,942 (vs. Ipswich Town, 7 March 2004)
- Lowest home attendance: 16,082 (vs. Wimbledon, 26 August 2003)
- Average home league attendance: 18,866
| Home colours | Away colours |

The 2003–04 season was the 102nd season in the history of Norwich City, and the club's ninth consecutive season competing in the Football League First Division.

Norwich gained promotion to the FA Premier League as league champions with 94 points, finishing eight points ahead of runners-up West Bromwich Albion.

== Kit ==
Norwich maintained their kit manufacturing deal with Xara, who produced a new kit for the next two seasons.

== Players ==
=== First-team squad ===
Squad at end of season

Note: Flags indicate national team as defined under FIFA eligibility rules; some limited exceptions apply. Players may hold more than one non-FIFA nationality.

| No. | Pos. | Nation | Player |
|---|---|---|---|
| 1 | GK | (England) ENG | Robert Green |
| 2 | DF | (England) ENG | Keith Briggs |
| 3 | DF | (England) ENG | Adam Drury |
| 4 | DF | (Scotland) SCO | Malky Mackay |
| 5 | DF | (England) ENG | Craig Fleming |
| 6 | FW | (England) ENG | Darren Huckerby |
| 7 | MF | (Northern Ireland) NIR | Phil Mulryne |
| 8 | MF | (Scotland) SCO | Gary Holt |
| 9 | FW | (Wales) WAL | Iwan Roberts |
| 10 | FW | (England) ENG | Zema Abbey |
| 11 | DF | (Canada) CAN | Jim Brennan |
| 12 | GK | (England) ENG | Paul Crichton |
| 14 | FW | (England) ENG | Leon McKenzie |

| No. | Pos. | Nation | Player |
|---|---|---|---|
| 15 | MF | (England) ENG | Mark Rivers |
| 16 | MF | (England) ENG | Clint Easton |
| 17 | DF | (England) ENG | Marc Edworthy |
| 18 | FW | (Northern Ireland) NIR | Paul McVeigh |
| 19 | FW | (Sweden) SWE | Mathias Svensson |
| 20 | MF | (Jamaica) JAM | Damien Francis (Note: Francis was born in Wandsworth, England, but also qualified to represent Jamaica internationally and made his international debut for Jamaica in 2003.) |
| 21 | MF | (England) ENG | Dean Sinclair |
| 22 | FW | (England) ENG | Ian Henderson |
| 23 | FW | (England) ENG | Ryan Jarvis |
| 24 | DF | (England) ENG | Jason Shackell |
| 25 | MF | (England) ENG | Kevin Cooper (on loan from Wolverhampton Wanderers) |
| 26 | MF | (Scotland) SCO | Kevin Harper (Note: Harper was born in Oldham, England, but also qualified to represent Scotland internationally and represented them at U-21 level.) (on loan from Portsmouth) |
| 28 | GK | (England) ENG | Joe Lewis |

=== Left club during season ===
Note: Flags indicate national team as defined under FIFA eligibility rules; some limited exceptions apply. Players may hold more than one non-FIFA nationality.

| No. | Pos. | Nation | Player |
|---|---|---|---|
| 6 | FW | (Denmark) DEN | David Nielsen (to Aalborg) |
| 14 | FW | (Scotland) SCO | Alex Notman (retired) |

| No. | Pos. | Nation | Player |
|---|---|---|---|
| 19 | FW | (Ghana) GHA | Elvis Hammond (on loan from Fulham) |
| 25 | FW | (England) ENG | Peter Crouch (on loan from Aston Villa) |

== Statistics ==
=== Appearances, goals and cards ===
(Substitute appearances in brackets)

| No. | Pos. | Name | League | | FA Cup | | League Cup | | Total | |
| No. | Pos. | Name | Apps | Goals | Apps | Goals | Apps | Goals | Apps | Goals |
|---|---|---|---|---|---|---|---|---|---|---|
| 1 | GK | (England) Robert Green | 46 | 0 | 1 | 0 | 1 | 0 | 48 | 0 |
| 2 | DF | (England) Keith Briggs | 1 (2) | 0 | 0 | 0 | 0 | 0 | 1 (2) | 0 |
| 3 | DF | (England) Adam Drury | 42 | 0 | 1 | 0 | 1 | 0 | 44 | 0 |
| 4 | MF | (Scotland) Malky Mackay | 45 | 4 | 1 | 0 | 1 | 0 | 47 | 4 |
| 5 | DF | (England) Craig Fleming | 46 | 3 | 1 | 0 | 1 | 0 | 48 | 3 |
| 6 | FW | (Denmark) David Nielsen | 2 | 0 | 0 | 0 | 0 (1) | 0 | 2 (1) | 0 |
| 6* | FW | (England) Darren Huckerby | 36 | 14 | 1 | 0 | 0 | 0 | 37 | 14 |
| 7 | MF | (Northern Ireland) Philip Mulryne | 14 (20) | 3 | 0 (1) | 0 | 0 (1) | 0 | 14 (22) | 3 |
| 8 | MF | (Scotland) Gary Holt | 46 | 1 | 1 | 0 | 1 | 0 | 48 | 1 |
| 9 | FW | (Wales) Iwan Roberts | 13 (28) | 8 | 1 | 0 | 0 | 0 | 14 (28) | 8 |
| 10 | FW | (England) Zema Abbey | 1 (2) | 0 | 0 | 0 | 0 | 0 | 1 (2) | 0 |
| 11 | DF | (Canada) Jim Brennan | 7 (8) | 1 | 1 | 1 | 0 | 0 | 8 (8) | 2 |
| 14 | FW | (Scotland) Alex Notman | 0 (1) | 0 | 0 | 0 | 0 | 0 | 0 (1) | 0 |
| 14* | FW | (England) Leon McKenzie | 12 (6) | 9 | 0 | 0 | 0 | 0 | 12 (6) | 9 |
| 15 | FW | (England) Mark Rivers | 7 (5) | 4 | 0 | 0 | 1 | 0 | 8 (5) | 4 |
| 16 | MF | (England) Clint Easton | 8 (2) | 2 | 0 | 0 | 1 | 0 | 9 (2) | 2 |
| 17 | DF | (England) Marc Edworthy | 42 (1) | 0 | 1 | 0 | 1 | 0 | 44 (1) | 0 |
| 18 | FW | (Northern Ireland) Paul McVeigh | 36 (8) | 5 | 1 | 0 | 0 (1) | 0 | 37 (9) | 5 |
| 19 | FW | (Ghana) Elvis Hammond | 0 (4) | 0 | 0 | 0 | 0 | 0 | 0 (4) | 0 |
| 19* | FW | (Sweden) Mathias Svensson | 16 (4) | 7 | 0 | 0 | 0 | 0 | 16 (4) | 7 |
| 20 | MF | (Jamaica) Damien Francis | 39 (2) | 7 | 0 | 0 | 0 | 0 | 41 (2) | 7 |
| 22 | FW | (England) Ian Henderson | 14 (5) | 4 | 0 (1) | 0 | 1 | 0 | 15 (6) | 4 |
| 23 | FW | (England) Ryan Jarvis | 0 (12) | 1 | 0 (1) | 0 | 1 | 0 | 1 (13) | 1 |
| 24 | DF | (England) Jason Shackell | 4 (2) | 0 | 0 | 0 | 0 | 0 | 4 (2) | 0 |
| 25 | FW | (England) Peter Crouch | 14 (1) | 4 | 0 | 0 | 0 | 0 | 14 (1) | 4 |
| 25* | MF | (England) Kevin Cooper | 0 | 0 | 0 | 0 | 0 | 0 | 0 | 0 |
| 26 | MF | (England) Kevin Harper | 9 | 0 | 0 | 0 | 0 | 0 | 9 | 0 |

* indicates number taken from departed player

== Competitions ==
Win Draw Loss

=== League ===
| Round | 1 | 2 | 3 | 4 | 5 | 6 | 7 | 8 | 9 | 10 | 11 | 12 | 13 | 14 | 15 | 16 | 17 | 18 | 19 | 20 | 21 | 22 | 23 |
|---|---|---|---|---|---|---|---|---|---|---|---|---|---|---|---|---|---|---|---|---|---|---|---|
| Result | 2–2 | 2–0 | 0–1 | 3–2 | 0–2 | 2–0 | 2–1 | 1–1 | 2–1 | 2–1 | 1–1 | 1–1 | 0–1 | 2–1 | 1–0 | 3–1 | 3–1 | 1–2 | 0–0 | 1–1 | 1–0 | 0–0 | 4–1 |
| Position | 9 | 7 | 10 | 7 | 12 | 10 | 7 | 8 | 4 | 4 | 6 | 6 | 8 | 7 | 3 | 3 | 3 | 3 | 2 | 2 | 2 | 2 | 2 |

| Round | 24 | 25 | 26 | 27 | 28 | 29 | 30 | 31 | 32 | 33 | 34 | 35 | 36 | 37 | 38 | 39 | 40 | 41 | 42 | 43 | 44 | 45 | 46 |
|---|---|---|---|---|---|---|---|---|---|---|---|---|---|---|---|---|---|---|---|---|---|---|---|
| Result | 2–0 | 1–0 | 4–0 | 0–1 | 4–4 | 1–0 | 1–0 | 2–0 | 1–1 | 0–0 | 3–1 | 1–2 | 3–0 | 0–1 | 1–0 | 5–3 | 2–0 | 1–0 | 5–0 | 2–1 | 3–2 | 0–1 | 3–1 |
| Position | 1 | 1 | 1 | 1 | 1 | 1 | 1 | 1 | 1 | 1 | 1 | 1 | 1 | 1 | 1 | 1 | 1 | 1 | 1 | 1 | 1 | 1 | 1 |

==== August ====
| 9 August 2003 | Bradford City | 2 – 2 | Norwich City | Bradford, West Yorkshire |
| 15:00 BST | Muirhead 84'; Branch 90' | Report | Rivers 44' (pen.); Easton 47' | Stadium: Valley Parade; Attendance: 13,159; Referee: Scott Mathieson |

| 16 August 2003 | Norwich City | 2 – 0 | Rotherham United | Norwich, Norfolk |
| 15:00 BST | Rivers 9'; Easton 30' | Report | McIntosh (yellow card) 21' (yellow-red card) 66' | Stadium: Carrow Road; Attendance: 16,263; Referee: Neale Barry |

| 23 August 2003 | Sheffield United | 1 – 0 | Norwich City | Sheffield, South Yorkshire |
| 15:00 BST | Page 23' | Report | | Stadium: Bramall Lane; Attendance: 24,285; Referee: Chris Foy |

| 26 August 2003 | Norwich City | 3 – 2 | Wimbledon | Norwich, Norfolk |
| 19:45 BST | Francis 10'; Rivers 27' (pen.), 56' | Report | Holdsworth 84'; Hawkins (red card) 85'; Leigertwood 90' | Stadium: Carrow Road; Attendance: 16,082; Referee: Phil Prosser |

| 30 August 2003 | Nottingham Forest | 2 – 0 | Norwich City | Nottingham, Nottinghamshire |
| 17:35 BST | Johnson 30'; Harewood 51' (pen.) | Report | | Stadium: City Ground; Attendance: 21,058; Referee: Lee Cable |

==== September ====
| 13 September 2003 | Norwich City | 2 – 0 | Burnley | Norwich, Norfolk |
| 15:00 BST | Crouch 58'; Roberts 90' | Report | | Stadium: Carrow Road; Attendance: 16,407; Referee: Clive Penton |

| 16 September 2003 | Gillingham | 1 – 2 | Norwich City | Gillingham, Kent |
| 19:45 BST | King 40' | Report | Francis 28'; Crouch 67' | Stadium: Priestfield Stadium; Attendance: 8,022; Referee: Graham Barber |

| 20 September 2003 | Stoke City | 1 – 1 | Norwich City | Stoke-on-Trent, Staffordshire |
| 17:35 BST | Noel-Williams 36' | Report | Huckerby 67' | Stadium: Britannia Stadium; Attendance: 10,672; Referee: Phil Joslin |

| 27 September 2003 | Norwich City | 2 – 1 | Crystal Palace | Norwich, Norfolk |
| 15:00 BST | Huckerby 38' (pen.); Mackay 89' | Report | Derry 2' | Stadium: Carrow Road; Attendance: 16,425; Referee: Brian Curson |

| 30 September 2003 | Norwich City | 2 – 1 | Reading | Norwich, Norfolk |
| 19:45 BST | Huckerby 17'; McVeigh 87' | Report | Forster 25' | Stadium: Carrow Road; Attendance: 16,387; Referee: Keith Hill |

==== October ====
| 4 October 2003 | Wigan Athletic | 1 – 1 | Norwich City | Wigan, Greater Manchester |
| 15:00 BST | Liddell 25' | Report | Roberts 63' | Stadium: JJB Stadium; Attendance: 9,346; Referee: Roy Pearson |

| 15 October 2003 | West Ham United | 1 – 1 | Norwich City | Upton Park, London |
| 19:45 BST | Edworthy 6' (o.g.) | Report | Crouch 63' | Stadium: Boleyn Ground; Attendance: 31,308; Referee: Steve Tomlin |

| 18 October 2003 | West Bromwich Albion | 1 – 0 | Norwich City | West Bromwich, West Midlands |
| 15:00 BST | Koumas 35' | Report | | Stadium: The Hawthorns; Attendance: 24,966; Referee: Graham Salisbury |

| 21 October 2003 | Norwich City | 2 – 1 | Derby County | Norwich, Norfolk |
| 19:45 BST | Harper (red card) 45'; Roberts 81' (pen.); Mulryne 90' | Report | Taylor 61' (pen.) | Stadium: Carrow Road; Attendance: 16,346; Referee: Richard Beeby |

| 25 October 2003 | Norwich City | 1 – 0 | Sunderland | Norwich, Norfolk |
| 15:00 BST | Francis 33' | Report | Oster (red card) 70' | Stadium: Carrow Road; Attendance: 16,427; Referee: Graham Poll |

==== November ====
| 1 November 2003 | Walsall | 1 – 3 | Norwich City | Walsall, West Midlands |
| 15:00 GMT | Birch 10'; Ritchie (yellow card) 23' (yellow-red card) 89' | Report | Henderson 52'; McVeigh 60'; Crouch 64' (yellow card) 47' (yellow-red card) 89' | Stadium: Bescot Stadium; Attendance: 8,331; Referee: Mark Cowburn |

| 8 November 2003 | Norwich City | 3 – 1 | Millwall | Norwich, Norfolk |
| 15:00 GMT | McVeigh 12'; Henderson 15', 30' | Report | Ward 90' | Stadium: Carrow Road; Attendance: 16,423; Referee: Mark Clattenburg |

| 15 November 2003 | Norwich City | 1 – 2 | Watford | Norwich, Norfolk |
| 15:00 GMT | Jarvis 88' | Report | Fitzgerald 24'; Cox 81' (pen.) | Stadium: Carrow Road; Attendance: 16,420; Referee: Steve Bennett |

| 22 November 2003 | Preston North End | 0 – 0 | Norwich City | Preston, Lancashire |
| 15:00 GMT | | Report | | Stadium: Deepdale; Attendance: 14,775; Referee: Joe Ross |

| 25 November 2003 | Norwich City | 1 – 1 | Coventry City | Norwich, Norfolk |
| 19:45 GMT | Henderson 35'; Mackay (yellow card) 72' (yellow-red card) 78' | Report | McAllister 49' (pen.) | Stadium: Carrow Road; Attendance: 16,414; Referee: Paul Taylor |

| 29 November 2003 | Norwich City | 1 – 0 | Crewe Alexandra | Norwich, Norfolk |
| 15:00 GMT | Huckerby 39' | Report | | Stadium: Carrow Road; Attendance: 16,367; Referee: Andy Penn |

==== December ====
| 6 December 2003 | Millwall | 0 – 0 | Norwich City | Bermondsey, London |
| 15:00 GMT | Muscat (yellow card) 48' (yellow-red card) 81' | Report | | Stadium: The Den; Attendance: 9,850; Referee: Mike Thorpe |

| 13 December 2003 | Norwich City | 4 – 1 | Cardiff City | Norwich, Norfolk |
| 15:00 GMT | Huckerby 34'; Roberts 54'; Fleming 71'; Vidmar 79' (o.g.) | Report | Thorne 59' | Stadium: Carrow Road; Attendance: 16,428; Referee: Alan Butler |

| 21 December 2003 | Ipswich Town | 0 – 2 | Norwich City | Ipswich, Suffolk |
| 12:00 GMT | | Report | McKenzie 37', 76' | Stadium: Portman Road; Attendance: 30,152; Referee: Alan Kaye |

| 26 December 2003 | Norwich City | 1 – 0 | Nottingham Forest | Norwich, Norfolk |
| 17:35 GMT | Svensson 14' | Report | | Stadium: Carrow Road; Attendance: 16,429; Referee: Keith Hill |

| 28 December 2003 | Derby County | 0 – 4 | Norwich City | Derby, Derbyshire |
| 15:00 GMT | | Report | Fleming 51'; Mackay 78'; McVeigh 81'; McKenzie 88' (pen.) | Stadium: Pride Park Stadium; Attendance: 23,783; Referee: Graham Laws |

==== January ====
| 10 January 2004 | Norwich City | 0 – 1 | Bradford City | Norwich, Norfolk |
| 15:00 GMT | | Report | Armstrong 45' | Stadium: Carrow Road; Attendance: 16,360; Referee: Kevin Friend |

| 17 January 2004 | Rotherham United | 4 – 4 | Norwich City | Rotherham, South Yorkshire |
| 15:00 GMT | Butler 28', 42', 65'; Branston (red card) 45'; Mullin 75' | Report | Roberts 29'; McKenzie 33'; Huckerby 45' (pen.); Francis 89' | Stadium: Millmoor; Attendance: 7,448; Referee: Mike Jones |

| 31 January 2004 | Norwich City | 1 – 0 | Sheffield United | Norwich, Norfolk |
| 15:00 GMT | Roberts 59' | Report | | Stadium: Carrow Road; Attendance: 18,977; Referee: Barry Knight |

==== February ====
| 7 February 2004 | Wimbledon | 0 – 1 | Norwich City | Milton Keynes, Buckinghamshire |
| 15:00 GMT | Banks (red card) 82'; Williams (red card) 83' | Report | Huckerby 9' | Stadium: National Hockey Stadium; Attendance: 7,368; Referee: Michael Ryan |

| 14 February 2004 | Coventry City | 0 – 2 | Norwich City | Coventry, West Midlands |
| 15:00 GMT | | Report | Holt 38'; Brennan 85' | Stadium: Highfield Road; Attendance: 15,757; Referee: Paul Robinson |

| 21 February 2004 | Norwich City | 1 – 1 | West Ham United | Norwich, Norfolk |
| 15:00 GMT | Huckerby 76' | Report | Harewood 61'; Etherington (yellow card) 55' (yellow-red card) 87' | Stadium: Carrow Road; Attendance: 23,940; Referee: Ray Olivier |

==== March ====
| 2 March 2004 | Norwich City | 0 – 0 | West Bromwich Albion | Norwich, Norfolk |
| 19:45 GMT | | Report | | Stadium: Carrow Road; Attendance: 23,223; Referee: Brian Curson |

| 7 March 2004 | Norwich City | 3 – 1 | Ipswich Town | Norwich, Norfolk |
| 12:00 GMT | Mackay 50', 59'; Santos 89' (o.g.) | Report | Diallo (red card) 76'; Miller 88' | Stadium: Carrow Road; Attendance: 23,942; Referee: Mark Clattenburg |

| 13 March 2004 | Cardiff City | 2 – 1 | Norwich City | Cardiff, Wales |
| 15:00 GMT | Parry 17'; Earnshaw 20' | Report | McKenzie 55' | Stadium: Ninian Park; Attendance: 16,317; Referee: Jeff Winter |

| 16 March 2004 | Norwich City | 3 – 0 | Gillingham | Norwich, Norfolk |
| 19:45 GMT | Pouton 63' (o.g.); Mulryne 65'; McVeigh 67' | Report | Ashby (red card) 26' | Stadium: Carrow Road; Attendance: 23,198; Referee: Anthony Bates |

| 20 March 2004 | Crystal Palace | 1 – 0 | Norwich City | South Norwood, London |
| 15:00 GMT | Routledge 41' | Report | | Stadium: Selhurst Park; Attendance: 23,798; Referee: Paul Durkin |

| 27 March 2004 | Norwich City | 1 – 0 | Stoke City | Norwich, Norfolk |
| 15:00 GMT | Svensson 45' | Report | | Stadium: Carrow Road; Attendance: 23,565; Referee: Mike Riley |

==== April ====
| 3 April 2004 | Burnley | 3 – 5 | Norwich City | Burnley, Lancashire |
| 15:00 BST | Wood 7'; May 30'; Blake 38' | Report | Svensson 14', 62'; Huckerby 32', 89'; McKenzie 51' | Stadium: Turf Moor; Attendance: 12,417; Referee: Andy Hall |

| 9 April 2004 | Norwich City | 2 – 0 | Wigan Athletic | Norwich, Norfolk |
| 17:30 BST | Svensson 55'; Huckerby 72' | Report | | Stadium: Carrow Road; Attendance: 20,669; Referee: Paul Armstrong |

| 12 April 2004 | Reading | 0 – 1 | Norwich City | Reading, Berkshire |
| 17:35 BST | | Report | Mulryne 86' | Stadium: Madejski Stadium; Attendance: 18,460; Referee: Neale Barry |

| 17 April 2004 | Norwich City | 5 – 0 | Walsall | Norwich, Norfolk |
| 15:00 BST | Francis 2'; McKenzie 45'; Svensson 51', 86'; Huckerby 73' | Report | | Stadium: Carrow Road; Attendance: 23,558; Referee: Mike Pike |

| 24 April 2004 | Watford | 1 – 2 | Norwich City | Watford, Hertfordshire |
| 15:00 BST | Blizzard 78' | Report | Francis 29'; McKenzie 48' | Stadium: Vicarage Road; Attendance: 19,290; Referee: Mick Feltcher |

==== May ====
| 1 May 2004 | Norwich City | 3 – 2 | Preston North End | Norwich, Norfolk |
| 15:00 BST | McKenzie 2'; Francis 28'; Huckerby 84' | Report | McKenna 5'; Healy 48'; Broomes (yellow card) 45' (yellow-red card) 69' | Stadium: Carrow Road; Attendance: 23,673; Referee: Iain Williamson |

| 4 May 2004 | Sunderland | 1 – 0 | Norwich City | Sunderland, Tyne and Wear |
| 20:00 BST | Robinson 44' | Report | | Stadium: Stadium of Light; Attendance: 35,174; Referee: David Pugh |

| 9 May 2004 | Crewe Alexandra | 1 – 3 | Norwich City | Crewe, Cheshire |
| 13:00 BST | Ashton 82' | Report | Fleming 28'; Roberts 31', 88' (pen.) | Stadium: Alexandra Stadium; Attendance: 9,833; Referee: Paul Taylor |

=== FA Cup ===
| Round | 3 |
|---|---|
| Result | 1–3 |

| 3 January 2004 Round 3 | Everton | 3 – 1 | Norwich City | Liverpool, Merseyside |
| 15:00 GMT | Kilbane 15'; Ferguson 38' (pen.), 70' (pen.) | (Report) | Brennan 27' | Stadium: Goodison Park; Attendance: 29,955; Referee: Matt Messias |

=== League Cup ===
| Round | 1 |
|---|---|
| Result | 0–1 |

| 12 August 2003 Round 1 | Northampton Town | 1 – 0 | Norwich City | Northampton, Northamptonshire |
| 19:45 BST | Low 8' | (Report) | | Stadium: Sixfields Stadium; Attendance: 5,476; Referee: Ray Olivier |

== Final league table ==
| Pos | Team | Pld | W | D | L | GF | GA | GD | Pts | Promotion, qualification or relegation |
|---|---|---|---|---|---|---|---|---|---|---|
| 1 | Norwich City (C, P) | 46 | 28 | 10 | 8 | 79 | 39 | +40 | 94 | Promotion to the FA Premier League |
| 2 | West Bromwich Albion (P) | 46 | 25 | 11 | 10 | 64 | 42 | +22 | 86 | Promotion to the FA Premier League |
| 3 | Sunderland | 46 | 22 | 13 | 11 | 62 | 45 | +17 | 79 | Qualification for the First Division play-offs |
| 4 | West Ham United | 46 | 19 | 17 | 10 | 67 | 45 | +22 | 74 | Qualification for the First Division play-offs |
| 5 | Ipswich Town | 46 | 21 | 10 | 15 | 84 | 72 | +12 | 73 | Qualification for the First Division play-offs |

Source: Soccerway
Rules for classification: 1) points; 2) goal difference; 3) number of goals scored.
(C) Champions; (P) Promoted
