= 2002–03 Norwich City F.C. season =

Norwich City
2002–03 season
- Chairman: Roger Munby
- Manager: Nigel Worthington
- Stadium: Carrow Road
- First Division: 8th
- FA Cup: Fifth round
- League Cup: First round
- Top goalscorer: League: McVeigh (14); All: McVeigh (15)
- Average home league attendance: 20,353
Home colours	Away colours

During the 2002–03 English football season, Norwich City competed in the Football League First Division.

== Season summary ==
In the 2002–03 season, the Canaries made an impressive start with just one defeat in their first 14 league games, picking up 29 points from the possible 42 which saw them amongst the candidates for promotion but an inconsistent run towards the end of the season saw Norwich miss out on a play-off spot after only 7 league wins at the end of Christmas.

== Final league table ==
Pos	Team	Pld	W	D	L	GF	GA	GD	Pts	Promotion or relegation
6	Nottingham Forest	46	20	14	12	82	50	+32	74	Qualification for First Division Playoffs
7	Ipswich Town	46	19	13	14	80	64	+16	70	
8	Norwich City	46	19	12	15	60	49	+11	69	
9	Millwall	46	19	9	18	59	69	−10	66	
10	Wimbledon	46	18	11	17	76	73	+3	65	

Updated to match(es) played on 11 May 2003. Source: Soccerway
Rules for classification: 1) points; 2) goal difference; 3) number of goals scored.

== Results ==
Norwich City's score comes first

=== Legend ===
Win	Draw	Loss

=== Football League First Division ===
Date	Opponent	Venue	Result	Attendance	Scorers
10 August 2002	Grimsby Town	H	4–0	19,869	Mulryne (2), McVeigh (2)
13 August 2002	Rotherham United	A	1–1	7,687	Nielsen
17 August 2002	Brighton & Hove Albion	A	2–0	6,730	McVeigh, Easton
24 August 2002	Gillingham	H	1–0	20,588	McVeigh
26 August 2002	Stoke City	A	1–1	13,931	Drury
31 August 2002	Watford	H	4–0	20,563	McVeigh, Roberts, Mulryne, Nielsen
7 September 2002	Sheffield United	H	2–3	20,074	McVeigh, Mackay
15 September 2002	Ipswich Town	A	1–1	29,112	Mackay
18 September 2002	Reading	A	2–0	14,335	McVeigh, Mulryne
21 September 2002	Portsmouth	H	1–0	21,335	Roberts
28 September 2002	Preston North End	A	2–1	13,550	Nielsen, McVeigh
5 October 2002	Leicester City	H	0–0	20,952	
19 October 2002	Millwall	H	3–1	20,448	Nielsen (2), Kenton
23 October 2002	Coventry City	A	1–1	16,409	McVeigh
26 October 2002	Bradford City	A	1–2	12,888	Abbey
29 October 2002	Nottingham Forest	H	0–0	20,986	
2 November 2002	Wimbledon	A	2–4	3,908	Henderson, Nielsen
9 November 2002	Sheffield Wednesday	H	3–0	20,667	Roberts (2, 1 pen), McVeigh
16 November 2002	Crystal Palace	H	2–0	20,907	McVeigh, Roberts
23 November 2002	Burnley	A	0–2	16,282	
30 November 2002	Derby County	H	1–0	20,522	Mackay
7 December 2002	Wolverhampton Wanderers	A	0–1	25,753	
14 December 2002	Crystal Palace	A	0–2	16,791	
21 December 2002	Walsall	H	2–1	19,872	Mackay, Mulryne
26 December 2002	Brighton & Hove Albion	H	0–1	20,687	
28 December 2002	Grimsby Town	A	1–1	8,306	Abbey
11 January 2003	Rotherham United	H	1–1	19,452	McVeigh
19 January 2003	Watford	A	1–2	13,338	Cox (own goal)
1 February 2003	Stoke City	H	2–2	20,186	Roberts, Mackay
8 February 2003	Sheffield Wednesday	A	2–2	19,114	Healy, Roberts
22 February 2003	Sheffield United	A	1–0	19,020	McVeigh
25 February 2003	Gillingham	A	0–1	7,935	
2 March 2003	Ipswich Town	H	0–2	21,243	
5 March 2003	Reading	H	0–1	18,970	
12 March 2003	Portsmouth	A	2–3	19,221	Easton, Rivers
15 March 2003	Coventry City	H	2–0	20,099	Nedergaard, Drury
18 March 2003	Millwall	A	2–0	6,854	Mackay, Abbey
22 March 2003	Nottingham Forest	A	0–4	27,296	
25 March 2003	Wimbledon	H	1–0	21,059	Healy
29 March 2003	Bradford City	H	3–2	18,536	Rivers (2, 1 pen), Abbey
5 April 2003	Derby County	A	1–2	23,643	McVeigh
12 April 2003	Burnley	H	2–0	20,026	Nedergaard, Abbey
19 April 2003	Walsall	A	0–0	7,018	
21 April 2003	Wolverhampton Wanderers	H	0–3	20,843	
27 April 2003	Leicester City	A	1–1	31,639	Rivers
4 May 2003	Preston North End	H	2–0	20,232	Mears (own goal), Mulryne

=== FA Cup ===
Round	Date	Opponent	Venue	Result	Attendance	Goalscorers
R3	14 January 2003	Brighton & Hove Albion	H	3–1	17,205	Mulryne (2), McVeigh
R4	25 January 2003	Dagenham & Redbridge	H	1–0	21,164	Abbey
R5	15 February 2003	Southampton	A	0–2	31,103	

=== League Cup ===
Round	Date	Opponent	Venue	Result	Attendance	Goalscorers
R1	10 September 2002	Cheltenham Town	H	0–3	13,285	

== Players ==
=== First-team squad ===
Squad at end of season

Note: Flags indicate national team as defined under FIFA eligibility rules; some limited exceptions apply. Players may hold more than one non-FIFA nationality.

No.	Pos.	Nation	Player
1	GK	(England) ENG	Robert Green
2	DF	(England) ENG	Darren Kenton
3	DF	(England) ENG	Adam Drury
4	DF	(Scotland) SCO	Malky Mackay
5	DF	(England) ENG	Craig Fleming
6	FW	(Denmark) DEN	David Nielsen
7	MF	(Northern Ireland) NIR	Phil Mulryne
8	MF	(Scotland) SCO	Gary Holt
9	FW	(Wales) WAL	Iwan Roberts
10	FW	(England) ENG	Zema Abbey
11	MF	(Scotland) SCO	Chris Llewellyn
14	FW	(Scotland) SCO	Alex Notman
15	FW	(Northern Ireland) NIR	David Healy (on loan from Preston North End)
16	DF	(Denmark) DEN	Steen Nedergaard

No.	Pos.	Nation	Player
17	MF	(England) ENG	Dean Sinclair
18	FW	(Northern Ireland) NIR	Paul McVeigh
19	DF	(England) ENG	Keith Briggs
20	DF	(England) ENG	Paul Heckingbottom
21	MF	(England) ENG	Darel Russell
22	FW	(England) ENG	Ian Henderson
23	FW	(England) ENG	Ryan Jarvis
24	MF	(England) ENG	Clint Easton
25	DF	(England) ENG	Jason Shackell
26	DF	(England) ENG	Damian Batt
27	MF	(England) ENG	Mark Rivers
28	GK	(England) ENG	Paul Crichton
30	GK	(England) ENG	Aaron Osborne

=== Left club during season ===
Note: Flags indicate national team as defined under FIFA eligibility rules; some limited exceptions apply. Players may hold more than one non-FIFA nationality.

No.	Pos.	Nation	Player
12	MF	(England) ENG	Neil Emblen (to Walsall)
13	GK	(England) ENG	Arran Lee-Barrett (to Cardiff City)
15	DF	(Republic of Ireland) IRL	Brian McGovern (to Peterborough United)
17	DF	(England) ENG	Daryl Sutch (to Southend United)
19	FW	(France) FRA	Marc Libbra (to US Créteil-Lusitanos)

No.	Pos.	Nation	Player
19	MF	(England) ENG	Nicky Southall (on loan from Bolton Wanderers)
29	DF	(England) ENG	Leigh Bromby (on loan from Sheffield Wednesday)
30	FW	(England) ENG	Paul Hayes (to Scunthorpe United)
—	FW	(England) ENG	Danny Bloomfield (to AFC Bournemouth)
