= List of English football transfers summer 2005 =

This is a list of English football transfers for the 2005–06 season. Only moves featuring at least one Premier League or Championship club are listed.

The summer transfer window opened on 1 July 2005, although a few transfers took place prior to that date. Players without a club could join one at any time, either during or in between transfer windows. Clubs below Premier League level could also sign players on loan at any time. If need be, clubs could sign a goalkeeper on an emergency loan, if all others were unavailable. The window re-opened on 1 January 2006 for one month until 00:00 GMT on 1 February 2006.

== Summer transfer window ==
=== May ===
Date	Name	Moving From	Moving To	Fee
16 May 2005	Paul Stalteri	(Germany) Werder Bremen	Tottenham Hotspur	free
17 May 2005	Patrik Berger	Portsmouth	Aston Villa	free
20 May 2005	Aaron Hughes	Newcastle United	Aston Villa	£1m
26 May 2005	Simon Davies	Tottenham Hotspur	Everton	£4m
30 May 2005	Edu	Arsenal	(Spain) Valencia CF	free

=== June ===
Date	Name	Moving From	Moving To	Fee
1 June 2005	Darren Bent	Ipswich Town	Charlton Athletic	£2.5m
3 June 2005	Patrick Kluivert	Newcastle United	(Spain) Valencia CF	free (finalized on 20 June)
5 June 2005	Edwin van der Sar	Fulham	Manchester United	Undisclosed
7 June 2005	Kevin Doyle	(Republic of Ireland) Cork City	Reading	€117, 000 (£78, 000)
10 June 2005	Mikael Forssell	Chelsea	Birmingham City	£3m
13 June 2005	Andy O'Brien	Newcastle United	Portsmouth	£2m
13 June 2005	Vladimír Šmicer	Liverpool	(France) FC Girondins de Bordeaux	free
13 June 2005	Jonathan Stead	Blackburn Rovers	Sunderland	£1.8m
14 June 2005	Kelvin Davis	Ipswich Town	Sunderland	£1.25m
14 June 2005	Laurent Robert	Newcastle United	Portsmouth	season-long loan
15 June 2005	Scott Parker	Chelsea	Newcastle United	£6.5m
16 June 2005	El Hadji Diouf	Liverpool	Bolton Wanderers	Undisclosed (making a previous loan deal permanent)
21 June 2005	Asier del Horno	(Spain) Athletic Bilbao	Chelsea	£8m
22 June 2005	Park Ji-Sung	(Netherlands) PSV Eindhoven	Manchester United	£4m
27 June 2005	Alexander Hleb	(Germany) VfB Stuttgart	Arsenal	£6m
27 June 2005	Heiðar Helguson	Watford	Fulham	£1.3m
27 June 2005	Per Krøldrup	(Italy) Udinese	Everton	£5m
28 June 2005	Emanuel Pogatetz	(Germany) Bayer Leverkusen	Middlesbrough	£1.8m
29 June 2005	Mateja Kežman	Chelsea	(Spain) Atlético Madrid	£5.3m
29 June 2005	Kevin Phillips	Southampton	Aston Villa	£1m

=== July ===
Date	Name	Moving From	Moving To	Fee
4 July 2005	Darren Carter	Birmingham City	West Bromwich Albion	£1.5m
4 July 2005	Boudewijn Zenden	Middlesbrough	Liverpool	free
5 July 2005	Paul Konchesky	Charlton Athletic	West Ham United	Undisclosed
7 July 2005	Craig Bellamy	Newcastle United	Blackburn Rovers	£5m
7 July 2005	Jhon Viáfara	(Colombia) Once Caldas	Portsmouth	£1.6m
7 July 2005	Yakubu	Portsmouth	Middlesbrough	£7.5m
14 July 2005	Emre Belözoğlu	(Italy) Inter Milan	Newcastle United	£4m
14 July 2005	Patrick Vieira	Arsenal	(Italy) Juventus	£13.7m
14 July 2005	Leroy Lita	Bristol City	Reading	£1m
15 July 2005	Jared Borgetti	(Mexico) C.F. Pachuca	Bolton Wanderers	£1.5m
16 July 2005	Yossi Benayoun	(Spain) Racing de Santander	West Ham United	£2.5m
18 July 2005	Shaun Wright-Phillips	Manchester City	Chelsea	£21m
20 July 2005	Andy Cole	Fulham	Manchester City	free
20 July 2005	Peter Crouch	Southampton	Liverpool	£7m
22 July 2005	Sander Westerveld	(Spain) RCD Mallorca	Portsmouth	free
26 July 2005	Diomansy Kamara	(Italy) Modena	West Bromwich Albion	£1.5m
27 July 2005	Darius Vassell	Aston Villa	Manchester City	£2m

=== August ===
Date	Name	Moving From	Moving To	Fee
3 August 2005	Edgar Davids	(Italy) Inter Milan	Tottenham Hotspur	free
4 August 2005	Phil Neville	Manchester United	Everton	undisclosed fee (over £3m, some reports say over £5m)
5 August 2005	Damien Francis	Norwich City	Wigan Athletic	undisclosed fee
5 August 2005	Walter Pandiani	(Spain) Deportivo de La Coruña	Birmingham City	£3m (making a previous loan deal permanent)
6 August 2005	Henri Camara	Wolverhampton Wanderers	Wigan Athletic	£3m
8 August 2005	José Kleberson	Manchester United	(Turkey) Beşiktaş J.K.	£2.5m
11 August 2005	Andy Gray	Sheffield United	Sunderland	£1.1m
15 August 2005	Nathan Ellington	Wigan Athletic	West Bromwich Albion	£3m
16 August 2005	Hidetoshi Nakata	(Italy) ACF Fiorentina	Bolton Wanderers	season-long loan
17 August 2005	Frédéric Kanouté	Tottenham Hotspur	(Spain) Sevilla FC	£4.4m
17 August 2005	David Bellion	Manchester United	West Ham United	season-long loan
19 August 2005	Michael Essien	(France) Olympique Lyonnais	Chelsea	£24.4m
22 August 2005	Brian Priske	(Belgium) K.R.C. Genk	Portsmouth	Undisclosed
22 August 2005	Jiri Jarosik	Chelsea	Birmingham City	season-long loan
23 August 2005	Milan Baroš	Liverpool	Aston Villa	£6.5m
25 August 2005	Clinton Morrison	Birmingham City	Crystal Palace	£2m
26 August 2005	Albert Luque	(Spain) Deportivo de La Coruña	Newcastle United	£9.5m
27 August 2005	Tiago Mendes	Chelsea	(France) Olympique Lyonnais	£6.5m
28 August 2005	Nuno Valente	(Portugal) FC Porto	Everton	£1.5m
30 August 2005	Wilfred Bouma	(Netherlands) PSV Eindhoven	Aston Villa	£3.5m
31 August 2005	David Connolly	Leicester City	Wigan Athletic	£2m
31 August 2005	Curtis Davies	Luton Town	West Bromwich Albion	£3m
31 August 2005	Salif Diao	Liverpool	Portsmouth	season-long loan
31 August 2005	Francis Jeffers	Charlton Athletic	(Scotland) Rangers	six-month loan
31 August 2005	Jermaine Jenas	Newcastle United	Tottenham Hotspur	£7m
31 August 2005	Lee Yong-Pyo	(Netherlands) PSV Eindhoven	Tottenham Hotspur	Undisclosed
31 August 2005	Michael Owen	(Spain) Real Madrid	Newcastle United	£17m
31 August 2005	Mart Poom	Sunderland	Arsenal	six-month loan
31 August 2005	Michael Reiziger	Middlesbrough	(Netherlands) PSV Eindhoven	free
31 August 2005	Nolberto Solano	Aston Villa	Newcastle United	£1.5m
31 August 2005	James Milner	Newcastle United	Aston Villa	season-long loan
31 August 2005	Andy van der Meyde	(Italy) Inter Milan	Everton	Undisclosed
31 August 2005	Iain Hume	Tranmere Rovers	Leicester City	£500k
31 August 2005	Elvis Hammond	Fulham	Leicester City	£250k
