= Steen Nedergaard =

Danish footballer

Personal information
- Date of birth: 25 February 1970 (age 56)
- Position: Defender

Team information
- Current team: FC Nordsjælland (chief scout)

Youth career
- Vigerslev IF
- Dalum IF

Senior career*
Years	Team	Apps	(Gls)
1987–2000	Odense BK		
2000–2003	Norwich City	90	(5)
2003–2004	Odense BK		
2004–2006	Hvidovre IF		

International career
1990–1992	Denmark U21	14	(0)

Managerial career
- 2005–2006: Hvidovre IF (playing manager)
- 2011–2013: OB (chief scout)
- 2014–: FC Nordsjælland (chief scout)
- * Club domestic league appearances and goals

Steen Nedergaard (born 25 February 1970) is a Danish former professional footballer who played as a full-back.

Nedergaard spent the majority of his career in Denmark with Odense BK. He gained 14 caps for the Danish under-21 national side, and was lauded as 1990 Danish under-21 Player of the Year. In the summer of 2000, he signed a three-year contract with Norwich City F.C. in England. His first season was wrecked by injuries, however in his second season he found good form and came second in the vote for Norwich City player of the year. The team reached the final of the English Division One play-offs, however Nedergaard missed the play-off matches after suffering another injury.

At the end of his third season in England, Nedergaard opted to return to Denmark and signed again for Odense BK. He maintained connections with Norwich City and was instrumental in persuading compatriot Thomas Helveg to return to Odense in the summer of 2004.

From 2005 to 2006 he was the manager of Hvidovre IF.

== Other sources ==
- Mark Davage; John Eastwood; Kevin Platt (2001). Canary Citizens. Jarrold Publishing. ISBN 0-7117-2020-7.
