= Ryan Jarvis =

English association football player

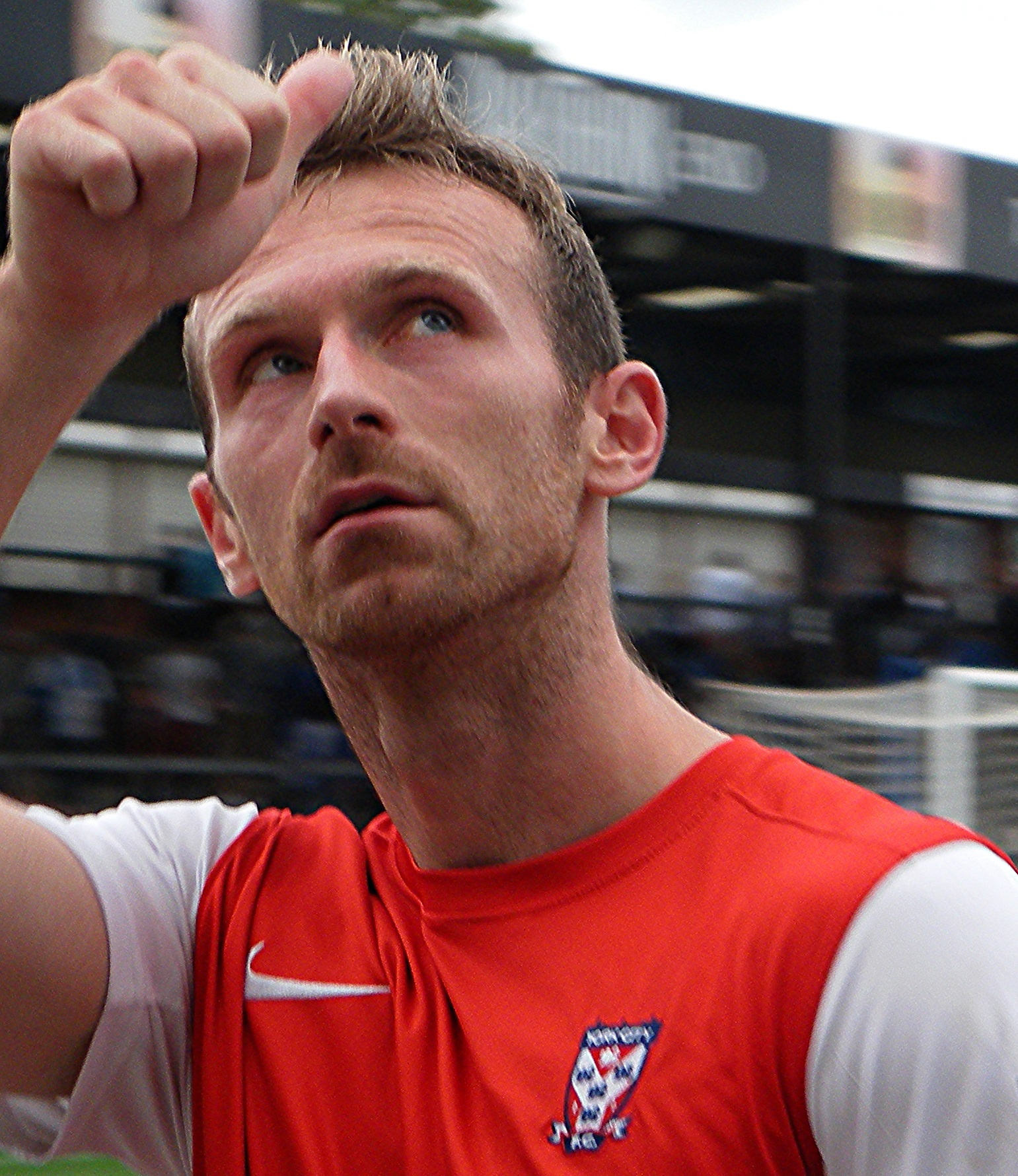
- Jarvis playing for York City in 2013

Personal information
- Full name: Ryan Robert Jarvis
- Date of birth: 11 July 1986 (age 40)
- Place of birth: Fakenham, England
- Height: 1.80 m (5 ft 11 in)
- Positions: Midfielder; forward

Team information
- Current team: Leiston

Youth career
- –2003: Norwich City

Senior career*
Years	Team	Apps	(Gls)
2003–2008	Norwich City	29	(3)
2005	→ Colchester United (loan)	6	(0)
2007	→ Leyton Orient (loan)	14	(6)
2007–2008	→ Kilmarnock (loan)	9	(1)
2008	→ Notts County (loan)	17	(2)
2008–2011	Leyton Orient	84	(10)
2010–2011	→ Northampton Town (loan)	3	(0)
2011–2012	Walsall	19	(2)
2012	→ Torquay United (loan)	14	(2)
2012–2013	Torquay United	38	(7)
2013–2015	York City	43	(8)
2015	→ Aldershot Town (loan)	12	(1)
2015–2017	Lowestoft Town	56	(9)
2017–2021	King's Lynn Town	111	(2)
2021–2022	Lowestoft Town	38	(5)
2022–	Leiston	54	(2)

International career
2001–2002	England U16	6	(3)
2002–2003	England U17	16	(6)
2004–2005	England U19	15	(2)
- * Club domestic league appearances and goals as of 22:00, 22 June 2022 (UTC)

Ryan Robert Jarvis (born 11 July 1986) is an English footballer who plays as a midfielder for Leiston. He began his career with Norwich City, becoming the club's youngest-ever first-team player at 16 years and 282 days in April 2003 and, later that year, its youngest goalscorer. He was part of the Norwich team that won the Football League First Division in 2003–04 and later played in the Premier League.

After leaving Norwich in 2008, Jarvis spent three seasons with Leyton Orient and later played for Walsall, Torquay United and York City, as well as having loan spells with several clubs. He moved into non-League football with Lowestoft Town in 2015 and later played for King's Lynn Town, helping the club win consecutive promotions to the National League, before returning to Lowestoft and joining Leiston in 2022.

Jarvis represented England at under-16, under-17 and under-19 level. He played in all five of England's matches at the 2005 UEFA European Under-19 Championship, where they finished as runners-up.

== Club career ==
=== Norwich City ===
Born in Fakenham, Norfolk, Jarvis became Norwich City's youngest ever first-team player with a substitute appearance in a 0–0 draw away to Walsall on 19 April 2003 in the First Division, aged just 16 years and 282 days. He also became the club's youngest goalscorer the following season with an 88th-minute goal in a 2–1 home defeat by Watford on 15 November 2003. Jarvis ended the 2003–04 season with a First Division championship medal as Norwich won promotion to the Premier League.

Jarvis scored his first Premier League goal against Liverpool during a 2–1 defeat on 3 January 2005 with a 20-yard shot. He spent the latter part of that season on loan at Colchester United from March–May 2005. He played six matches for them without scoring.

His 2005–06 season was wrecked by injuries limiting him to a solitary goal against Luton Town, however in April 2006 he signed a new two-year contract with Norwich. His brother Rossi was also on Norwich's books at this time, and the two brothers played together in the same Norwich team on 19 September 2006 in a League Cup match against Rotherham United, in which Ryan scored twice.

On 15 February 2007, Jarvis joined League One club Leyton Orient on a one-month loan, to replace Paul Connor who was sold in the January transfer window. He scored a hat-trick in the 5–2 away win over Millwall on 20 February 2007, and then two more in a 3–1 home win against Tranmere Rovers four days later. In March 2007, the loan with Orient was extended to the end of 2006–07, which he completed with 6 goals from 14 appearances.

On 24 August 2007, Jarvis went on loan to Kilmarnock of the Scottish Premier League until January 2008. He scored once in a 2–1 away win over Gretna on 15 September 2007, with a 12-yard shot into the bottom corner. On 31 January 2008, he began a loan spell at League Two club Notts County until the end of 2007–08.

=== Leyton Orient ===
At the end of 2007–08, Norwich decided not to renew Jarvis' contract, and he signed for Leyton Orient on 25 June 2008 on a two-year contract. In the 2008–09 season, he featured in 31 league matches without scoring, his only goals coming in the Football League Trophy. Three matches into 2009–10, Jarvis finally scored his first league goal for the club, with their only goal in a 2–1 defeat against Oldham Athletic. One week later he scored the last goal in a 3–3 draw against Yeovil. After two goals in his first five matches of the new season, Jarvis did not score again until the 3–1 defeat of Gillingham in early December. Goals against Walsall, Carlisle United, Bristol Rovers and Stockport County followed. He helped seal Orient's status in League One for another season with a 78th-minute goal in a 2–0 homewin over Wycombe Wanderers on 1 May 2010, relegating Wycombe to League Two.

On 26 November 2010, Jarvis signed on loan for Northampton Town until 5 January 2011. After returning to Orient, he spent much of the time playing in the reserves or on the first team bench, but after coming on as a substitute for Harry Kane in a home match against Peterborough United, he scored the winner in stoppage time to keep Orient's play-off hopes alive. Following 2010–11, Jarvis was released by Orient.

=== Walsall ===
Jarvis signed for League One club Walsall on 30 June 2011 on a one-year contract. He scored both his first and second goals for Walsall in a 2–0 victory over AFC Bournemouth on 27 August 2011. Jarvis joined League Two club Torquay United on loan until the end of 2011–12 on 1 March 2012. He played in the League Two play-offs for Torquay before being released by Walsall.

=== Torquay United ===
He signed for Torquay permanently on a one-year contract on 28 May 2012. He scored 9 goals in 41 appearances for Torquay in 2012–13.

=== York City ===
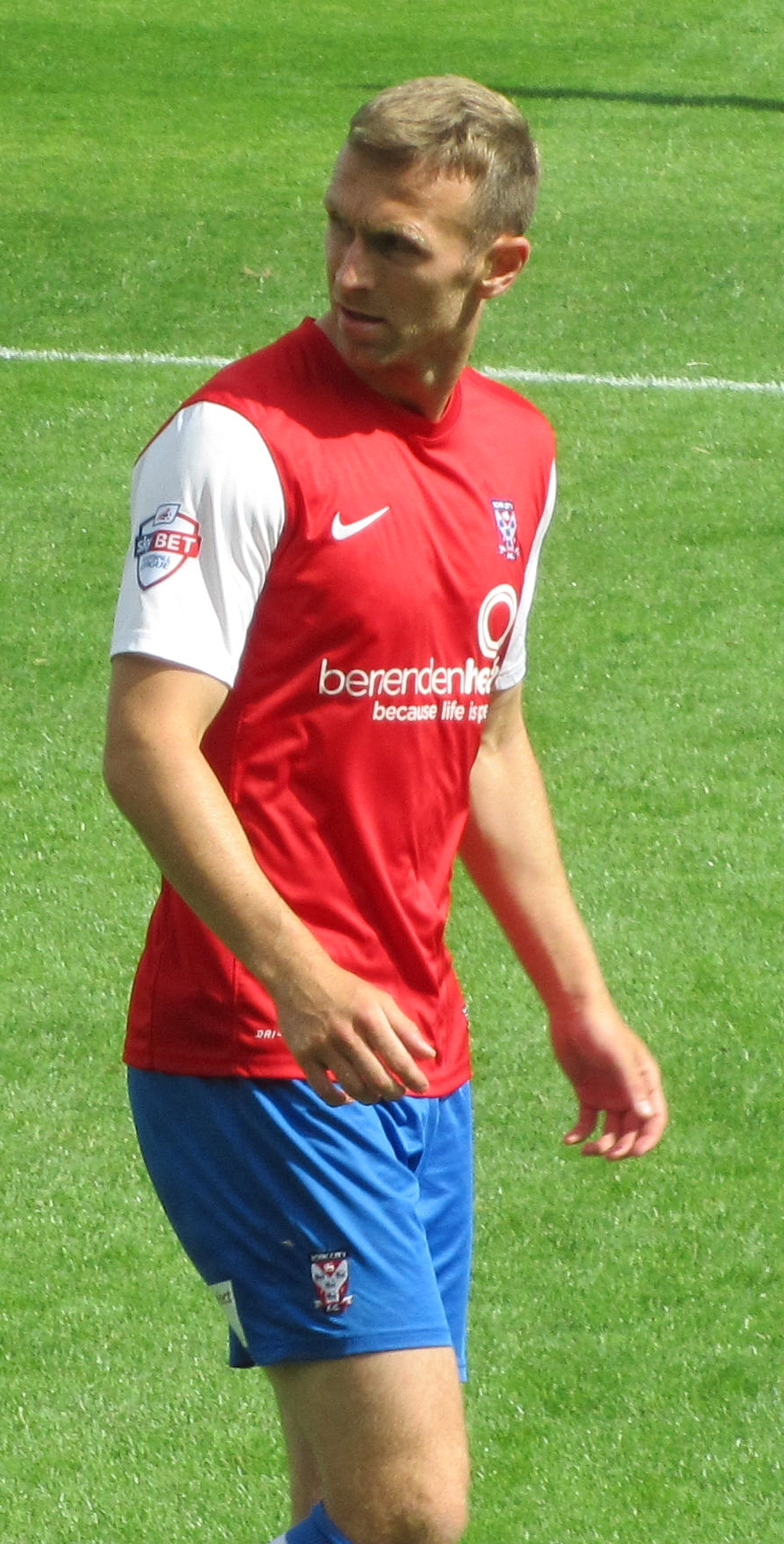
Jarvis playing for York City in 2013

Jarvis turned down a new contract with Torquay to sign for League Two rivals York City on 17 May 2013 on a two-year contract. He scored the winning goal in the 90th minute of his debut in a 1–0 home victory over Northampton Town on 3 August 2013, in the first match of 2013–14.

Having not played for York since October 2014, Jarvis joined Conference Premier club Aldershot Town on loan for the rest of 2014–15 on 13 January 2015. He made his debut four days later in a 3–0 away defeat to Lincoln City, before scoring his first goal for the club with a 92nd-minute penalty kick in a 2–1 home win over Welling United on 14 February, which proved to be the winning goal. He finished the loan with one goal from 12 appearances before being released by York in May 2015.

=== Non-League ===
Jarvis signed for Lowestoft Town of the National League North on a two-year contract on 1 July 2015. Lowestoft Town were relegated to the Isthmian League in 2016, and Jarvis signed for King's Lynn Town of the Southern Football League in June 2017. Jarvis was part of the King's Lynn Town side which reached the promotion play-off final in 2018, losing to Slough Town, but achieved promotion to the National League North a year later after winning both the Southern Football League play-offs and the Super Play-Off against Warrington Town of the Northern Premier League. Further success followed swiftly as Lynn won the National League North title at the first attempt, thus achieving promotion to the National League, where Jarvis played for one season (2020–21).

Jarvis returned to Lowestoft Town for the 2021–22 season, but following the Trawlerboys' relegation from the Southern Football League Premier Division he moved on to Leiston in the summer of 2022.

On 6 June 2022, Jarvis signed for Southern League Premier Division Central side Leiston.

== International career ==
Jarvis made his debut for the England national under-16 team at home to Wales in the Victory Shield on 2 November 2001, scoring the second goal in a 3–1 victory. He scored two goals on his next appearance in a 4–2 Victory Shield win away to Scotland on 30 November 2001. Jarvis was capped a further four times at this level, finishing his under-16 career with three goals in six appearances from 2001 to 2002. His under-17 debut came in a 4–0 win over the Faroe Islands in the Nordic Tournament on 30 July 2002, before scoring four goals in a 5–2 victory over Sweden in the same tournament the following day. He appeared on 12 further occasions for the under-17 team, ending his spell at this level with 16 appearances and 6 goals from 2002 to 2003. Jarvis' debut for the under-19 team came in a 1–1 draw away to Germany on 30 March 2004, before scoring his first goal at this level in a 3–0 home win over Denmark on 30 April. He played in England's five matches at the 2005 UEFA European Under-19 Championship, with the side being beaten 3–1 by France in the final. This was Jarvis' last appearance at under-19 level, having scored 2 goals in 15 appearances from 2004 to 2005.

== Personal life ==
His younger brother Rossi Jarvis and his cousin Adam Tann have also played professional football.

== Career statistics ==
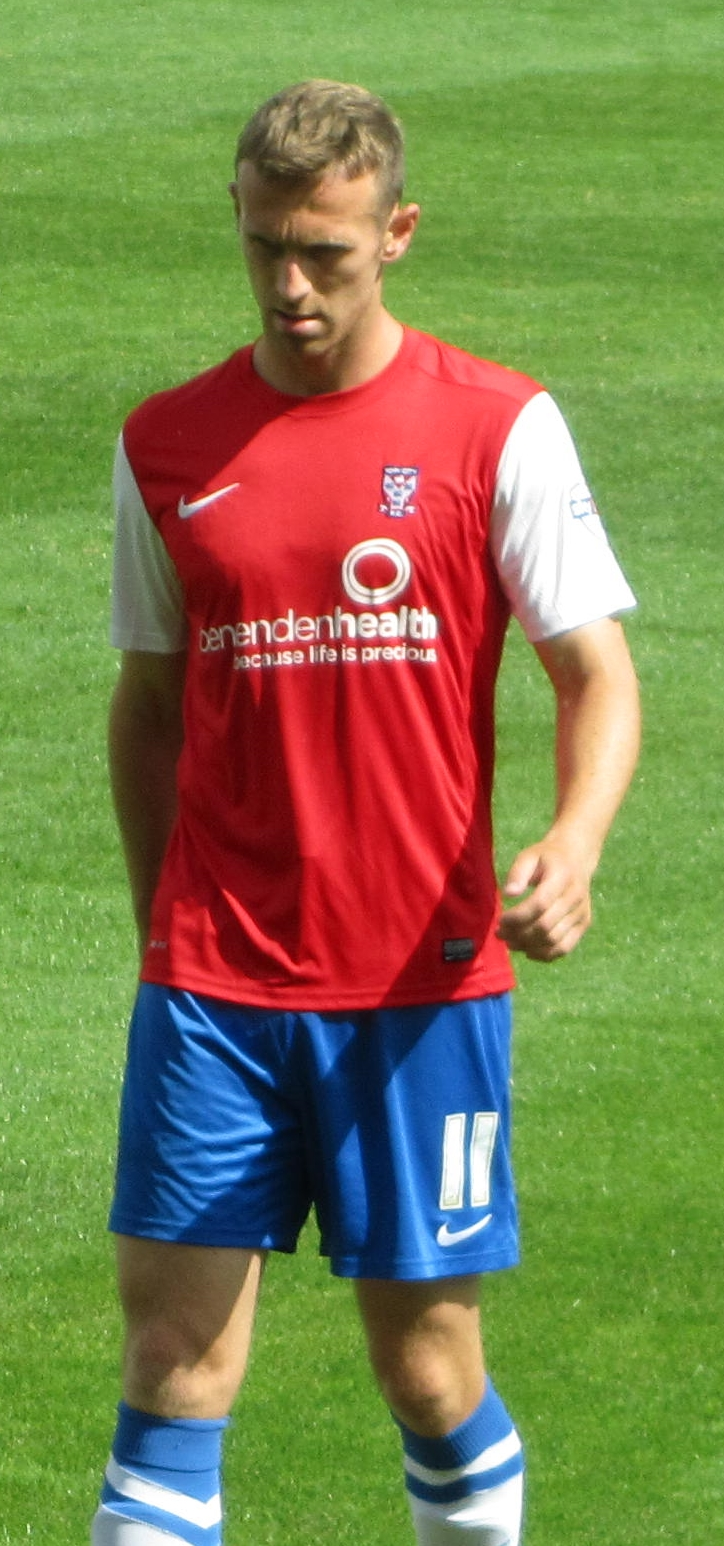
Jarvis playing for York City in 2013

As of match played 23 April 2022

Appearances and goals by club, season and competition
Club	Season	League			National Cup		League Cup		Other		Total	
Club	Season	Division	Apps	Goals	Apps	Goals	Apps	Goals	Apps	Goals	Apps	Goals
Norwich City	2002–03	First Division	3	0	0	0	0	0	—		3	0
Norwich City	2003–04	First Division	12	1	1	0	1	0	—		14	1
Norwich City	2004–05	Premier League	4	1	1	0	0	0	—		5	1
Norwich City	2005–06	Championship	4	1	0	0	1	0	—		5	1
Norwich City	2006–07	Championship	5	0	0	0	3	2	—		8	2
Norwich City	2007–08	Championship	1	0	2	0	0	0	—		3	0
Norwich City	Total		29	3	4	0	5	2	—		38	5
Colchester United (loan)	2004–05	League One	6	0	—		—		—		6	0
Leyton Orient (loan)	2006–07	League One	14	6	—		—		—		14	6
Kilmarnock (loan)	2007–08	Scottish Premier League	9	1	—		2	0	—		11	1
Notts County (loan)	2007–08	League Two	17	2	—		—		—		17	2
Leyton Orient	2008–09	League One	31	0	2	0	1	0	2 (Note: Appearance(s) in Football League Trophy)	2	36	2
Leyton Orient	2009–10	League One	42	8	2	0	2	0	2	0	48	8
Leyton Orient	2010–11	League One	11	2	0	0	1	1	2	1	14	4
Leyton Orient	Total		84	10	4	0	4	1	6	3	98	14
Northampton Town (loan)	2010–11	League Two	3	0	1	0	—		—		4	0
Walsall	2011–12	League One	19	2	3	0	1	0	2	1	25	3
Torquay United (loan)	2011–12	League Two	14	2	—		—		2 (Note: Appearances in League Two play-offs)	0	16	2
Torquay United	2012–13	League Two	38	7	1	0	1	0	1	2	41	9
Torquay United	Total		52	9	1	0	1	0	3	2	57	11
York City	2013–14	League Two	35	8	2	1	1	0	2 (Note: One appearance in Football League Trophy, one in League Two play-offs)	0	40	9
York City	2014–15	League Two	8	0	0	0	1	0	0	0	9	0
York City	Total		43	8	2	1	2	0	2	0	49	9
Aldershot Town (loan)	2014–15	Conference Premier	12	1	—		—		—		12	1
Lowestoft Town	2015–16	National League North	36	4	1	0	—		4 (Note: Three appearances in Suffolk Premier Cup, one in FA Trophy)	0	41	4
Lowestoft Town	2016–17	Isthmian League Premier Division	20	5	0	0	—		2 (Note: One appearance in FA Trophy, one in Suffolk Premier Cup)	0	22	5
Lowestoft Town	Total		56	9	1	0	—		6	0	63	9
King's Lynn Town	2019–20	National League North	16	1	0	0	—		1 (Note: Appearance in FA Trophy)	0	17	1
Lowestoft Town	2021-22	Southern League Premier Division Central	38	5	1	0	0	0	3 (Note: One appearance in FA Trophy, one in Suffolk Premier Cup, one in Southern League Cup)	0	42	5
Leiston	2022-23	Southern League Premier Division Central	0	0	0	0	0	0	0	0	0	0
Career total			398	57	17	1	15	3	23	6	453	67

== Honours ==
Norwich City

- Football League First Division: 2003–04

Lowestoft Town

- Suffolk Premier Cup: 2015–16
