= Clint Easton =

English footballer

Personal information
- Full name: Clint Jude Easton
- Date of birth: 1 October 1977 (age 49)
- Place of birth: Barking, England
- Height: 1.80 m (5 ft 11 in)
- Positions: Midfielder; left back; centre back

Senior career*
Years	Team	Apps	(Gls)
1996–2001	Watford	64	(1)
2001–2004	Norwich City	50	(5)
2004–2006	Wycombe Wanderers	77	(2)
2006–2007	Gillingham	32	(1)
2007–2009	Hereford United	51	(3)
2009–2012	Ebbsfleet United	47	(0)
Total		321	(12)

International career
1997	England U20	2	(0)
- * Club domestic league appearances and goals

Clint Jude Easton (born 1 October 1977) is an English former professional footballer.

== Career ==
=== Club career ===
Easton started his career at Watford, making nearly 80 appearances in seven years at the club and helping them reach the Premier League in the 1999–2000 season. Easton scored twice for Watford, once in the league against York City and once in the League Cup against Wigan Athletic. During this time he represented England at under-20 level twice during the 1997 FIFA World Youth Championship. He moved to Norwich City in June 2001 for a fee that had the potential of being £100,000. Easton played for Norwich in the 2002 Division One play-off final, scoring a penalty in the shoot-out (which Norwich lost 4–2) after the match had ended 1–1. He played in just over 50 matches for the Canaries before being released in the summer of 2004. He contributed ten league appearances during Norwich's 2003/04 season after which they were promoted to the Premier League as First Division champions.

Easton was signed by Wycombe manager Tony Adams in July 2004 and played regularly in the left midfield position. However, with the arrival of John Gorman as manager in November 2004, he was more regularly used in a left full back position. Despite this, Easton still managed to score three goals in the 2005–06 season, which included both goals in a 2-1 extra time win over Dagenham & Redbridge in the Football League Trophy.

On 29 June 2006, it was announced that Easton had signed a one-year contract with Gillingham, with the option of a further year.

He made his debut for Gillingham in a 2–1 League Cup defeat away to Millwall on 22 August and scored his first goal in a 2–1 home win on 12 September, also against Millwall. On 8 May, Gillingham announced they had released Easton.

On 19 July 2007 he signed for Hereford United, going on to score in his second game. He added a further two goals as Hereford gained promotion to League One. He did not feature for the Bulls at all in 2009, and was released by mutual consent on 3 April 2009.

Easton signed on with Ebbsfleet United on 23 October 2009. In the 2010–2011 season Easton experienced promotion with Ebbsfleet from the Conference South to the Conference National. However the following season was injury plagued and at the end of the campaign Easton was released.

=== International career ===
Easton represented England U20 in the 1997 FIFA World Youth Championship in Malaysia. He earned two caps by featuring in the group games against Ivory Coast and United Arab Emirates.

== Career statistics ==
Appearances and goals by club, season and competition
Club	Season	League			FA Cup		League Cup		Other		Total	
Club	Season	Division	Apps	Goals	Apps	Goals	Apps	Goals	Apps	Goals	Apps	Goals
Watford	1996–97	Second Division	17	1	3	0	0	0	2 (Note: Appearance(s) in Football League Trophy)	0	22	1
Watford	1997–98	Second Division	12	0	1	0	1	0	1	0	15	0
Watford	1998–99	First Division	7	0	0	0	2	0	0	0	9	0
Watford	1999–2000	Premier League	17	0	0	0	2	1	0	0	19	1
Watford	2000–01	First Division	11	0	0	0	3	0	0	0	14	0
Watford	Total		64	1	4	0	8	1	3	0	79	2
Norwich City	2001–02	First Division	14	1	1	0	0	0	3 (Note: Appearance(s) in Football League First Division play-offs)	0	18	1
Norwich City	2002–03	First Division	26	2	1	0	1	0	0	0	28	2
Norwich City	2003–04	First Division	10	2	0	0	1	0	0	0	11	2
Norwich City	Total		50	5	2	0	2	0	3	0	57	5
Wycombe Wanderers	2004–05	League Two	33	1	0	0	1	0	1	0	35	1
Wycombe Wanderers	2005–06	League Two	44	1	1	0	2	0	5 (Note: 3 appearances and 2 goals in Football League Trophy, 2 appearances in Football League Two play-offs)	2	52	3
Wycombe Wanderers	Total		77	2	1	0	3	0	6	2	87	4
Gillingham	2006–07	League One	32	1	2	0	1	0	1	0	36	1
Hereford United	2007–08	League Two	39	3	3	0	2	1	1	0	45	4
Hereford United	2008–09	League One	12	0	1	0	1	0	1	0	15	0
Hereford United	Total		51	3	4	0	3	1	2	0	60	4
Ebbsfleet United	2009–10	Conference National	11	0	0	0	0	0	0	0	11	0
Ebbsfleet United	2010–11	Conference South	32	0	?	0	0	0	0	0	32	0
Ebbsfleet United	2011–12	Conference National	6	0	0	0	0	0	0	0	6	0
Ebbsfleet United	Total		49	0	0	0	0	0	0	0	49	0
Career total			323	12	13	0	17	2	15	2	368	16

== Honours ==
Watford

- Football League Second Division: 1997–98

Norwich City

- Football League First Division: 2003–04

Ebbsfleet United

- Conference South play-offs: 2011
