= Adam Drury (footballer, born 1978) =

English footballer

Personal information
- Full name: Adam James Drury
- Date of birth: 29 August 1978 (age 48)
- Place of birth: Cottenham, England
- Height: 5 ft 11 in (1.80 m)
- Position: Defender

Youth career
- –1995: Peterborough United

Senior career*
Years	Team	Apps	(Gls)
1995–2001	Peterborough United	150	(2)
2001–2012	Norwich City	326	(4)
2012–2014	Leeds United	13	(0)
2014	→ Bradford City (loan)	12	(0)
Total		501	(6)
- * Club domestic league appearances and goals

Adam James Drury (born 29 August 1978) is an English former professional footballer who is best known for his eleven-year spell at Norwich City. Joining in 2001 from Peterborough United, he later went on to captain the club, and is a member of their Hall of Fame. After leaving, he had a short spell with Leeds United, before retiring from professional football at the end of the 2013–14 season.

== Career ==
=== Peterborough ===
Drury started his career at Peterborough United making his debut for the club in 1995. In total he made 150 league appearances for Peterborough United before leaving the club for Norwich.

=== Norwich City ===
Drury joined Norwich City from Peterborough United in March 2001 for £500,000. Drury was a left-back and a regular for the Canaries since he signed for the club. He was voted Norwich City player of the year in 2002–03. Norwich manager Nigel Worthington appointed Drury team captain the following season and he led the team to the Division One Championship. Drury was presented with the trophy as captain on the balcony of Norwich City Hall in front of tens of thousands of supporters.

In the close season of 2004 Norwich signed competition for Drury in the shape of the experienced Simon Charlton from Bolton Wanderers but Charlton often ended up playing in the centre of defence with Drury retaining his place on the left. Loss of form during the 2004–05 Premier League season did lead to Drury being dropped for a short time and he was relieved of the captaincy (which passed to Craig Fleming) until the start of the 2006–07 season when he was re-instated. Towards the end of the 2004–05 season he found his form again and turned in an outstanding display as part of the Norwich team that beat Manchester United 2–0 at Carrow Road. He continued to be a key member of the Norwich squad on their return to the Championship for season 2005–06. Norwich manager Nigel Worthington named Drury as Norwich City captain for the 2006–07 season, though Worthington's successor Peter Grant awarded the captaincy to Jason Shackell at the beginning of the 2007–08 campaign.

In May 2007, Drury signed a new four-year contract with Norwich. However, he suffered serious knee injury problems which saw him make just 20 league appearances in the 2007–08 and 2008–09 seasons combined.

On 28 September 2010, Drury scored his first goal for the club in over five years, netting the 3rd in a 4–3 win over Leicester City at Carrow Road. A calf strain injury in October 2010 ruled Drury out for some months, but in December of that year, he signed a new one-year deal with the club, saying:

"I'm obviously delighted to be at this special club for another year ... The gaffer and the coaching staff have got something special going on and I want to be a part of it ... The fans have been great to me since I've been here and support us in great numbers both home and away."

In 2011–12, following promotion to the Premier League, Drury's opportunities were limited due to the form of Marc Tierney. However, on 27 December 2011, an injury to Tierney led to a start against Tottenham Hotspur at Carrow Road – his first top-flight appearance for Norwich since 2005. He was inducted into Norwich City's Hall of Fame on 20 March 2012, alongside teammates Grant Holt and Wes Hoolahan, and manager Paul Lambert. After eleven years of service at the club, Drury received a testimonial match in his honour against Celtic, played at Carrow Road on 22 May 2012. Norwich won the match 2–0.

=== Leeds United ===
Drury ended an 11-year spell at Norwich, when he signed a two-year contract for Leeds United. Drury was allocated the number 3 shirt for the 2012–13 season on 3 August. Drury was named on the bench for Leeds in the first game of the season against Shrewsbury Town in the League Cup on 11 August. Drury made his debut for Leeds in the 2–1 victory over Peterborough United on 25 August.

Drury made his first start for Leeds since a New Years Day defeat to Nottingham Forest in Brian McDermott's first game in charge when he was named in the starting line-up on 13 April against Sheffield Wednesday.

On 15 August 2013, with Leeds needing to raise finances to help fund signings, Drury was made available for transfer alongside teammates El Hadji Diouf and David Norris.

On 16 May 2014, Drury was released by Leeds United.

==== Bradford City (loan) ====
On 7 March 2014, Drury joined League One side Bradford City on a one-month loan. Drury was handed shirt number 6 for his time with the Bantams.

=== Retirement ===
On 22 September 2014, Drury announced his retirement from professional football. During an 18-year career, he made 538 appearances and scored eight goals.

Drury returned to the football game in January 2015 when he made his debut for the Cambridgeshire County Football League side Cottenham United against Hardwick in the Cliff Bullen Challenge Cup.

=== Coaching career ===
In May 2018 Drury was appointed assistant manager of Eastern Counties League club Wroxham.

== Career statistics ==
Appearances and goals by club, season and competition
Season	Club	League			FA Cup		League Cup		FL Trophy		Play-offs		Total	
Season	Club	Division	Apps	Goals	Apps	Goals	Apps	Goals	Apps	Goals	Apps	Goals	Apps	Goals
Peterborough United	1995–96	Second Division	1	0	0	0	0	0	3	0	—		4	0
Peterborough United	1996–97	Second Division	5	1	0	0	1	0	0	0	—		6	1
Peterborough United	1997–98	Third Division	30	0	1	0	1	0	4	0	—		36	0
Peterborough United	1998–99	Third Division	40	0	1	0	2	0	2	0	—		45	0
Peterborough United	1999–2000	Third Division	45	0	2	0	2	0	1	0	—		50	0
Peterborough United	2000–01	Second Division	29	0	5	0	2	0	1	0	—		37	0
Peterborough United	Total		150	1	9	0	8	0	11	0	0	0	178	1
Norwich City	2000–01	First Division	6	0	0	0	0	0	—		—		6	0
Norwich City	2001–02	First Division	35	0	1	0	1	0	—		3	0	40	0
Norwich City	2002–03	First Division	45	2	3	0	1	0	—		—		49	2
Norwich City	2003–04	First Division	42	0	1	0	1	0	—		—		44	0
Norwich City	2004–05	Premier League	33	1	0	0	2	0	—		—		35	1
Norwich City	2005–06	Championship	39	0	1	0	1	0	—		—		41	0
Norwich City	2006–07	Championship	39	0	4	0	2	0	—		—		45	0
Norwich City	2007–08	Championship	9	0	0	0	1	0	—		—		10	0
Norwich City	2008–09	Championship	11	0	2	0	1	0	—		—		14	0
Norwich City	2009–10	League One	35	0	2	0	1	0	1	0	—		39	0
Norwich City	2010–11	Championship	20	1	1	0	1	0	—		—		22	1
Norwich City	2011–12	Premier League	12	0	3	0	1	0	—		—		16	0
Norwich City	Total		326	4	18	0	13	0	1	0	3	0	361	4
Leeds United	2012–13	Championship	12	0	2	0	1	0	—		—		15	0
Leeds United	2013–14	Championship	1	0	0	0	2	0	—		—		3	0
Leeds United	Total		13	0	2	0	3	0	0	0	0	0	18	0
Bradford City (loan)	2013–14	League One	12	0	0	0	0	0	—		—		12	0
Career total			501	8	29	0	24	0	12	0	3	0	569	8

== Honours ==
Peterborough United

- Football League Third Division play-offs: 2000

Norwich City

- Football League First Division: 2003–04
- Football League One: 2009–10

Individual

- Norwich City Player of the Year: 2002–03

Sporting positions
Preceded by Iwan Roberts	Norwich City Captain; 2003–2004	Succeeded by Craig Fleming
Preceded by Craig Fleming	Norwich City Captain; 2006–2007	Succeeded by Jason Shackell
