= Elvis Hammond =

Ghanaian footballer (born 1980)

Personal information
- Full name: Elvis Zark Hammond
- Date of birth: 6 October 1980 (age 46)
- Place of birth: Accra, Ghana
- Height: 5 ft 9 in (1.75 m)
- Position: Striker

Youth career
- ?–2000: Fulham

Senior career*
Years	Team	Apps	(Gls)
2000–2005	Fulham	11	(0)
2001–2002	→ Bristol Rovers (loan)	7	(0)
2003	→ Norwich City (loan)	4	(0)
2005	→ RBC Roosendaal (loan)	15	(2)
2005	→ Leicester City (loan)	6	(0)
2005–2008	Leicester City	58	(8)
2008–2010	Cheltenham Town	46	(9)
2010	Sutton United	3	(1)
2010–2012	Woking	71	(22)
2012–2014	Farnborough	37	(5)
2013	→ Hastings United (loan)	4	(0)
2014	Eastbourne Borough	20	(7)
2014–2015	Kingstonian	36	(5)
Total		318	(59)

International career
2006	Ghana	1	(0)
- * Club domestic league appearances and goals

Elvis Zark Hammond (born 6 October 1980) is a Ghanaian retired footballer who last played for Kingstonian as a striker.

== Club career ==
Hammond was born in Accra before moving to London aged six. He was a product of the Fulham Academy, joining at under-16 level. He made his debut for Fulham on 19 September 2000 against Chesterfield in the League Cup. Hammond join Bristol Rovers on loan for the start of 2001–02 season in order to get first team experience. In July 2002, Hammond signed a one-year contract with Fulham, before signing a two-year contract with the club in May 2003. At the beginning of the following season, he spent a month on loan at Norwich City, making four league appearances during their 2003–04 season after which they were promoted to the Premier League as First Division champions. He joined RBC Roosendaal on loan in January 2005, where he scored twice in 15 matches playing in the Eredivisie – the top division of Dutch football. He then went on loan before transferring permanently to Leicester City for a fee of £250,000 in September 2005.

Hammond grabbed his first Leicester City goal in a 2–1 home defeat to QPR in September 2005. He was also on target in the 3–2 victory over Tottenham Hotspur in the FA Cup third round tie later that season.

On 4 June 2007, Hammond was placed on the transfer list by his then manager Martin Allen. In May 2008, Hammond was one of six players released by the club after his contract was not renewed. Hammond joined Cheltenham Town on 11 November 2008 on a short-term contract until January 2009, linking up with former manager Martin Allen. Hammond left Cheltenham Town by mutual consent in March 2010. He joined Sutton United in October 2010, scoring on his debut against Margate. Hammond would then go on to join Woking later that month, seeing out the season and signing a one-year contract in the summer of 2011. Hammond was released by Woking in May 2012, after having helped Woking to the Conference South title.

He was subsequently jailed for his role in an international money laundering scam.

== International career ==
Hammond received his first and only cap for Ghana against Mexico on 1 March 2006 in a pre-2006 FIFA World Cup friendly.

== Career statistics ==
Club	Season	League			National Cup		League Cup		Other		Total	
Club	Season	Division	Apps	Goals	Apps	Goals	Apps	Goals	Apps	Goals	Apps	Goals
Fulham	2000–01	Division One	0	0	0	0	1	0	—		1	0
Fulham	2001–02	Premier League	0	0	0	0	0	0	—		0	0
Fulham	2002–03	Premier League	10	0	0	0	0	0	0	0	10	0
Fulham	2003–04	Premier League	0	0	0	0	0	0	—		0	0
Fulham	2004–05	Premier League	1	0	0	0	1	0	—		2	0
Fulham	Total		11	0	0	0	2	0	0	0	13	0
Bristol Rovers (loan)	2001–02	Division Three	7	0	—		1	0	—		8	0
Norwich City (loan)	2003–04	Division One	4	0	—		—		—		4	0
RBC Roosendaal (loan)	2004–05	Eredivisie	15	2	—		—		6 (Note: Appearances in Eredivisie relegation play-offs)	5	21	7
Leicester City	2005–06 (Note: Part of this season was spent on loan from Fulham)	Championship	33	3	2	1	3	0	—		38	4
Leicester City	2006–07	Championship	31	5	0	0	2	1	—		33	6
Leicester City	2007–08	Championship	0	0	0	0	0	0	—		0	0
Leicester City	Total		64	8	2	1	5	1	—		71	10
Cheltenham Town	2008–09	League One	22	5	2	0	—		—		24	5
Cheltenham Town	2009–10	League Two	24	4	1	0	1	1	0	0	26	5
Cheltenham Town	Total		46	9	3	0	1	1	0	0	50	10
Sutton United	2010–11	Isthmian League Premier Division	3	1	—		—		1 (Note: Appearances in Isthmian League Cup)	0	4	1
Woking	2010–11	Conference South	32	12	3	1	—		6 (Note: Four appearances and three goals in FA Trophy, two appearances and one goal in Conference South play-offs)	4	41	17
Woking	2011–12	Conference South	39	10	2	1	—		6 (Note: Five appearances in Surrey Senior Cup, one appearance in FA Trophy)	0	47	11
Woking	Total		71	22	5	2	—		12	4	88	28
Farnborough	2012–13	Conference South	18	3	—		—		2 (Note: Appearances in FA Trophy)	1	20	4
Farnborough	2013–14	Conference South	19	2	—		—		—		19	2
Farnborough	Total		37	5	—		—		2	1	39	6
Hastings United (loan)	2012–13	Isthmian League Premier Division	4	0	0	0	—		1 (Note: Appearances in Sussex Senior Cup)	1	5	1
Eastbourne Borough	2013–14	Conference South	20	7	0	0	—		0	0	20	7
Kingstonian	2014–15	Isthmian League Premier Division	36	5	4	5	—		3	1	43	11
Kingstonian	2015–16	Isthmian League Premier Division	0	0	1	0	—		0	0	1	0
Kingstonian	Total		36	5	5	5	—		3	1	44	11
Career total			318	59	15	8	9	2	25	12	367	81
