= Norwich City F.C. Player of the Season =

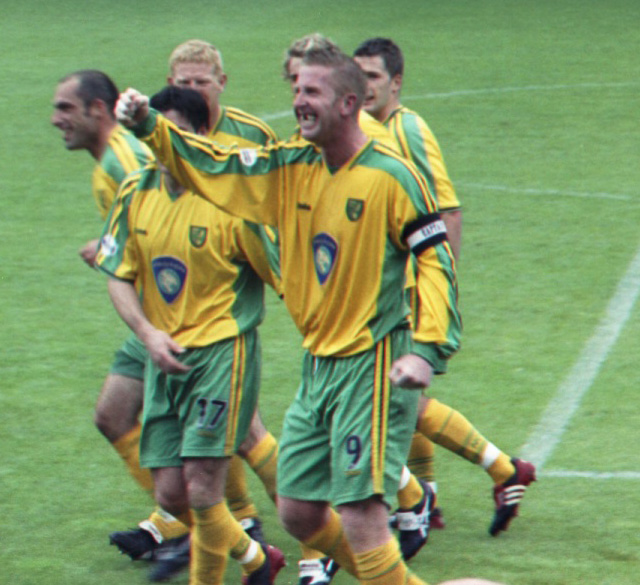
Iwan Roberts, who won the award twice.

The Norwich City Player of the Season award is voted for annually by Norwich City's supporters, in recognition of the best overall performance by an individual player throughout the football season. As a mark of respect, the trophy is named The Barry Butler memorial trophy, after the club captain who was killed in a car accident on 9 April 1966.

This is the more prestigious of two official Norwich City awards, the other being the Young Player of the Year accolade. The 2003–04 winner Craig Fleming made clear just how important this award is to Norwich City players, "It is something you dream of winning... it is such a prestigious award". Other awards available are awarded by other bodies, namely the Capital Canaries, Norwich City Independent Supporters Association, and the "Ambassador Club".

Since the inaugural award was made to Terry Allcock in 1967, ten players have won the award twice, and one, Grant Holt, has won the award three times, in 2010, 2011 and 2012. Kevin Keelan was the first player to win the award in consecutive seasons, a feat since emulated by Martin Peters, Kevin Drinkell, Iwan Roberts, and Grant Holt. Two winners have gone on to manage the club, Dave Stringer, the 1972 winner, and double-winner Bryan Gunn.

== Voting mechanism ==
This award is voted for by the fans of the club. Toward the end of the season, fans are invited to vote, either by submitting a paper slip to the club's Carrow Road offices, or by email or text message, with the winner being the player that polls the most votes. A percentage of the votes from the 'Player of the Month' awards throughout the season also count towards the final votes for Player of the year.

== List of winners ==
Norwich City F.C. Hall of Fame inductee
† Player currently on the playing staff of the club

Season	Level/Tier (Note: The official "Level" of competition in the structure of the English league system.)	Name	Position (Note: For a full description of positions see Football Positions.)	Nationality	Caps (Note: If blank, uncapped at full international level.)	Notes
1967	2	Terry Allcock	Defender (Note: By this point in his career, the former forward was playing at "half-back".)	England		Inaugural winner.
1968	2	Hugh Curran	Striker	Scotland	5	
1969	2	Ken Foggo	Winger	Scotland		
1970	2	Duncan Forbes	Defender	Scotland		
1971	2	Ken Foggo	Winger	Scotland		Second award.
1972	2	Dave Stringer	Defender	England		Went on to manage the club, 1987–1992.
1973	1	Kevin Keelan	Goalkeeper	England		First goalkeeper to win the award, and retained it the following year.
1974	1	Kevin Keelan	Goalkeeper	England (Note: Keelan was born in India, to English parents.)		Second award.
1975	2	Colin Suggett	Midfielder	England		
1976	1	Martin Peters	Midfielder	England	67	
1977	1	Martin Peters	Midfielder	England	67	Second award.
1978	1	John Ryan	Winger	England		
1979	1	Tony Powell	Defender	England		
1980	1	Kevin Bond	Defender	England		No voting for award this year
1981	1	Joe Royle	Striker	England	6	
1982	2	Greg Downs	Defender	England		
1983	1	Dave Watson	Defender	England	12	
1984	1	Chris Woods	Goalkeeper	England	43	
1985	1	Steve Bruce	Defender	England		Won the award in his first season with Norwich, who were Football League Cup winners but suffered relegation to the Second Division.
1986	2	Kevin Drinkell	Striker	England		Won the award in his first season with Norwich, who were promoted back to the First Division as Second Division champions.
1987	1	Kevin Drinkell	Striker	England		Second award. His goals helped newly promoted Norwich finished fifth in the First Division.
1988	1	Bryan Gunn	Goalkeeper	Scotland	6	
1989	1	Dale Gordon	Midfielder	England		
1990	1	Mark Bowen	Defender	Wales	35	
1991	1	Ian Culverhouse	Defender	England		
1992	1	Robert Fleck	Striker	Scotland	4	
1993	1	Bryan Gunn	Goalkeeper	Scotland	6	Second award.
1994	1	Chris Sutton	Striker (Note: Played some games in defence, but scored 28 goals in all competitions and was then sold to Blackburn Rovers for a then national record fee of £5million.)	England	1	
1995	1	Jon Newsome	Defender	England		
1996	2	Spencer Prior	Defender	England		
1997	2	Darren Eadie	Winger	England		
1998	2	Matt Jackson	Defender	England		
1999	2	Iwan Roberts	Striker	Wales	15	
2000	2	Iwan Roberts	Striker	Wales	15	Second award. Consecutive wins for first time since 1987.
2001	2	Andy Marshall	Goalkeeper	England		
2002	2	Gary Holt	Midfielder	Scotland	10	
2003	2	Adam Drury	Defender	England		
2004	2	Craig Fleming	Defender	England		
2005	1	Darren Huckerby	Striker / Winger	England		
2006	2	Gary Doherty	Defender (Note: Also played some games as a striker.)	Republic of Ireland	34	First non–British winner.
2007	2	Darren Huckerby	Striker / Winger	England		Second award.
2008	2	Dion Dublin	Striker / Defender	England	4	The oldest winner at the age of 39; retired at end of season.
2009	2	Lee Croft	Midfielder / Winger	England		
2010	3	Grant Holt	Striker	England		Won the award in his first season with Norwich, who sealed promotion to the Championship as League One champions.
2011	2	Grant Holt	Striker	England		Second award for the player, whose goals helped Norwich reach the Premier League with a second successive promotion as Championship runners–up.
2012	1	Grant Holt	Striker	England		First player to win the award 3 times. His goals helped Norwich reach their highest league finish for 18 years.
2013	1	Sébastien Bassong	Defender	Cameroon	15	First African/ Non European to win the award
2014	1	Robert Snodgrass	Winger	Scotland	15	Reserve goalkeeper Carlo Nash actually led the fan poll due to a protest vote.
2015	2	Bradley Johnson	Midfielder	England		
2016	1	Jonny Howson	Midfielder	England		
2017	2	Wes Hoolahan	Midfielder	Republic of Ireland	37	
2018	2	James Maddison	Midfielder	England		
2019	2	Teemu Pukki	Striker	Finland	102	First winner from continental Europe
2020	1	Tim Krul	Goalkeeper	Netherlands	15	
2021	2	Emiliano Buendía	Midfielder / Winger	Argentina	1	First winner from South America
2022	1	Teemu Pukki	Striker	Finland	102	Second award
2023	2	Gabriel Sara	Midfielder	Brazil		
2024	2	Kenny McLean†	Midfielder	Scotland	36	
2025	2	Josh Sargent	Striker	United States	28	First winner from North America
2026	2	Kenny McLean†	Midfielder	Scotland	56	Second award.

== Summary of wins by playing position ==
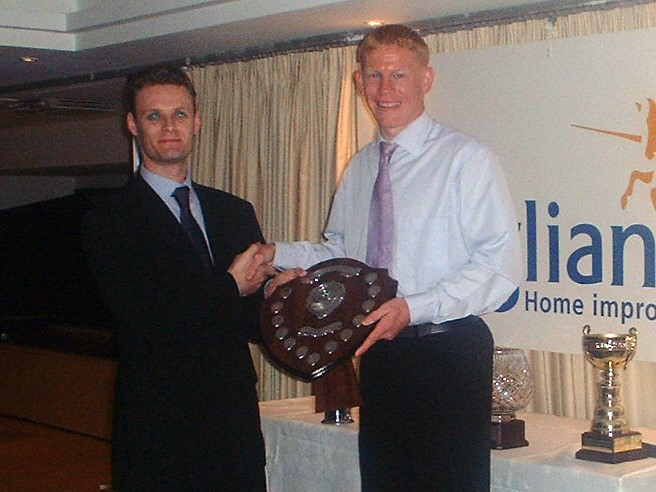
Gary Holt's achievements from midfield in 2001–02 were also recognised with the Capital Canaries Player of the Season award

Position (Note: Doherty has been classed as a defender, Sutton as a striker, Allcock as a defender.)	Number of winners (Note: Multiple winners are counted multiple times.)
Goalkeeper	7
Defender	17
Midfielder	12
Forward (Note: Includes strikers and wingers.)	17

== Summary of wins by country ==
Country	Number of winners
England	37
Scotland	11
Wales	3
Republic of Ireland	2
Finland	2
Argentina	1
Brazil	1
Cameroon	1
Netherlands	1
United States	1
