= Zema Abbey =

English footballer (born 1977)

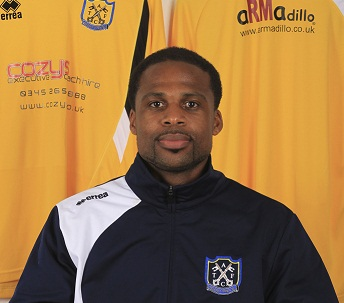

Personal information
- Full name: Zema Abbey
- Date of birth: 17 April 1977 (age 49)
- Place of birth: Luton, England
- Height: 6 ft 1 in (1.85 m)
- Position: Forward

Senior career*
Years	Team	Apps	(Gls)
1998–1999	Baldock Town		
1999–2000	Hitchin Town		
2000	Cambridge United	22	(5)
2000	→ Hitchin Town (loan)		
2000–2004	Norwich City	59	(7)
2004	→ Boston United (loan)	5	(1)
2004	Wycombe Wanderers	5	(0)
2004–2005	Bradford City	6	(1)
2005	Torquay United	6	(1)
2005–2006	Forest Green Rovers	26	(2)
2006	Kettering Town		
2007	Barton Rovers		
2007–2009	Halesowen Town	42	(8)
2009–2013	Arlesey Town		

Managerial career
- 2011–2013: Arlesey Town
- 2013–2014: St Neots Town (joint)
- 2015–2018: Arlesey Town (joint)
- * Club domestic league appearances and goals

Zema Abbey (born 17 April 1977) is an English former professional footballer who played as a striker.

He has a degree in Sports Science and Leisure Management from the University of Bedfordshire. His younger brother, Nathan, was also a professional footballer. He also owns a Luton-based company that sell footwear.

== Playing career ==
Born in Luton to parents from St. Vincent, Abbey began his career with Arlesey Town, before spending a season each at both Baldock Town and Hitchin Town, before joining Cambridge United in February 2000. He soon established himself in the Cambridge side, earning a £350,000 move to Norwich City in December 2000. However his time at Carrow Road was marred by two career threatening knee injuries, causing him to miss most of the 2003–04 promotion season, though he was given a championship medal at the end of the season. He was given a three-month contract to prove his fitness at the start of the following season. He spent September 2004 on loan at Boston United, playing alongside Paul Gascoigne and scoring once against Chester City. He then moved to Wycombe Wanderers on a free transfer the following month. In November 2004 he moved to Bradford City on a short-term deal. He made his debut for Bradford on 20 November against Brentford when he scored after just two minutes but received the first red card of his career for violent conduct after a clash with Deon Burton. His second game did not come for nearly a month because of suspension and he played a total of only six games before he was released by manager Colin Todd. Abbey joined Stoke City on a month trial in January 2005 playing in the club's reserve side. Despite scoring against Sheffield United Reserves Abbey was not offered a contract. In March 2005 he moved to Torquay United, but was released at the end of the 2004–05 season after one goal against MK Dons.

He joined Forest Green Rovers in August 2005, playing 26 times before being released in April 2006.

He joined Kettering Town in August 2006 in time for the start of the 2006–07 Conference North season, but was released in November 2006.

In January 2007 he signed for Barton Rovers He signed for Halesowen Town in November 2007. He was linked with a move to Corby Town in December 2008, but remained with Halesowen. At the start of the 2009–10 season, he returned to Arlesey Town where he was appointed player/assistant manager.

== Management career ==
In June 2011, Abbey was appointed as the first team manager at Arlesey.

In November 2013, Abbey moved with his brother Nathan Abbey to St Neots as joint manager with Gary King.

Abbey was re-appointed Arlesey Town manager in February 2015 as the replacement for Nick Ironton. He took on the title of joint manager alongside his brother Nathan Abbey. The brothers left the club at the end of the 2017–18 season.

== Honours ==
- Norwich City – First Division Championship
