= Philip Mulryne =

Northern Irish footballer and Dominican priest (born 1978)

Personal information
- Full name: Philip Patrick Stephen Mulryne
- Date of birth: 1 January 1978 (age 48)
- Place of birth: Belfast, Northern Ireland
- Height: 5 ft 8 in (1.73 m)
- Position: Central midfielder

Youth career
- 1992–1996: Manchester United

Senior career*
Years	Team	Apps	(Gls)
1996–1999	Manchester United	1	(0)
1999–2005	Norwich City	161	(18)
2005–2007	Cardiff City	4	(0)
2007	Leyton Orient	2	(0)
2007–2008	King's Lynn	0	(0)
Total		168	(18)

International career
1992–1993	Northern Ireland U15	7	(1)
1993–1994	Northern Ireland U16	1	(0)
1994	Northern Ireland U17	1	(0)
1994–1995	Northern Ireland U18	4	(2)
1998–1999	Northern Ireland U21	5	(1)
1996	Northern Ireland B	1	(1)
1997–2007	Northern Ireland	27	(3)
- * Club domestic league appearances and goals

Philip Patrick Stephen Mulryne, OP (born 1 January 1978) is a Northern Irish Dominican friar, Roman Catholic priest, and retired professional footballer. Born in Belfast, he started his career at Manchester United before playing more than 150 games for Norwich City and was a Northern Ireland international. After his retirement from football in 2008 Mulryne began studying for the priesthood, and was ordained as a deacon in October 2016 and then as a priest on 8 July 2017.

== Football career ==
Mulryne began his career as a youth team player at Manchester United in 1994. He was in the FA Youth Cup winning team of 1995, and became a Northern Ireland international even before he made his first team debut. His full international debut came in February 1997 against Belgium but Mulryne had to wait until the following October to make his debut for United against Ipswich in the League Cup (a 2–0 defeat). Despite being capable as a striker, midfielder or right winger, these positions were occupied by established players such as David Beckham, Nicky Butt, Paul Scholes, Andy Cole and Ole Gunnar Solskjaer, and so Mulryne only managed a handful of first-team games in five seasons at Old Trafford. His only league appearance for United came on the last day of the 1997–98 season, in which he played the full 90 minutes against Barnsley.

Mulryne joined Norwich City for £500,000 on 25 March 1999 in the hope of gaining more first-team opportunities. Mulryne made a promising start to his Norwich career, scoring an excellent free-kick in a televised 1–0 win at Grimsby Town in Division One which was just his second appearance for Norwich. However, a broken leg sustained in a tackle with Blackburn Rovers' Christian Dailly shortly after the start of the following season ruled him out for most of the 1999–2000 campaign.

In the 2001–02 season, Mulryne was a member of the Norwich team that reached the final of the Division One play-offs. The match ended 1–1 after extra time and Mulryne missed one of the spot-kicks in the subsequent shoot-out as Birmingham City won 4–2 on penalties. Mulryne had missed another penalty earlier that season in a league match against Gillingham at Carrow Road, however Norwich won that game 2–1. Mulryne's contract was expiring that summer and there was speculation regarding his future until he signed a new three-year contract with Norwich.

He was part of the Norwich team that won promotion to the Premier League as Division One champions in 2004, but they stayed there for only one season before being relegated. Mulryne then departed from Carrow Road, cancelling his contract by mutual agreement shortly before it expired. He signed for Cardiff City two months later.

On 30 August 2005, Mulryne was ejected from Northern Ireland's squad by manager Lawrie Sanchez for a breach of discipline. He had made 27 appearances for the team, a highlight being a headed equaliser against Denmark in 2001.

At the end of the 2005–06 season, Mulryne was released from his contract at Ninian Park having made only a handful of substitute appearances, and was not until January 2007 before he found a new club after spells having trials with amongst others, Ipswich Town, Brighton & Hove Albion, Polish champions Legia Warsaw and Barnsley.

Manager Martin Ling signed Mulryne for Leyton Orient on 23 January 2007 on a free transfer after impressing on a trial. He made his debut against Brighton & Hove Albion in a 4–1 home defeat on 13 February after 16 months without first team action. He was released at the end of the 2006–07 season, having helped Orient avoid relegation which had looked almost certain for much of the campaign.

He subsequently had a trial at AFC Bournemouth and played in a friendly against Southampton and then came a trial with St Mirren in Scotland. On 25 October 2007, Mulryne joined King's Lynn FC on a non-contract basis. He was released by the club on 1 January 2008. It was announced on 14 March 2008 that Mulryne was training with Cliftonville.

== Ordained ministry ==
The Reverend Philip Mulryne OP

Religious life
- Religion: Christianity
- Denomination: Roman Catholicism
- Order: Dominican Order
- Profession: 11 September 2016
- Ordination: 8 July 2017

Senior posting
- Present post: St Mary's Priory Church, Cork

Ordination history
History
Diaconal ordination
- Ordained by: Diarmuid Martin
- Date: 29 October 2016
- Place: St Saviour's Priory, Dublin
Priestly ordination
- Ordained by: Joseph Augustine Di Noia
- Date: 8 July 2017
- Place: St Saviour's Priory, Dublin

In 2009, at the age of 31, Mulryne began formation for the Catholic priesthood. It is understood he was invited to enter the priesthood by Noël Treanor, the Bishop of Down and Connor. He had originally intended to become a secular priest and so entered Saint Malachy's Seminary, Belfast, the seminary of the Diocese of Down and Connor. During this time, he studied philosophy for two years at Queen's University Belfast and the Maryvale Institute. He then moved to the Pontifical Irish College in Rome and studied theology at the Pontifical Gregorian University.

Having felt a call to a religious life during his studies, Mulryne entered the novitiate of the Order of Preachers (Dominicans), at St Mary's Priory, Cork, in 2012. On 11 September 2016, he made his profession to become a Dominican friar at St Saviour's Priory, Dublin. On 29 October 2016, he was ordained a deacon by Diarmuid Martin, the Archbishop of Dublin. On 8 July 2017, he was ordained a priest by Archbishop Joseph Augustine Di Noia at St Saviour's Priory. He presided at his first Mass on 10 July 2017 at St Oliver Plunkett Church, Belfast. In 2019, he was posted to St Mary's Priory Church, Pope's Quay in Cork as novice master: St Mary's is the Noviciate House for the Dominicans' Province of Ireland.

== Honours ==
Norwich City

- Football League First Division: 2003–04
