= Paul McVeigh =

Northern Irish footballer

Personal information
- Full name: Paul Francis McVeigh
- Date of birth: 6 December 1977 (age 48)
- Place of birth: Belfast, Northern Ireland
- Height: 5 ft 7 in (1.70 m)
- Positions: Striker; midfielder

Senior career*
Years	Team	Apps	(Gls)
1996–2000	Tottenham Hotspur	3	(1)
2000–2007	Norwich City	215	(36)
2007	→ Burnley (loan)	8	(3)
2007–2009	Luton Town	38	(3)
2009–2010	Norwich City	9	(0)
Total		273	(43)

International career
1998–2002	Northern Ireland U21	11	(0)
1999–2004	Northern Ireland	20	(0)
- * Club domestic league appearances and goals

Paul Francis McVeigh (born 6 December 1977) is a Northern Irish former footballer who played for Tottenham Hotspur, Norwich City, Burnley and Luton Town in the English leagues.

== Club career ==
Born in Belfast, McVeigh started his career at Tottenham Hotspur where he made 3 appearances scoring 1 goal against Coventry City. He joined Norwich City in March 2000 on a free transfer. The following season he made 6 starts and 6 substitute appearances. He also scored his first goal for the club in a 1–0 home win against Wolverhampton Wanderers.

The following season he scored 10 goals as Norwich reached the final of the Division One play-offs. In the 2002–03 campaign he was the club's top scorer with 15 goals. Most of those goals came when he was partnering Iwan Roberts upfront, although later in the season Worthington decided to move him to left midfield. The following season he scored 5 goals in over 40 appearances and helped Norwich win promotion to the FA Premier League. During the 2004–05 season in the Premier League, McVeigh made 20 first team appearances, and his highlight was when he scored at Old Trafford in Norwich's first away game.

McVeigh was made available for transfer by manager Nigel Worthington at the start of the 2005–06 season although towards the end of 2005 injuries forced Worthington to start McVeigh. McVeigh played incredibly well for the remainder of the season scoring vital goals at Leeds, Leicester and Sheffield United. This helped gain him the player of the month award in December and January and he signed a one-year contract extension. He started off the 2006–07 season from the bench but got a run in the team by October. McVeigh made a bad first impression on new manager Peter Grant when he was sent off for headbutting in injury time during the 1–0 win over Cardiff. McVeigh got very few opportunities under Grant and was loaned out to Burnley for the last few months of the season where he scored 3 goals helping them to survive in the championship. McVeigh was released by Norwich at the end of the 2006–07 season.

In July 2007 McVeigh trained with the Italian Serie B side Pisa before Plymouth Argyle manager Ian Holloway gave him a trial with a view to signing him. A 6-month deal was offered but not accepted and the following month he signed for Luton Town, the ninth player Luton manager Kevin Blackwell had signed in the summer.

McVeigh was offered a free transfer after Luton were relegated at the end of the 2007–08 season, but remained at the club as he was under contract until the end of the 2008–09 season. He featured in the game against Bradford City on 4 October, and then played regularly until late December, scoring his first goal for the club in the 2–1 victory against Dagenham & Redbridge. On 19 May 2009 he began a short trial with MLS team San Jose Earthquakes in a bid to gain a contract after being released from Luton on a free transfer. The following season, 2009–2010, McVeigh began training with his old club Norwich City with City manager Bryan Gunn not ruling out signing McVeigh and on 22 July 2009, McVeigh re-signed for Norwich on a one-year contract. McVeigh made his second debut for Norwich in their 5–2 victory over Wycombe. McVeigh started the first few games under Paul Lambert although and dropped down to the bench while the team went on a 20-game unbeaten run. He made his only appearance in 2010 coming on as a substitute in the 3–0 win over Bristol Rovers. He won his second league title with Norwich helping them gain promotion back to the Championship before calling a day on his professional career.

Norwich fans sing a song dedicated to the popular McVeigh; to the tune of Frankie Valli's Can't Take My Eyes Off You, it notes the fans' love of him "despite your lack of height".

== International career ==
Between 1999 and 2004 he was capped by Northern Ireland 20 times, first by Lawrie McMenemy in the 1–1 home draw with Canada on 27 April 1999 whilst a youngster at Tottenham, then on 11 occasions by Sammy McIlroy after McVeigh moved to Norwich and finally on eight more occasions by Lawrie Sanchez. He had previously won 11 caps for the under-21 side. McVeigh effectively retired from international football to concentrate on reviving his club career.

McVeigh called on the IFA to drop 'God Save the Queen' as the anthem for the Northern Ireland team.

== Honours ==
Norwich City

- Football League First Division: 2003–04
- Football League One: 2009–10
