= Alex Notman =

Scottish footballer

Personal information
- Full name: Alexander McKeachie Notman
- Date of birth: 10 December 1979 (age 46)
- Place of birth: Dalkeith, Scotland
- Height: 5 ft 7 in (1.70 m)
- Position: Striker

Youth career
- Manchester United

Senior career*
Years	Team	Apps	(Gls)
1996–2000	Manchester United	0	(0)
1999	→ Aberdeen (loan)	2	(0)
2000	→ Sheffield United (loan)	10	(3)
2000–2003	Norwich City	54	(1)
2004	King's Lynn		
2006–2007	King's Lynn		
2007	Wroxham		
2007	Boston United		
2007–2010	Wroxham		
2010	Formartine United		

International career
1998–2000	Scotland U21	11	(2)
- * Club domestic league appearances and goals

Alexander McKeachie Notman (born 10 December 1979) is a Scottish former professional footballer who played as a striker.

== Club career ==
Born in Dalkeith, Notman began his career with Manchester United. He only made one substitute appearance for their first team against Tottenham Hotspur, and spent loan spells at Aberdeen and Sheffield United. He signed for Norwich City in November 2000 for a fee of £250,000. Notman retired from professional football in November 2003 due to injury.

He signed for non-league King's Lynn in January 2004; he left after one appearance before re-signing for the club in August 2006. He left the club again in March 2007, and signed for Wroxham in October 2007. A week later he signed for Boston United, before returning to Wroxham in December 2007. He signed for Formartine United in 2010.

== International career ==
Notman was a Scotland under-21 international.
