= Craig Fleming =

English footballer (born 1971)

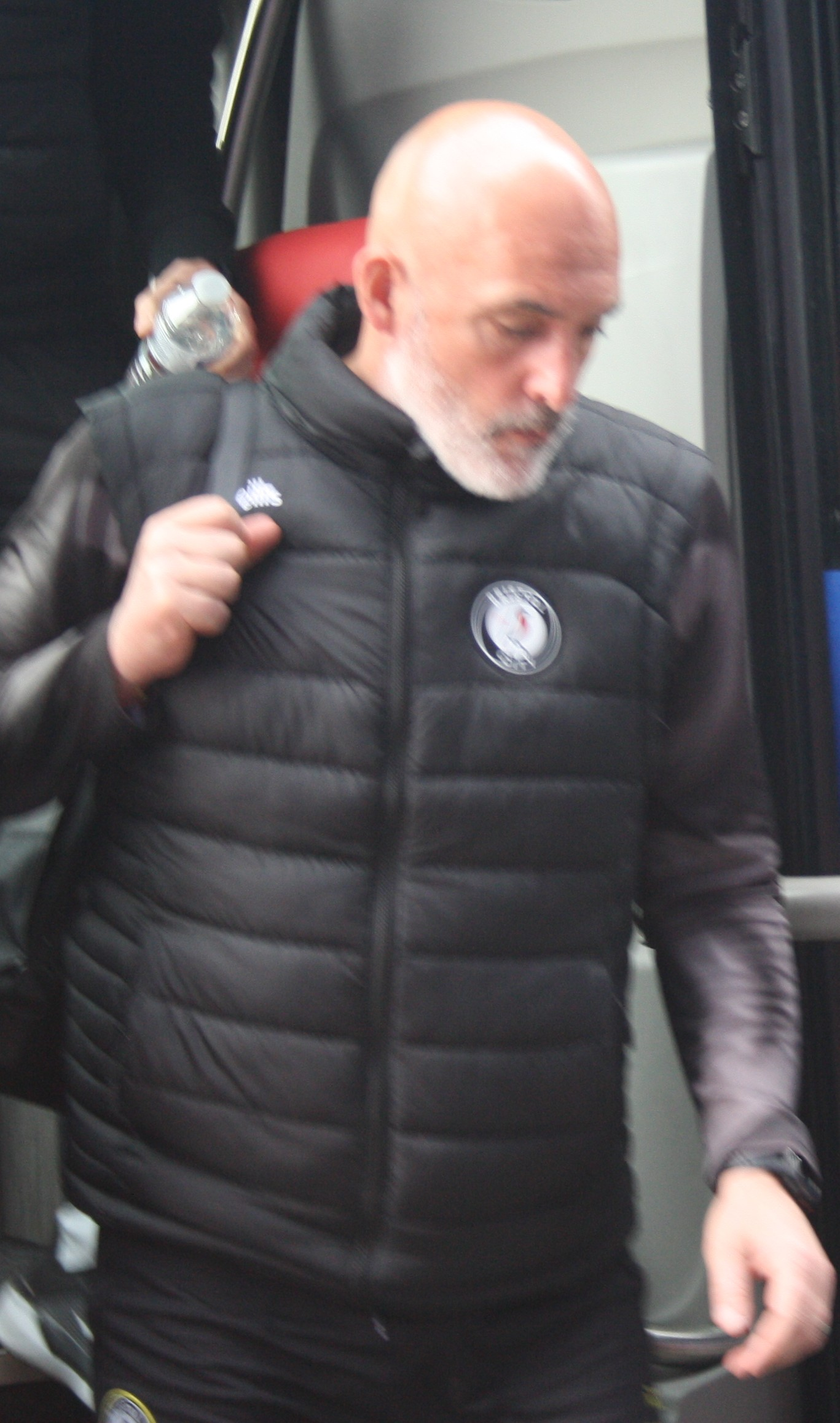
- Fleming in 2026.

Personal information
- Date of birth: 6 October 1971 (age 55)
- Place of birth: Halifax, England
- Height: 5 ft 11 in (1.80 m)
- Position: Defender

Senior career*
Years	Team	Apps	(Gls)
1990–1991	Halifax Town	57	(0)
1991–1997	Oldham Athletic	164	(1)
1997–2007	Norwich City	343	(12)
2007	→ Wolverhampton Wanderers (loan)	1	(0)
2007	Rotherham United	17	(0)
2007–2008	King's Lynn		
Total		582	(13)
- * Club domestic league appearances and goals

Craig Fleming (born 6 October 1971) is an English former professional footballer who played as a defender.

== Playing career ==
Fleming began his professional career with his hometown club Halifax Town (69 appearances, no goals) where he made his debut aged 16. He also picked up the Barclays Player of the Month award at the same age. In the summer of 1991 he moved to Oldham Athletic, where he made 192 appearances, scoring one goal. His spell at Oldham included three seasons in the top division in the early 1990s. In this period, Manchester United manager Alex Ferguson described Fleming as "the best man-to-man marker in the country" after playing some memorable games against a young Ryan Giggs. In 1993, he was involved in Oldham Athletic's great escape when they narrowly avoided relegation from the Premier League on goal difference. He became captain of the Latics in 1997 which was also the season when he left Boundary Park for Carrow Road, the home of Norwich City for a fee of £600,000. In his first season with the Canaries he suffered some injury setbacks but this was soon behind him and he became a first team regular for nearly ten seasons. In this time he also had spells of captaining his team and was a well-respected member of the squad.

In 2003, Fleming was voted into the Norwich City F.C. Hall of Fame.

On 23 October 2004, he made his 300th senior appearance for Norwich City in their home match against Everton.

Fleming was a key figure in the Norwich side that won the first division championship in the 2003–2004 season, and the supporters recognised his outstanding contribution – not just during that season but over several years – by voting him Norwich City player of the year ahead of Darren Huckerby (2nd) and Robert Green (3rd). During Norwich's Premiership season Fleming played every minute of every game, spending the most minutes on the pitch of any top flight player.

To mark the fact that the 2006–07 season was his tenth with the club, Norwich City granted Fleming a testimonial match against Newcastle United which took place at Carrow Road on 26 July 2006. This game finished 2–1 to Newcastle with Fleming playing for the majority of the game. In January 2007 Fleming joined Wolverhampton wanderers on a one-month loan deal and played once against Cardiff City. There was increasing speculation that AFC Bournemouth would attempt to sign Fleming during the January transfer window in 2007, but Rotherham United were the club to snap him up on a free transfer on 31 January.

Fleming signed for non-league King's Lynn shortly after the start of the 2007–08 season, where he was under the management of former coach Keith Webb. On 12 March 2008, however. Fleming announced his retirement due to a persistent ankle injury.

Fleming ended his Norwich City career finishing 11th in the all-time appearance list after clocking up 382 appearances.

== Coaching career ==
In 2008, Fleming joined Lowestoft Town as first-team coach guiding them to two successful promotion seasons. In the 2009–10 season they were promoted from Isthmian League Division One North to Isthmian League Premier Division. Subsequently, in 2014 Lowestoft were play off champions and promoted to the Conference league.

Fleming has finished studying his UEFA 'A' licence.

In March 2015, he left Lowestoft Town and joined the Southampton F.C. Academy as under-18 coach. In 2018, Fleming was appointed First Team Assistant Coach at Premier League club Southampton, before his departure from the club in 2022.

In August 2023, Fleming joined the coaching staff at Derby County's academy, taking up the role of Head of Academy Technical Development.

In March 2024, Fleming left his role at Derby, taking up a new role as Ralph Hasenhüttl's assistant coach at VfL Wolfsburg.

== Career outside football ==
During his time at Norwich, Fleming became patron of two charities, The Matthew Project and Radio Broadland Kidz. During his testimonial season he held events to raise money for both charities, including a hike 'n' bike around Norfolk in which he raised in excess of £23,000.

In January 2009, Fleming became an Ambassador for Sport in Norfolk. In this role he visits schools and other youth organisations to help encourage young people to achieve through hard work and dedication.

== Honours ==
Norwich City

- Football League First Division: 2003–04
