= Dulcie Mary Pillers =

English medical illustrator (1891–1961)

Dulcie Mary Pillers MMAA
- Pillers at Beaufort War Hospital in 1918
- Born: 17 August 1891; St Andrew's, Bristol, England
- Died: 2 December 1961 (aged 70); Stoke Bishop, Bristol, England
- Resting place: Canford Cemetery, Westbury-on-Trym, Bristol, England (ashes scattered)
- Education: Kensington Government School of Art, Berkeley Square, Clifton, Bristol, England
- Known for: Medical illustration
- Style: Line art; watercolours
- Patrons: Ernest William Hey Groves; Carey Franklin Coombs

Dulcie Mary Pillers MMAA (17 August 1891 – 2 December 1961) was an English medical illustrator and a founding member of the Medical Artists' Association of Great Britain (MAA). The daughter of a Bristol solicitor, she completed her art training at Kensington Government School of Art, Berkeley Square, Clifton, Bristol, graduating in September 1911 with an Art Class Teachers' Certificate.

At the end of World War I, she was a medical illustrator to Ernest William Hey Groves, a well-known orthopaedic surgeon, at Beaufort War Hospital, a military orthopaedic centre in Stapleton, Bristol. After the armistice, she completed numerous pen and watercolour illustrations of operations at the Ministry of Pensions Hospital, Bath, and Southmead Hospital, Westbury-on-Trym. She also produced illustrations for papers written by medical colleagues at Bristol General Hospital.

In the 1920s, she was a member of the Bristol Venture Club, one of the first women's classification clubs. She was also a good amateur golfer and a member of the Bristol and Clifton golf club. In later life, she lived with her mother and sister, Irene Dorothy, a former inspector for the Board of Trade. She died at a nursing home in Stoke Bishop, Bristol, close to Sneyd Park. In 1989, her artwork, including ink drawings and colour illustrations of orthopaedic surgery, was exhibited at the British Orthopaedic Association conference. In 2013, her niece donated her artwork to the Royal College of Surgeons of England.

== Early life ==
Dulcie Mary was born on 17 August 1891, at Glen Gariff, Chesterfield Road, St Andrew's, Bristol, the second daughter of Ernest James Pillers and Elizabeth Scott, née Webb. (Note: Some sources name Pillers as "Dulcibel", as noted in the 1911 Census. However, all other records, such as birth, newspaper reports, academic papers, death, and probate, name her "Dulcie".) Elizabeth Scott was the daughter of Robert Barrett Webb, a former partner in Laverton & Co, furnishers and upholsterers, at Corn Street and Mary le Port Street in Bristol. (Note: In July 1903, Webb patented a rotating bookcase where the top and base remain stationary.) Ernest James was a Bristol solicitor and the son of a hop merchant. They had married on 4 September 1889 at St Werburgh's Church, Bristol. (Note: Elizabeth Scott Webb's brother, Herbert Barrett Webb, married Annie Hester Wise in 1895. Annie Hester was the elder sister of Beatrice Ethel Wise, the founder of the first Girl Scout patrol at Brislington. Pillers attended Wise's funeral at Brislington Congregational Church, now the Brislington United Reformed Church, on 23 June 1944.)

Pillers' father had a troubled career as a solicitor in Bristol. In 1898, he was charged with forging shares in the Fishponds and Bedminster Brick and Tile Company and obtaining transfer deeds by false pretences, though the case was settled the following year. In 1905, his firm at St Stephen's Chambers, Baldwin Street, Bristol, was embezzled by a shorthand clerk. Subsequently, on 15 March 1905, a creditor petitioned for bankruptcy, and he was made bankrupt on 19 May 1905. He had been suffering from a long and painful illness, and for this reason, his public examination on 2 June 1905 was postponed. He died only a few days later on 4 June 1905 (aged 41), at 16 Withleigh Road, Knowle, Bristol. His funeral was held at Arnos Vale Cemetery in the afternoon of the 7 June 1905.

Pillers' father, Ernest James

After her father's death, the family moved from Withleigh Road to live with Pillers' maternal grandparents, the Webbs, at 20 Belgrave Road, Tyndall's Park. In 1906, Pillers began corresponding with the "Children's Corner" section in the Bristol Times and Mirror, that was edited by Florence Beatrice Hawkins, née Bird. (Note: Hawkins was known as "Uncle Jack" and was the first female journalist to have been appointed an MBE.) She entered the puzzle and painting competitions in that section, coming second in March 1907 for her "charming watercolour seascape, with softly coloured cliffs and brown rocks; also another clever painting of three kittens, and a third of a bunch of violets."

Pillers' younger brother, Robert Kingsley, would also enter the newspaper competitions. He was educated at the Merchant Venturers' technical college, gaining a scholarship to study automotive engineering at the University of Bristol. He worked for Morgan and Wood, automobile engineers at 7 Unity Street, Bristol, (Note: 7 Unity Street was then the main building of the Merchant Venturers' technical college.) before being called-up to the Northamptonshire Regiment at the start of World War I. (Note: William Morgan was professor of automobile engineering at the University of Bristol and a former research engineer at Daimler Motor Car Company. His research assistant, Edmund Baddeley Wood, was educated at Eton and the University of Cambridge, and was a researcher at the University of Birmingham and an engineer at Daimler. Robert Kingsley Pillers studied under Morgan in 1910 and spoke at Morgan's retirement presentation in June 1936.) He made the rank of lieutenant colonel and was appointed an OBE in the 1919 New Year Honours. In World War II, he served as an educational officer in the Royal Air Force Educational Service, and was given the honorary (and matching) rank of wing commander.

Pillers' elder sister, Irene Dorothy, was an inspector for the Board of Trade. She was educated at Fairfield College for Girls, Apsley Road, Clifton, Bristol, and Skerry's College, 88, Park Street, Bristol, where in July 1920, she passed civil service entrance examinations, coming twelfth out of six hundred candidates. In the 1930s, she was a member of the South-Western and Wales regional branch of the Council of Women Civil Servants. In 1951, she joined the Bristol and Gloucestershire Archaeological Society, and later, moved to The Plain, Nympsfield, near Stroud, Gloucestershire. She was elected to the Royal Archaeological Institute in 1961.

== Education ==
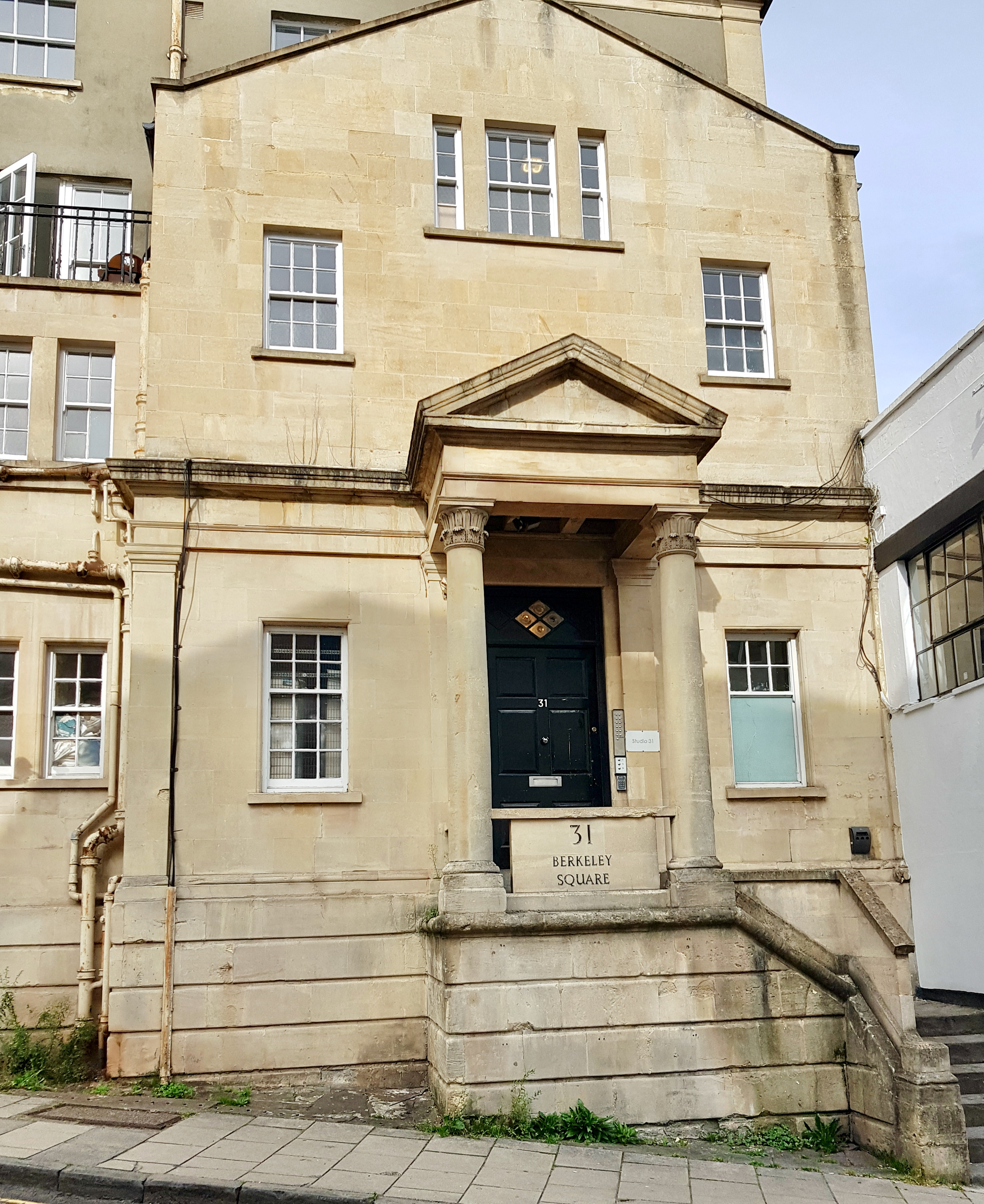
The former Kensington Government School of Art building at 31 Berkeley Square, Clifton, Bristol

Pillers was educated at Kensington Government School of Art, known occasionally as "Kensington House School of Art", 31 Berkeley Square, Clifton, Bristol. (Note: As at 2024, 31 Berkeley Square is still used as an arts and media space.) The school was founded in 1890 by John Fisher, with the objective of providing a grounding in drawing, sculpture, and design, for professional artists, designers, craftsmen, and art teachers. The school offered courses in artistic anatomy, architecture, decorative design, modelling, figure composition, and painting. There was also an annual exhibition of students' work. William Stuart Vernon Stock, an anaesthetist at the 2nd Southern General Hospital in 1908, was honorary lecturer in anatomy at the school. (Note: The 2nd Southern General Hospital dates to the Territorial and Reserve Forces Act 1907 (7 Edw. 7. c. 9). During World War I, the War Office requisitioned the Memorial Wing at Bristol Royal Infirmary, together with Southmead Hospital, to create the hospital.)

Pillers took courses in:

- 1908: Drawing an ornament from a photograph; drawing in light and shade of an ornament from a cast; memory drawing of a plant form.
- 1909: Painting an ornament in monochrome; model drawing; still life painting.
- 1911: Shaded drawing from a group of models; geometrical problems worked in ink.

She graduated from the school in September 1911, aged 20, with an Art Class Teachers' Certificate. At the end of July 1914, the school closed and moved to new premises at Broad Weir, Bristol, to form the Municipal School of Industrial Art. In December 1921, John Fisher retired through ill health, and a year later, the school was closed permanently because of dwindling pupil numbers and escalating costs.

== Career ==
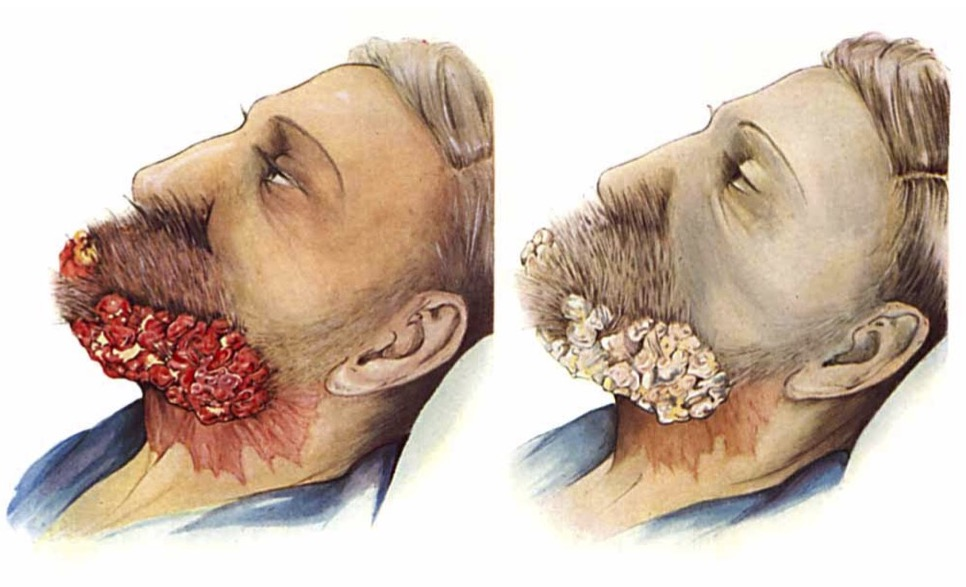
A railway porter, admitted to Southmead Hospital on 15 March 1920, with inoperable cancer of the lower jaw. The image on the left shows the patient prior to treatment with Pituitrin. Described by Robert Henry Norgate.

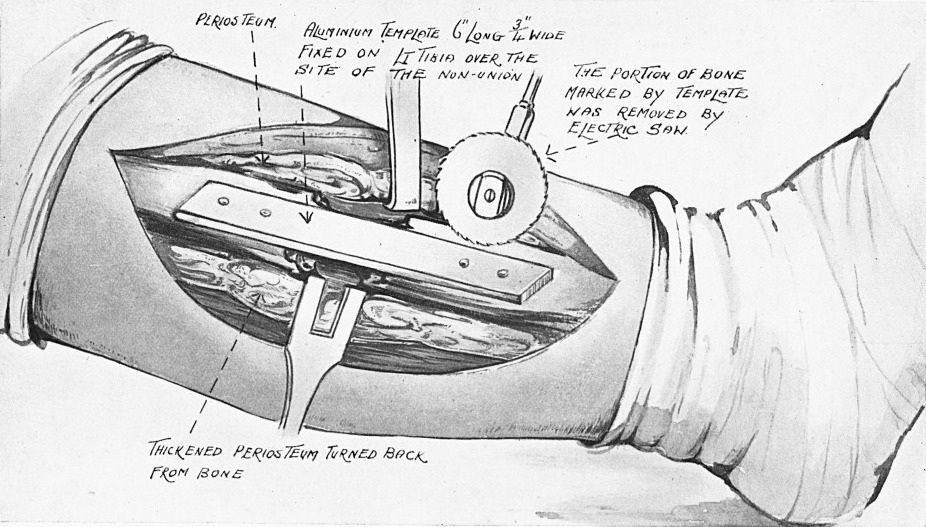
Method of inlay grafting for a gap fracture of the tibia. An aluminium template is nailed to the periosteum to guide the saw. Described by Hey Groves.

Examples of medical illustrations by Pillers

By 1918, Pillers was employed as a secretary and medical illustrator to Ernest William Hey Groves, a well-known orthopaedic surgeon. (Note: Hey Groves was born in India, the son of an English civil engineer, but had lived in Bristol from an early age. He was educated at Redland Hill House, University College, Bristol, and St Bartholomew's Hospital, London, where he won a scholarship. After qualifying he was in general medical practice for five years at Chewton Mendip, in the Mendip District of Somerset, and Kingswood, South Gloucestershire. In 1905, having taken the Fellowship of the Royal Colleges of Surgeons, and the degree of Master of Surgery of the University of London, winning the Gold Medal, he was elected to the staff of the Bristol General Hospital. He then devoted his time to general surgery, with his interests concentrated on the injuries, mechanics, and diseases of the bone and joint.) He was commissioned captain in the Royal Army Medical Corps in World War I, serving for a year at the surgical division of a general hospital in Alexandria, Egypt. In 1917, Sir Robert Jones, Inspector of Military Orthopaedics, recommended that he take charge of the military orthopaedic centre at Beaufort War Hospital in Stapleton, Bristol. (Note: Jones and Hey Groves were good friends, with a shared interest in bone surgery, and Jones visited him many times in Bristol.) The war was one of the most destructive conflicts in human history, leaving over 750 thousand British troops dead with 1.6 million injured, the majority with orthopaedic injuries. At least half the patients arriving at Beaufort had compound fractures caused by shrapnel and gunshot wounds. Hey Groves experimented with grafts and pins to stabilise the fractures and used medical illustrators to record the operations. At the time, photography was unable show enough detail of the interior of the body to be of use to surgeons. Conversely, photography was used extensively for medical records, slides, and book illustration.

Hey Groves wrote several standard textbooks on surgery for students and nurses, but before 1915, they contained few illustrations. (Note: Hey Groves edited the British Journal of Surgery for twenty-seven years. For this work the Royal College of Surgeons awarded Hey Groves a Hunterian Professorship in 1914 and the Jacksonian Prize in 1916. His early work anticipated much that followed in the field of orthopaedic surgery.) His 1915 book, Gunshot Injuries of Bones, was illustrated by Lucy Marion Joll, known as Marion Joll, the younger sister of Cecil Augustus Joll, who had proofread the book. (Note: Marion Joll had been a student at the Kensington Government School of Art at the same time as Pillers, but left Bristol in 1916, to establish a photography business with Kathleen Chivers, known as "Chip", in Bath, Somerset. Their photographic studio was known as Chivers & Joll and had premises at 1 Seymour Street, near Bath Green Park railway station, and later, at 33 Milsom Street, Bath.) From January 1916, Cecil Gwendolen St Leger Russell worked with Hey Groves at Beaufort and Southmead Hospital as a "surgical draughtswoman", illustrating his 1918 paper on the treatment of gunshot injuries to bone. (Note: Russell was better known by her pen name, "Cecil G. Trew", an illustrator of books on horses and dogs. She was born in 1897, the daughter of the headteacher at Clifton College, Bristol. She was a graduate of the Bristol Municipal School of Art (later the Royal West of England Academy), and at the start of the war, volunteered in the Voluntary Aid Detachment (VAD) for the British Red Cross. She was the only surgical artist in the British Army during World War II and wrote a book about her war experiences entitled What are you doing Here?.) Pillers, with Russell, illustrated Hey Groves's first post-armistice paper, "The Crucial Ligaments of the Knee‑joint", published in the January 1919 edition of the British Journal of Surgery. In December 1918, Russell married Niel Charles Trew, an American physician, born in Toronto, who had worked at Beaufort during the war. (Note: On 28 February 1919, Beaufort ceased work, and by that time, had treated 29,434 patients.) In March 1919, the Trews left Bristol for New York, and in consequence, Pillers became the sole medical illustrator to Hey Groves.

After the war, Pillers completed numerous pen and watercolour illustrations of bone-grafting operations. In 1920, with Alexander Kirkpatrick Maxwell, she illustrated Arthur Rendle Short's book on physiology. She contributed to a number of papers on rheumatic and coronary artery diseases by Carey Coombs, including the 1926 Long Fox Memorial Lecture. (Note: Pillers was one of the mourners at Carey's funeral on 13 December 1932 at Highbury Congregational Chapel.) In 1933, Hey Groves retired from the consulting staff of Bristol General Hospital and the University of Bristol medical school. In the same year, Percy Phillips was appointed medical superintendent of Southmead Hospital, with Pillers also working there. She continued to contribute to her colleague's medical papers, including sketches of bone cross-sections, that exhibited the typical features of renal rickets.

I have to express my grateful thanks to Miss Pillers for the care and skill she has bestowed upon the preparation of the illustrations, which form, I think, its most valuable feature.

— Hey Groves, Some Contributions to the Reconstructive Surgery of the Hip (1927).

Hey Groves died on 22 October 1944, and in recognition of Pillers' "long and devoted service", he left her his casebooks and copyright in Synopsis of Surgery. In 1945, the book was updated and edited by Sir Cecil Wakeley, with Pillers contributing new illustrations, and republished as the twelfth edition. On 2 April 1949, she attended the founding meeting of the Medical Artists' Association of Great Britain at Nunnery Close, Upper Wolvercote, Oxford, the then home of Audrey Arnott and Margaret McLarty. Also present, amongst others, were Zita Blackburn and Dorothy Davison, elected honorary secretary and treasurer respectively, and David Tompsett, assistant prosector at the Royal College of Surgeons of England, who was elected chairman. At the following meeting in July 1950, it was agreed that those who had attended the first meeting would become founding members of the association.

== Personal life ==
In the 1920s, Pillers was a member of the Bristol Venture Club, one of the first women's classification clubs, and was registered in the club's records as an "anatomical artist". (Note: In general, classification followed the Rotary International principle that member classes were determined by the services they provided to society and not by the position they held. Example membership classifications were "school mistress", "florist", and "chemist".) She was an active participant in the club's membership committee and charitable activities. However, in 1930, the club merged with the Soroptimist volunteer movement, and she allowed her membership to lapse. In the 1930s, she lived at 24 Goldney Road in Clifton, and along with Hey Groves, was a member of the Bristol and Clifton golf club. She won a number of club medals at monthly competitions, off an improving handicap of 25. (Note: Pillers' colleague, Norman Lloyd Price (she had illustrated his 1937 paper Renal Rickets), the deputy medical registrar at Southmead Hospital, was also a member of the club. He was a skilled player with a handicap of 18, sometimes called a "bogey golfer", meaning he averaged a bogey, or one shot above par, per hole.)

Pillers' home at Goldney Road was damaged during the Bristol Blitz, and by July 1941, she had moved to Kimbolton House, 2 Mount Beacon in Lansdown, Bath, close to the then Lansdown Grove Hospital, and now known as Haygarth Court. (Note: Kimbolton House was owned at the time by Francis Camm Bennett, a medical electrician and a founder of the Russell Institute of Medical Electricity at 23 Marlborough Buildings, Bath.) In 1943, she returned to Clifton to live with her sister at Eaton Villa in Clifton Down. She never married; nine per cent of all British men under the age of forty-five died during World War I. While many women remained unmarried due to the lack of available men, some women in this period remained single by choice or by financial necessity. Furthermore, vocational careers, such as medicine, were opening up to women, but only if they remained unmarried.

== Death and legacy ==
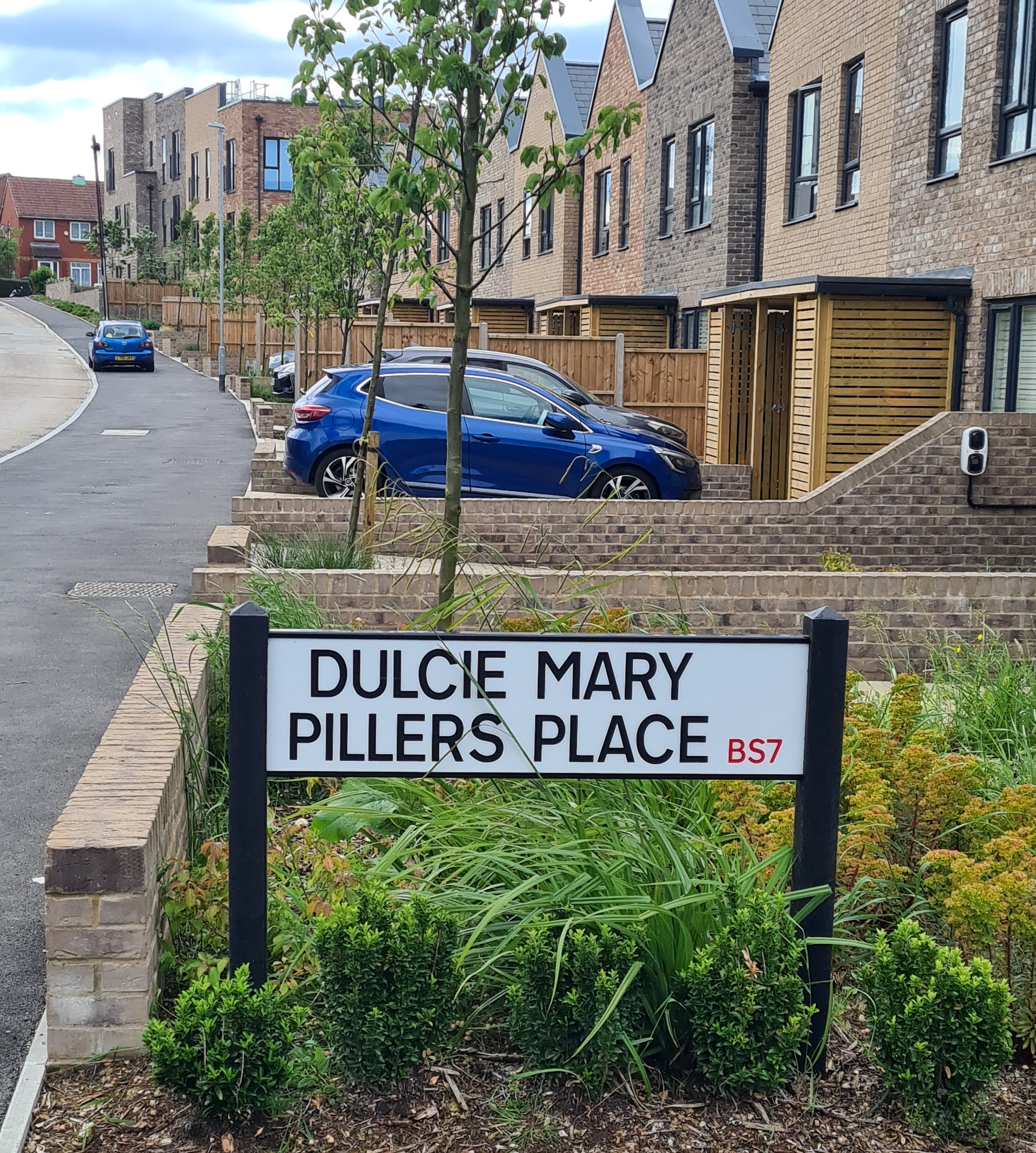
Dulcie Mary Pillers Place forms part of a housing estate in Lockleaze, Bristol

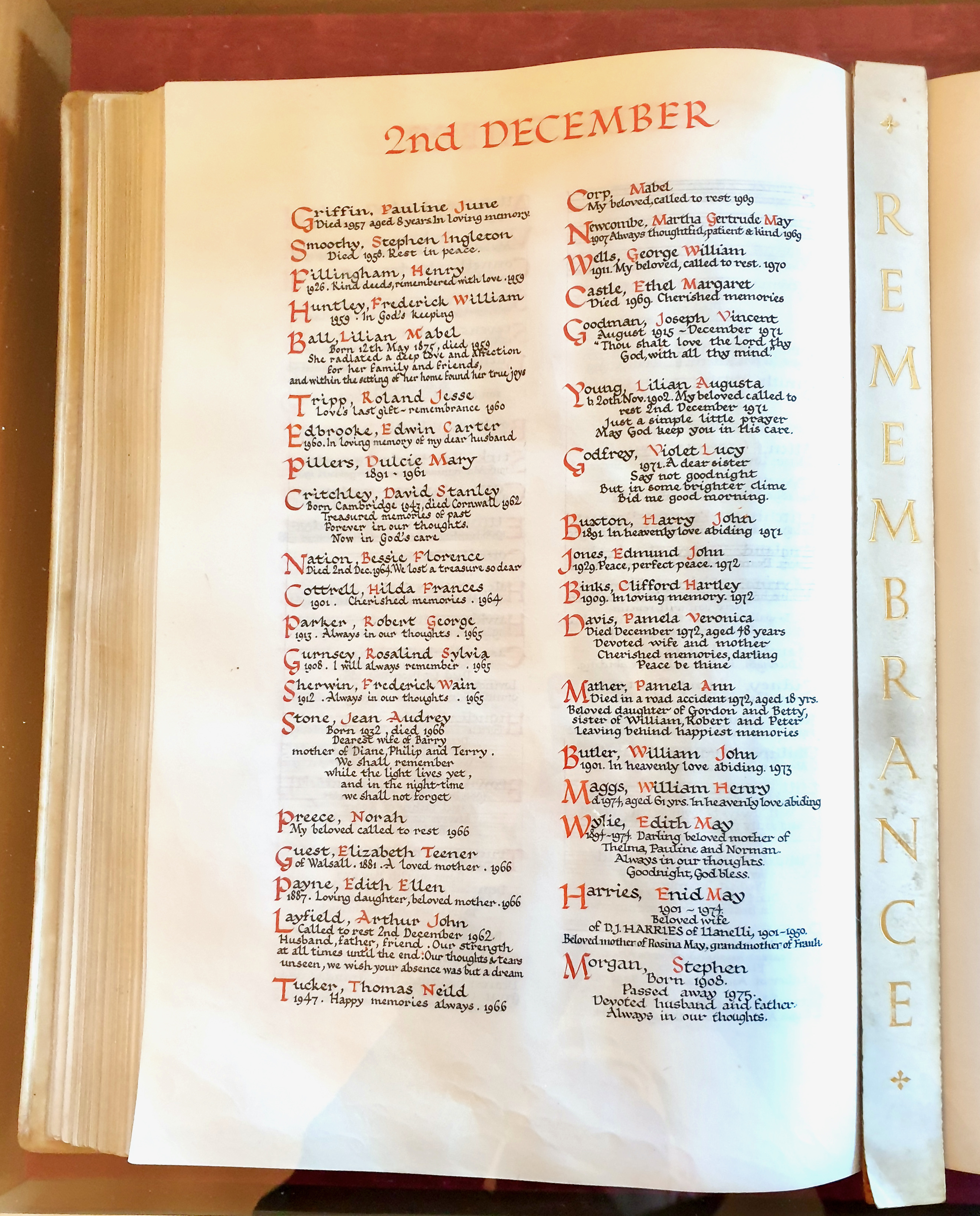
Pillers' entry in the book of remembrance at Canford Cemetery

Pillers' mother died on 9 April 1960 (aged 96) at Downleaze Nursing Home, 9 Downleaze, Stoke Bishop, Bristol, close to Sneyd Park. Pillers died after a long illness at the same nursing home on 2 December 1961 (aged 70). Her funeral was held at Canford Cemetery, Westbury-on-Trym, and her remains were later cremated. Her estate was administered by her niece, Elizabeth Mary Marrian (known as "Biddy"), née Kingsley Pillers, the only child of Pillers' brother, Robert Kingsley. Marrian was a qualified doctor, a former research fellow at the Memorial Sloan Kettering Cancer Center, and until her retirement, director of medical studies at Girton College, Cambridge. (Note: See Marrian's memoir by Fiona Cooke.)

In 1989, Pillers' artwork, including ink drawings and colour illustrations of orthopaedic surgery, was exhibited at the British Orthopaedic Association conference. In 2013, Marrian donated around twenty-five illustrations by Pillers to the archives of the Royal College of Surgeons of England. In February 2015, Gordon Bannister, professor of orthopaedic surgery at the University of Bristol, presented a further seventy-five illustrations to the same archives. (Note: On 4 June 2024, two watercolours from Pillers' later work were sold at an auction in Exmouth, Devon. Dated 1951, they illustrated abdominal operations on two infants.) In the same year, her life and career was chronicled by Samuel Alberti, then director of museums and archives at the Royal College of Surgeons of England (which includes the Hunterian Museum). On 11 March 2015, he presented this research to the Royal College of Physicians of Edinburgh, as part of a series of seminars organised by the Edinburgh History of Medicine Group. In May 2015, he made a related presentation of her work to the Hunterian Society, at the Medical Society of London, entitled Watercolour, Woodcut and Wax: Medical Illustrations since Hunter.

== Publications ==
=== As medical illustrator ===
Table of selected medical papers and books
Year	Title	Author(s)	Publication	Notes
1919	The Crucial Ligaments of the Knee‑joint: Their Function, Rupture, and the Operative Treatment of the Same	Ernest William Hey Groves	British Journal of Surgery	The majority of the cruciate ligament illustrations were drawn by Pillers. It was Hey Groves's first post-armistice paper: It is now considered to be one of the classic works of orthopaedic literature.
1919	On the Treatment of Ununited Fractures, with Especial Reference to the Use of Bone Grafts	Ernest William Hey Groves	Bristol Medico Chirurgical Journal	Figure 12 illustrates a method of inlay grafting for a gap fracture of the tibia. An aluminium template is nailed to the periosteum to guide the saw. Figure 14 shows a moulded splint that fixes the arm to the body before and after bone-grafting of the humerus.
1920	The New Physiology in Surgical and General Practice	Arthur Rendle Short	Book	
1920	The Application of Bone-Grafting in the Treatment of Fractures	Ernest William Hey Groves	The Lancet	
1920	Synopsis of Surgery	Ernest William Hey Groves	Book	
1921	Fibroma of the Mesentery	Henry Greville Kyle	British Journal of Surgery	
1921	Military Orthopedic Surgery	Sir Robert Jones and Ernest William Hey Groves	Surgery, Its Principles and Practice	See illustrations on pages 664, 670, 672, 683, 694, and 705. See page 666 for a diagram of a step-cut operation on an ununited humerus by Cecil Gwendolen Trew.
1921	The Closure of Septic Bone Cavities Following Gunshot Wounds by Muscle-Flaps	Duncan Wood	British Journal of Surgery	Illustrations of various methods of treating bone cavities due to discharging sinuses. The principal method is that in which the cavity is filled with a pedunculated muscle flap.
1922	On Modern Methods of Treating Fractures	Ernest William Hey Groves	Book	See illustrations on pages 314, 353, and 360. Includes the essay on bone grafting by Hey Groves that won the Jacksonian prize of the Royal College of Surgeons of England.
1922	The Use of Pituitrin in Inoperable Cancer	Robert Henry Norgate	British Journal of Surgery	Includes a watercolour painting of a railway porter with inoperable cancer of the lower jaw.
1923	A Note on the Operation for the Radical Cure of Femoral Hernia	Ernest William Hey Groves	British Journal of Surgery	See illustrations on pages 530 and 531 for a strangulated femoral hernia operation.
1923	Arthroplasty	Ernest William Hey Groves	British Journal of Surgery	See illustrations on pages 242 and 244 for arthroplasty of the elbow.
1924	Rheumatic Heart Disease	Carey Franklin Coombs	Book	
1925	Strangulated hernia through the foramen of Winslow	William George McKenzie and Duncan Wood	British Journal of Surgery	See the illustration on page 613 of a hernia into the foramen of Winslow.
1925	Surgical Operations: A Textbook for Students and Nurses	Ernest William Hey Groves	Book	See illustrations on pages 30 and 31 for joint and limb amputations. See page 110 for an illustration of a Caldwell‑Luc operation and page 111 for an illustration of a Killian's operation to excise the anterior wall of the frontal sinus.
1925	Fracture Dislocations of the Upper End of the Humerus	Ernest William Hey Groves	The Lancet	
1926	Ischaemic Necrosis of the Cardiac Wall	Carey Franklin Coombs and Geoffrey Hadfield	The Lancet	
1926	Observations on the Rheumatic Nodule	Vincent Coates and Carey Franklin Coombs	Archives of Disease in Childhood	
1926	The Long Fox Memorial Lecture: The Aetiology of Cardiac Disease	Carey Franklin Coombs	Bristol Medico Chirurgical Journal	Read at meeting of the Bristol Medico Chirurgical Society in the University of Bristol on 9 December 1925.
1927	Some Contributions to the Reconstructive Surgery of the Hip	Ernest William Hey Groves	British Journal of Surgery	This paper constituted the Bradshaw Lecture delivered by Hey Groves before the Royal College of Surgeons of England on 11 November 1926.
1927	The Pathogenesis of Respiratory Anomalies After Epidemic Encephalitis	MacDonald Critchley	British Medical Journal	
1928	Direct Skeletal Traction in the Treatment of Fractures	Ernest William Hey Groves	British Journal of Surgery	See the illustration on page 156 for a bradawl operation to correct lateral displacement of fractures.
1929	The Borderland between Surgery and Gynaecology	Ernest William Hey Groves	Bristol Medico Chirurgical Journal	
1930	A Case of Spina Bifida Occulta	Sidney John Hermann Griffiths	British Journal of Surgery	
1930	The Treatment of Infected Open Fractures	Ernest William Hey Groves	British Journal of Surgery	See pages 300 and 302 for two coloured illustrations of an infected open fracture.
1930	Textbook for Nurses: Anatomy, Physiology, Surgery and Medicine	Ernest William Hey Groves, John Matthew Fortescue‑Brickdale, and John Alexander Nixon	Book	Amongst other drawings, page 283 illustrates a typical humerus extension splint, and the wrong and the right way of bandaging a fractured elbow. The medical section was revised by John Alexander Nixon, professor of medicine at the University of Bristol until his retirement in 1935.
1931	Traumatic Rupture of the Aorta	Sidney John Hermann Griffiths	British Journal of Surgery	
1933	A Surgical Adventure: An Autobiographical Sketch	Ernest William Hey Groves	Bristol Medico Chirurgical Journal	
1934	Localized Hypertrophic Enteritis as a Cause of Intestinal Obstruction: With a report of two cases	William Austen Jackman	British Journal of Surgery	See page 30 for an illustration of the condition of the ileum found at operation.
1937	Some Observations on Physical Stigmata	Oliver Charles Minty Davis and Percy Phillips	The Clinical Journal	
1937	Renal Rickets	Norman Lloyd Price and Thomas Benjamin Davie	British Journal of Surgery	
1937	Renal Pelvic Epithelioma with Massive Calculi and No Infection	Arthur Wilfred Adams	Proceedings of the Royal Society of Medicine	See the illustration on page 1077 for a section of left kidney with kidney stone disease calculi. In addition to calculi, there is a scirrhous carcinoma in the renal pelvis, that Adams infers is caused by the presence of the calculi.
1938	A Case of Intussusception of the Normal Appendix into the Caecum	George Thomson Mowat	British Journal of Surgery	
1939	Vascular Anomalies of the Upper Limbs Associated with Cervical Ribs: Report of a case and review of the literature	Reginald Manson Hill	British Journal of Surgery	See pages 106 and 107 for illustrations of the post-operative condition of the hands.
1942	The Morbid Anatomy of a Case of Recurrent Dislocation of the Shoulder	Arthur Lewis Eyre‑Brook	British Journal of Surgery	See page 33 for an illustration of the anterior shoulder joint capsule.
1943	Modern Operative Surgery	Ernest William Hey Groves	Book	See page 254 for an illustration of a reconstructive operation on an ununited fracture of the neck of a femur.
1945	Synopsis of Surgery	Ernest William Hey Groves	Book	
1946	A New Method of Treatment for Severe Fractures of the Os Calcis	Kenneth Hampden Pridie	Surgery, Gynecology & Obstetrics	See page 673 for illustrations of a foot and an exposure of the os calcis.
1949	The Ocular Manifestations of Polyarteritis Nodosa	Ralph Norman Herson and Robert Sampson	Quarterly Journal of Medicine	
1983	Ernest William Hey Groves and his Contributions to Orthopaedic Surgery	Anthony Hugh Cyril Ratliff	Bristol Medico Chirurgical Journal	

=== Publications detail ===
==== Adams ====
- Adams, Arthur Wilfred (July 1937). Martin, Edward Kenneth; Moncrieff, Alan (eds.). "Renal Pelvic Epithelioma with Massive Calculi and No Infection". Urology. Proceedings of the Royal Society of Medicine. 30 (9). London: Royal Society of Medicine: 1075–1077. doi:10.1177/003591573703000923. ISSN 0035-9157. PMC 2076334. PMID 19991199.

==== Coates and Coombs ====
- Coates, Vincent; Coombs, Carey Franklin (January 1926). "Observations on the Rheumatic Nodule". Archives of Disease in Childhood. 1 (4). London: BMJ Publishing Group: 183–193. doi:10.1136/adc.1.4.i2. ISSN 0003-9888. PMC 1974921. PMID 21031664.

==== Coombs ====
- Coombs, Carey Franklin (November 1924). Rheumatic Heart Disease. Frederic John Poynton. Bristol: John Wright and Sons. OCLC 14812250.
- — (March 1926). "The Long Fox Memorial Lecture: The Aetiology of Cardiac Disease". Bristol Medico Chirurgical Journal. 43 (159). Bristol: Bristol Medico Chirurgical Society: 1–19. ISSN 0007-019X. PMC 5048876. PMID 28897003.

==== Coombs and Hadfield ====
- Coombs, Carey Franklin; Hadfield, Geoffrey (January 1926). "Ischaemic Necrosis of the Cardiac Wall". The Lancet. 207 (5340). London: 14, e1, e2, 15. doi:10.1016/S0140-6736(01)15858-7. ISSN 0140-6736.

==== Critchley ====
- Critchley, MacDonald (February 1927). "The Pathogenesis of Respiratory Anomalies After Epidemic Encephalitis". British Medical Journal. 1 (3449). London: British Medical Association: 273–275. doi:10.1136/bmj.1.3449.273. ISSN 0007-1447. PMC 2453901. PMID 20772995.

==== Davis and Phillips ====
- Davis, Oliver Charles Minty; Phillips, Percy (January 1937). Knight, Edward (ed.). "Some Observations on Physical Stigmata". The Clinical Journal. 66. London: H. K. Lewis & Co. Ltd.: 29–32. ISSN 0366-6743. OCLC 10995429.

==== Eyre‑Brook ====
- Eyre‑Brook, Arthur Lewis (July 1942). "The Morbid Anatomy of a Case of Recurrent Dislocation of the Shoulder". British Journal of Surgery. 30 (117). Bristol: John Wright and Sons: 32–37. doi:10.1002/bjs.18003011706. ISSN 1365-2168. S2CID 71480161.

==== Griffiths ====
- Griffiths, Sidney John Hermann (July 1930). "A Case of Spina Bifida Occulta". British Journal of Surgery. 18 (69). Bristol: John Wright and Sons: 172–174. doi:10.1002/bjs.1800186922. ISSN 1365-2168. S2CID 71791394.
- — (April 1931). "Traumatic Rupture of the Aorta". British Journal of Surgery. 18 (72). Bristol: John Wright and Sons: 664–665. doi:10.1002/bjs.1800187218. ISSN 1365-2168. S2CID 72859265.

==== Herson and Sampson ====
- Herson, Ralph Norman; Sampson, Robert (April 1949). Brain, Walter Russell (ed.). "The Ocular Manifestations of Polyarteritis Nodosa". Quarterly Journal of Medicine. New Series. 18 (70). Oxford: Oxford University Press: 123–133. doi:10.1093/oxfordjournals.qjmed.a066528. ISSN 0033-5622. PMID 18144843. S2CID 42882873.

==== Hey Groves ====
- Hey Groves, Ernest William (January 1919). "The Crucial Ligaments of the Knee‑joint: Their Function, Rupture, and the Operative Treatment of the Same". British Journal of Surgery. 7 (28). Bristol: John Wright and Sons: 505–515. doi:10.1002/bjs.1800072809. ISSN 1365-2168. S2CID 72810637.
- — (December 1919). "On the Treatment of Ununited Fractures, with Especial Reference to the Use of Bone Grafts". Bristol Medico Chirurgical Journal. 36 (137). Bristol: Bristol Medico Chirurgical Society: 132–143. ISSN 0007-019X. PMC 5057834. PMID 28897497.
- — (May 1920). "The Application of Bone-Grafting in the Treatment of Fractures". The Lancet. 195 (5046). London: 1048–1054. doi:10.1016/s0140-6736(00)92158-5. ISSN 0140-6736.
- — (September 1920) [First published 1908]. Synopsis of Surgery (5th ed.). Bristol: John Wright and Sons. pp. 1–620. hdl:2027/hvd.hc114x. OCLC 222195721.
- — (January 1922) [First published 1916]. On Modern Methods of Treating Fractures (2nd ed.). New York: William Wood and Company. pp. 1–435. hdl:2027/mdp.39015076989451. OCLC 9780894.
- — (April 1923). "A Note on the Operation for the Radical Cure of Femoral Hernia". British Journal of Surgery. 10 (40). London: John Wright and Sons: 529–531. doi:10.1002/bjs.1800104013. ISSN 1365-2168. S2CID 71231643.
- — (October 1923). "Arthroplasty". British Journal of Surgery. 11 (42). London: John Wright and Sons: 234–250. doi:10.1002/bjs.1800114206. ISSN 1365-2168. S2CID 221532330.
- — (July 1925). Milford, Humphrey Sumner (ed.). Surgical Operations: A Textbook for Students and Nurses. Oxford Medical Publications (2nd ed.). London: Oxford University Press. OCLC 499964018.
- — (September 1925). "Modern Technique in Treatment. 138: Fracture Dislocations of the Upper End of the Humerus". The Lancet. 206 (5323). London: 512–1054. doi:10.1016/S0140-6736(01)15565-0. ISSN 0140-6736.
- — (January 1927). "Some Contributions to the Reconstructive Surgery of the Hip". British Journal of Surgery. 14 (55). London: John Wright and Sons: 486–517. doi:10.1002/bjs.1800145506. ISSN 1365-2168. S2CID 73371967.
- — (July 1928). "Special Articles on Surgical Technique. Direct Skeletal Traction in the Treatment of Fractures". British Journal of Surgery. 16 (61). London: John Wright and Sons: 149–157. doi:10.1002/bjs.1800166115. ISSN 1365-2168. S2CID 73206550.
- — (September 1929). "The Borderland between Surgery and Gynaecology". Bristol Medico Chirurgical Journal. 46 (173). Bristol: Bristol Medico Chirurgical Society: 185–196. ISSN 0007-019X. PMC 5057626. PMID 28897414.
- — (October 1930). "The Treatment of Infected Open Fractures". British Journal of Surgery. 18 (70). Bristol: John Wright and Sons: 294–302. doi:10.1002/bjs.1800187011. ISSN 1365-2168. S2CID 73348978.
- — (March 1933). "A Surgical Adventure: An Autobiographical Sketch". Bristol Medico Chirurgical Journal. 50 (187). Bristol: Bristol Medico Chirurgical Society: 1–22. ISSN 0007-019X. PMC 5060994. PMID 28897743.
- — (February 1943) [First published December 1924]. "7. Operations on Bones". In Carson, Herbert William; Grey Turner, George (eds.). Modern Operative Surgery. Vol. 1 (3rd ed.). London: Cassell and Company. pp. 216–304. OCLC 909642486.
- — (March 1945) [First published 1908]. Wakeley, Cecil Pembrey Grey (ed.). Synopsis of Surgery (12th ed.). Bristol: John Wright and Sons. pp. 1–632. OCLC 11979926. "Note, the title link does open the illustrated 12th edition, and not the 6th edition (1922) that is stated in the archive.org record i.e. the archive.org record is incorrect."

==== Hey Groves, Fortescue‑Brickdale, and Nixon ====
- Hey Groves, Ernest William; Fortescue‑Brickdale, John Matthew; Nixon, John Alexander (November 1930). Milford, Humphrey Sumner (ed.). Textbook for Nurses: Anatomy, Physiology, Surgery and Medicine. Oxford Medical Publications (4th ed.). London: Oxford University Press. OCLC 26775942.

==== Hill ====
- Hill, Reginald Manson (July 1939). "Vascular Anomalies of the Upper Limbs Associated with Cervical Ribs: Report of a case and review of the literature". British Journal of Surgery. 27 (105). Keighley: John Wright and Sons: 100–110. doi:10.1002/bjs.18002710507. ISSN 1365-2168. S2CID 72112001.

==== Jackman ====
- Jackman, William Austen (July 1934). "Localized Hypertrophic Enteritis as a Cause of Intestinal Obstruction: With a report of two cases". British Journal of Surgery. 22 (85). Bristol: John Wright and Sons: 27–32. doi:10.1002/bjs.1800228505. ISSN 1365-2168. S2CID 73096203.

==== Jones and Hey Groves ====
- Jones, Robert; Hey Groves, Ernest William (February 1921). "23. Military Orthopedic Surgery". In Keen, William Williams (ed.). Surgery, Its Principles and Practice. Vol. 7. Philadelphia: W. B. Saunders Company. pp. 624–712. OCLC 1032668444.

==== Kyle ====
- Kyle, Henry Greville (January 1921). "Fibroma of the Mesentery". British Journal of Surgery. 9 (34). Bristol: 295–296. doi:10.1002/bjs.1800093422. ISSN 1365-2168. S2CID 4728155.

==== McKenzie and Wood ====
- McKenzie, William George; Wood, Duncan (January 1925). "Strangulated hernia through the foramen of Winslow". British Journal of Surgery. July 1924 to April 1925. 12 (47). Bristol: John Wright and Sons: 613–614. doi:10.1002/bjs.1800124722. ISSN 1365-2168. S2CID 72773526.

==== Mowat ====
- Mowat, George Thomson (October 1938). "A Case of Intussusception of the Normal Appendix into the Caecum". British Journal of Surgery. 26 (102). Glasgow: John Wright and Sons: 444–445. doi:10.1002/bjs.18002610227. ISSN 1365-2168. S2CID 73295473.

==== Norgate ====
- Norgate, Robert Henry (January 1922). "The Use of Pituitrin in Inoperable Cancer". British Journal of Surgery. 9 (36). Bristol: John Wright and Sons: 495–501. doi:10.1002/bjs.1800093605. ISSN 1365-2168. S2CID 72679580.

==== Price and Davie ====
- Price, Norman Lloyd; Davie, Thomas Benjamin (January 1937). "Renal Rickets". British Journal of Surgery. 24 (95). Bristol: John Wright and Sons: 548–569. doi:10.1002/bjs.1800249512. ISSN 1365-2168. S2CID 221533651.

==== Pridie ====
- Pridie, Kenneth Hampden (June 1946). "A New Method of Treatment for Severe Fractures of the Os Calcis". Surgery, Gynecology and Obstetrics. 82 (6). Chicago: The Surgical Publishing Company: 671–675. ISSN 1879-1190. PMID 20983137. S2CID 77916199.

==== Ratliff ====
- Ratliff, Anthony Hugh Cyril (July 1983). "Ernest William Hey Groves and his Contributions to Orthopaedic Surgery". Bristol Medico Chirurgical Journal. 98 (3). Bristol: Bristol Medico Chirurgical Society: 98–103. ISSN 0308-6356. PMC 5077043. PMID 6351971.

==== Short ====
- Short, Arthur Rendle (March 1920). The New Physiology in Surgical and General Practice. Alexander Kirkpatrick Maxwell (4th ed.). Bristol: John Wright and Sons. p. Frontispiece. doi:10.5962/bhl.title.43903. hdl:2027/hvd.hc5179. OCLC 910213822.

==== Wood ====
- Wood, Duncan (April 1921). "The Closure of Septic Bone Cavities Following Gunshot Wounds by Muscle-Flaps". British Journal of Surgery. July 1920 to April 1921. 8 (32). Bristol: John Wright and Sons: 460–472. doi:10.1002/bjs.1800083208. ISSN 1365-2168. S2CID 73407477.

== See also ==
- Audrey Arnott
- Beaufort War Hospital
- Mollie Lentaigne
- Margaret McLarty
- Medical Artists' Association of Great Britain
- Medical illustration
- Southmead Hospital
