= John Wright =

John, Johnny, or Johnnie Wright may refer to:

== Academics ==
- John Wright (doctor) (1811–1846), American doctor and botanist
- John Henry Wright (1852–1908), American classical scholar
- John Kirtland Wright (1891–1969), American geographer
- John Farnsworth Wright (1929–2001), British economist
- John P. Wright (philosopher) (born 1942), American philosopher and Emeritus Professor of Philosophy at Central Michigan University
- John Paul Wright, American criminologist known for his work in biosocial criminology
- John N. Wright, philosopher and Adjunct Research Fellow in Philosophy at LaTrobe University
- John Wright (sociologist) (born 1946), American sociologist and Professor Emeritus of African American and African studies and English at the University of Minnesota

== Arts and entertainment ==
=== Literature ===
- John Wright (poet) (1805–1843), Scottish poet
- John Clifton Wright (born 1948), American sailor and author
- John C. Wright (author) (born 1961), American science fiction and fantasy writer

=== Performing arts ===
- Johnnie Wright (1914–2011), American country musician, singer, songwriter
- Johnny Wright (guitarist) (1930–1988), American blues musician
- John Wright (pianist) (1934–2017), American jazz pianist
- John Robert Wright (born 1942), American actor, commonly known as Bobby Wright
- Johnny Wright (music manager) (born 1960), American music act manager
- John Wright (musician) (born 1962), Canadian drummer
- John Wright (film editor) (died 2023), American film editor

=== Visual arts ===
- John Michael Wright (1617–1694), Scottish painter
- John Masey Wright (1777–1866), English watercolour-painter
- John William Wright (1802–1848), English painter
- John Christie Wright (1889–1917), Scottish-born Australian sculptor
- John Lloyd Wright (1892–1972), American architect and toy designer
- John Buckland Wright (1897–1954), New Zealand illustrator

== Business and industry ==
- John Wright (bookseller died 1658) (fl. 1602–1658), English publisher and bookseller
- John Wright (businessman) (fl. 1724–1787), American businessman who established Wright's Ferry
- John Wright (bookseller died 1844) (1770/1–1844), English bookseller, author, editor and publisher
- John Wright (shipbuilder) (1835–1910), Scottish/Australian shipbuilder
- Sir John Wright, 1st Baronet (1843–1926), British steel manufacturer

== Military ==
- John Wesley Wright (1769–1805), British Royal Navy commander and captain
- John Gibson Wright (1837–1890), American Union brevet brigadier general during the Civil War era
- John M. Wright (1916–2014), US Army officer
- John Wright (British Army officer) (1940–2016), British Army brigadier

== Politics and law ==
=== Australia ===
- John James Wright (1821–1904), Australian flour miller, councillor and politician
- John Arthur Wright (1841–1920), Australian company manager, politician and railways commissioner
- John Wright (Tasmanian politician) (1892–1947), Australian politician

=== New Zealand ===
- John Wright (New Zealand politician) (born 1945), New Zealand MP

=== U.K. ===
- John Wright (Ipswich MP) (1615–1683), English politician
- John Cecil-Wright (1886–1982), British politician, Member of Parliament for Birmingham Erdington
- John Oliver Wright (diplomat) (1922–2009), British diplomat

=== U.S. ===
- John C. Wright (Ohio politician) (1783–1861), U.S. Representative from Ohio
- John C. Wright (New York politician) (1801–1862), American politician from New York
- John Vines Wright (1828–1908), American congressman and state supreme court justice
- John B. Wright (fl. 1868–1872), American tailor and legislator in South Carolina
- John T. Wright (fl. 1952), African American politician
- John F. Wright (1945–2018), American jurist, Nebraska Supreme Court justice
- John A. Wright (born 1954), American politician, Oklahoma State Representative and Lieutenant Governor Candidate
- John Wright (Missouri politician) (born 1976), American politician

== Religion ==
- John Wright (Master of Trinity Hall, Cambridge) (died 1519), English priest and academic, Master of Trinity Hall
- John Wright (archbishop of Sydney) (1861–1933), Anglican bishop in Australia
- John Wright (cardinal) (1909–1979), American Roman Catholic cardinal

== Sports ==
=== American football ===
- John W. Wright (active 1894), college football coach
- John Wright (wide receiver) (born 1946)
- John Wright (American football coach) (born 1948), college football coach

=== Association football (soccer) ===
- Jocky Wright (John Wright, 1873–1946), Scottish footballer
- John Stewart Wright (1890–1956), Scottish footballer
- John Wright (footballer, born 1878), Irish footballer for Cliftonville and Huddersfield, also known as 'Jack'
- John Wright (footballer, born 1916) (1916–1999), English football half back for Darlington
- John Wright (footballer, born 1933) (1933–2023), English football goalkeeper for Colchester United
- Johnny Wright (footballer) (born 1975), Northern Irish footballer

=== Cricket ===
- John Wright (Sheffield cricketer) (1796–1857), English cricketer associated with Sheffield Cricket Club
- John Wright (cricketer, born 1861) (1861–1912), English cricketer
- John Wright (cricketer, born 1935), English cricketer
- John Wright (cricketer, born 1954), New Zealand cricketer, former coach of the Indian cricket team

=== Other sports ===
- John Wright (greyhound trainer) (1899–1980), English greyhound trainer
- Johnny Wright (baseball) (1916–1990), American Negro league baseball player
- John Wright (basketball) (1921–2008), American basketball player
- Johnny Wright (boxer) (1929–2001), British Olympic boxer and referee
- John Wright (ice hockey) (born 1948), Canadian ice hockey player
- John Wright (curler) (fl. 1967), American curler
- John Wright (rugby league) (fl. 1970s), New Zealand rugby league player
- John "Rookie" Wright (born 1973), American handball player
- John Wright (weightlifter), Scottish weightlifter

== Others ==
- John Wright (1568–1605), English conspirator, member of the 1605 Gunpowder Plot
- John Wright (inventor) (1808–1844), English surgeon and inventor
- John Skirrow Wright (1822–1880), English pioneer and social improver

== See also ==
- Jack Wright (disambiguation), used as a diminutive of John
- Jackie Wright (disambiguation)
- Jonathan Wright (disambiguation)
- Wright, an occupational surname originating in England
