= 1994–95 Norwich City F.C. season =

Norwich City F.C.
1994–95 season
- Chairman: Robert Chase
- Manager: John Deehan (until 9 April); Gary Megson (from 9 April)
- Stadium: Carrow Road
- FA Premier League: 20th (relegated)
- FA Cup: Fifth round
- League Cup: Quarter-finals
- Top goalscorer: Ashley Ward (8)
- Highest home attendance: 21,843 vs Liverpool (29 Apr 1995, FA Premier League)
- Lowest home attendance: 8,053 vs Swansea City (21 Sep 1994, League Cup)
- Average home league attendance: 18,625

During the 1994–95 English football season, Norwich City competed in the FA Premier League.

== Season summary ==
Despite losing striker Chris Sutton to Blackburn Rovers before the start of the season in England's first £5 million transfer, Norwich made a strong start to the season and reproduced their form of the two previous seasons. By Christmas, they stood seventh in the table and looked good bets for a UEFA Cup place.

But then it all went wrong, after an injury to first-choice goalkeeper Bryan Gunn. Their final good result of the season was a 2-1 victory over title challengers Newcastle United on New Year's Eve and after that, the Canaries went into a sudden freefall, won only one of their final 20 league games (a 3-0 home win over Ipswich Town in the East Anglian derby which still kept them in 11th) and plunged into 20th place and relegation after a seven-match losing streak followed by a draw - ending their nine-year tenure in the top flight just two years after they had narrowly missed out on the league title.

Just weeks before the end of the season, manager John Deehan handed in his resignation and vacated the manager's seat to make way for 36-year-old player-coach Gary Megson. Megson in turn quit after failing save Norwich from the drop. The man selected by chairman Robert Chase to revert Norwich's declining fortunes was Martin O'Neill, who had just taken Wycombe Wanderers to the brink of the Division Two play-offs in only their second season in the Football League.

== Final league table ==
Pos	Team	Pld	W	D	L	GF	GA	GD	Pts	Qualification or relegation
18	Aston Villa	42	11	15	16	51	56	−5	48	
19	Crystal Palace (R)	42	11	12	19	34	49	−15	45	Relegation to Football League First Division
20	Norwich City (R)	42	10	13	19	37	54	−17	43	Relegation to Football League First Division
21	Leicester City (R)	42	6	11	25	45	80	−35	29	Relegation to Football League First Division
22	Ipswich Town (R)	42	7	6	29	36	93	−57	27	Relegation to Football League First Division

Source: Premier League
Rules for classification: 1) points; 2) goal difference; 3) number of goals scored.
(R) Relegated

Results summary

Overall								Home						Away					
Pld	W	D	L	GF	GA	GD	Pts	W	D	L	GF	GA	GD	W	D	L	GF	GA	GD
42	10	13	19	37	54	−17	43	8	8	5	27	21	+6	2	5	14	10	33	−23

Source: Statto

Results by round

Round	1	2	3	4	5	6	7	8	9	10	11	12	13	14	15	16	17	18	19	20	21	22	23	24	25	26	27	28	29	30	31	32	33	34	35	36	37	38	39	40	41	42
Ground	A	H	H	A	H	A	A	H	H	A	H	A	A	H	A	H	A	H	A	H	A	H	A	H	H	A	H	H	A	H	H	A	A	H	A	A	A	H	A	H	A	H
Result	L	D	W	D	D	W	L	W	W	D	W	L	D	D	L	W	L	W	W	L	L	W	L	L	D	L	D	L	D	D	D	D	L	W	L	L	L	L	L	L	L	D
Position	19	17	10	11	11	10	11	9	8	6	6	8	7	7	8	9	9	9	7	7	7	7	8	9	10	10	10	12	14	13	15	14	15	11	14	14	14	16	20	20	20	20

Source: Statto.com
A = Away; H = Home; W = Win; D = Draw; L = Loss

== Results ==
Norwich City's score comes first

=== Legend ===
Win	Draw	Loss

=== FA Premier League ===
Date	Opponent	Venue	Result	Attendance	Scorers
20 August 1994	Chelsea	A	0-2	23,098	
24 August 1994	Crystal Palace	H	0-0	19,015	
27 August 1994	West Ham United	H	1-0	19,110	Robins
31 August 1994	Sheffield Wednesday	A	0-0	25,072	
10 September 1994	Arsenal	H	0-0	17,768	
19 September 1994	Ipswich Town	A	2-1	17,447	Newman, Bradshaw
24 September 1994	Manchester City	A	0-2	21,031	
1 October 1994	Blackburn Rovers	H	2-1	18,145	Bowen, Newsome
8 October 1994	Leeds United	H	2-1	17,390	Robins, Adams
15 October 1994	Aston Villa	A	1-1	22,468	Milligan
22 October 1994	Queens Park Rangers	H	4-2	19,431	Robins, Bowen, Sheron, White (own goal)
30 October 1994	Wimbledon	A	0-1	8,242	
2 November 1994	Southampton	A	1-1	12,976	Robins
5 November 1994	Everton	H	0-0	18,377	
19 November 1994	Coventry City	A	0-1	11,885	
26 November 1994	Leicester City	H	2-1	20,657	Newsome, Sutch
3 December 1994	Manchester United	A	0-1	43,789	
10 December 1994	Chelsea	H	3-0	18,246	Ward (2), Cureton
17 December 1994	Crystal Palace	A	1-0	12,252	Ward
26 December 1994	Tottenham Hotspur	H	0-2	21,814	
27 December 1994	Nottingham Forest	A	0-1	21,010	
31 December 1994	Newcastle United	H	2-1	21,172	Adams, Ward
2 January 1995	Liverpool	A	0-4	34,709	
14 January 1995	Wimbledon	H	1-2	18,261	Goss
25 January 1995	Coventry City	H	2-2	14,024	Adams, Ward
4 February 1995	Everton	A	1-2	23,293	Milligan
11 February 1995	Southampton	H	2-2	18,361	Newsome, Ward
22 February 1995	Manchester United	H	0-2	21,824	
25 February 1995	Blackburn Rovers	A	0-0	25,579	
4 March 1995	Manchester City	H	1-1	16,266	Cureton
8 March 1995	Sheffield Wednesday	H	0-0	13,530	
11 March 1995	West Ham United	A	2-2	21,464	Eadie, Ullathorne
15 March 1995	Queens Park Rangers	A	0-2	10,519	
20 March 1995	Ipswich Town	H	3-0	17,510	Cureton, Ward, Eadie
1 April 1995	Arsenal	A	1-5	36,942	Cureton
5 April 1995	Leicester City	A	0-1	15,992	
8 April 1995	Newcastle United	A	0-3	35,518	
12 April 1995	Nottingham Forest	H	0-1	19,005	
17 April 1995	Tottenham Hotspur	A	0-1	32,304	
29 April 1995	Liverpool	H	1-2	21,843	Ullathorne
6 May 1995	Leeds United	A	1-2	31,982	Ward
14 May 1995	Aston Villa	H	1-1	19,374	Goss

=== FA Cup ===
Round	Date	Opponent	Venue	Result	Attendance	Goalscorers
R3	7 January 1995	Grimsby Town	A	1-0	11,198	Crook
R4	28 January 1995	Coventry City	A	0-0	15,101	
R4R	8 February 1995	Coventry City	H	3-1 (a.e.t.)	14,673	Sheron (2), Eadie
R5	18 February 1995	Everton	A	0-5	31,616	

=== League Cup ===
Round	Date	Opponent	Venue	Result	Attendance	Goalscorers
R2 1st Leg	21 September 1994	Swansea City	H	3-0	8,053	Sheron, Bradshaw (pen), Adams
R2 2nd Leg	4 October 1994	Swansea City	A	0-1 (won 3-1 on agg)	3,568	
R3	26 October 1994	Tranmere Rovers	A	1-1	10,232	Polston
R3R	9 November 1994	Tranmere Rovers	H	4-2	13,331	Polston, Prior, Newman, McGreal (own goal)
R4	30 November 1994	Notts County	H	1-0	14,030	Eadie
R5	11 January 1995	Bolton Wanderers	A	0-1	17,029	

== Players ==
=== First-team squad ===
Squad at end of season

Note: Flags indicate national team as defined under FIFA eligibility rules; some limited exceptions apply. Players may hold more than one non-FIFA nationality.

No.	Pos.	Nation	Player
1	GK	SCO	Bryan Gunn
2	DF	WAL	Mark Bowen
3	DF	ENG	Rob Newman
4	MF	ENG	Ian Crook (vice-captain)
5	DF	ENG	Jon Newsome (captain)
6	MF	ENG	Neil Adams
7	FW	ENG	Ashley Ward
8	MF	IRL	Mike Milligan (Note: Milligan was born in Manchester, England, but also qualified to represent the Republic of Ireland internationally and represented them at U-21, U-23, and B level before making his international debut for Republic of Ireland in 1992.)
9	MF	ENG	Gary Megson
10	DF	ENG	John Polston
11	MF	WAL	Jeremy Goss (Note: Goss was born in Oekolia, Cyprus, but also qualified to represent Wales internationally and made his international debut for Wales in May 1991.)
12	DF	ENG	Andy Brownrigg
13	GK	ENG	Darren Crowfoot
14	DF	ENG	Spencer Prior
15	DF	ENG	Daryl Sutch
16	DF	ENG	Carl Bradshaw

No.	Pos.	Nation	Player
18	DF	ENG	Robert Ullathorne
19	MF	ENG	Andy Johnson (Note: Johnson was born in Bristol, England, but also qualified to represent Wales internationally and made his international debut for Wales in 1998.)
20	MF	ENG	Darren Eadie
21	MF	IRL	Keith O'Neill
22	FW	ENG	Mike Sheron
23	MF	IRL	Shaun Carey (Note: Carey was born in Kettering, England, but also qualified to represent the Republic of Ireland internationally and represented them at U-21 level.)
24	GK	ENG	Andy Marshall
25	FW	ENG	Jamie Cureton
26	FW	ENG	Ade Akinbiyi (Note: Akinbiyi was born in Hackney, England, but also qualified to represent Nigeria internationally through his parents and would make his international debut for Nigeria in November 1999.)
27	MF	ENG	Ali Gibb
28	FW	ENG	Justin Harrington
29	DF	ENG	Stacey Kreft
30	MF	ENG	Jimmy Simpson
31	MF	ENG	Marcus Oldburyn
32	DF	NIR	Johnny Wright
33	DF	ENG	Danny Mills

=== Left club during season ===
Note: Flags indicate national team as defined under FIFA eligibility rules; some limited exceptions apply. Players may hold more than one non-FIFA nationality.

No.	Pos.	Nation	Player
7	FW	NGA	Efan Ekoku (Note: Ekoku was born in Cheetham, England, but also qualified to represent Nigeria internationally and made his international debut for Nigeria in 1994.) (to Wimbledon)
12	FW	ENG	Mark Robins (to Leicester City)
12	DF	ENG	Ian Culverhouse (to Swindon Town)
13	GK	SCO	Scott Howie (to Motherwell)

No.	Pos.	Nation	Player
34	GK	ENG	Simon Tracey (on loan from Sheffield United)
34	GK	ENG	Jon Hallworth (on loan from Oldham Athletic)
34	GK	ENG	Andy Rhodes (on loan from Bolton Wanderers)

== Transfers ==
=== In ===
Date	Pos	Name	From	Fee
30 June 1994	DF	Jon Newsome	Leeds United	£1,000,000
28 July 1994	DF	Carl Bradshaw	Sheffield United	£500,000
26 August 1994	FW	Mike Sheron	Manchester City	£1,000,000
8 December 1994	FW	Ashley Ward	Crewe Alexandra	£500,000

=== Out ===
Date	Pos	Name	To	Fee
5 July 1994	MF	David Smith	Oxford United	£100,000
13 July 1994	FW	Chris Sutton	Blackburn Rovers	£5,000,000
19 July 1994	DF	Colin Woodthorpe	Aberdeen	£400,000
13 October 1994	GK	Scott Howie	Motherwell	£300,000
14 October 1994	FW	Efan Ekoku	Wimbledon	£900,000
9 December 1994	DF	Ian Culverhouse	Swindon Town	£250,000
16 January 1995	FW	Mark Robins	Leicester City	£1,000,000

Transfers in: ▼£3,000,000
Transfers out: ▲£7,950,000
Total spending: ▲£4,950,000
