= Zita Stead =

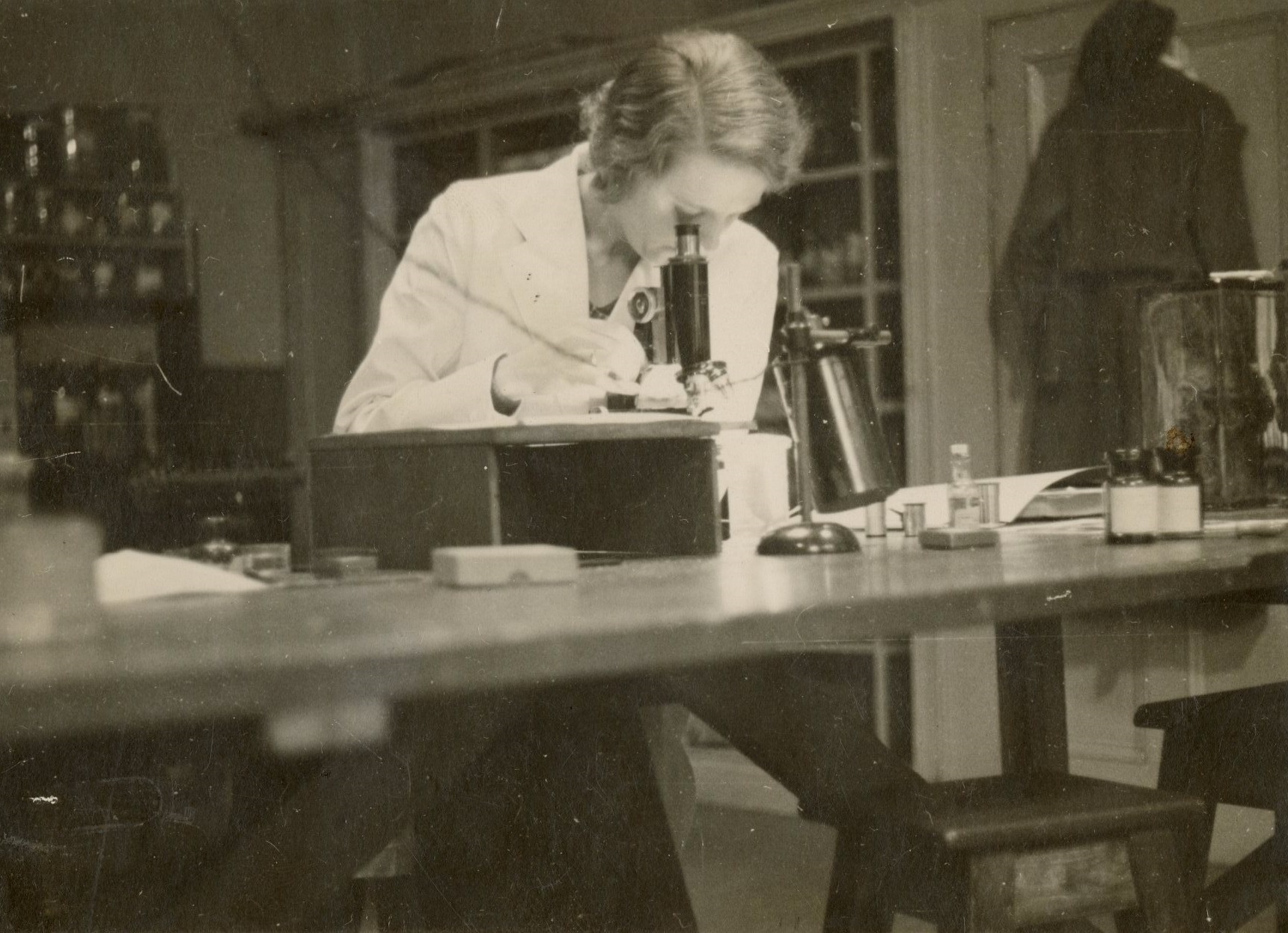
Zita Stead at the Anatomy Department, St Bartholomew's Hospital, c.1933–1936

Zita Mary Stead Blackburn (née Stead; 1904–1986) was a medical illustrator and one of the founders of the Medical Artists Association of Great Britain.

== Early life ==
Zita Stead was born on 21 March 1904 in Bedale, North Yorkshire. Her parents were Robert Stead, a blacksmith, and Mary Helen. She had a brother, George Robert, and three sisters; Mary Helen, Christina and Winifred.

== Training and career ==
Stead gained a diploma in fine art from the Scarborough School of Art and studied anatomy and histology at King's College London.

In 1933 she was appointed as artist and research assistant in the Department of Anatomy under H.H. Woollard at St Bartholomew's Hospital Medical College. In addition to her work for the department, Stead provided illustrations of surgical procedures, pathological specimens, teaching exhibits and other medical artwork for various clinical units at St Bartholomew's Hospital. Stead was also an expert in photomicrography and examples of her work were featured in medical journals and textbooks including Gray's Anatomy and Cunningham's Textbook of Anatomy.

In 1936, Stead moved to University College London along with H.H. Woollard. During the Second World War, Stead was assigned to work with Arnold Kirkpatrick Henry at the Royal Postgraduate Medical School in Hammersmith, London. They collaborated on the publication Extensile Exposure Applied to Limb Surgery (Edinburgh: E. & S. Livingstone Ltd. 1945), a revised edition of Henry's previous book Exposure of the Long Bones (1927). According to Stead, most of the research and illustration work for this was carried out in the post-mortem room where tutorials were held for paratroop surgeons being taught how to access main arterial supplies between muscles without resort to drastic surgery.

After the war, Stead worked mainly in a freelance capacity. In 1949 she was one of a group of established medical illustrators, along with Dorothy Davison, Audrey Arnott, Margaret McLarty, Clifford Shepley, Dr David Thompsett and Dorothy Barber, who founded the Medical Artists Association of Great Britain. The chief aim of the Association was to set professional standards and act as a qualifying body for new entrants to the field. Stead served as the Association's Honorary Secretary.

Following the death of her husband, Stead returned to full-time employment as Medical Artist at the University of Manchester from 1958 until 1959.

== Personal life ==
Zita Stead married Edgar Blackburn in April 1940 in Kensington, London. Following her marriage, Stead was known by the name Zita Stead Blackburn. Edgar Blackburn died on 19 October 1956. Stead spent her retirement in Kingston-upon-Thames where she indulged her hobbies of golf and fishing. She died on 31 August 1986, aged 82.
