= Dorothy Davison =

British artist and illustrator (1889–1984)

- Born: 9 March 1889; Manchester, England
- Died: 4 February 1984 (aged 94); Manchester, England
- Education: Manchester School of Art
- Occupations: Medical artist, writer
- Employer: Manchester Royal Infirmary
- Organization: Medical Artists Association of Great Britain (founder)
- Known for: Pioneering the Ross board technique in the UK

Dorothy Davison (9 March 1889 – 4 February 1984) was a British writer and medical illustrator. She founded the Medical Artists' Association in 1949, and trained many young medical artists in Manchester.

== Early life and education ==
Davison enrolled at the Manchester School of Art around the age of 18. She was forced to leave without any formal qualifications in order to care for her aging parents. Around 1917, Davison began working at the Manchester Museum, where she taught Egyptology to children and pursued an interest in prehistory. She retained this interest throughout her life, ultimately publishing four works on prehistory.

== Career ==
At the Manchester Museum, Davison met Sir Grafton Elliot Smith, then a professor of anatomy at the University of Manchester and an egyptologist. Smith encouraged Davison to pursue a career in medical illustration, commissioning her to produce anatomical drawings for him. Her first assignment was to illustrate a reptilian brain from over 50 histological sections. She subsequently worked with anatomist Sir John Stopford, and later with Sir Geoffrey Jefferson. Davison worked across a number of different specialities, and with a range of practitioners. She produced illustrations for orthopaedic surgeon Sir Harry Platt, Professor of Anatomy G.A.G Mitchell, and obstetrician Daniel Dougal. She worked particularly closely with Jefferson, a neurosurgeon, and always emphasised the importance of collaboration between artist and practitioner. Davison also produced illustrations for notable publications, including Mitchell's Anatomy of the Autonomous Nervous System and Israel's Atlas of Pathological Haematology. Davison would sketch in the operating theatre, and tidy up her illustrations later.

In 1939, the University of Manchester sought to offer Davison a formal contract as a Medical Artist, but the onset of the war prevented this from happening until 1945. During the war, with less medical work available owing to the altered priorities of practitioners, she spent most of her time working for the University of Manchester's Geography department, drawing and cataloguing maps. In 1945, Davison took up her post at the Manchester Royal Infirmary, where she continued to work until her retirement in 1957.

Davison used the 'Ross board technique', developed by Max Brödel while at Johns Hopkins School of Medicine, and introduced to British artists by Audrey J. Arnott. One of the first artists in the UK to employ it, she was, however, skilled in a range of techniques. The Ross board technique, also known as the carbon dust technique, involves drawing with a carbon pencil onto a white coated stippled 'Ross board', and building up its three-dimensional form with the application of carbon dust. White paint could then be used to create highlights. Works using the technique form the bulk of the work she undertook for Jefferson during the 1930s–1950s.

Davison always emphasised the capacity of medical illustration to clarify and draw attention to the complex and obscure, as opposed to photographs which could merely copy. In a letter written to the British Medical Journal in 1953, she argued for 'the special province of the artist in research work, reconstruction, and interpretation,' as opposed to that of the photographer:

The camera cannot think, the artist must; science as well as art goes to the making of a medical drawing. Because the artist is always seeking to show essentials clearly, and to elucidate difficult and obscure points, he is especially useful to students.

From the early 1940s, Davison trained a large number of aspiring medical artists in Manchester, a condition of her employment at the Royal Infirmary.

== Medical Artists' Association ==
In 1948, Davison began working to establish the Medical Artists' Association of Great Britain, seeking support from other medical artists, including Zita Stead, Audrey J. Arnott, Margaret McLarty, and Clifford Shepley. The Association's inaugural meeting was held in Oxford on 2 April 1949.

In 1963, the MAA instigated a training scheme leading to a postgraduate diploma. This became the recognised qualification for medical artists in Britain, and remains the most accepted route into the profession.

== Writing ==
Davison was the author of four works related to prehistory. In 1927, she published Days and Ways of Early Man, which one review called "a marked advance in the art of popular presentation of difficult and highly technical matter". It went on:

She has covered essential facts and theory from the beginning of things down to Azilo-Tardenoisian times. Her book is simple enough in argument and language to be comprehensible by a child of average intelligence of the age of, say, twelve, while the narrative is sufficiently interesting and picturesque as to make a child of that age want to read it. This is true even, when dealing with such a topic as the psychology underlying palaeolithic art, which introduces an entirely alien point of view. It must not be thought, however, that this is a book for children only. It covers the latest discoveries, and as an introduction to prehistory it is as good, if not better than many a more pretentious work.

In 1934, she published Men of the Dawn: the Story of Man's Evolution to the End of the Old Stone Age (part of the Thinker's Library). This was described as an 'excellent little book' which dealt 'with the evolution of the primates up to man and the skeletal remains and culture of Palaeolithic man,' giving special attention 'to the art of the old Stone Age and the recent discoveries in Africa'.

== Later years ==
Davison retired from her role at the University of Manchester in 1957 but remained active in the Medical Artists' Association. She died in Manchester on 4 February 1984.
