= Captain John =

Captain John may refer to:

- John Clifton Wright, Capt. John, best selling author of books on America's Great Loop
- John Cameron (chief) (1764-1828) a Chief of the Mississauga Nation, known for signing treaties with the Crown
- Captain John (Paiute), a Paiute leader at Mono Lake, California
- Captain John's Harbour Boat Restaurant, a prominent floating restaurant in Toronto for several decades
