= Herbert Henry Woollard =

Australian academic, anatomist and army medical officer

Herbert Henry Woollard, FRS (2 August 1889 – 18 January 1939) was an Australian academic, anatomist and army medical officer.

Woollard was born in Horsham, Victoria and educated at the University of Melbourne, where he was awarded an MD.

When the First World War started in 1914 he enlisted in the Australian Army Medical Corps (A.A.M.C.) and was appointed Regimental Medical Officer to the 2nd Field Artillery Brigade at Gallipoli. He later served with the A.A.M.C. in France and was wounded at the Battle of Pozières. At the end of the war he was awarded the Croix de Guerre and demobilised in London.

After studying surgery for the Royal College of Surgeons examination he decided to become an anatomist and took a post as anatomy lecturer at University College London. He was also able to spend some time in America in 1921 on a Rockefeller scholarship doing investigative work at Johns Hopkins Medical School. From 1923 to 1927 he was assistant professor of anatomy at University College, London and then, after two years as Professor of Anatomy and Histology at the University of Adelaide(1928–29) and seven years as Professor of Anatomy at St Bartholomew's Hospital Medical College, London (1929–36), was appointed Professor of Anatomy at the University of London, where he was awarded a DSc. During these two roles, he collaborated with medical artist Zita Stead. Woolard was also editor of the Journal of Anatomy between 1936 and 1938.

He was elected a Fellow of the Royal Society in 1938 for, as his application citation said, he was "distinguished for his researches in Human and Comparative Anatomy, Neurology and Physical Anthropology".

He died in London, England in 1939. He had married Mary Wilson Howard and had two sons.

== Published works ==
- Anatomy of 'Tarsius spectrum' (1925, Proc Zool Soc p 1071)
- The Retina and Lateral Geniculate Body in Tarsius, etc (1929, Journ of Anat LXI p 414)
- Anthropology and Blood Grouping with special reference to the Australian Aborigines (1929, Man p 181)
- Innervation of Blood Vessels (1926, Heart, XIII p 319)
- Innervation of the Heart (1926, Journ of Anat LX p 345)
- The Innervation of the Ocular Muscles (1931, Journ of Anat LXV, p 215)
- The Growth of the Brain in the Australian Aboriginal (1931, Journ of Anat LXV p 224)
- Recent Advances in Anatomy (Churchill), 1929.
- Woollard, H.H. (1932), "Beri Beri and Neuritis", The Australian Journal of Experimental Biology and Medical Science, Vol.9, No.1, (January 1932), pp. 173-178.

== See also ==
- Grafton Elliot Smith
- Joseph Lexden Shellshear
- Frederic Wood Jones
- John Irvine Hunter
