= Jackie Wright (disambiguation) =

Jackie Wright (1905–1989) was a British comedian.

Jackie Wright may also refer to:

- Jackie Wright (footballer) (1926–2005), English footballer

== See also ==
- Jacky Wright, British technology executive
- Jack Wright (disambiguation)
