= Jack Wright =

Jack Wright is the name of:

== In sport ==
- Jack Wright (American football) (1871–1931), head football coach at the University of Washington
- Jack Wright (footballer) (1878–1968), Australian footballer for Geelong
- Jack Wright (rugby union, born 1999), Australian rugby union player
- Jack Wright (rugby union, born 1910) (1910–2003), English rugby union player
- Jack Wright (tennis) (1901–1949), Canadian tennis player
- Jackie Wright (footballer) (1926-2005), English footballer who played for Blackpool

== Others ==
- Jack Wright (character), the hero of a popular series of Victorian science fiction stories by Luis Senarens
- Jack Wright (greyhound trainer) (1850–1929)
- Jack Wright (diplomat) (1909-1990), New Zealand diplomat
- Jack Wright (politician) (1927–1998), Australian politician
- Jackie Wright (1900s–1989), Irish comedian and performer on The Benny Hill Show

== See also ==
- John Wright (disambiguation)
- John Wright (footballer, born 1878), Irish footballer for Cliftonville and Huddersfield known as 'Jack'
