= Jonathan Wright =

Jonathan Wright may refer to:

- Jonathan Wright (historian) (born 1969), British historian and author
- Jonathan B. Wright (born 1986), American actor
- Jonathan C. Wright (born 1966), Illinois politician and Logan County State's Attorney
- Jonathan Wright (rugby league) (born 1987), Australian NRL player
- Jonathan Wright (cricketer) (born 1965), English cricketer
- Jonathan Wright (translator), British journalist and literary translator
- Jonathan Jasper Wright (1840–1885), African American lawyer and judge in the State of South Carolina

== See also ==
- John Wright (disambiguation)
