= Carey Coombs murmur =

Clinical sign

The Carey Coombs murmur or Coombs murmur is a clinical sign which occurs in patients with mitral valvulitis due to acute rheumatic fever. It is described as a short, mid-diastolic rumble best heard at the apex, which disappears as the valvulitis improves. It is often associated with an S_{3} gallop rhythm, and can be distinguished from the diastolic murmur of mitral stenosis by the absence of an opening snap before the murmur. It is audible at apex. The murmur is caused by increased blood flow across a thickened mitral valve.

The sign is named after Carey Coombs who was a British cardiologist.
