= John Wright (sociologist) =

American sociologist (born 1946)

John S. Wright
- Born: 1946 (age 79–80)

Academic background
- Education: University of Minnesota (BA, MA, PhD)

Academic work
- Discipline: African American & African Studies
- Institutions: University of Minnesota

John Samuel Wright (born 1946) is an American sociologist and professor emeritus of African American and African studies and English at the University of Minnesota. He founded the Department of African American and African Studies at the university in 1969.

== Books ==
- Shadowing Ralph Ellison. University Press of Mississippi, 2006.
- Gordon Parks Centennial: His Legacy at Wichita State University
- A Stronger Soul Within a Finer Frame: Portraying Afro-Americans in the Black Renaissance
