= John P. Wright (philosopher) =

American philosopher (born 1942)

- Born: 1942 (age 83–84)

Education
- Education: York University (PhD)
- Thesis: Mind and External Existence: An Analytical-Historical Study of a Problem of Humean Metaphysics (1975)

Philosophical work
- Era: 21st-century philosophy
- Region: Western philosophy
- Institutions: Central Michigan University
- Main interests: Hume, Descartes, John Locke

John Prentice Wright (born 1942) is an American philosopher and Emeritus Professor of Philosophy at Central Michigan University. He is known for his works on the philosophies of Descartes, Locke and Hume.

== Books ==
- The Sceptical Realism of David Hume (Manchester and Minnesota University Presses, 1983)
- Hume and Hume’s Connections, edited with M.A. Stewart (Edinburgh University Press, 1994)
