= Arthur Rendle Short =

Arthur Rendle Short (6 January 1880 – 14 September 1953) was a professor of surgery at Bristol University and author.

== Early life ==
Rendle Short was born in Bristol, the son of E. Rendle Short, the director of Fry's Chocolate. Arthur's academic achievements included a First class honours in geology, anatomy and also obstetrics.

== Career ==
Rendle Short was ex-Hunterian professor of the Royal College of Surgeons and was Professor of Surgery at the University of Bristol until he retired in 1948. The Times goes on to describe him as "a simple-minded man, in the sense that he never saw evil in anyone."

Rendle Short wrote various medical books, and many books on Christian apologetics, with a special interest in creation and evolution. He was a member of the Plymouth Brethren and also a much-in-demand speaker in Brethren and InterVarsity Fellowship (I.V.F.) circles.

The Times described him as being a "clear thinker, with quick perception", very direct in his manner, and someone who loved the countryside.

== Personal life ==
Like his father, he became a member of the Plymouth Brethren. Arthur was also a founder of the "Inter-Varsity Fellowship", a worldwide Christian organisation for University students. Whilst visiting European cities for medical conferences he also often took the opportunity to speak to students about his Christian beliefs.

He married Helen Case, and they had one son and two daughters, all of whom became medics.

His son Tyndale John Rendle-Short (1919–2010) AM FRCP, was Professor Emeritus at the University of Queensland and specialised in child autism. He was-well known as a creationist, converting late in life after decades as a theistic evolutionist. He favoured day-age creationism.

== Beliefs ==
Rendle Short had many problems reconciling the discoveries of Darwin with his beliefs as a member of the Brethren. His son wrote:

How could the Fall of man have brought sin and death into the world, if the fossils were showing a creation ‘groaning’ for millions of years before man? How could man be both a rising ape and a fallen image? These were agonizing questions for my father.

== Published works ==
- The principles of Christians called "Open Brethren", by a younger brother, (1914) Glasgow, Pickering & Inglis
- The Historic Faith in the Light of Today, (1922)
- Young Believers and Assembly Life, etc, (1925) London, Pickering & Inglis
- The Bible and Modern Research, (1933)
- Why Believe?, (1938/1951)
- Modern Discovery and the Bible, (1942)
- Wonderfully Made, (1951)
- The Bible and Modern Medicine, (1951)
- Archaeology gives Evidence, (1951)
- The Rock Beneath, (1955)

== See also ==
- W. Melville Capper, Douglas Johnson (1954). Arthur Rendle Short: Surgeon and Christian. Inter Varsity Fellowship.
- T. John Rendle-Short (1998). Green Eye of the Storm. Banner of Truth Trust., ISBN 978-0851517278: A biography of the ideas of four scientists who were Christians and their different interactions with Darwinism: Philip Gosse, George Romanes, the author's father Arthur Rendle Short, and the author himself, John Rendle-Short.
