= Carey Coombs =

British cardiologist

Carey Franklin Coombs
- Born: 5 September 1879; Castle Cary, Frome, Somerset, England
- Died: 9 December 1932 (aged 53)

Carey Franklin Coombs (5 September 1879 – 9 December 1932) was an English cardiologist known for his work involving rheumatic heart disease and the eponymous Carey Coombs murmur.

== Early life and education ==
Coombs was born in Castle Cary, Somerset, Frome, England, on 5 September 1879. He received his early education at University College in Bristol. He then attended medical school at St. Mary's Hospital Medical School and was awarded his M.B. in 1901, M.D. in 1903. He then returned to Bristol to enter private practice.

He was made a Fellow of the Royal College of Physicians in 1917. He became a physician at Bristol General Hospital in 1920 and director of the Bristol University Centre of Cardiac Research in 1927. During World War I he was a major in the Royal Army Medical Corps and served in England, Egypt, Mesopotamia and France.

== Contributions to medicine ==
He is best known for his work involving rheumatic and coronary heart disease. He performed important studies of rheumatic fever, and described a rumbling mid-diastolic cardiac murmur that occurs in the acute phase of rheumatic fever. This cardiac murmur is now referred to as the "Carey Coombs murmur". In 1910 he made one of the earliest diagnoses of coronary thrombosis, and before his death in 1932, he had documented 144 cases of this condition.

His most well known written work is "Rheumatic Heart Disease", a book that was published in 1924. He is also remembered for his work in the management and prevention of childhood heart disease. In 1930 he delivered the Lumleian Lectures to the Royal College of Physicians.

== Later years and death ==
Coombs died on 9 December 1932. Coombs had been suffering from chest pain and prescribed bed rest. He subsequently died suddenly and a post mortem examination of the heart revealed that he likely died from a Stokes–Adams attack and a possible massive pulmonary embolism.
