= Andy Brownrigg =

English former professional footballer

Andrew Brownrigg
Personal information
- Full name: Andrew David Brownrigg
- Date of birth: 2 August 1976 (age 50)
- Place of birth: Chapeltown, Sheffield, England
- Positions: Defender; midfielder

Youth career
- Hereford United

Senior career*
Years	Team	Apps	(Gls)
1994–1995	Hereford United	8	(0)
1995–1997	Norwich City	0	(0)
1995–1996	→Kettering Town (loan)	14	(0)
1997–1998	Rotherham United	0	(0)
1997–1998	→Stalybridge Celtic (loan)	16	(0)
1998	Yeovil Town	0	(0)
1998	Stalybridge Celtic	10	(0)
1998–1999	Stocksbridge Park Steels	29	(4)
1999–2000	Kidderminster Harriers	20	(3)
2000	Greenock Morton	2	(0)
2000–2001	Hartlepool United	0	(0)
- * Club domestic league appearances and goals

Andrew David Brownrigg (born 2 August 1976) is an English former professional footballer who played as a defender and midfielder. He made appearances in the English Football League with Hereford United and also played extensively in non-league football.

== Career ==
Brownrigg began his career with Hereford United, making his debut during the 1994–95 season. In March 1995, after just eight league games, he was transferred to Norwich City for £100,000. He spent part of the following season on loan to Kettering Town and moved to Rotherham United in 1997. He was an unused substitute for Norwich in a Premier League match against Arsenal at Highbury on 1 April 1995.

After being named on the bench for Rotherham’s opening game of the 1997–98 season, his career was disrupted by a violent assault in which he suffered severe facial injuries. Following a spell out, he joined Stalybridge Celtic on loan and was released at the end of the season.

Brownrigg went on to play for a number of clubs including Yeovil Town, Stocksbridge Park Steels, and Kidderminster Harriers, with whom he won the Football Conference title in 1999.

He later played in Scotland with Greenock Morton, before returning to England to appear for clubs including Hartlepool United, Northwich Victoria, Hednesford Town, Gainsborough Trinity, Wakefield & Emley, Maltby Main, Scarborough, Hallam, Buxton, Sheffield, Staveley Miners Welfare, Ossett Albion, Worksop Town and AFC Emley.

== Personal life ==
In June 2008, Brownrigg entered the Sporting Chance Clinic, a facility established by former England international Tony Adams for athletes facing addiction issues.

== Education and research ==
Brownrigg graduated with a First Class Honours Degree in Sport and Exercise Psychology from the University of Huddersfield in July 2009. He was subsequently awarded a PhD scholarship focusing on the transition of professional footballers out of the game.

In 2012, his research on career transition was published in the Qualitative Methods in Psychology: Sport and Performance Bulletin of the British Psychological Society, highlighting psychological adjustment issues faced by footballers leaving the professional game.

In 2015, Brownrigg was awarded a Doctor of Philosophy (PhD) by the University of Huddersfield for his thesis titled “‘I shouldn’t have problems because I’m a footballer’: exploring the lived experiences of career transition in UK male professional footballers”, which examined identity loss, psychological adjustment, and the challenges faced by players during and after their careers.

In 2018, he co-authored an article in Qualitative Research in Sport, Exercise and Health titled "‘You shut up and go along with it’: an interpretative phenomenological study of former professional footballers’ experiences of addiction", which explored the lived experiences of ex-professional players dealing with issues related to alcohol and gambling addiction.
