= QJM =

- Cover of the December 2006 issue
- Discipline: General medicine
- Language: English
- Edited by: Seamas Donnelly

Publication details
- Former name(s): Quarterly Journal of Medicine
- History: 1907–present
- Publisher: Oxford University Press
- Frequency: Monthly
- Impact factor: 2.529 (2021)

Standard abbreviations
- ISO 4: QJM

Indexing
- ISSN: 1460-2725 (print); 1460-2393 (web)
- OCLC no.: 30841057

Links
- Journal homepage

QJM, in the past subtitled Monthly Journal of the Association of Physicians and now An International Journal of Medicine, is a British peer-reviewed medical journal which was established in October 1907 as the Quarterly Journal of Medicine. Originally published quarterly, it changed to being a monthly publication at the beginning of 1985. While retaining its original initials for continuity, its name was changed in recognition of its new frequency of publication.

QJM focuses on internal medicine and publishes articles covering medical science and practice. It includes original scientific papers, editorials, reviews, commentary papers to air controversial issues, and a correspondence column.

The journal is published by Oxford University Press on behalf of the Association of Physicians of Great Britain and Ireland. Its current editor-in-chief is Seamas Donnelly. As of 2024, the journal had an impact factor of 7.3, according to the Journal Citation Reports.
