= John Wright (cricketer, born 1935) =

English cricketer

Personal information
- Full name: John Vaughan Wright
- Born: 31 December 1935 (age 90); Colchester, Essex, England
- Batting: Right-handed

Domestic team information
- Years: Team
- 1962–1967: Essex

Career statistics
Competition	First-class
Matches	4
Runs scored	60
Batting average	10.00
100s/50s	0/0
Top score	40
Catches/stumpings	2/–
- Source: Cricinfo, 27 November 2010

John Vaughan Wright (born 31 December 1935) is a former English cricketer. Wright was a right-handed batsman. He was born at Colchester, Essex.

Wright made his first-class debut for Essex in the 1962 County Championship against Northamptonshire. He played one further first-class match during that season against Warwickshire, before playing 2 further first-class matches in 1967 against Middlesex and the touring Pakistanis. In his 4 first-class matches he scored 60 runs at a batting average of 10.00, with a high score of 40. In the field he took two catches.
