= John N. Wright =

American philosopher

Philosophical work
- Era: 21st-century philosophy
- Region: Western philosophy
- Institutions: LaTrobe University
- Main interests: philosophy of science

John N. Wright is a philosopher and Adjunct Research Fellow in Philosophy at LaTrobe University. Previously he was Senior Lecturer at the University of Newcastle. He is known for his works on philosophy of science.

== Books ==
- An Epistemic Foundation for Scientific Realism: Defending Realism Without Inference to the Best Explanation. Springer. 2018
- Where Did Fair Go?: On the Social and Moral Cost of Growing Inequality, Australian Scholarly Publishing 2014
- Explaining Science's Success: Understanding How Scientific Knowledge Works, Acumen, 2013
- Ethics of Economic Rationalism, University of New South Wales Press 2002
- Realism and Explanatory Priority. Springer. 1997
- Science and the Theory of Rationality. Aldershot, Hants, England: Avebury. 1991
