= Bristol Medico-Chirurgical Society =

Medical society in Bristol, England

The Bristol Medico-Chirurgical Society is a medical society in Bristol, England. It publishes a journal, The West of England Medical Journal, that was first published as the Bristol Medico-Chirurgical Journal in 1883 and also as The Medical Journal of the South-West.
