= Daniel Dougal =

English gynaecologist (1884–1948)

Daniel Dougal MC, Croix de Guerre, FRCOG (1884-1948) was a gynaecologist at the Manchester Royal Infirmary, the Northern Hospital for Women and Children and also St Mary's Hospital. During the First World War he served as an officer with the Royal Army Medical Corps and was awarded the Military Cross, the Croix de Guerre, and was mentioned in despatches. He was a founding fellow of the Royal College of Obstetricians and Gynaecologists.
