= Shaun Carey =

Footballer (born 1976)

Personal information
- Full name: Shaun Peter Carey
- Date of birth: 13 May 1976 (age 50)
- Place of birth: Kettering, England
- Position: Midfielder

Youth career
- 1994–1995: Norwich City

Senior career*
Years	Team	Apps	(Gls)
1995–2000	Norwich City	68	(0)
2000–2002	Rushden & Diamonds	41	(1)
2001–2002	→Stevenage Borough (loan)	3	(0)
2002–2004	Chester City	51	(1)
2004–2005	Hornchurch	6	(0)
2005	Weymouth	2	(0)
2005	Droylsden	4	(0)
2005–2008	King's Lynn	28	(2)
2008–	Spalding United		

International career
1996	Republic of Ireland U21	2	(0)
- * Club domestic league appearances and goals

Shaun Peter Carey (born 13 May 1976) is a former professional footballer who played as a midfielder. He began his career with Norwich City before playing for Rushden & Diamonds, Stevenage Borough, Chester City, Hornchurch, Weymouth, Droylsden and King's Lynn. Born in England, he made two appearances for the Republic of Ireland U21 national team. Carey was also assistant manager to Keith Webb at King's Lynn and led the side to the FA Cup second round when caretaker manager in 2006–07.

Carey made his debut for Norwich as a substitute on 20 September 1995 in a Football League Cup match against Torquay at Carrow Road. He was released by the club in 2000 having made 76 appearances.

He represented the Republic of Ireland at under-21 level and won Football Conference championship medals at both Rushden and Chester. He was awarded a benefit game between King's Lynn and Norwich in October 2006 when out injured with a double fracture of his leg.Now a sports teacher and U14s academy coach for Peterborough United.

== Sources ==
- Mark Davage; John Eastwood; Kevin Platt (2001). Canary Citizens. Jarrold Publishing. ISBN 0-7117-2020-7.
