= Pituitrin =

Hormone formerly used in obstetrics

Pituitrin is a proprietary name for an extract of bovine posterior pituitary hormones (i.e. oxytocin and vasopressin) formerly used in obstetrics and since displaced by purer preparations. It was used for the induction of labor prior to birth and for the treatment of post-partum hemorrhage (from vasopressin's vasoconstrictive properties).
