= John Wright (cricketer, born 1861) =

English cricketer

Personal information
- Full name: John Wright
- Born: 23 September 1861; Nantwich, Cheshire, England
- Died: 23 December 1912 (aged 51); Willaston, Cheshire, England
- Batting: Right-handed
- Bowling: Right-arm fast-medium

Domestic team information
- Years: Team
- 1895: Cheshire

Career statistics
Competition	First-class
Matches	1
Runs scored	3
Batting average	1.50
100s/50s	–/–
Top score	3
Balls bowled	12
Wickets	0
Bowling average	–
5 wickets in innings	–
10 wickets in match	–
Best bowling	–
Catches/stumpings	–/–
- Source: Cricinfo, 27 February 2019

John Wright (23 September 1861 – 23 December 1912) was an English first-class cricketer.

Wright was born at Nantwich. Described as "A fast round-armed bowler, rather uncertain; a good bat, and fields well near the wicket", Wright made a single appearance in first-class cricket for the North of England in the North v South match at Lord's in 1885, played in benefit of the family of Fred Morley. Batting twice during the match, Wright was dismissed for 3 runs by W. G. Grace, while in their second-innings he was dismissed without scoring by Arnold Fothergill. He later played minor counties cricket for Cheshire in 1895, making one appearance against Worcestershire.

He was employed in various jobs during his life at Manchester, Stockport, Weston-super-Mare, Nelson, and Sale. He died at Willaston in December 1912.
