= Journal of the American College of Surgeons =

- Discipline: Surgery
- Language: English
- Edited by: Timothy J. Eberlein

Publication details
- Former name(s): Surgery, Gynecology & Obstetrics
- History: 1905-present
- Impact factor: 6.532 (2021)

Standard abbreviations
- ISO 4: J. Am. Coll. Surg.

Indexing
- ISSN: 1072-7515 (print); 1879-1190 (web)

Links
- Journal homepage; Online archive

The Journal of the American College of Surgeons is a monthly peer-reviewed medical journal covering research in the field of surgery and is the official journal of the American College of Surgeons. The journal publishes original research and clinical studies, review articles, and experimental investigations with clear clinical relevance. The editor-in-chief is Timothy J. Eberlein. It has been published continuously since 1905 and was first titled Surgery, Gynecology & Obstetrics. According to the Journal Citation Reports, the journal has a 2021 impact factor of 6.532.
