= British Journal of Surgery =

- Discipline: Surgery
- Language: English
- Edited by: Des Winter

Publication details
- History: 1913–present
- Publisher: Oxford University Press (U.K.)
- Frequency: monthly
- Impact factor: 8.6 (2023)

Standard abbreviations
- ISO 4: Br. J. Surg.

Indexing
- CODEN: BJSUAM
- ISSN: 0007-1323

Links
- Journal homepage

BJS is a peer-reviewed surgical journal featuring high-quality research, education, and debate with a 2023 impact factor of 8.8 - current time to first decision is only 17 days for most submissions. A broad range of article types is available to suit most authors looking to submit in the following specialty areas:

Acute Care Surgery; Breast; Cardiothoracic Surgery; Education; Endocrine; Experimental Science; General; Hernia; HPB; Lower GI; Orthopaedics; Paediatric Surgery; Plastic Surgery; Transplantation; Trauma; Upper GI; Urology; Vascular

It has been published since 1913 and is currently published by Oxford University Press.

In 2021 they established their new education arm BJS Academy and in 2022 launched the new BJS Academy website to provide surgeons with learning materials.
