= John Wright (poet) =

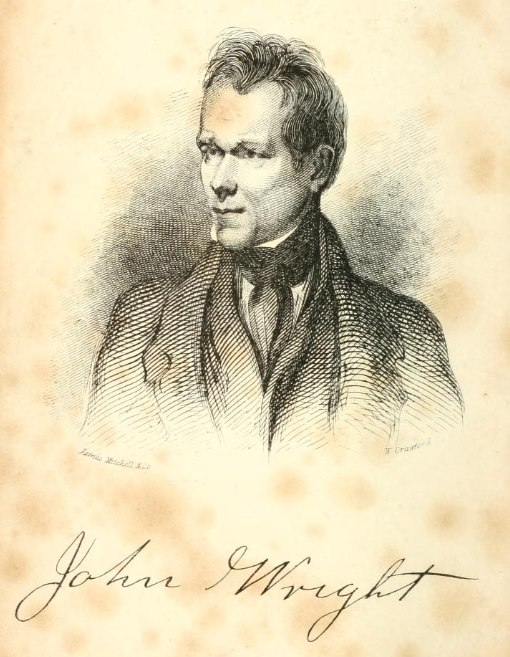
John Wright

John Wright (1805–1844), was a Scots poet.

== Biography ==
Wright born on 1 September 1805, at the farmhouse of Auchencloigh in the parish of Sorn, Ayrshire, was the fourth child of James Wright of Galston in the same county, a coal-driver, by his wife, Grizzle Taylor (died December 1842) of Mauchline. While he was still a child his parents removed to Galston, where he received a few months' schooling and learned to read, but not to write. He gave evidence of powers of memory by reciting the whole of the 119th Psalm in the Sabbath school to the discomfort of his audience. From the age of seven he assisted his father in driving coals, and at thirteen he was apprenticed to George Brown, a Galston weaver, a man of cultivated mind, who assisted his education and placed books at his disposal.

While still a youth Wright composed fifteen hundred lines of a tragedy entitled "Mahomet, or the Hegira", which he was forced to retain in his memory until he learned to write at the age of seventeen. In 1824 he proceeded to Glasgow, carrying with him The Retrospect and some smaller poems. On his arrival he saw John Struthers and Dugald Moore, who approved his work and assisted him to go to Edinburgh. There he found patrons in Christopher North and Henry Glassford Bell, who helped him to obtain a publisher. The Retrospect appeared in 1825, and was lauded by the Quarterly Review and the Monthly Review, as well as by Scottish journals. Some shorter poems which were published with it had the higher honour of being praised by Sir Walter Scott.

Wright settled at Cambuslang, near Glasgow, where he married Margaret Chalmers, granddaughter of the parish schoolmaster, and worked as a weaver. Finding his means scanty he printed a second edition of the Retrospect two or three years later, and made a tour through Scotland selling copies. He found that his fame was extensive, and the discovery was his ruin. The hospitality he received encouraged habits of intemperance which, a few months after his return to Cambuslang, completely mastered him. He was separated from his wife, and lived in poverty and wretchedness. In 1843 he made a determined effort to regulate his life. His friends assisted him by publishing at Ayr The Whole Poetical Works of John Wright. Unfortunately, his reformation was either transient or too late, for he died in a Glasgow hospital a few months later. He had a genuine poetic gift and an intense appreciation of natural beauty. His more ambitious pieces were marred by an artificial imitation of Lord Byron, but his shorter poems, reflecting the emotions of his own life, were happier.

== Works ==
- 1825 The Retrospect. Canto II.
- 1830 Lines composed over Robert Fergusson's Grave.
- 1830 The Retrospect.
