= John Wright (footballer, born 1916) =

English footballer (1916–1999)

Personal information
- Full name: John Wright
- Date of birth: 30 April 1916
- Place of birth: Blackhall Colliery, England
- Date of death: 1999 (aged 83)
- Place of death: Doncaster, England
- Height: 5 ft 11 in (1.80 m)
- Position: Left half

Youth career
- 19??–1934: Easington Colliery Welfare

Senior career*
Years	Team	Apps	(Gls)
1933–1934	Hartlepools United	0	(0)
1934–1937	Derby County	0	(0)
1937–1939	Darlington	37	(4)
1939–194?	Denaby United		
- * Club domestic league appearances and goals

John Wright (30 April 1916 – 1999) was an English footballer who made 37 appearances in the Football League for Darlington, playing mainly as a left half. He was on the books of Hartlepools United and Derby County without playing for either in the League, and joined Midland League club Denaby United just before the start of the Second World War.

== Football career ==
At schoolboy level, Wright played for East Durham Schools and for the Durham County Schools team. He made several appearances for Hartlepools United's reserve team in the North-Eastern League in the 1933–34 season, and, after making the pass for the winning goal for Easington Colliery Welfare's junior team in the North East Divisional Junior Cup final, he signed professional forms with First Division club Derby County in May 1934. He remained with the club for three seasons, but never made an appearance in the Football League.

In 1937 he returned to his native north-east and signed for Darlington of the Third Division North. He went straight into the starting eleven, making his club and Football League debut on 28 August in a 1–0 win at home to Southport. He soon lost his place to Joe Hodgson, but regained it because of injuries for a home match against Bradford City in mid-October; Darlington won 4–1, and Wright scored the second goal from 25 yards (23 m). Wright established himself at left half in the last three months of the season, taking his appearance total up to 30 matches, but he played only infrequently in 1938–39 and was not retained.

He signed for Denaby United, began the 1939–40 Midland League season at centre half, and was able to continue for a time with Denaby in their wartime competitions.

== Personal life ==
Wright was born in Blackhall Colliery, County Durham, the elder son of Arthur Wright and his wife. He married Doris Wilson at St Andrew's Church, Blackhall, in January 1938. The 1939 Register lists the couple living at Conisbrough, West Riding of Yorkshire, and gives his occupation as bricklayer's labourer. Wright's death was registered in the Doncaster district, which included Conisbrough, in the third quarter of 1999.

While bathing in the sea near Blackhall Rocks in July 1936, Wright was reported to have saved another young man, the brother of footballer Albert Harris, from drowning.
