= Johnny Wright (footballer) =

Northern Ireland footballer

Personal information
- Full name: Jonathan Wright
- Date of birth: 24 November 1975 (age 50)
- Place of birth: Belfast, Northern Ireland
- Position: Defender

Senior career*
| Years | Team | Apps | (Gls) |
| 1994–1997 | Norwich City | 7 | (0) |
- Wroxham
- Glenavon
- Ards

International career
- Northern Ireland B
- * Club domestic league appearances and goals

Jonathan Wright (born 24 November 1975) is a former professional footballer who played for Norwich City.

Born in Northern Ireland, Wright made five starts and two substitute appearances for Norwich, in a City career that stretched from 1994 to 1997. Notably, in his last three professional appearances (October to December 1996), 18 goals were scored (a 4-1 victory and 5-1 and 6-1 defeats).

Wright was capped by the Northern Ireland "B" team.

After leaving Norwich in 1997 he played non-league football for Wroxham before returning to Northern Ireland where he played for Glenavon and Ards.

Wright has subsequently built a career as a plastic bearings engineer, working at igus.
