= John Clifton Wright =

American writer, sailor and lobbyist (born 1948)

John C. Wright
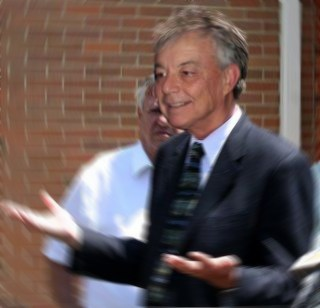
- Born: 1948 (age 77–78); Terrell, Texas, U.S.
- Education: East Texas State College (B.A.)
- Occupations: Author, sailor, lobbyist

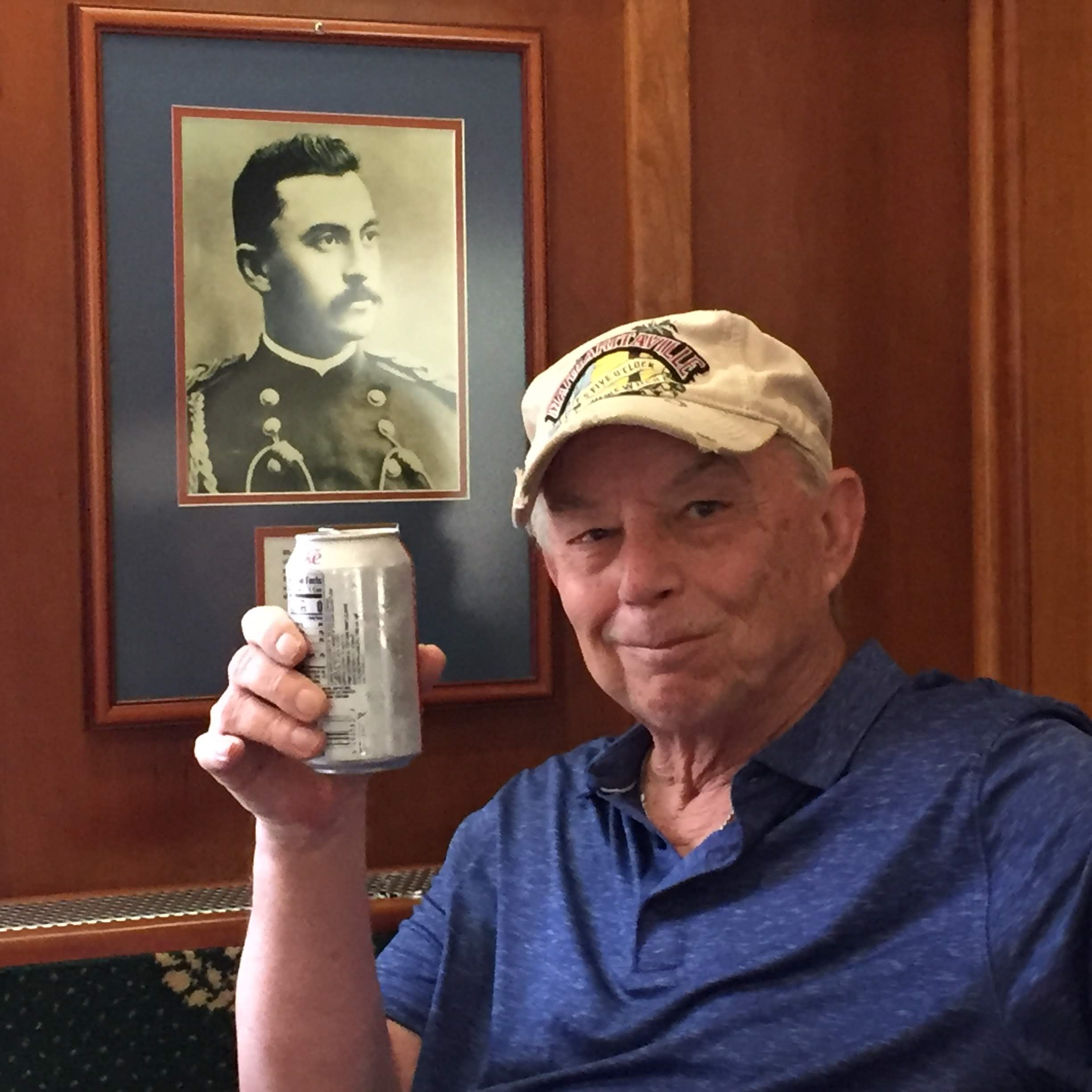
Capt John on his Great Loop boat

John C. Wright is an American author and pioneer of America's Great Loop. Best known in the trades as Capt. John. His first documented voyage around the Loop was completed in 1971. He is best known for his books, articles and public speaking engagements about living aboard and cruising America's Great Loop. His Best-Selling books include "The Looper's Companion Guide", and "More Fun Than Fuel". His "The Looper's Companion Guide" has been awarded "Great Loop Book of the Year" for 6 years from 2019 to 2024. Capt. John maintains a popular website about living aboard and cruising America's Great Loop. Publishers Weekly said he "may be the most influential author of Great Loop books on Market."

== Biography ==
John C. Wright (sailor, author, freelance writer, and motivational speaker,) (born 1948 -) Capt. John is an accomplished sailor and known for his voyages around America's Great Loop. He grew up in Terrell, Texas and attended Terrell High School, Dallas Baptist College, East Texas State College, and served in the U.S. Army during the Vietnam War as CW2 helicopter pilot. Upon returning from the Army, he began his career with Honeywell Information Systems. He retired as Senior Executive and a Registered Lobbyist with Honeywell. Capt. John spends his retirement cruising America's Great Loop. He maintains popular boating articles as well as one of the most popular "Great Loop" websites on the Internet with over 400,000 viewers. He is also an active lobbyist for keeping the Great Loop waterways open for navigation through the Chicago Sanitary and Ship Canal that links the Great Lakes to the Illinois river and the Mississippi river basin, where an Asian Carp invasion threatens a hard lock closure of the USCG's Electronic Fish Barrier on the connecting navigable waterway.

== Books ==
BYOB Bring Your Own Boat Series

- The Looper's Companion Guide(2024)
- Once Around Is Not Enough(2016)
- America's Great Loop and Beyond(2014)
- More Fun than Fuel (2021)
- Looping By The Numbers(2022)
- The Frugal Voyager (2011)
