= Medical Artists Association of Great Britain =

Professional body for medical artists

- Website: maa.org.uk

The Medical Artists Association of Great Britain (MAA) was founded on 2 April 1949 by British medical illustrators Dorothy Davison, Audrey Arnott and Margaret McLarty to act as a professional body for medical artists and to raise the standard of medical art through training, education and examinations. Arnott acted as the association's first Secretary, and the first chairman was D.H. Tompsett, surgeon and later author of Anatomical Techniques, published in 1956.

The association started out as four departments in London, Manchester and Edinburgh and it took students or trainee/assistants during the 1940s and 1950s. By 1962 the association had started its own postgraduate programme to train graduate artists. In 1989, forty years after its foundation, the association received the patronage of the Worshipful Company of Barbers, one of the City of London livery companies, and by the same year students were able to register at a medical school within London University to take a university diploma course.

A year later in 1990, the Association became a limited company continuing to train artists looking for a career in medical illustration. In the 1996, the Association received the Charlotte Holt Bequest created by medical artist Charlotte Holt for the express purpose of training medical artists. This led to the establishment of the Medical Artists' Education Trust (MAET), a charitable organisation tasked with managing the Association's specialist Postgraduate Training Programme.

Today, the Association is the professional body for Medical Artists in the UK with its members possessing specialist skills in art and a deep, if not professional, understanding of medical procedures specifically, but not exclusively, in the area of surgery.

Chairman	Term
Joanna Cameron	2025–Present
Philip Ferguson Jones	2023–2025
Pascale Pollier-Green	2021–2023
Philip Ball	2019–2021
Philip Wilson	2016–2019
Gillian Lee	2014–2016
Philip Ball	2012–2014
Philip Wilson	2010–2012
Philip Ball	2007–2010
Jenny Halstead	2005–2007
Anthony Rollason	2003–2005
Richard Neave	2001–2003
Philip Wilson	1999–2001
Keith Harrison	1997–1999
Keith Harrison	1995–1997
Kevin Marks	1993–1995
Pat Archer	1990–1993
Peter Cull	1988–1990
Richard Neave	1986–1988
Pat Archer	1984–1986
Peter Cull	1982–1984
Robin Callander	1980–1982
Peter Cull	1977–1980
Gabriel Donald	1951–1977
David Tompsett	1949–1951
