= John Wright (footballer, born 1878) =

Irish footballer

James Wright
Personal information
- Full name: John Wright
- Date of birth: 1878
- Place of birth: Ireland
- Date of death: Unknown
- Position: Defender

Senior career*
Years	Team	Apps	(Gls)
- Cliftonville
1910–1911	Huddersfield Town	2	(0)

International career
1906-07	Ireland	6	(0)
- * Club domestic league appearances and goals

John "Jack" Wright (born 1878 in Ireland) was an Irish professional footballer, who played for Cliftonville and Huddersfield Town. He was also capped by and captained the Irish national football team.

Before and after his football career Wright served in the British armed forces in the Boer War, in the Royal Irish Rifles, and later in The Great War, in the North Irish Horse, reaching the final rank of regimental sergeant major (temporary) in 1918.
