= John Wright (bookseller died 1844) =

English bookseller, author, editor and publisher

John Wright (1770?–1844) was an English bookseller, author, editor and publisher.

== Early life ==
Wright was born in 1770 or 1771, the son of a clerk in a manufacturing house at Norwich. He was apprenticed to his uncle, J. Roper, a silk mercer, but he disliked trade, and at the expiry of his indentures went to London to seek for literary employment.

== Literary employment ==
Wright obtained an engagement as foreman or superintendent at Hookham's rooms in Bond Street, and afterwards entered business on his own account as a bookseller at 169 Piccadilly, opposite Old Bond Street. His shop became the general morning resort of the friends of Pitt's ministry, as Debrett's was of the opposition. In 1797 George Canning, John Hookham Frere and others, projected the Anti-Jacobin, or, Weekly Examiner. They took a lease of 168 Piccadilly, the next house to Wright's, which was vacant on account of the failure of J. Owen, the publisher of Burke's pamphlets, and made over the house to Wright, reserving to themselves the first floor. By means of a door in the partition wall they passed from Wright's shop to the editorial room without attracting notice. The Anti-Jacobin appeared first on 20 November 1797, under the editorship of William Gifford, and was continued until 9 July 1798. The journal was distinguished for the vigour of its attacks on its opponents, and Wright's shop was the scene of the attempt of John Wolcot, better known as Peter Pindar, to chastise Gifford with a cudgel for his severe reflections on his character and writings.

== Association with William Cobbett ==
Wright's political connections brought him into contact with William Cobbett, then at the height of his earlier fame as a Tory martyr. While Cobbett was still in America, Wright acted as his agent in London, and when he came to England in 1800 he gave him lodging in his house. In 1802 Wright failed in his business. He had started with little money, and, according to Cobbett, the publication of the Anti-Jacobin brought him more notoriety than remuneration. By his failure he found himself seriously in Cobbett's debt, and he received little mercy. In 1803 he was confined in the Fleet at the suit of his creditor. At a later time Cobbett asserted and Wright denied that the committal was by mutual arrangement. At any rate, he was released in a few weeks on terms which made him Cobbett's hack and forced him to follow his master in 1804 in his change of politics. He took rooms at a tailor's at 5 Panton Square, Westminster, but during Cobbett's frequent absences from town he lived at his house at 15 Duke Street, Westminster, looked after his domestic affairs, and superintended the publication of the Weekly Political Register. According to Thomas Curson Hansard, he received no remuneration for these services, and was denied even postal expenses unless he produced the back of every twopenny post letter which he received.

He was chiefly employed, however, as editor of Cobbett's Parliamentary History, Cobbett's Parliamentary Debates and Cobbett's State Trials. Of the two former he took entire charge, but the last was entrusted to Thomas Bayly Howell as sub-editor. To Wright were assigned by a verbal agreement two-thirds of the profits on the Debates and half the profits on the Parliamentary History and the State Trials. Cobbett was originally proprietor, but in 1810 he was sentenced to two years' imprisonment for an attack on the government, and during his incarceration a violent dispute arose as to the division of the profits, which was complicated by Wright's raising a claim for remuneration for his other services. The printer Hansard, who sided with Wright, eventually obtained possession of the Parliamentary Debates and the History, removed Cobbett's name from the title-page, and continued Wright in his post of editor. The Parliamentary History appeared in 36 volumes between 1806 and 1820, and dealt with the period previous to 1803, when the series of the 'Debates' began. Wright edited 36 volumes of the Debates between 1812 and 1830, and was then succeeded as editor by Thomas Hodgskin.

Their financial differences produced a lasting enmity between Cobbett and Wright, which was embittered by another circumstance. On Cobbett's release from gaol in 1812 a statement appeared in The Times that he had sought to avoid imprisonment two years before by making his submission to government and offering to suppress the Weekly Register. Wright, who had been privy to Cobbett's overtures, and had endeavoured to dissuade him from them, was unjustly suspected of having betrayed them. The revelation was too damaging to be forgiven. In 1819, while in America, Cobbett published a savage attack on Wright in the Register, alleging that he had detected him falsifying his accounts and describing graphically "the big round drops of sweat that in a cold winter's day rolled down the caitiff's forehead" when his villainy was discovered. Wright obtained £500. damages against William Innell Clement, the bookseller, for publishing the libel, and when Cobbett returned to England he commenced proceedings against him also, and on 11 December 1820 obtained £1,000 damages.

== Editing and death ==
When Wright's connection with the 'Parliamentary Debates' ceased in 1830, he undertook a Biographical Memoir of William Huskisson, a work of considerable merit. He was next employed by the publishers John Murray (1778–1843) and Richard Bentley (1794–1871) in literary work. In 1831 Murray published an edition of Boswell's Life of Johnson, founded on that of John Wilson Croker. The ninth and tenth volumes, consisting of a supplementary collection of contemporary anecdotes concerning Johnson under the title Johnsoniana, were edited by Wright. They appeared in a separate edition in 1836 (London, 8vo). Between 1832 and 1835 he was engaged on the Life and Work of Lord Byron, published by Murray, and in 1835 on the collective edition of Crabbe's Works. Between 1838 and 1840 he assisted William Stanhope Taylor and Captain John Henry Pringle in editing the Correspondence of William Pitt, Earl of Chatham (London, 4 vols. 8vo). He was editor of the first collected edition of Horace Walpole's Letters, which appeared in 1840 (London, 6 vols. 8vo). A revised edition was published in 1844 and a third in 1846. An American edition appeared in Philadelphia in 1842. At the time of his death Wright was engaged in his most important work, the publication of Sir Henry Cavendish's Debates of the House of Commons during the Thirteenth Parliament of Great Britain, commonly called the Unreported Parliament [see Cavendish, Sir Henry]. The original notes, written in shorthand, are contained in forty-eight volumes in the Egerton manuscripts at the British Library. Wright deciphered and transcribed the manuscript as far as 27 March 1771, and supplemented the text with "illustrations of the parliamentary history of the reign of George III", drawn from unpublished letters, private journals, and memoirs. In 1839 he published a preliminary volume, containing the "Debate of the House of Commons on the Bill for the Government of Quebec" (London, 8vo), a subject at that time of considerable interest. The work was approved by Lord Brougham, who, together with Hudson Gurney, assisted Wright financially. Seven parts appeared between 1841 and 1843, which, when bound, formed two volumes (London, 8vo). He died in London on 25 February 1844 at his residence, 26 Osnaburgh Street, Regent's Park, and was buried at the Marylebone parish church.

== Works ==
Two volumes of Cobbett's correspondence with Wright are preserved at the British Library. A third (British Library Add MS 31126) contains letters in the possession of Cobbett, and a statement of his case against Wright in regard to the Parliamentary History and Debates. Wright translated from the German of Alexandre Stanislas de Wimpffen, A Voyage to Saint Domingo in 1788, 1789, and 1790 (London, 1797, 8vo).
