= Margaret McLarty =

British medical illustrator

Margaret Chalmers McLarty, known as Margaret McLarty, (1908–1996) was a medical illustrator for the anaesthetic department in Oxford University. In 1960, she published Illustrating Medicine and Surgery a seminal volume on medical illustration and a core text for medical illustrators. She provided illustrations for the first two editions of Anatomy for Anaesthetists written with Harold Ellis in 1963.

She was trained by Audrey Arnott with whom she founded the Medical Artists Association of Great Britain on 2 April 1949.
