= Audrey Arnott =

British medical illustrator

Audrey Juliet Arnott (1901–1974) was a medical illustrator who worked with the neurosurgeon Hugh Cairns at the London Hospital and followed him to Oxford when he was appointed Nuffield Professor of Surgery in 1939. She founded the Medical Artists Association of Great Britain from her home in Wolvercote in 1949.

== Training ==
When Audrey Arnott graduated from the Royal College of Art, she was employed by Hugh Cairns as an artist. The surgeon arranged for Arnott to be trained at the Academy of Fine Arts in Leipzig as a medical illustrator under Max Brödel, founder of the first 'Department of Art as Applied to Medicine' at Johns Hopkins University in 1911. Brödel taught Arnott the technique of drawing on Ross-board with carbon dust, a method which Arnott later passed onto other British medical illustrators. As Arnott was the only British student of Brödel, she is credited with introducing the technique to United Kingdom.

== Career ==
Arnott accompanied Cairns to the University of Oxford when he opened the neurosurgical department there in 1939. During her time there she produced a number of neurosurgical illustrations for Hugh Cairns, using the Ross-board and carbon dust technique taught to her by Brödel. Her illustrations have been regarded as showing the clarity of black and white photography, intricate in their anatomical, surgical, and pathological detail whilst maintaining a unique artistic style.

== Influence ==
Within the United Kingdom, Arnott was highly influential in the field of medical illustration, training numerous artists in the Ross-board technique, including Margaret McLarty (medical artist for the anaesthetic department). McLarty's later publication Illustrating Medicine and Surgery became a core text for medical illustrators. Arnott and McLarty, with two other illustrators, founded the Medical Artists Association of Great Britain on 2 April 1949. The foundation acts as a professional body for medical artists and raise the standard of medical art through training, education and examinations.
