= Wright =

Surname

Origin
- Meaning: Worker, maker
- Region of origin: England

Wright is an occupational surname originating in England and Scotland. The term 'Wright' comes from the circa 700 AD Old English word wryhta or wyrhta, meaning "worker or shaper of wood". Later, the word referred to any occupational worker and came to be used as a surname.

The word's use as an occupational title continued until the mid-19th century, often combined with other words such as in shipwright, wheelwright, wainwright and playwright. The word carpentier, now carpenter, was introduced into England in the years after the Norman conquest in 1066 and slowly replaced the traditional meaning of wright in most of England. 'Wright' is still used in Scottish English in its original meaning of 'skilled woodworker'. The Incorporation of Wrights of the Trades House of Glasgow, and the Incorporation of Wrights and Masons of Edinburgh Trades retain the word in its original meaning in their role of promoting the woodworking trade.

In 2014, Wright was the eleventh most common surname in England. Wright is also an anglicised version of the Scots Gaelic clan name "MacIntyre" or "Mac an t-Saoir", meaning "son of the wright" (son of the carpenter).

== Notable people with the surname "Wright" include ==
=== A ===
- Ab Wright (1905–1995), American football and baseball player
- Abbie J. Wright (1862–??), American singer
- Abraham Wright (born 1984), American football player
- Abraham Wright (deacon) (1611–1690), English theologian and deacon
- Ada Wright (1862–1939), English suffragist
- Adrian Wright (1947–2015), English-Australian actor
- A. Gilbert Wright (1909–1987), American zoologist
- Akanbi Wright, Nigerian musician
- Akil Wright (born 1996), English footballer
- Alexandra Wright, English rabbi
- Alexis Wright (born 1950), Aboriginal Australian writer
- Alexsandra Wright (born 1971), Canadian actress
- Alfred Wright (1848–1909), Anglican priest
- Alfred Wright (missionary) (1788–1853), American minister
- Allan Wright (1920–2015), English pilot
- Allan Wright (farmer) (1929–2022), New Zealand businessman
- Allen Wright (1826–1885), American native chief
- Allen Wright (journalist) (1932–1997), Scottish art critic and journalist
- Almroth Wright (1861–1947), British immunologist
- Aloma Wright (born 1950), American actress
- Alonzo Wright (1821–1894), Canadian businessman and politician
- Alphonse Wright (1887–1953), Belgian footballer
- Alvin Wright (1961–2018), American football player
- Ambrose R. Wright (1826–1872), American army general
- Amos Wright (1809–1886), Canadian politician
- Amra-Faye Wright (born 1960), South African actress
- Amy Wright, American actress and former model
- Amy Wright (basketball) (born 1980), American basketball coach
- Andre Wright (born 1996), English footballer
- Andrea Wright, American basketball player
- Andwuelle Wright (born 1997), Trinidadian long jumper
- Angela Wright, English businesswoman
- Ann Wright (born 1947), American colonel
- Annemarie Wright (born 1979), English artist
- Anton Wright (born 1974), British adventurer
- Antonia Wright (born 1979), American artist
- Apollo Wright, American football coach
- April Wright, American writer
- Arin Wright (born 1992), American soccer player
- Arlaine Wright, Canadian exercise instructor
- Aron Wright (1810–1885), American physician and educator
- Asher Wright (1803–1875), American missionary

=== B ===
- Bagley Wright (1924–2011), American philanthropist
- Bailey Wright (born 1992), Australian footballer
- Barrie Wright (born 1945), English footballer
- Barry Wright (footballer) (born 1939), Welsh footballer
- Basil Wright (1907–1987), English filmmaker
- Beals Wright (1871–1961), American tennis player
- Beatrice Wright (1910–2003), American-born British politician
- Beatrice Wright (psychologist) (1917–2018), American psychologist
- Bernard Wright (1963–2022), American musician
- Bernie Wright (born 1954), British footballer
- Berny Wright (born 1979), Costa Rican footballer
- Bertha Wright (1876–1971), American nurse
- Bertie Wright (1871–1960), British actor
- Bertie Wright (cricketer) (1897–1955), English cricketer
- Bessie Wright, Scottish healer
- Betsey Wright (born 1943), American political consultant
- Betty Wright (1953–2020), American singer
- Betty Ren Wright (1927–2013), American writer
- Beverly Wright, American environmentalist
- Blanche Fisher Wright (1887–1971), American illustrator
- Bonnie Wright (born 1991), English actress
- Boomer Wright, American politician
- Bracey Wright (born 1984), American basketball player
- Brandon Wright (born 1997), American football player
- Brendan Wright, American musician and songwriter
- Brent Wright (born 1978), American basketball player
- Bricktop Wright (1908–1972), American baseball player
- Brock Wright (born 1998), American football player
- Broderick Wright (born 1987), Australian rugby league footballer
- Bryant Wright, American minister

=== C ===
- Caesar Wright (1904–1967), Canadian jurist
- Caleb Wright (1810–1898), English mill owner and politician
- Caleb Merrill Wright (1908–2001), American judge
- Callum Wright (born 2000), English footballer
- Calvin E. Wright (1908–1988), American politician
- Cam Wright, American politician
- Camille Wright (born 1955), American swimmer
- Campbell Wright (born 2002), New Zealand biathlete
- Carleton H. Wright (1892–1973), American admiral
- Carolann Wright, Canadian politician
- Carolyne Wright (born 1949), American poet
- Carroll D. Wright (1840–1909), American statistician
- Casey Wright (born 1981), American horse trainer
- Casey Wright (skier) (born 1994), Australian skier
- Cathie Wright (1929–2012), American politician
- C. Conrad Wright (1917–2011), American religious historian
- Cedric Wright (1889–1959), American violinist
- Cesare Wright, American filmmaker
- Ceyair Wright (born 2002), American football player
- Chad Wright (born 1991), Jamaican discus thrower
- Chalky Wright (1912–1957), American boxer
- Chantal Wright (born 1993), American judoka
- Charlie Wright (1938–2024), Scottish footballer and manager
- Chatt G. Wright (born 1941), American academic administrator
- Chauncey Wright (1830–1875), American philosopher and mathematician
- Chely Wright (born 1970), American singer
- Chuck Wright (born 1959), American bassist
- Cindy Wright (born 1972), Belgian-American painter
- C. Kelly Wright, American actress
- Clare Wright (born 1969), American-Australian historian
- Clarissa Dickson Wright (1947–2014), English chef
- Claud William Wright (1917–2010), British paleontologist
- Claudia Wright (1934–2005), Australian journalist
- Clay Wright, American kayaker
- Clive Wright (born 1965), Jamaican sprinter
- Clyde Wright (born 1941), American baseball player
- Clyde J. Wright (1878–??), American editor
- Clymer Wright (1932–2011), American activist
- Cobina Wright (1887–1970), American singer and actress
- Cobina Wright Jr. (1921–2011), American singer and actress
- Colin William Wright (1867–1952), Australian cattle breeder
- Collin Wright (born 2003), American football player
- Conroy Wright (born 1985), Caymanian cricketer
- Courtney Wright (born 1994), Northern Irish lawn bowler
- Cowley Wright (1889–1923), English actor
- Crispin Wright (born 1942), British philosopher
- C. S. Wright (1887–1975), Canadian explorer
- Curtis Wright (born 1955), American musician
- Cuthbert Wright (1892–1948), American poet
- Cy Wright (1893–1947), American baseball player

=== D ===
- Dae'Quan Wright (born 2003), American football player
- Damien Wright (born 1975), Australian cricketer
- Dana Wright (born 1959), Canadian hurdler
- Daniel W. Wright (1797–1844), justice of the Supreme Court of Mississippi
- Daphne Wright (born 1963), Irish visual artist
- Dare Wright (1914–2001), Canadian writer
- Darnell Wright (born 2001), American football player
- Darrell Wright (born 1979), American football player
- Dawn Wright (born 1961), American geographer
- Dean Wright (born 1962), American film director
- DeAndre Wright (born 1986), American football player
- Deborah Wright (born 1958), American corporate executive
- Deil S. Wright (1930–2009), American political scientist
- Delon Wright (born 1992), American basketball player
- Demetrius Wright (born 1991), American football player
- Denis Wright (1911–2005), British diplomat
- Denis Wright (composer) (1895–1967), English composer
- Dennis Wright (1919–1993), English footballer
- Dennis H. Wright (1931–2020), English professor
- Denny Wright (1924–1992), British guitarist
- Derek Wright (born 1998), American football player
- Derrick Wright (born 1928), British author
- Destry Wright (born 1977), American football player
- Dexter Russell Wright (1821–1886), American lawyer and politician
- Diana Kingsmill Wright (1908–1982), Canadian journalist
- Diaz Wright (born 1998), English footballer
- Dizzy Wright (born 1990), American rapper
- Dondre Wright (born 1994), Canadian football player
- Dorell Wright (born 1985), American basketball player
- Dorick M. Wright (1945–2020), Belizean prelate
- Dorsey Wright (born 1957), American actor
- Drew Wright (born 1979), Canadian singer
- Drey Wright (born 1995), English footballer
- Duncan Wright (1940–2023), Australian rules footballer
- Dunham Wright (1842–1942), American politician
- Dunky Wright (1896–1976), Scottish runner
- Dusty Wright (born 1957), American musician
- Dwayne Wright (born 1983), American football player
- Dwayne Wright (footballer) (born 1989), Caymanian footballer

=== E ===
- Earl Wright (1948–2013), American singer-songwriter
- Edgar Wright (born 1974), English film director
- Edna Wright (1945–2020), American singer
- Edythe Wright (1916–1965), American singer
- Elias Wright (1830–1901), American army officer
- Elissa Wright (born 1946), American politician
- Elizur Wright (1804–1885), American mathematician and abolitionist
- Ellen Riley Wright (1859–1904), English composer
- Elliott Wright (born 1980), British television personality
- Ellis Wright (1873–1940), English footballer
- Elmo Wright (born 1949), American football player
- E. M. Wright (1906–2005), British mathematician
- Emma Wright (born 1996), Canadian water polo player
- Emily Wright (born 1980), American songwriter
- Ephraim M. Wright, American politician
- Eric Lynn Wright (1964–1995), American rapper-songwriter
- Erica Abi Wright (born 1971), American singer
- Erik Olin Wright (1947–2019), American sociologist
- Ernie Wright (1939–2007), American football player
- Ernie Wright (footballer) (1912–1965), English footballer
- Ernest Hunter Wright (1882–1968), American professor
- Esmond Wright (1915–2003), English historian
- Esther Clark Wright (1895–1990), Canadian historian
- Evan Wright (born 1966), American writer

=== F ===
- Farnsworth Wright (1888–1940), American editor
- Fearon Wright (born 1978), Jamaican American football player
- Felix Wright (born 1959), American football player
- Felton T. Wright (1900–1971), American football coach
- Ferdinand von Wright (1822–1906), Finnish painter
- Fielding L. Wright (1895–1956), American politician
- Finbar Wright (born 1957), Irish singer-songwriter
- Fiona Wright (born 1983), Australian poet
- Flonzie Brown Wright (born 1942), American activist
- Florence May Wright, American poet
- Fortunatus Wright (1712–1757), British merchant
- Frank Lloyd Wright (1867–1959), American architect, designer, writer, and educator
- Frankie Wright (born 1985), American athlete
- Franz Wright (1953–2015), American poet
- Frazer Wright (born 1979), Scottish footballer
- Freda Wright (born 1953), South African politician

=== G ===
- Gabe Wright (born 1992), American football player
- Gabriella Wright (born 1982), English actress
- Gareth Wright (born 1981), Welsh golfer
- Garth Wright (born 1963), South African rugby union footballer
- Garland Wright (born 1954), American admiral
- Gavin Wright (born 1943), American economist and historian
- Gavin Wright (biochemist) (born 1973), English biochemist
- Gavin Wright (cricketer) (born 1973), English cricketer
- Gavyn Wright, British violinist
- Gayle Wright (born 1951), American politician
- Gearld Wright (1933–2002), American politician
- Ged Wright (born 1976), American visual artist
- Geoff Wright (1930–2011), English footballer
- Geoff Wright (cricketer) (1929–2003), New Zealand cricketer
- Geoffrey Wright (born 1959), Australian director
- George F. Wright (1881–1938), American politician & engineer
- Geraldine Wright, English neurotheologist
- G. Ernest Wright (1909–1974), American archaeologist
- Ghian Wright (born 1980), American music producer
- Gillian Wright (born 1960), British actress
- Gillian Wright (astronomer), Scottish astronomer
- Ginny Wright (1933–2021), American singer
- Gladys Stone Wright (1925–2025), American band leader
- Gladys Wright (1891–1980), English educator
- Glenn Wright (1901–1984), American baseball player
- Graham Wright (born 1968), Australian rules footballer
- Greg Wright (born 1979), English cricketer
- G. S. Wright (1845–1935), Australian banker
- Gunner Wright (born 1973), American actor
- Gustavus Blin Wright (1830–1898), Canadian entrepreneur
- G. V. Wright (born 1947), Irish politician
- Gwendolyn Wright (born 1946), American historian

=== H ===
- H. Wright (cricketer), New Zealand cricketer
- Haji Wright (born 1998), American soccer player
- Hamilton Wright (1867–1917), American physician
- Hannah Amelia Wright (1836–1924), American physician
- Hans Wright (1854–1925), Danish architect
- Hardy Wright (1893–1974), Scottish greyhound trainer
- Harriet G. R. Wright (1845–1928), American politician
- Harriet Wright O'Leary (1916–1999), American teacher and politician and first woman to serve on the tribal council of the Choctaw Nation of Oklahoma
- Harold Bell Wright (1872–1944), American author
- Harvey Wright, Scottish rugby union footballer
- H. E. Wright (1861–1897), English philatelist
- Heather Wright (born 1950), English actress
- Hector Wright (born 1969), Jamaican footballer
- Hedley Wright (born 1953), English cricketer
- Heidemarie Wright (born 1951), German politician
- Hendrick Bradley Wright (1808–1881), American politician
- Helena Rosa Wright (1887–1982), English doctor
- Henrietta Christian Wright (1852–1899), American author
- Herbert Wright (producer) (1946–2005), American science fiction author and television director and producer
- Hercules Wright (1881–1963), New Zealand rugby union footballer
- Herman Wright, American musician
- Hiram A. Wright (1823–1855), American politician
- H. Nelson Wright (1870–1941), Indian civil servant
- Holly Wright (born 1941), American photographer
- Hoover J. Wright (1928–2003), American football coach
- Horace Kenton Wright (1915–1976), Bahamian artist
- Horatio Wright (1820–1899), American general
- Horatio George Anthony Wright (1827–1901), Australian surgeon
- Hoss Wright, American drummer
- Howard Wright (basketball) (born 1967), American basketball player
- Howard E. Wright, American politician
- Howie Wright (born 1947), American baseball player
- Humberston Wright (1876–1953), British actor
- Huntley Wright (1868–1941), English actor
- H. W. Wright, English cricketer
- Hyman Wright, Jamaican record producer

=== I ===
- Ian Wright (born 1963), English Footballer
- Iain Wright (born 1972), British politician
- Ichabod Charles Wright (1795–1871), English scholar
- Imani Wright (born 1995), American basketball player
- Imogen Wright, South African software developer
- Irene Aloha Wright (1879–1972), American historian
- Irving Wright (1882–1953), American tennis player
- Isabella Wright (born 1997), American skier
- Isaiah Wright (born 1997), American football player
- Isom Wright (1859–1941), American politician
- Izzy Wright (born 1990), Australian basketball player

=== J ===
- J. Butler Wright (1877–1939), American diplomat
- J. Craig Wright (1929–2010), American judge
- Jacardia Wright (born 2000), American football player
- Jacky Wright, British technology executive
- Jacob L. Wright (born 1979), American author
- Jacqueline Wright, English film director
- Jaguar Wright (born 1977), American singer
- Jaime Wright (1927–1999), Brazilian pastor
- Jake Wright (born 1986), British football player
- Jamey Wright (born 1974), American baseball player
- Jamie Wright (born 1976), Canadian ice hockey player
- Jan Wright, New Zealand politician
- Janet Wright (1945–2016), Canadian actress
- Janet Meik Wright (born 1946), American legal scholar
- Janette Wright (born 1935), Scottish golfer
- Jared Wright, American editor and cartoonist
- Jaret Wright (born 1975), American baseball player
- Jarvis T. Wright (1830–1886), American businessman and politician
- Jason Wright (born 1982), American business consultant and former professional football player
- Javin Wright (born 2000), American football player
- Jay Wright (born 1961), American former college basketball coach
- Jay Wright (poet) (born 1934), American poet, playwright, and essayist
- Jaylen Wright (born 2003), American football player
- Jean Elizabeth Geiger Wright (1924–2002), American conservationist
- Jeffrey Wright (born 1965), American actor
- Jennifer Wright (born 1986), American author
- Jenny Wright (born 1962), American actress
- Jerauld Wright (1898–1995), American naval officer
- Jeremy Wright (born 1972), English politician
- Jeremiah Wright (born 1941), American pastor
- Jermaine Wright (born 1975), English footballer
- Jess Wright (born 1985), English television personality
- J. J. Wright, American disc jockey
- Joan Wright (1595–??), English witch
- Joby Wright (born 1950), American basketball coach
- Jocky Wright (1873–1946), Scottish footballer
- Jody Wright (born 1981), American football player and coach
- Joel Wright (born 1980), Canadian football player
- Joey Wright (born 1968), American basketball coach
- JoJo Wright, American radio personality
- José Roberto Wright (born 1944), Brazilian football referee
- Josephine Wright (born 1942), American musicologist
- Josh Wright (born 1989), English footballer
- Josh Wright (footballer, born 1988) (born 1988), English footballer
- Joyce Wright (1922–2020), British singer and actress
- J. Robert Wright (1936–2022), American priest
- J. Skelly Wright (1911–1988), American judge
- J. Stafford Wright (1905–1985), English theologian
- Jules Wright (theatre director) (1948–2015), Australian theatre director
- Jules Wright (politician) (1933–2022), American politician and businessman
- Julia McNair Wright (1840–1903), American writer
- Julia M. Wright (born 1964), Canadian academic
- Julie Wright, American softball coach
- June Wright (1919–2012), Australian writer
- Junior Anthony Wright (born 1986), American boxer
- Justin Wright (1981–2008), American artist
- Justin Wright (politician) (born 1984/1985), Canadian politician
- Justine Wright, New Zealand film editor

=== K ===
- Kai Wright, American journalist
- Kaleth O. Wright, American air force officer
- Kalie Wright (born 1993), American model
- Kat Wright, American singer-songwriter
- Katharine Wright (1874–1929), American teacher
- Katie Wright (born 1971), American actress
- Katrina Wright (born 1981), Australian lawn bowler
- Kelly Wright, American reporter
- Kelvin Wright (born 1952), New Zealand bishop
- Kendall Wright (born 1989), American football player
- Kenie Wright (born 1997), American soccer player
- Kenyatta Wright (born 1978), American football player
- Kieran Wright (footballer) (born 1999), Scottish footballer
- Kirby Wright, American writer
- Kit Wright (born 1944), English poet and author
- K. J. Wright (born 1989), American football player
- Kris Wright (born 1994), American racing driver
- Kristy Wright (born 1978), Australian actress
- Kurt Wright (born 1956), American politician

=== L ===
- Laurence Wright, American music composer
- Laurence Wright (physician) (1590–1657), English physician
- Lemuel Wellman Wright (1790–1886), American inventor
- Len Wright (1906–1967), American politician and businessman
- Lenoir C. Wright (1911–2003), American attorney
- Leo Wright (1933–1991), American jazz musician
- Leonard Wright (1555/1556–1591), English essayist
- Leroy Wright (1938–2020), American basketball player
- Lester Paul Wright (born 1946), British civil servant
- Letitia Wright (born 1993), Guyanese-British actress
- Levi Wright (1862–1953), English footballer and cricketer
- Liam Wright (born 1997), Australian rugby union footballer
- Lillian Mayfield Wright (1894–1986), American poet
- Lillian Meighen Wright (1910–1993), Canadian philanthropist
- Linda Wright (born 1950), British politician
- Lindsey Wright (born 1979), Australian golfer
- Liza Wright, American politician
- Lizz Wright (born 1980), American singer
- Lloyd Wright (1890–1978), American architect
- Logan Wright (1933–1999), American psychologist
- Lois Wright (1928–2023), American artist
- Lonnie Wright (1945–2019), American basketball player
- Loren Wright (1917–2005), American basketball player
- Lorenzen Wright (1975–2010), American basketball player
- Lorenzo Wright (1926–1972), American athlete
- Louisa Van Vleet Spicer Wright (1862–1913), American doctor
- Lowell Wright (born 2003), Canadian soccer player
- Loyd Wright (1892–1974), American attorney
- L. R. Wright (1939–2001), Canadian writer
- Lucilla Wright (born 1979), English field hockey player
- Lucky Wright (1880–1941), American baseball player
- Lucy Wright (1760–1821), American religious figure
- Luther Wright (born 1971), American basketball player
- L. W. Wright (1949–2024), American confidence trickster
- Lyle Wright (1898–1963), Canadian-American ice hockey player
- Lyndel Wright (born 1950), Jamaican cricketer
- Lynn Wright (1952–2022), American politician

=== M ===
- Mabel Osgood Wright (1859–1934), American author
- Magnus von Wright (1805–1868), Swedish painter
- Maia Wright (born 1997), Swedish singer-songwriter
- Major Wright (born 1988), American football player
- Malcolm Wright (1926–1996), Sri Lankan cricketer
- Mandy Wright (born 1977), American politician
- Manuel Wright (born 1984), American football player
- Marc Wright (1890–1975), American pole vaulter
- Marcellus E. Wright Sr. (1881–1962), American architect
- Margie Wright (born 1952), American softball coach
- Marion Thompson Wright (1902–1962), American activist
- Marquis Wright (born 1995), American basketball player
- Mars Wright (born 1995), American fashion designer
- Martine Wright (born 1972), American volleyball player
- Marva Wright (1948–2010), American singer
- Mary Wright (designer) (1904–1952), American designer, sculptor, author and businesswoman
- Mary Wright Gill (1867–1929), American scientific illustrator
- Mary Wright Plummer (1856–1916), Former president of the American Library Association
- Mary Wright Sewell (1797–1884), English poet and children's author
- Mat Wright (1858–1949), English cricketer
- Mathew Wright (born 1988), New Zealand rugby union footballer
- Matice Wright (born 1965), American naval officer
- Maureen Wright (born 1939), Australian athlete
- Mauricio Wright (born 1970), Costa Rican footballer
- Max Wright
  - Max Wright (1943–2019), American actor
  - Max Wright (Australian footballer) (1901–1988), Australian footballer
  - Max Wright (English footballer) (born 1998), English footballer
  - Max Wright (rugby union) (born 1997), English rugby union player
- McKinley Wright IV (born 1998), American basketball player
- Megan Wright (born 1981), Canadian runner
- Mel Wright (1928–1983), American baseball player
- Micah Wright (born 1974), American writer
- Michelle Wright (born 1961), Canadian singer
- Mickey Wright (1935–2020), American golfer
- Miriamm Wright (born 1971), American singer-songwriter
- Moira von Wright (born 1957), Finnish-Swedish academic
- Monty Wright (1931–2012), English footballer
- Monty Wright (boxer) (born 1969), British boxer
- Morton Wright (1914–1940), Australian rules footballer
- Moses Wright (born 1998), American basketball player
- Mother Wright (1921–2009), American activist
- Muriel H. Wright (1889–1975), American author and historian
- Murray Wright, New Zealand rugby league footballer
- Mykael Wright (born 2000), American football player
- Myles Wright (born 1996), English footballer
- Myron Benjamin Wright (1847–1894), American politician

=== N ===
- Nahshon Wright (born 1998), American football player
- Nancy Wright (1917–1994), Welsh golfer
- Nancy Young Wright, American politician
- Nanine Wright (1876–1974), American actress
- Nannie Kelly Wright (1856–1946), American ironmaster
- Nannie Louise Wright (1879–1958), American composer
- Narcissa Wright (born 1989), American speedrunner
- Nate Wright (born 1947), American football player
- Nathaniel Wright (1785–1858), American businessman and politician
- N'Bushe Wright (born 1969), American actress
- Neville Wright (born 1980), Canadian bobsledder
- Niall Wright (born 1991), Northern Irish actor
- Nicci Wright (born 1972), Canadian soccer player
- Niel Wright (1933–2024), New Zealand poet
- Norma Jean Wright (born 1956), American singer
- Norman Wright (1908–1974), English footballer
- Sir Norman Wright (1900–1970), British chemist
- N. T. Wright (born 1948), English theologian

=== O ===
- Olgivanna Lloyd Wright (1898–1985), Montenegrin-American dancer
- Oliver Wright (disambiguation), several people, including those known as Ollie Wright
- Olivia Wright (born 1990), Australian diver
- Orville Wright (1871–1948), American airplane inventor
- Oswald Wright (1877–1933), English cricketer
- Otis D. Wright II (born 1944), American judge
- O. V. Wright (1939–1980), American singer
- Ozzie Wright (born 1976), Australian surfer

=== P ===
- Pamela Wright (born 1964), Scottish golfer
- Pamela Rouse Wright (born 1957), American businesswoman, jewelry designer, and clubwoman
- Patience Wright (1725–1786), English-American sculptor
- Patrisha Wright (born 1949), American activist
- Pearce Wright (1933–2005), British journalist
- Peggy Wright, Canadian politician
- Percy Wright (1892–1980), American politician
- Philemon Wright (1760–1839), Canadian farmer
- Phoebe Wright (1710–1778), British embroiderer
- Prescott Wright (1935–2006), American film producer
- Priscilla Wright (singer) (born 1940), Canadian singer

=== Q ===
- Quincy Wright (1890–1970), American political scientist

=== R ===
- Randall Wright (born 1956), Canadian economist
- Randy Wright (born 1961), American football player
- Rashad Wright (born 1982), American basketball player
- Rasheim Wright (born 1981), American-Jordanian basketball player
- Ray Wright (1918–1987), English footballer
- Rebecca Wright (1947–2006), American ballet teacher
- Rebecca N. Wright (born 1967), American computer scientist
- Reg Wright (footballer) (1901–1973), English footballer
- Reg Wright (1905–1990), Australian politician
- Rejzohn Wright (born 2000), American football player
- Richard Wright (musician) (1943–2008), English musician
- R. L. Wright, American pastor
- Roderick Wright (bishop) (1940–2005), Scottish Roman Catholic bishop
- Roderick Wright (politician) (born 1952), American politician
- Rodney Wright (Australian footballer) (born 1960), Australian rules footballer
- Rodney Wright (born 1979), American football player
- Rodrique Wright (born 1984), American football player
- Rogers H. Wright (1927–2013), American psychologist
- Rosemarie Wright (1931–2020), English pianist
- Ross Wright (born 1952), Australian rules footballer
- Ross Wright (rugby union) (born 1986), New Zealand rugby union footballer
- Rowland Wright (1915–1991), British industrialist
- Royston Wright (1908–1977), English naval officer
- Ruben Wright, American musician
- Rufus Wright, English actor
- Ruggles Wright (1793–1863), Canadian lumber merchant
- Rumatiki Ruth Wright (1908–1982), New Zealand politician
- Russel Wright (1904–1976), American industrial designer
- Russell Francis Wright (1920–2012), Australian radio engineer
- Rusty Wright, American football coach

=== S ===
- Samson Wright (1899–1956), British physiologist
- Samuel E. Wright (1946–2021), American actor and singer
- Sara Wright (born 1969), Bermudian sailor
- Scooby Wright (born 1994), American football player
- Seaborn Wright, American politician
- Selwyn Wright (1934–2015), English physicist
- Sewall Wright (1889–1988), American biologist
- S. Fowler Wright (1874–1965), English writer
- Shane Wright (born 2004), Canadian ice hockey player
- Shannon Wright, American singer-songwriter
- Shannon Wright (illustrator) (born 1994), American cartoonist
- Shareece Wright (born 1987), American football player
- Shaun Wright (born 1968), British politician
- Sheena Wright (born 1970), American corporate executive
- Sheila Wright (1925–2013), British politician
- Shereka Wright (born 1981), American basketball player
- Silas Wright (1795–1847), American politician
- Smithson E. Wright (1807–1881), American politician
- Specs Wright (1927–1963), American drummer
- Susanna Wright (1697–1784), English poet
- Susannah Wright (1792–??), English publisher
- Susanne Wright, Austrian author
- Syd Wright (1882–1952), Australian rules footballer
- Sydney Edward Wright (1914–1966), Australian academic
- Sylvester Wright (born 1971), American football player
- Syreeta Wright (1946–2004), American singer-songwriter

=== T ===
- Taffy Wright (1911–1981), American baseball player
- Tandi Wright (born 1966), New Zealand actress
- Tanisha Wright (born 1983), American basketball coach
- Tanner Wright (born 1997), American Paralympic sprinter
- Tanya Wright (born 1971), American entrepreneur
- Ted Wright (1913–1983), American football player
- Tenny Wright (1885–1971), American film director
- Teresa Wright (1918–2005), American actress
- Timothy Wright (1947–2009), American singer and pastor
- T. J. Wright (born 1983), American football player
- T. M. Wright (1947–2015), American writer
- Toby Wright (record producer), American record producer
- Toby Wright (American football) (born 1970), American football player
- Toby Wright (priest) (born 1975), British Anglican priest
- Todd Wright, American sports broadcaster
- Toki Wright (born 1980), American rapper
- Tracy Wright (1959–2010), Canadian actress
- TrayVonn Wright (born 1991), American basketball player
- Tremaine Wright (born 1972), American politician
- Trevor Wright (born 1980), American actor
- Tricia Wright (born 1958), English darts player
- Turbutt Wright (1741–1783), American planter and politician
- Tyler Wright (born 1994), Canadian ice hockey player
- Tyler Wright (surfer) (born 1994), Australian surfer
- Tyreik Wright (born 2001), Irish footballer

=== V ===
- Van Earl Wright (born 1962), American sportscaster
- Verle Wright Jr. (1928–2012), American sports shooter
- Vern Wright (1900–1978), Australian rules footballer
- Verna Wright (1928–1998), British physician
- Vic Wright (1909–1964), English footballer
- Vicky Wright (born 1993), Scottish curler
- Victor Wright, Jamaican politician
- Victoria Wright (badminton player) (born 1976), French badminton player
- Vim Wright (1926–2003), Turkish-American entrepreneur
- Vince Wright (1931–2004), English footballer
- Virginia Wright (art collector) (1929–2020), American art collector

=== W ===
- Waller Rodwell Wright (1775–1826), English judge
- Warwick Wright (born 1946), New Zealand field hockey player
- Webster Wright (born 1967), American sports shooter
- Wendelin Wright, American materials scientist
- Wendy Wright, American activist
- Wesley Wright (born 1985), American baseball player
- Whitaker Wright (1846–1904), English businessman
- Whittni Wright (born 1987), American actress
- Wilbur Wright (1867–1912), American inventor
- Wilhelmina Wright (born 1964), American judge
- Wilhelm von Wright (1810–1887), Swedish-Finnish painter
- William Wright (surgeon) (1773–1860), British aural surgeon
- Wilmer Cave Wright (1868–1951), British-American philologist
- Winifred Grace Wright (1891–1978), English chemist
- Winky Wright (born 1971), American boxer
- Winston Wright (1943–1993), Jamaican keyboardist
- Winston Wright Jr. (born 2001), American football player

=== Y ===
- Ysabel Wright (1885–1960), Cuban-American botanist
- Yvonne Wright (1951–2016), American songwriter

=== Z ===
- Zach Wright (born 1995), American soccer player
- Zack Wright (born 1985), Bosnian-American basketball player
- Zain Wright (born 1979), Australian field hockey player
- Zara Wright, American author
- Zion Wright (born 1999), American skateboarder
- Zollie Wright (1909–1976), American baseball player

== Disambiguation pages ==
=== A ===
- Aaron Wright
- Adam Wright
- Al Wright
- Alan, Allan or Allen Wright
- Albert Wright
- Alex or Alexander Wright
- Alice Wright
- Alison Wright
- Amy Wright
- Andrew Wright
- Andy Wright
- Angus Wright
- Anne Wright
- Anthony, Antony or Tony Wright
- Antoine Wright
- A. R. Wright
- Archibald or Archie Wright
- Arthur Wright
- Ashley Wright
- Austin Wright

=== B ===
- Barbara Wright
- Belinda Wright
- Ben or Benjamin Wright
- Bert Wright
- Bill, Will or William Wright
- Billy Wright
- Bob, Bobby, Rob or Robert Wright
- Brad Wright
- Brian Wright
- Bruce Wright

=== C ===
- Cameron Wright
- Carl Wright
- Carol or Carroll Wright
- Carolyn Wright
- Catherine or Katherine Wright
- Charles, Charlie or Chuck Wright
- Chase Wright
- Chester Wright
- Chris or Christopher Wright
- Claire Wright
- Cliff or Clifford Wright
- Craig Wright
- Cyril Wright

=== D ===
- Dale Wright
- Dan or Daniel Wright
- Danny Wright
- Darren Wright
- Dave Wright
- David Wright
- Dick Wright
- Don or Donald Wright
- Donald Wright
- Doug Wright
- Douglas Wright

=== E ===
- Ed Wright
- Edmund Wright
- Edward Wright
- Edwin Wright
- Elizabeth Wright
- Eric Wright
- Ernest or Ernie Wright
- Ethel Wright
- Eugene Wright

=== F ===
- Frances Wright
- Francis Wright
- Frank Wright
- Fred or Frederick Wright

=== G ===
- Gary Wright
- George Wright
- Gerald Wright
- Gerry Wright
- Gilbert Wright
- Gordon Wright
- Gregory Wright

=== H ===
- Harold Wright
- Harry Wright
- Helen Wright
- Henry Wright
- Herbert Wright
- Hugh Wright

=== I ===
- Ian Wright
- Isaac Wright

=== J ===
- Jack Wright
- Jackie Wright
- James, Jim or Jimmy Wright
- Jane Wright
- Jason Wright
- Jeff or Jeffrey Wright
- Jerry Wright
- Jess or Jessica Wright
- J. J. Wright
- Joe Wright
- John, Johnny or Johnnie Wright
- Jon Wright
- Jonathan Wright
- Jordan Wright
- Joseph Wright
- Joshua Wright
- Judith or Judy Wright
- Julian Wright

=== K ===
- Katherine or Catherine Wright
- Keith Wright
- Ken, Kenneth or Kenny Wright
- Kevin Wright
- Kyle Wright

=== L ===
- Lammar Wright
- Larry Wright
- Lawrence Wright
- Laura Wright
- Lee Wright
- Leslie Wright
- Louis Wright
- Louise Wright
- Luke Wright

=== M ===
- Mac or Mack Wright
- Marcus Wright
- Margaret or Peggy Wright
- Marie Wright
- Mark Wright
- Marshall Wright
- Martha Wright
- Martin Wright
- Mary Wright
- Mary Ann Wright
- Matt or Matthew Wright
- Max Wright
- Michael, Mick, Mickey or Mike Wright
- Milton Wright
- Molly Wright

=== N ===
- Nathan Wright
- Nicholas or Nick Wright
- Nigel Wright

=== O ===
- Ollie or Oliver Wright
- Owen Wright

=== P ===
- Patricia Wright
- Pat or Patrick Wright
- Paul Wright
- Peggy or Margaret Wright
- Pete or Peter Wright
- Philip or Phillip Wright

=== R ===
- Ralph Wright
- Rasty Wright
- Raymond Wright
- Richard or Rick Wright
- Ricky Wright
- Rita Wright
- Rob, Bobby, Bob or Robert Wright
- Robin Wright
- Rod or Roderick Wright
- Roger Wright
- Ronald Wright
- Roy Wright
- Ruby Wright
- Ryan Wright

=== S ===
- Sam or Samuel Wright
- Sarah Wright
- Scott Wright
- Simon Wright
- Sophie Wright
- Stan Wright
- Stephen Wright
- Steven Wright
- Stuart Wright
- Sue or Susan Wright

=== T ===
- Terrance or Terry Wright
- Ted or Theodore Wright
- Thomas Wright
- Tim Wright
- Tom Wright
- Tommy Wright
- Tony, Anthony or Antony Wright

=== W ===
- Wallace Wright
- Walter Wright
- Warren Wright
- Wayne Wright
- Will, William or Bill Wright Wright
- Willie or Willy Wright

== Fictional characters ==
- Evan Wright, central character in Hotline Miami 2: Wrong Number
- Honey Wright, a character on the British drama series Casualty
- May Wright, a character on the British soap opera EastEnders
- Phoenix Wright, a character in the video game series Ace Attorney
- Nate Wright, the main character of the comic strip Big Nate
- Micromax (Scott Wright), a mutant superhero in Marvel Comics books
- Timothy Wright (AKA Masky), a character from the YouTube series “Marble Hornets”

== See also ==
- Cartwright (disambiguation), a disambiguation page for "Cartwright"
- Wainwright (disambiguation), a disambiguation page for "Wainwright"
- Wheelwright (disambiguation), a disambiguation page for "Wheelright"
- Wright (disambiguation), a disambiguation page for "Wright"
- Admiral Wright (disambiguation), a disambiguation page for Admirals surnamed "Wright"
- Attorney General Wright (disambiguation), a disambiguation page for Attorney Generals surnamed "Wright"
- General Wright (disambiguation), a disambiguation page for Generals surnamed "Wright"
- Governor Wright (disambiguation), a disambiguation page for Governors surnamed "Wright"
- Judge Wright (disambiguation), a disambiguation page for Judges surnamed "Wright"
- Justice Wright (disambiguation), a disambiguation page for Justices surnamed "Wright"
- Lord Wright (disambiguation), a disambiguation page for Lords whose title includes "Wright"
- Senator Wright (disambiguation), a disambiguation page for Senators surnamed "Wright"
- Wright Elemakule Bowman Sr. (1907–2003), American and Hawaiian woodworker, traditional canoe builder, and educator
