= Ernest Wright =

Ernest or Ernie Wright may refer to:

- Ernest Vincent Wright (1872–1939), American author
- Ernest M. Wright (born 1940), Irish-American biologist
- Ernest Hunter Wright (1882–1968), professor of English at Columbia University
- G. Ernest Wright (1909–1974), Old Testament scholar and biblical archaeologist
- Ernest Wright (English cricketer) (1894–1977), English cricketer
- Ernest Wright (New Zealand cricketer) (1867–1940), New Zealand cricketer
- Ernest Wright (scissors maker) Manufacturer of handmade scissors, established 1902 in Sheffield, England.
- Ernest Gerard Wright (1901–1981), Australian politician
- Vic Wright (Ernest Victor Wright, 1909–1964), footballer who played for Liverpool and Rotherham United in the 1930s
- Ernest Wright (footballer) (1908–1977), English footballer for Mansfield Town
- Ernie Wright (footballer) (1912–?), English football inside forward of the 1930s, who played for Crewe and Oldham Athletic
- Ernie Wright (1939–2007), American football player
- Charles Ernest Wright, Canadian politician from Ontario
