= Arthur Wright =

Arthur Wright may refer to:

- Arthur Wright (footballer) (1919–1985), English footballer who played for Sunderland
- Arthur Wright (police officer) (1861–1938), New Zealand policeman and police commissioner
- Arthur Wright (writer) (1870–1932), Australian novelist
- Arthur Wright (Royal Navy officer) (1886–1970), English cricketer and Royal Navy officer
- Arthur Wright (speedway rider) (1933–2016), English speedway rider
- Arthur E. Wright (1907–1977), Canadian politician
- Arthur F. Wright (1913–1976), American academic, sinologist, editor and professor of history
- Arthur G. Wright (1937–2015), American R&B guitarist and arranger
- Arthur Williams Wright (1836–1915), American physicist
- Arthur Cory-Wright (1869–1951), British businessman
- A. Gilbert Wright (1909–1987), American zoologist and museologist
- A. R. Wright (folklorist) (1862–1932), British folklorist

== See also ==
- Wright (surname)
