= Max Wright (disambiguation) =

Max Wright (1943–2019) was an American actor.

Max Wright may also refer to:

- Max Wright (Australian footballer) (1901–1988), Australian footballer
- Max Wright (English footballer) (born 1998), English footballer
- Max Wright (rugby union) (born 1997), English rugby union player

== See also ==
- Mac Wright
