= Jeffrey Wright (disambiguation) =

Jeffrey Wright (born 1965) is an American actor.

Jeff or Jeffrey Wright may also refer to:

- Jeff Wright (defensive back) (born 1949), American football player for Minnesota
- Jeff Wright (defensive tackle) (born 1963), American football player for Buffalo
- Jeff Wright (footballer) (born 1952), English football midfielder who played for Wigan Athletic
- Jeff Wright (murder victim) (died 2003)
- Jeffrey Cyphers Wright (born 1951), poet
- Jeff Wright, former stage name of Geoffrey K. Pullum (born 1945), British keyboard player and linguist

== See also ==
- Geoffrey Wright (born 1959), Australian film director
- Geoff Wright (1930–2011), English footballer
- Wright (surname)
