= Carolyn Wright (disambiguation) =

Carolyn Wright (born 1946) is an Australian high jumper.

Carolyn Wright may also refer to:

- Carolyn Wright (Chief Justice) (born 1946), Chief Justice of the Fifth Court of Appeals of Texas
- Carolyn D. Wright (1949–2016), American poet

== See also ==
- Carol Wright (disambiguation)
- Carolyne Wright (born 1949), American poet
