= J. J. Wright =

J. J. Wright may refer to:

- J.J. Wright (composer), American sacred jazz composer and conductor
- J. J. Wright (DJ), American disc jockey from Boston
