= General Wright =

General Wright may refer to:

- Ambrose R. Wright (1826–1872), Confederate general in the American Civil War
- Archibald Wright (British Army officer) (1851–1943), British Army brigadier general
- Bruce A. Wright (born c. 1951), U.S. Air Force lieutenant general
- Edwin Kennedy Wright (1898–1983), U.S. Army major general
- George Wright (general) (1803–1865), Union Army general in the American Civil War
- Horatio Wright (1820–1899), Union Army general in the American Civil War
- John M. Wright (1916–2014)m U.S. Army Force lieutenant general
- Marcus Joseph Wright (1831–1922), Confederate general in the American Civil War
- Raymond R. Wright (USMC) (1892–1964), U.S. Marine Corps major general
- Roland R. Wright (1919–2015), U.S. Air Force brigadier general
- Stuart P. Wright (1903-1982), U.S. Army Air Force major general
- Thomas Charles Wright (1799–1868), Ecuadorian Army general
- Wallace Duffield Wright (1875–1953), British Army brigadier general
- William M. Wright (1863–1943), United States Army general in World War I
- William Purvis Wright (1846–1910), Royal Marines general
- Michael Wright, Canadian Army general
- General Wright, a character in The Legend of Zelda: Echoes of Wisdom
