= Walter Wright =

Walter Wright may refer to:

- Walter Wright (academic), English Tudor academic administrator
- Walter Wright (artist) (1866–1933), English-born New Zealand artist
- Walter Wright (boxer) (born 1981), American professional boxer
- Walter Wright (cricketer) (1856–1940), English cricketer
- Walter Wright (oral historian) (died 1949), Canadian Tsimshian hereditary chief
- Walter Wright (wrestler) (1901–1982), American wrestler
- Walter C. Wright, American seminary president
- Walter Julian Wright (1908–1972), known as Bricktop Wright, American baseball player
- Walter Livingston Wright (1872–1946), American educator and president of Lincoln University, Pennsylvania
- Walter Percival Wright (1909–1992), Canadian politician in the Legislative Assembly of British Columbia
