= A. R. Wright =

A. R. Wright may refer to:

- Augustus Romaldus Wright (1813–1891), American politician, lawyer and Confederate colonel
- A. R. Wright (folklorist) (1862–1932), British folklorist, anthropologist and civil servant
