= Rod Wright =

Rod or Roderick Wright may refer to:

- Roderick Wright (bishop) (1940–2005), Scottish bishop
- Roderick Wright (politician) (born 1952), American politician
- Rod Wright (rugby league), Australian rugby league footballer

== See also ==
- Rodney Wright (born 1979), American football player
- Rodney Wright (Australian footballer) (born 1960), Australian rules footballer
