= Barbara Wright =

Barbara Wright may refer to:

- Barbara Wright (translator) (1915–2009), English translator of modern French literature
- Barbara Wright (politician) (born 1933), American politician in New Jersey
- Barbara Wright (professor) (1935–2019), emeritus professor of French at Trinity College, Dublin
- Barbara Wright (author) (born 1951), American novelist
- Barbara Wright (Doctor Who), a fictional character in the British science fiction television series Doctor Who
