= Cameron Wright =

Cameron Wright may refer to:

- Cameron Wright (weapons scientist) (1901–1979), Welsh weapons scientist during World War II
- Cameron Wright (athlete) (born 1972), retired American high jumper
- Cameron Wright (rugby union) (born 1994), South African rugby union player
- Cameron Wright (footballer) (born 1968), Australian rules footballer
