= Joshua Wright =

Josh or Joshua Wright may refer to:

- Joshua D. Wright (born 1977), legal academic and former Commissioner of the U.S. Federal Trade Commission
- Joshua Wright (Alaska politician) (1929–2017), member of the state House of Representatives
- Joshua Wright (mayor), mayor of Trenton, New Jersey from 1803 to 1806
- J. Butler Wright (1877–1939), American diplomat
- Josh Wright (born 1989), English ex-footballer, played for teams including Gillingham
- Josh Wright (footballer, born 1988), English ex-footballer, played for teams including Emley
