= Miami Valley College =

Coordinates: 39°33′10″N 84°13′15″W

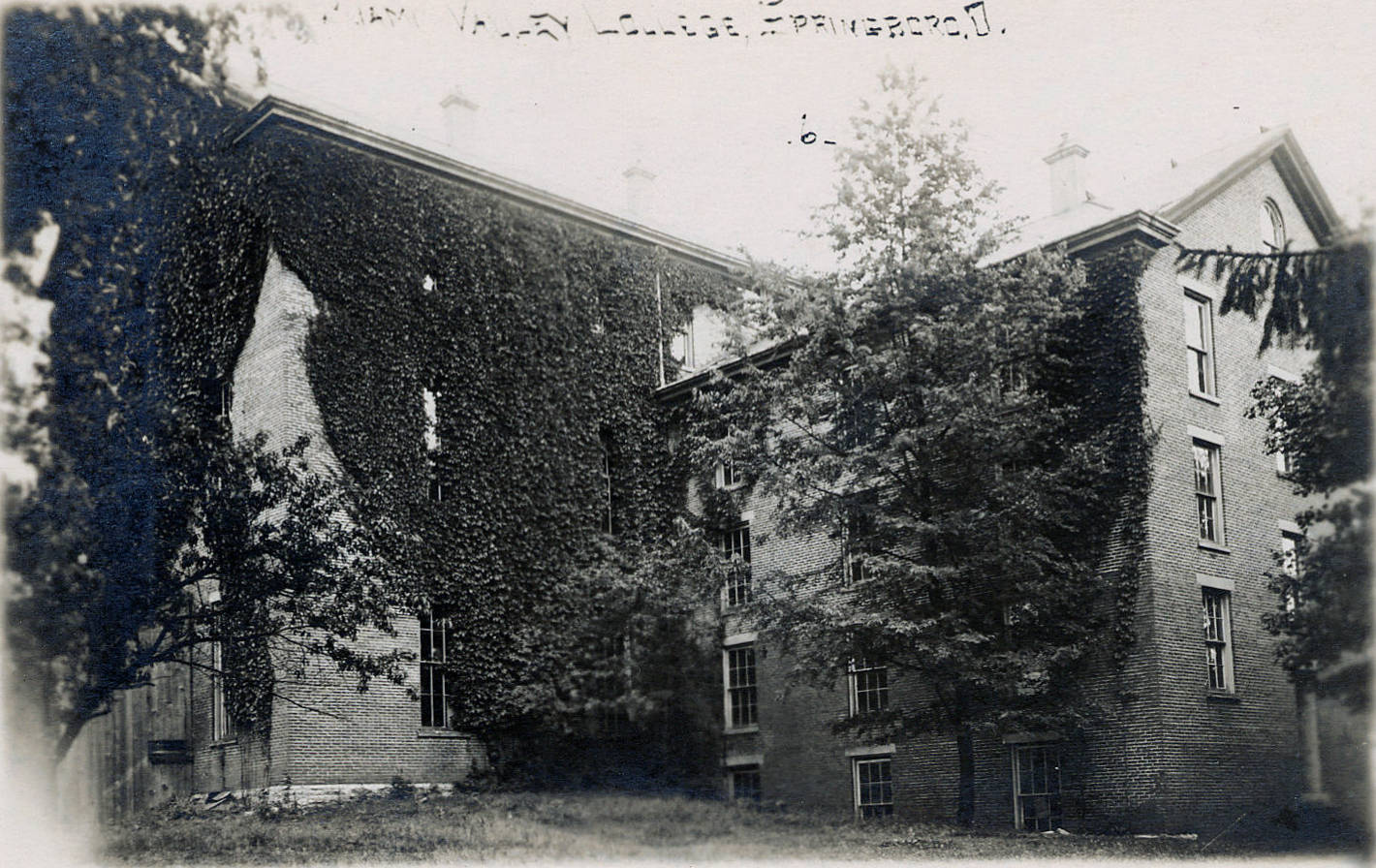
Miami Valley College

Miami Valley College, initially called Miami Valley Institute, was a college in Springboro, Ohio, United States. It was founded in 1870 by Aron Wright and other Quakers; Wright served as its president until 1879. The college closed in 1883.
