= Jason Wright (disambiguation) =

Jason Wright may refer to:

- Jason Wright (born 1982), American business consultant and former football player
- Jason Wright (astronomer), American astronomer
- Jason Wright (Jamaican footballer) (born 1994), Jamaican football player
- Jason Wright (rugby union) (born 1994), New Zealand rugby union player
- Jason Wright Wingate (born 1971), American composer, cellist and poet
- Jason D. Wright (born 1976), American lawyer
- Jason F. Wright (born 1971), American author

Jenson Wright (born 2014) English Author
