= Aaron Wright =

Aaron Wright may refer to:

- Aaron Wright (cricketer) (born 1997), Irish cricketer
- Aaron Abel Wright (1840–1922), Canadian politician

== See also ==
- Aron Wright (1810–1885), American physician and educator
