= Senator Wright =

Senator Wright may refer to:

== Members of the United States Senate ==
- George G. Wright (1820–1896), U.S. Senator from Iowa from 1871 to 1877
- Joseph A. Wright (1810–1867), U.S. Senator from Indiana from 1862 to 1863
- Robert Wright (Maryland politician) (1752–1826), U.S. Senator from Maryland from 1801 to 1806
- Silas Wright (1795–1847), U.S. Senator from New York from 1833 to 1844
- William Wright (United States politician) (1794–1866), U.S. Senator from New Jersey from 1853 to 1859, and from 1863 to 1866

== United States state senate members ==
- Ambrose R. Wright (1826–1872), Georgia State Senate
- Benjamin D. Wright (1799–1874), Florida State Senate
- Cathie Wright (1929–2012), California State Senate
- Dan S. Wright (1802–1867), New York State Senate
- Dexter Russell Wright (1821–1886), Connecticut State Senate
- Donald O. Wright (1892–1985), Minnesota State Senate
- Fielding L. Wright (1895–1956), Mississippi State Senate
- Gerald Wright (politician) (born 1942), Oklahoma State Senate
- Hiram A. Wright (1823–1855), Wisconsin State Senate
- James A. Wright (Wisconsin politician) (1873–1911), Wisconsin State Senate
- James W. Wright (fl. 1990s–2000s), New York State Senate
- Joe Wright (Kentucky politician) (fl. 1970s–1990s), Kentucky State Senate
- John C. Wright (New York politician) (1801–1862), New York State Senate
- Nathaniel Wright (1785–1858), Massachusetts State Senate
- Robin Wright-Jones (born 1950), Missouri State Senate
- Roderick Wright (politician) (born 1952), California State Senate
- Roy V. Wright (1876–1948), New Jersey State Senate
- Tom Wright (politician) (born 1952), Florida State Senate
