= Further Triennial =

The Further Triennial is a forthcoming contemporary art triennial focusing on Northern California artists. The Further Triennial is scheduled for the spring of 2027.

== History ==
Philanthropist Robin M. Wright founded and announced The Further Triennial in 2024. The Further Triennial's inaugural director is curator and historian Zully Adler.

The Further Triennial's name is a homage to the school bus named Further that San Francisco author Ken Kesey drove across the country with his "Merry Band of Pranksters".

== Venues ==
The Further Triennial will be spread amongst numerous institutions including: SFMOMA, the Fine Arts Museums of San Francisco, the Institute of Contemporary Art San Francisco, Marin MOCA, the San Jose Museum of Art, the Oakland Museum of California, and the Berkeley Art Museum and Pacific Film Archive; in addition to smaller organizations.
