= Tim Wright =

Tim Wright may refer to:

- Tim Wright (American football) (born 1990), American football tight end
- Tim Wright (bassist) (1952–2013), American bassist from Pere Ubu and DNA
- Tim Wright (engineer) (born 1949), Formula One engineer
- Tim Wright (motorsport), a different person, also a Formula One engineer
- Tim Wright (English musician), English musician and recording artist
- Tim Wright (rower) (born 1973), Australian lightweight rower
- Tim Wright (Welsh musician) (born 1967), also known as CoLD SToRAGE, Welsh video game composer
- Tim Wright, early guitarist of rock band Primus
- Tim Wright (curler), American curler

== See also ==
- Timothy Wright, American gospel singer
