= Robin Wright (disambiguation) =

Robin Wright (born 1966) is an American film actress

Robin Wright may also refer to:

- Robin Wright (author) (born 1948), American journalist, author and foreign affairs analyst
- Robin Wright (rugby union) (1885–1958), Irish rugby international
- Robin K. Wright, American art historian
- Robin M. Wright, American philanthropist

== See also ==
- Robin Wright-Jones (born 1950), American politician
