= Gilbert Wright =

Gilbert Wright may refer to:

- Gilbert Wright (priest), Welsh Anglican priest
- Gilbert Scott Wright (1880–1958), English painter
- A. Gilbert Wright (1909–1987), American zoologist
