= Steve Wright (footballer, born 1893) =

English footballer and manager

Personal information
- Full name: Stephen Wright
- Date of birth: 1893
- Place of birth: Leicester, England
- Date of death: 15 October 1959 (aged 66)
- Place of death: Leicester, England
- Height: 5 ft 7 in (1.70 m)
- Position: Half back

Senior career*
Years	Team	Apps	(Gls)
19??–1915	Belvoir Street Sunday School		
1919–1920	Bohemians	20	(0)
1920–1922	Bolton Wanderers	10	(0)
1922–1923	Norwich City	36	(1)
1923–1924	Brighton & Hove Albion	4	(0)

Managerial career
- 1930–1934: Dundalk
- * Club domestic league appearances and goals

Stephen Wright (1893 – 15 October 1959) was an English professional footballer who played as a half back in the Football League for Bolton Wanderers, Norwich City and Brighton & Hove Albion. He also played in Ireland for Bohemians, and managed Dundalk to the 1932–33 League of Ireland title.

== Life and career ==
Wright was born in Leicester in 1893. He played representative football for Leicester Schools, alongside future Bolton team-mate and Scotland international Alex Donaldson. He went on to play for Leicester-based club Belvoir Street Sunday School, where he succeeded future England international Tommy Clay as team captain after Clay signed for Leicester Fosse. During the First World War, Wright served with the Leicestershire Regiment and the Royal Army Medical Corps. For a time he was stationed in Ireland, where he played for Dublin club Bohemians and was picked to play in an amateur international against England, the selectors believing him to be an Irishman; he did not accept the invitation.

After the war, amid interest from "several first-class clubs", Wright signed for Bolton Wanderers of the Football League First Division. He spent something over two seasons with the club, as backup for Jimmy Seddon, and played 10 first-team matches, all in the league, before moving on to Norwich City of the Third Division South in July 1922 for a £750 fee. Until then he had played as a centre half, "[making] up for his lack of height by his cleverness" – he stood 5 ft 7 in (1.70 m) – but he was a regular for Norwich on the left of the half-back line. Wright saw his future in management, but after failing to get the player-manager vacancy at Chatham Town, he attempted to continue his playing career with another Third Division club, Brighton & Hove Albion, in 1923–24. He made just four appearances before a broken leg forced his retirement at the end of the season.

Wright returned to Ireland in 1930 as trainer-coach – effectively, manager – of Dundalk. He was later to describe the role as "doing everything except selling the programmes". He led the club to runners-up spots in both league and Cup in his first season, and his team then won the President's Cup by a wide margin. In his third season, Dundalk became the first team based outside the capital to win the league title.

After four years with Dundalk, Wright went back to England to take up the post of trainer to Lincoln City Lincoln finished in the top four of the Third Division North three times in the four seasons that Wright trained them, and according to the Lincolnshire Echo, he "proved a popular and efficient trainer, and tributes to the fit condition of the players have been paid on many of the grounds on which City have appeared." He joined Ipswich Town, newly elected to the Football League, as trainer in July 1938, but left them again soon afterwards.

The following year, Wright was recommended by Stanley Rous, secretary of the Football Association, to their Norwegian counterparts for a three-month appointment as trainer-coach of SK Strong's football department and technical adviser to other teams in Oslo and elsewhere.

Wright's son, Geoff, played league football for Walsall in the 1950s.

Wright died in his native Leicester in 1959 at the age of 66.
