= Jane Wright =

Jane Wright may refer to:

- E. Jane Wright a.k.a. Denise Moore (1876–1911), French aviator
- Jane C. Wright (1919–2013), American oncologist
- Jane Wright (entomologist) (born 1954), Canadian entomologist
- Jane Wright (swimmer) (born 1955), Canadian swimmer
