= Roger Wright =

Roger Wright may refer to:

- Roger Wright (music administrator) (born 1956), British music administrator
- Roger Wright (pianist) (born 1974), American pianist
- Roger Wright (speedway rider) (born 1945), New Zealand motorcycle racer

== See also ==
- Rogers H. Wright (1927–2013), American psychologist
