= Bruce Wright =

Bruce Wright may refer to:

- Bruce A. Wright (born c. 1951), United States Air Force general
- Bruce M. Wright (1917–2005), American jurist
