= T. E. Lones =

British folklorist (1860–1944)

Thomas East Lones (1860–1944) was a British folklorist, noted for his research into British calendar customs.

== Early life and education ==
Lones was born in Tipton, Staffordshire, on 25 September 1860.

He was privately educated before attending Trinity College Dublin, where he graduated with a Diploma in the Faculty of Engineering.

== Career ==
In 1884 he began work as a member of the technical staff at the newly established Patent Office, at which he remained for his entire working life, retiring in 1924.

Lones published a number of works on the history of industry and technology, particularly on mining and metallurgy. These included a number of articles on these topics, such as the history of mining in the Black Country and the development of the Newcomen steam engine. He also published a book on Aristotle's researches in natural science and one on zinc and its alloys.

== Folklore ==
Lones joined the Folklore Society in 1909 and became a regular contributor to its journal.

Lones is most notable for his editing for publication, a collection of material made over many years by fellow folklorist (and Patent Office employee) A. R. Wright, on the calendar customs of Britain. On Wright's death, Lones edited and saw into print three volumes on the topic, published between 1936 and 1940.

The three volumes were published as:

- Wright, A. R. (ed. Lones, T. E. with a preface by Hooke, S. H.). (1936) British Calendar Customs: England. v. 1. Movable Festivals (London: published for the Folk-Lore Society, W. Glaisher)
- Wright, A. R. (ed. Lones, T. E. with a preface by Hooke, S. H.). (1938) British Calendar Customs: England. v. 2. Fixed Festivals, January–May, inclusive. (London: published for the Folk-Lore Society, W. Glaisher)
- Wright, A. R. (ed. Lones, T. E. with a preface by Hooke, S. H.). (1940) British Calendar Customs: England. v. 3. Fixed Festivals, June–December, inclusive. (London: published for the Folk-Lore Society, W. Glaisher)

The first volume was described as an "interesting and entertaining volume" when reviewed in The Times. All three volumes became standard texts for research into British folklore and are still frequently cited in works on British folk traditions. They have been described as "about the only one" of the large-scale collecting projects envisioned at the Folklore Society's creation in the late nineteenth century, to have "actually got completed".

Lones's obituary in the Folklore Society's journal notes that he also collected material for a volume on Worcestershire for the Society's County Folklore series. Thought Lones contributed to the Folklore Society's Journal on Worcestershire Folklore, a volume in this series on the topic was never published.

== Recognition ==
In 1941, in recognition of his work in the field of calendar customs, Lones was awarded the Folklore Society's Coote Lake Medal for Research, becoming one of the first recipients of the medal.

== Selected works ==
- Lones, Thomas East (1898). A History of Mining in the Black Country. Dudley. OCLC 56379803.
- Lones, T. E. (1914). "Worcestershire Folklore". Folklore. 25 (3): 370–370. doi:10.1080/0015587X.1914.9718834. ISSN 0015-587X.
- Lones, T. E. (1914). "An Omen from Dress". Folklore. 25 (3): 372–373. doi:10.1080/0015587X.1914.9718840. ISSN 0015-587X.
- Lones, T. E. (1925). "Scraps of English Folklore, X." Folklore. 36 (1): 82–93. doi:10.1080/0015587X.1925.9718312. ISSN 0015-587X.
- Lones, T. E. (1930). "The South Staffordshire and North Worcester-shire Mining District and its Relics of Mining Appliances". Transactions of the Newcomen Society. 11 (1): 42–54. doi:10.1179/tns.1930.004. ISSN 0372–0187.
- Lones, T. E. (1932). "The Site of Newcomen's Engine of 1712". Transactions of the Newcomen Society. 13 (1): 1–13. doi:10.1179/tns.1932.001. ISSN 0372–0187.
- Wright, A. R (ed. Lones, T. E. with a preface by Hooke, S.H.). (1936) British calendar customs: England. v. 1. Movable festivals (London : Published for the Folk-Lore Society, W. Glaisher)
- Wright, A. R (ed. Lones, T. E. with a preface by Hooke, S.H.). (1938) British calendar customs: England.v. 2. Fixed festivals, January–May, inclusive. (London : Published for the Folk-Lore Society, W. Glaisher)
- Lones, T. E. (1939). "A Précis of Mettallum Martis and an Analysis of Dud Dudley's Alleged Invention". Transactions of the Newcomen Society. 20 (1): 17–28. doi:10.1179/tns.1939.002. ISSN 0372–0187.
- Wright, A. R (ed. Lones, T. E. with a preface by Hooke, S.H.). (1940) British calendar customs: England.v. 3. Fixed festivals, June–December, inclusive. (London : Published for the Folk-Lore Society, W. Glaisher)
