= Kenneth Wright =

Ken, Kenneth or Kenny Wright may refer to:

- Kenneth Anthony Wright (1899–1975), English composer, conductor and TV musical director
- Kenneth W. Wright (born 1945), American Church of Christ minister
- Kenneth Wright, pen name of Lester del Rey (1915–1993), American science fiction author
- Kenny Wright (born 1977), American football player
- Kenny Wright (footballer) (born 1985), Scottish footballer
- Ken Wright (auto racing mechanic) (born 1940), American race car driver and mechanic
- Ken Wright (baseball) (1946–2017), American baseball pitcher
- Ken Wright (footballer) (1922–1994), English footballer who played as a forward
- Ken Wright (politician) (1925–2019), Australian politician
- Ken Wright (rugby) (born 1956), Australian rugby union and rugby league player
