= Philip Wright =

Philip or Phillip Wright may refer to:

- Philip Green Wright (1861–1934), American economist
- Phillip Wright (1889–1970), Australian pastoralist and philanthropist
- Philip Quincy Wright (1890–1970), American political scientist
- Philip Wright (actor), English actor
- Philip Wright (cricketer) (1903–1968), English cricketer
- Philip Adrian Wright (born 1956), English musician
- Philip S. Wright (born 1967), Belizean divine; bishop of Belize's Anglican Diocese
- Philip Wright (field hockey) (born 1986) (Canada at the 2008 Summer Olympics)

== See also ==
- Wright (surname)
