= Julian Wright (disambiguation) =

Julian Wright (born 1987) is an American basketball player.

Julian Wright may also refer to:

- Julian Wright (economist) (born 1969), New Zealand economist
- Julian Wright (historian) (born 1974), British historian
- Julian M. Wright (1884–1938), American attorney and judge
