= Clifford Wright =

Clifford or Cliff Wright may refer to:

Clifford

- Clifford Wright (bishop) (1922–2014), Anglican bishop of Monmouth
- Clifford Wright (politician) (1927–2014), mayor of Saskatoon, Canada

Cliff

- Cliff Wright (illustrator) (born 1963), British artist and illustrator
- Cliff Wright (fighter) (born 1979), American mixed martial artist
- Cliff Wright (footballer) (1944–2022), English footballer
