= Ruby Wright =

Ruby Wright may refer to:

- Ruby Wright (big band-era singer) (Ruby Rapp, 1914–2004), wife of Barney Rapp
- Ruby Wright (country singer) (Ruby Wells, 1939–2009), daughter of Johnnie Wright and Kitty Wells
