= Cameron Wright (weapons scientist) =

Welsh scientist

Horace Cameron Wright (c. 1901 – 1979), known as "Cam", was a Welsh scientist who worked for the Royal Naval Physiological Laboratory at Alverstoke, near Gosport in Hampshire and for the British Ministry of Aircraft Production during World War II.

== Early life ==
Nothing about his parents are known, but he was raised by Welsh mural artist Frank Brangwyn. In his early days he was nicknamed the "Camiknickers".

== Works ==
He conducted experiments on the effects of x rays on the human body, new bombs designed to blow up dams, underwater explosions, and underwater escapes from submerged aircraft and submarines, among other things. Most of the more dangerous experiments he performed on himself. He once spent weeks in hospital after being blown out of the water by a massive self-inflicted explosion, and surfaced from an artificial depth of 90 metres on a single breath of air. All of his research reports remain classified, however.

== Status ==
All 25 of his research reports are currently lost.
