= Florence May Wright =

American poet

- Born: Canada
- Died: 1908
- Occupation: poet
- Spouse: Albert J. Henderson (m. 1905)
- Children: yes

Florence May Wright Henderson (died 1908) was an American poet active in Salem, Oregon in the early 20th century.

== Biography ==
She was originally from Canada. It was reported that she never attended school or college, but learned to read and write from her mother and from private instructors. She was heralded in various local publications as a rising star rivaling the region's greatest literary figures; her poetry was published in many local and regional newspapers and magazines. She married Albert J. Henderson in 1905. They had children; she died in 1908.
