= Ernest Wright (New Zealand cricketer) =

New Zealand cricketer

Personal information
- Full name: Ernest Llewellyn Wright
- Born: 10 November 1867; Panmure, Auckland, New Zealand
- Died: 10 August 1940 (aged 72); Paddington, Sydney, Australia
- Batting: Left-handed
- Role: Wicket-keeper

Domestic team information
- Years: Team
- 1894/95–1897/98: Auckland
- 1898/99: Wellington
- 1899/900: Canterbury
- 1900/01: Wellington

Career statistics
Competition	First-class
Matches	13
Runs scored	200
Batting average	13.33
100s/50s	0/1
Top score	89
Balls bowled	12
Wickets	0
Bowling average	–
5 wickets in innings	–
10 wickets in match	–
Best bowling	–
Catches/stumpings	19/10
- Source: ESPNcricinfo, 27 May 2023

Ernest Llewellyn Wright (10 November 1867 – 10 August 1940) was a New Zealand cricketer. He played first-class cricket for Auckland, Canterbury and Wellington between 1894 and 1901. He represented New Zealand as a wicket-keeper in one match in December 1896.
