= Archibald Wright =

Archibald Wright may refer to:

- Archibald Wright (British Army officer) (fl. 1870s–1900s)
- Archibald Wright (judge) (1809–1884), Justice of the Tennessee Supreme Court
- Archie Wright (1924–1990), Scottish footballer
