= Rasty Wright =

Rasty Wright may refer to:

- Rasty Wright (outfielder) (1863–1922), American professional baseball outfielder
- Rasty Wright (pitcher) (1895–1948), American professional baseball pitcher
