= Gregory Wright =

Gregory Wright may refer to:

- Gregory Wright (astrophysicist), astrophysicist
- Gregory Wright (comics), comic book artist
