= Clyde J. Wright =

American editor and antisemite (1878–?)

Clyde James Wright (born 1878), was an American editor. He was responsible for the 1934, 71 page version of the antisemitic Protocols of the Meetings of the Learned Elders of Zion. It was an imprint of the Pyramid Book Shop, its publisher which at the time was located in Houston, Texas, but operated out of a postal box in Fairview Station
