= Mac Wright (disambiguation) =

Mac Wright may refer to:

- Mac Wright (born 1998), Australian cricketer
- Mack V. Wright (1894–1965), American actor and film director

== See also ==
- Max Wright, American actor
