= Louis Wright =

Louis Wright is the name of:

- Louis Wright (American football) (born 1953), former American football cornerback, teacher and assistant football coach
- Louis Booker Wright (1899–1984), American educator and librarian
- Louis C. Wright, American academic administrator, president of Baldwin-Wallace College from 1934 to 1948
- Louis T. Wright (1891–1952), American surgeon and civil rights activist
