= Lammar Wright =

Lammar Wright may refer to:

- Lammar Wright, Sr. (1905 or 1907–1973), jazz trumpeter
- Lammar Wright, Jr. (1924–1983), jazz trumpeter
