= Edmund Wright =

Edmund Wright may refer to:

- Edmund Wright (d.1583), MP for Steyning, Sussex
- Sir Edmund Wright (lord mayor) (died 1643), Lord Mayor of London
- Edmund Wright (architect) (1824–1888), architect and Mayor of Adelaide
- Edmund Wright (footballer) (1902–1978), English goalkeeper

== See also ==
- Edward Wright (mathematician) (1561–1615)
- E. M. Wright (1906–2005), mathematician
