= Gordon Wright =

Gordon Wright may refer to:

- Gordon Wright (footballer) (1884–1947), English Olympic footballer
- Gordon Wright (historian) (1912–2000), American historian
- Gordon Wright (politician) (1927–1990), Canadian lawyer and politician
- Gordon Wright (rugby league), Australian rugby league footballer
- Gordon Wright (architect), architect in New York State
