= Lord Wright =

Lord Wright may refer to:

- Robert Wright, Baron Wright (1869–1964), British judge
- Lewis Wright, Baron Wright of Ashton under Lyne (1903–1974), British politician and trade unionist
- Patrick Wright, Baron Wright of Richmond (born 1931), British diplomat
