= Malcolm Wright =

English cricketer

Personal information
- Full name: Malcolm Graeme Wright
- Born: 2 June 1926; Kandy, Central Province, British Ceylon
- Died: 20 December 1996 (aged 70); Cheltenham, Melbourne, Victoria, Australia
- Batting: Left-handed

Domestic team information
- Years: Team
- 1950: Oxford University

Career statistics
Competition	First-class
Matches	2
Runs scored	35
Batting average	8.75
100s/50s	0/0
Top score	17
Catches/stumpings	1/–
- Source: Cricinfo, 1 June 2020

Malcolm Graeme Wright (2 June 1926 – 20 December 1996) was a Sri Lankan first-class cricketer.

The son of Oswin Ansbert Wright, a member of an Anglo–Burgher family, he was born in British Ceylon at Kandy in June 1926. He studied in England at St Catherine's College at the University of Oxford. While studying at Oxford, he made two appearances in first-class cricket for Oxford University in 1950, against Warwickshire and Lancashire at Oxford. He scored 35 runs in his two matches, with a high score of 17.

Wright died in the Melbourne suburb of Cheltenham in December 1996, aged 70.
