= Susan Wright =

Sue or Susan Wright is the name of:

- Susan Mary Wright, birth name of Susan Barrantes (1937–1998), mother of Sarah, Duchess of York
- Susan Wright (actress) (1947–1991), Canadian actress
- Susan Webber Wright (born 1948), United States District Court judge
- Sue Wright (born 1970), English squash player
- Susan Wright (murderer) (born 1976), American woman convicted of killing her husband
- Susan Catherine Koerner Wright (1831–1889), mother of aviation pioneers the Wright Brothers
- Susan Wright (politician), committeewoman for the Texas State Republican Executive Committee and widow of former U.S. Representative Ron Wright (2019–2021)

== See also ==
- Suzanne Wright (born 1968), American artist
- Suzanne Wright (died 2016), co-founder of Autism Speaks
