= Nathan Wright =

Nathan Wright may refer to:

- Nathan Wright (judge) (1654–1721), English judge
- Nathan Wright (footballer) (born 1994), Australian rules footballer
- Nathan Wright (actor) (born 1979), British actor

== See also ==
- Nathaniel Wright (1785–1858), American businessman and lawyer
