= Anthony Wright =

Anthony or Antony or Tony Wright may refer to:

== Anthony ==
- Anthony Wright (American football) (born 1976), retired NFL quarterback
- Anthony Wright (field hockey) (born 1984), Canadian field hockey player, 2008 Olympian

== Antony ==
- Antony Grey, pseudonym for Anthony Edgar Gartside Wright (1927–2010), British author and civil rights activist

== Tony ==
- Tony Wright (actor) (1925–1986), English actor, married to Janet Munro
- Tony Wright (artist) (born 1949), produced images for Bob Dylan, Bob Marley and Traffic
- Tony Wright (Cannock Chase MP) (born 1948), former British Labour Party Member of Parliament for Cannock Chase
- Tony Wright (cricketer) (born 1962), English cricketer
- Tony Wright (Great Yarmouth MP) (born 1954), former British Labour Party Member of Parliament for Great Yarmouth
- Tony Wright (musician) (born 1968), lead singer of the UK band Terrorvision
- Tony Wright (Vanuatu) (born 1960), Member of the Cabinet of Vanuatu for Youth and Sports
- Tony Wright (sleep deprivation), English author and consciousness researcher

== See also ==
- VerseChorusVerse, Northern Irish musician, real name Tony Wright
