= Raymond Wright =

Raymond Wright may refer to:

- Raymond R. Wright (1945–1999), United States Army soldier and Medal of Honor recipient
- Raymond R. Wright (USMC) (1892–1964), United States Marine Corps officer
- Raymond Wright (rower) (born 1947), American rower
