= Robin M. Wright =

Robin M. Wright is an American philanthropist who supports the arts, focusing her efforts on Northern California arts nonprofits and cultural centers. Wright was co-chair of the board of the San Francisco Museum of Modern Art. In September 2024, Wright announced she would be supporting a new arts triennial initiative tilted the Further Triennial, debuting in 2027.
