= Owen Wright =

Owen Wright may refer to:

- Owen Wright (American football) (born 1999), American football player
- Owen Wright (musician), American musician
- Owen Wright (rugby league), New Zealand rugby league footballer
- Owen Wright (surfer) (born 1990), Australian surfer
