= Arthur Wright (footballer) =

English footballer

Personal information
- Full name: Arthur William Tempest Wright
- Date of birth: 23 September 1919
- Place of birth: Burradon, England
- Date of death: 27 May 1985 (aged 65)
- Place of death: Boldon, Tyne & Wear
- Position: Left half

Senior career*
Years	Team	Apps	(Gls)
1937–1955	Sunderland	281	(14)
- * Club domestic league appearances and goals

Arthur William Tempest Wright (23 September 1919 – 27 May 1985) was an English footballer who played as a left half. A former England schoolboy international, Wright spent his entire club career with Sunderland.He was signed at the age of 14 after 3 appearances for England schoolboys. He made his first team debut (at the age of 18) against Leeds at Roker Park on 16 April 1938. He went on to make 281 league and FA Cup appearances for the club with his final league game being at Sheff Utd on 14 March 1955. Touted many times for an England cap, in season 48–49 he represented the Football League and was then selected for a full England call up on an end of season tour to Europe. After retiring, he joined the club's coaching staff.
