= Katherine Wright =

Katherine Wright or Catherine Wright may refer to:

- Katherine Fairfax Wright, American filmmaker and documentarian
- Katherine Wright (field hockey) (born 1989), Canadian field hockey player
- Catherine Wright (high jumper), American high jumper, winner of the 1923 USA Outdoor Track and Field Championships

== See also ==
- Katie Wright (Kathryn Wright, born 1981), American actress
- Katharine Wright (1874–1929), sister of aviation pioneers Wilbur and Orville Wright
