= Alison Wright (disambiguation) =

Alison Wright (born 1976) is an English actress.

Alison Wright may also refer to:

- Alison Wright (photojournalist) (born 1961), American photojournalist and writer
- Alison Wright (cyclist) (born 1980), Australian cyclist
- Alison Wright (athlete) (born 1949), New Zealand middle-distance runner

== See also ==
- Allison Wright (1965–2024), England archer
