= Louise Wright =

Louise Wright may refer to:

- Louise Wright (canoeist)
- Louise Wright (activist) (1861–1935)
- Louise Wright (illustrator) (1863–?)
- Louise Wright (architect)
