= Amy Wright (disambiguation) =

Amy Wright may refer to:

- Amy Wright (born 1950), American actress and former model
- Amy Wright (activist) (born 1975), American advocate for disabled people
- Amy Wright (curler) (born 1964), American curler
- Amy Wright (writer), American writer
- Amy Wright (basketball) (born 1980), American basketball coach
