= Margaret Wright =

Margaret or Peggy Wright may refer to:

- Margaret Wright (British politician) (1940–2012), British Green Party politician
- Margaret Wright (American politician) (1921–1996), U.S. presidential candidate in 1976
- Margaret Wright (lighthouse keeper) (1854–1933), Welsh rescuer of the Mumbles lifeboat crew
- Margaret H. Wright (born 1944), American computer scientist
- Margaret Theresa Robertson Wright (1789–1878), Texas pioneer and patriot, aka. "the Mother of Texas"
- Peggy Wright, Canadian politician
- Margaret Wright, fictional character on the U.S. TV series So Help Me Todd
- Margaret Wright (discus thrower) (born 1919), winner of the 1935 USA Outdoor Track and Field Championships
