= Antoine Wright =

Antoine Wright may refer to:

- Antoine Wright (politician) (born 1960), Vanuatuan politician
- Antoine Wright (basketball) (born 1984), American basketball player
