= Chester Wright =

Chester Wright may refer to:

- Chester Ellis Wright (1897–1933), American World War I flying ace
- Chester W. Wright (1879–1966), American economic historian
