= Claire Wright =

Claire Wright may refer to:

- Claire Wright (gymnast) (born 1979), British trampoline gymnast
- Claire Wright (water polo) (born 1994), Canadian water polo player

== See also ==
- Clare Wright (born 1969), American Australian historian, author and broadcaster
