= Craig Wright =

Craig Wright may refer to:

- Craig Wright (cricketer) (born 1974), Scottish cricketer
- Craig Wright (rugby union) (born 2004), English rugby union player
- Craig Wright (playwright) (born 1965), American playwright, television writer, and producer
- Craig M. Wright (born 1944), Henry L. and Lucy G. Moses Professor of Music at Yale University
- Craig R. Wright (20th Century), American baseball writer and proponent of sabermetrics
- Craig Steven Wright (born 1970), Australian computer scientist, cryptocurrency investor and businessman

== See also ==
- J. Craig Wright (1929–2010), American lawyer and judge, justice of the Ohio Supreme Court
