= Wayne Wright =

Wayne Wright may refer to:

- Wayne D. Wright (1916–2003), American Hall of Fame and National Champion Thoroughbred horse racing jockey
- Wayne P. Wright (born 1951), tenth bishop of the Episcopal Diocese of Delaware from 1998 to 2017
