= Imogen Wright =

South African software developer and bioinformatician

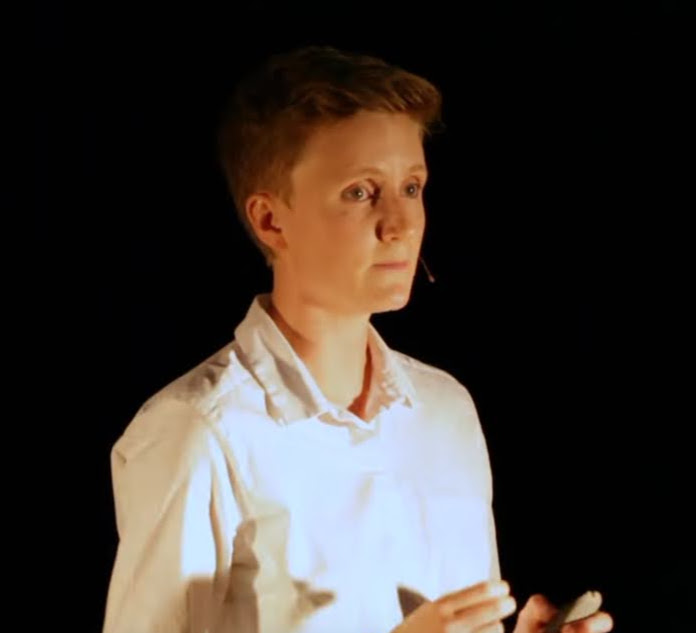
- Wright in 2017
- Born: Imogen Abigail Wright; January 21, 1986 (age 40); Grahamstown, South Africa
- Education: University of the Western Cape
- Occupations: Bioinformatician; entrepreneur
- Known for: Co-founder of Hyrax Biosciences

Imogen Wright is a South African software developer and bioinformatician. She is co-founder and CTO of Hyrax Biosciences, a software development company specialising in DNA analysis programs.

== Education ==
She earned a Bachelor of Science in computer science and Physics at Rhodes University. They then earned a Master of Science in theoretical physics at the Perimeter Institute in Canada. In 2015 the also earned a PhD in bioinformatics from the University of Western Cape.

== Career ==
In the past Wright has worked for Skimlinks. They were senior software developer and team leader at the big data startup in London. Wright also worked for the Amazon EC2 compute team as a software development engineer. They were a UWC-SANBI (University of the Western Cape’s South African Bioinformatics Institute) post-doctoral research fellow.

== Awards ==
Wright was the 2016 runner-up for the Innovation Prize for Africa. She won the prize of $25,000 for Exatype, a piece of software developed by Hyrax Biosciences. Exatype is genotyping and drug-resistance testing software, initially used for HIV-positive patients. They were also invited to, but did not attend, the five-week TechWoman program in 2016. From 2300 applicants they were one of 90 chosen. The program was started by former Secretary of State Hillary Clinton in 2011.

== Publications ==
- The Conversation: How South Africa can stop HIV drug resistance in its tracks (May 22, 2015)
- Nucleic Acids Research: RAMICS: trainable, high-speed and biologically relevant alignment of high-throughput sequencing reads to coding DNA (May 26, 2014)
- The Journal of Immunology: Ability To Develop Broadly Neutralizing HIV-1 Antibodies Is Not Restricted by the Germline Ig Gene Repertoire (April 17, 2015)
- Google Scholar, patents: Testing the operation of an application programming interface (October 14, 2014)
- Journal of Virology: Intact HIV Proviruses Persist in Children Seven to Nine Years after Initiation of Antiretroviral Therapy in the First Year of Life (31 January 2020)
- Retrovirology: HIVIntact: a python-based tool for HIV-1 genome intactness inference (27 June 2021)
