= Gavin Wright (biochemist) =

English molecular biochemist and former cricketer

Gavin Wright FMedSci
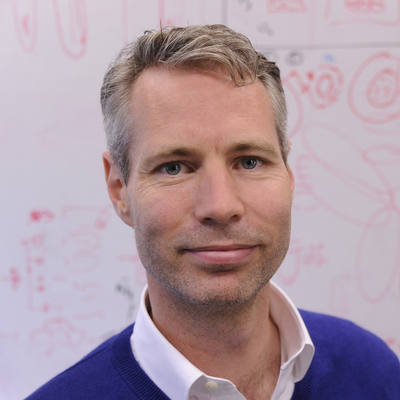
- Born: Gavin James Wright; 15 December 1973 (age 52); Holmfirth, Yorkshire, England
- Education: University of Oxford (Balliol College)
- Known for: AVEXIS technique; RH5–basigin malaria research; CD200–CD200R interaction; JUNO–IZUMO1 fertilization receptor pair
- Awards: Fellow of the Academy of Medical Sciences (2023)
- Scientific career
- Fields: Biochemistry, Microbial biochemistry, Parasitology
- Workplaces: Hull York Medical School, University of York, Wellcome Sanger Institute
- Thesis: Interactions of the OX-2 lymphoid/neuronal glycoprotein (1999)
- Doctoral advisor: A. Neil Barclay; Marion H. Brown
- Website: wright-lab.org

Gavin James Wright FMedSci (born 15 December 1973) is an English molecular biochemist, academic, and former first-class cricketer. He is Chair of Microbial Biochemistry at the Hull York Medical School, University of York.

== Early life and education ==
Wright was born at Holmfirth, West Yorkshire, in December 1973. He attended Greenhead College in Huddersfield, earning four A-levels in science and mathematics, before studying at Balliol College, University of Oxford. He graduated in 1996 with an M.Biochem. degree with first-class honours, then completed doctoral research in molecular immunology at the University of Oxford, receiving his D.Phil. in 2000. His doctoral thesis was supervised by A. Neil Barclay and Marion H. Brown and entitled Interactions of the OX-2 lymphoid/neuronal glycoprotein.

== Academic career ==
From 2000 to 2003, Wright held an Imperial Cancer Research Fund (ICRF) Research Fellowship in London. He joined the Wellcome Trust Sanger Institute in 2003 as a Junior Fellow, later becoming a Group Leader in 2008 and Senior Group Leader in 2014. In 2021, he was appointed Professor in the Department of Biology at the Hull York Medical School, University of York, where he leads research in microbial biochemistry. His work on extracellular protein interactions has contributed to the development of diagnostics, treatments, and vaccines for tropical parasitic diseases including malaria, leishmaniasis, and trypanosomiasis.

== Research ==
Wright's research focuses on extracellular interactions mediated by cell surface receptor proteins, particularly in host–parasite systems. He developed the AVEXIS technique to detect low-affinity interactions between membrane proteins, which led to the discovery of the essential interaction between the Plasmodium falciparum protein RH5 and the human erythrocyte receptor basigin. This overturned earlier models of erythrocyte invasion and provided the basis for RH5-based malaria vaccine development. His group has since characterised other components of the RH5 complex, investigated therapeutic antibody strategies targeting basigin, and examined the evolutionary origins of the RH5 gene.

Beyond malaria, Wright's laboratory has used recombinant protein approaches to identify invariant parasite surface proteins, including antigens conferring sterile protection against Trypanosoma vivax in a murine model. These results supported the feasibility of subunit vaccines for trypanosomes. He has also developed large-scale protein expression methods to produce full ectodomains of parasite proteins, facilitating serological studies, structural biology, and reverse vaccinology across multiple parasitic species.

In immunology, Wright's PhD work identified the CD200 receptor (CD200R) as the binding partner for CD200 (then known as OX-2), establishing the molecular basis of this immunoregulatory pathway.

Another major contribution was the identification of JUNO as the egg receptor for IZUMO1, showing that this interaction is essential for mammalian fertilization. The loss of JUNO from the egg surface after fertilization provided a molecular explanation for the membrane block to polyspermy. His group has also published follow-up studies exploring additional molecular aspects of gamete recognition.

== Honours ==
Wright was elected a Fellow of the Academy of Medical Sciences in 2023. He is a member of the British Society for Parasitology and the British Society for Immunology.

== Cricket career ==
While at Oxford, Wright played first-class cricket for Oxford University on four occasions, making one appearance in 1996 and three in 1997. A right-arm medium pace bowler, he took a single wicket from 55 overs bowled, conceding 279 runs.
