= Attorney General Wright =

Attorney General Wright may refer to:

- James Wright (governor) (1716–1785), Attorney General of the Province of South Carolina
- Jeremy Wright (born 1972), Attorney General for England and Wales
- Luke Edward Wright (1846–1922), Attorney General of Tennessee
