= Belinda Wright =

Belinda Wright may refer to:

- Belinda Wright (conservationist) (born 1953), wildlife photographer and wildlife conservationist in India
- Belinda Wright (softball) (born 1980), softball player from Australia
- Belinda Wright (dancer) (1929–2007), English ballerina
