= Alice Wright (disambiguation) =

Alice Wright (born 1994) is a British runner.

Alice Wright may also refer to:

- Alice Buck Norwood Spearman Wright (1902–1989), American activist
- Alice Morgan Wright (1881–1975), American sculptor
