= Kevin Wright =

Kevin Wright may refer to:

- Kevin Wright (cricketer) (born 1953), Australian cricketer
- Kevin Wright (Australian footballer) (1933–2003), Australian rules footballer
- Kevin Wright (footballer, born 1995), Sierra Leonean footballer
- Kevin Wright (producer)
