= Isaac Wright =

Isaac Wright may refer to:

- Isaac Wright (investor) (1760–1832), American investor
- Isaac Wright Jr. (born 1962), American lawyer
- Isaac Hempstead Wright (born 1999), British actor
