= Ian Wright (disambiguation) =

Ian Wright (born 1963) is an English football striker, who played for Crystal Palace, Arsenal and England, and is now a television presenter.

Ian Wright may also refer to:

- Ian Wright (engineer), co-founder of Tesla Motors
- Ian Wright (footballer, born 1972), English football defender, who played for Bristol Rovers, Hull City and Hereford United, amongst others
- Ian Wright (illustrator) (born 1953)
- Ian Wright (motorsport) (British motorsport engineer)
- Ian Wright (percussionist), British classical percussionist
- Ian Wright (rower) (born 1961), New Zealand Olympic rower
- Ian Wright (rugby union) (1945–2000), English rugby union player

== See also ==
- Iain Wright (born 1972), British Labour politician
