= Governor Wright =

Governor Wright may refer to:

- Andrew Barkworth Wright (1895–1971), Governor of British Cyprus from 1949 to 1954 and Governor of the Gambia from 1947 to 1949
- Fielding L. Wright (1895–1956), 49th and 50th Governor of Mississippi
- James Wright (governor) (1716–1785), 7th Royal Governor of Carolina and Georgia from 1760 to 1776
- Joseph A. Wright (1810–1867), 10th Governor of Indiana
- Luke Edward Wright (1846–1922), Governor-General of the Philippines from 1904 to 1906
- Robert Wright (Maryland politician) (1752–1826), 12th Governor of Maryland
- Silas Wright (1795–1847), 14th Governor of New York

== See also ==
- SS Governor Wright, from List of shipwrecks in December 1941
