= Stan Wright =

Stan Wright may refer to:

- Stan Wright (rugby union) (born 1978), Cook Islands international rugby union player
- Stan Wright (track coach) (1921–1998), first black head coach of a United States track and field team
- Stan Wright (Australian rules footballer) (1918–1992), Australian rules footballer
