= Keith Wright =

Keith Wright may refer to:

- Keith Wright (wide receiver) (born 1956), former NFL football wide receiver
- Keith Wright (defensive tackle) (born 1980), former NFL football defensive tackle
- Keith Wright (Australian politician) (1942–2015), former Australian politician
- Keith Wright (footballer) (born 1965), Scottish former international footballer who played as a striker
- Keith Wright (ice hockey) (born 1944), retired Canadian professional ice hockey right winger
- Keith L. T. Wright (born 1955), American politician, member of the New York State Assembly
- Keith Wright (basketball) (born 1989), basketball player who played for the Harvard Crimson
