= Wallace Wright (disambiguation) =

Wallace Wright (born 1984) is an American football player.

Wallace Wright may also refer to:

- Wallace Wright (footballer) (1912–??), Scottish footballer
- Wallace Duffield Wright (1875–1953), British soldier
