= Mars Wright =

LGBTQ fashion designer

Mars Elliot Wright (born 1995) is an American clothing designer who owns an LGBTQ-themed fashion company.

== Biography ==
Wright grew up in Joshua Tree, California. In 2017, Wright transitioned from female to male, moving to Los Angeles in order to do so safely. His Life on Mars clothing brand features LGBTQ-themed designs on t-shirts, face masks, hoodies, hats and tote bags. In 2007, Wright donated 25% of proceeds from clothing sales to Trans Lifeline, a charity which provides a crisis hotline for transgender people.
