= Julian Wright (historian) =

British historian

- Born: 9 June 1974 (age 52)
- Occupation: Academic historian
- Employer: Northumbria University
- Title: Professor
- Parent: N.T. Wright (father)

Julian Wright is Professor of History at Northumbria University. He was Head of Humanities from 2017 to 2022. He works on modern culture and ideas in Europe, particularly in France, and is studying experiences of time during the Second World War.

Between 2007 and 2022 he was musical director of The Durham Singers.

== Bibliography ==
- The Regionalist Movement in France, 1890-1914: Jean Charles-Brun and French Political Thought (Oxford University Press, 2003)
- Socialism and the Experience of Time: Idealism and the Present in Modern France (Oxford University Press, 2017)
