= Oliver Wright =

Ollie or Oliver Wright may refer to:

- Oliver Wright (boxer) (1947–2018)
- Oliver Wright (diplomat) (1922–2009)
- Oliver Wright (trade unionist) (1881–1938)
- Ollie Wright (footballer, born 1999), English midfielder
- Ollie Wright (footballer, born 2002), English goalkeeper
