= Ysabel Wright =

American botanist (1885-1960)

Ysabel Galbán Wright (December 25, 1885 – July 1, 1960) was a Cuban-American botanist and plant collector who specialized in cacti.

== Early life ==
Ysabel Suárez Galbán was born into a wealthy family in Havana, Cuba on December 25, 1885. Her father, Luis Suárez Galbán grew up between the small towns of Guía and Gáldar on the Spanish Atlantic island of Gran Canaria. Galbán emigrated to Cuba at the age of 15 and built a fortune in the sugar industry and other businesses. He later partnered with Venezuelan financier Heriberto Lobo and, through the firm Galbán Lobo y Compañía, the families owned several sugar estates in Cuba as well as the Cuban National Bank.

By 1899, Galbán had moved to New York City and become a director of the North American Trust Company.

One of Ysabel's brothers was deaf and became a pupil at the Wright Oral School for the Deaf in New York City. It likely was there that Ysabel met the school's founder John Dutton Wright. Wright was a pioneer in the education of deaf and "deaf-mute" children; Helen Keller was one of his school's first pupils, spending two years there.

== Marriage ==
On November 25, 1912, 26-year-old Ysabel married Wright, who was 46. The wedding took place at Luis Suárez Galbán's apartments in the Hotel Majestic on Central Park West, a luxury hotel that in this period was home to Gustav Mahler, Edna Ferber and the young Dorothy Parker.

Ysabel and John set up home in New York City and had two children: John Suarez (John Jr.) and Anna Dutton Wright, born December 26, 1916. Ysabel's father, Luis Suárez Galbán, died in 1917. By that time, the Wright family was living in Yonkers where on July 6, 1918, Ysabel and John hosted Helen Keller, who was traveling to Los Angeles for filming of Deliverance, a silent film about her life. Keller played in the garden with the Wright's children, climbing up to a treehouse, and shared reminiscences with a group of former schoolmates from the Wright Oral School. After the United States' entry into the First World War, Ysabel volunteered with the War Camp Community Service, an initiative of the Playground Association of America.

== Quien Sabe? and botanical work ==
After the war, the Wright family relocated to Santa Barbara, California around 1919. They bought a house on a 27-acre (11 ha) site at Montecito and renamed the estate "Quien Sabe?". They commissioned Colonial Revival architect George Washington Smith to design a grand new house, based on a manor house John Wright remembered from a trip to Spain. Ultimately, only Smith's service block design was ever built.

To surround the house, Ysabel had landscape architect Peter Riedel design a garden of many terraces, each dedicated to the plants of a particular type or region. There was an olive grove and a citrus orchard, herbaceous gardens with blue and red themes, an Australian garden and a South African garden, all watched over by a staff of eight gardeners. Most notable among the many gardens was the cactus and succulent garden, which grew to include many rare species.

Although they had a large house and a new garden to organize, the Wrights also found time for extensive foreign travel from 1920 onwards, often driven by John's work with education of deaf children. They traveled to South America aboard the SS Vestris, to India (with their children) and to Japan where John advocated for Japan's first oral school for the deaf.

It appears that the new garden and her international travel stimulated Ysabel's interest in botany. Back at Quien Sabe? she continued to develop the garden but started to correspond with botanists specializing in cacti.

The Quien Sabe? cactus collection became internationally known and was photographed for the 1936 Country Life Book of Gardens.

As well as collecting cacti, Ysabel also took an interest in California's native flora. In July 1929, she took a trip to Mono and Tuolumne counties in the Sierra Nevada and collected more than 160 plant specimens, most of which are now held in the Santa Barbara Botanic Garden herbarium, recorded under her married name, Mrs. J. D. Wright.

In the late 1930s, with John Wright growing elderly, the couple spent more of their time in New York, near the Wright Oral School. On July 15, 1940, the Wright's daughter, Anna, married Thomas Drumheller, son of a sheep-farming family from Walla Walla, Washington, in New York City.

From 1937 to 1942, Ysabel and John rented Quien Sabe? to Donald Culross Peattie and his wife Louise. At the garden's height, Ysabel Wright had employed eight gardeners to maintain the grounds; by the time the Peatties moved in, only Japanese-born Hideko was left.

During this time the Wrights also subdivided the estate, selling off portions on which new houses were built.

A few years later, realizing that she was unlikely to return to live at Quien Sabe?, Ysabel donated her rarest cacti to Ganna Walska's Lotusland and the Huntington Botanical Gardens in 1941 and 1942.

The cactus species Turbinicarpus ysabelae is named in her honor. In 1925, the herpetologist Edward Harrison Taylor names two reptile species for members of the Wright family: Sphenomorphus wrighti for J.D. Wright and Brachymeles wrighti for Ysabel's son, John Suarez Wright.

The standard author abbreviation Y.Wright is used to indicate this person as the author when citing a botanical name.

== Sources ==
- "Archives West: John Dutton Wright photograph collection, circa 1920–1924". archiveswest.orbiscascade.org.
- Beolens, Bo; Watkins, Michael; Grayson, Michael (2011). The Eponym Dictionary of Reptiles. JHU Press. p. 290. ISBN 9781421401355.
- "Mr. and Mrs. John D. Wright". Country Life's Book of Gardens. Country Life. 1936. pp. 28–29.
- Denise (September 5, 2015). "Lotusland, garden provocateur". A Growing Obsession. "From 1928 to 1942, Ysabel Wright made a garden in Montecito that in its brief lifespan held the world's largest collection of cactus, with visitors like Albert Einstein. The March–April 2015 Cactus and Succulent Journal has a wonderful piece on this garden by Catherine Phillips entitled "The Lost Cactus Garden of 'Quien Sabe.'" Both Lotusland and the Huntington Desert Garden procured plants from Quien Sabe as the collection was dispersed."
- Eggli, Urs; Newton, Leonard E. (2004). Etymological Dictionary of Succulent Plant Names. Springer Science & Business Media. p. 263. ISBN 9783540004899.
- Holmes, Frank R., ed. (1924). "Wright, John Dutton". Who's Who in New York City and State. Vol. 8. p. 1403.
- Longville, Tim (2015). "Donald Culross Peattie: A Naturalist in California" (PDF). Eden: Journal of the California Garden & Landscape History Society. 18 (2): 3–8. "Ysabel Wright was much involved in the garden. She devoted a major section of it to her remarkable cactus collection, which soon acquired an international reputation....In 1941 and 1942, Ysabel Wright donated her rarest cacti to Ganna Walska and The Huntington Botanical Gardens."
- Maddams, W. F. (1961). "What's in a Name?". The Cactus and Succulent Journal of Great Britain. 23 (2): 32–34. JSTOR 24674316.
- "Prof. J. D. Wright Weds Miss Galban". New York Times. Vol. 62, no. 20, 030. November 26, 1912. p. 15 – via Newspapers.com.
- Peattie, Donald Culross (1939). Flowering Earth. Trinity University Press. ISBN 9781595341785.
- "Guía: Presentación del Nuevo Libro de Sergio Aguiar sobre Luis Suárez Galbán" [Guía: Presentation on the New Book by Sergio Aguiar on Luis Suárez Galbán]. Radio Faro del Noreste (in Spanish). April 17, 2018.
- Rathbone, John Paul (2010). The Sugar King of Havana: The Rise and Fall of Julio Lobo, Cuba's Last Tycoon. Penguin. ISBN 9781101458914.
- Tiehm, Arnold "Jerry" (January–February 2020). "Herbarium databases: Mrs. J. D. Wright and Aurora—yes, there is a problem" (PDF). CNPS Bristlecone Chapter Newsletter. 41 (1).
- "United States passport application". FamilySearch. 1917.
- "Helen Keller in the Wright Garden". The Volta Review. 20 (11). Volta Bureau: 713–715. November 1918.
- Wright, Ysabel (October 1918). "Letters to the Editor". The Volta Review. 20 (10). Volta Bureau: 664–665.
