= Kyle Wright =

Kyle Wright may refer to:

- Kyle Wright (baseball) (born 1995), baseball player
- Kyle Wright (American football) (born 1984), American football player
