= Ethel Wright =

Ethel Wright may refer to:

- Ethel Wright (actor) (1851–1930), US film actress
- Ethel Wright (painter) (1866–1939), UK painter
- Ethel Wright Mohamed (1906–1992), US artist
