= Ryan Wright =

Ryan Wright may refer to:

- Ryan Wright (rugby league) (born 1991)
- Ryan Wright (American football) (born 2000)
