= Ronald Wright (disambiguation) =

Ronald Wright (born 1948) is a Canadian author.

Ronald Wright or Ron Wright may also refer to:

- Ron Wright (baseball) (born 1976), American baseball player
- Winky Wright (Ronald Lamont Wright, born 1971), American boxer
- Ron Wright (umpire) (1913–1968), Australian cricket umpire
- Ronald Wright (cricketer) (1903–1992), English cricketer
- Ronald Wright (rugby union) (1949–1983), Scotland international rugby union player
- Ron Wright (footballer) (1929–2001), Australian rules footballer
- Ron Wright (politician) (1953–2021), member of the United States House of Representatives
- Ron Wright (wrestler) (1938–2015), American professional wrestler
- Ronnie Selby Wright (1908–1995), Church of Scotland minister
