= Scott Wright =

Scott Wright may refer to:

- Scott Wright (actor) (born 1974), British actor
- Mr. Scott Wright (born 1977), American professional wrestler
- Scott Wright (footballer) (born 1997), Scottish football player
- Scott Olin Wright (1923–2016), United States federal judge
- Scott Wright, better known as Micromax, fictional mutant superhero of the Marvel universe
