= Carl Wright =

Carl Wright may refer to:

- Carl Wright (actor) (1932–2007), American tap dancer and actor
- Carl Wright (bishop) (born 1959), American Episcopal bishop
- Carl Wright (civil servant) (born 1950), British former director of the CTUG and Secretary-General of CLGF
- Carl Wright (cricketer) (born 1977), Jamaican-born American cricketer
- Carl P. Wright (1893–1961), Norwegian politician for the Conservative Party
