= Martin Wright =

Martin Wright may refer to:

== Sportspeople ==
- Martin Wright (bobsledder) (born 1974), British competitor at the 2006 Winter Olympics
- Martin Wright (cricketer, born 1934), former Norfolk cricketer
- Martin Wright (cricketer, born 1963), former Hertfordshire cricketer

== Others ==
- Martin Wright (bioengineer) (1912–2001), British bioengineer
- Martin Wright (conductor) (born 1955), American conductor
- The owner of classical music label Move Records

== See also ==
- The Boogeyman (wrestler), professional wrestler born Marty Wright
