= R. L. Wright =

Ronald Wright
- Born: Baltimore, Maryland, US
- Occupations: Public Safety Activist, Pastor, writer
- Writing career
- Pen name: Dr. R. L. Wright
- Genre: True crime
- Website: marylandduiclasses.com

Ronald Wright is an American Baptist pastor, fiction writer, retired police officer (Baltimore Police Department) and retired detective (Maryland State Police). He has written numerous true crime, spiritual christian literature and books, in addition to authoritative books on addiction and narcotics. These books are often self-help themed. He teaches free driving under the influence (DUI) classes and has been a public safety activist since 2006.

== Background ==
Ronald Wright has served as the Pastor for Merritt Park Baptist Church in Dundalk, Maryland since 1976. He earned his doctorate at the Newburgh Theological Seminary in Christian Counselling. Wright has also provided "The Alpha Program" free of charge to his local community which "is a diversion program that is designed to help attendees to get control of their lives and to understand the consequences of driving under the influence of drugs and alcohol." Previously, he was a Baltimore City Police officer from 1968 and transitioned into Police Narcotics Detective in 1969 until 1976.

== Activism ==
=== Church property ===
In part of a potentially illegal auction of public parkland, Merritt Park Baptist Church came into the crosshairs of the Baltimore County Government. Merritt Park Baptist Church borders the property of the auctioned parkland.

Wright went on WCBM radio in 2017, stating on public record that the local government (Baltimore County) wanted the Merritt Park Baptist Church property and made an accusation of a zoning problem. Furthermore, he states he and his church were harassed for 7 years by [Baltimore County] and the State of [Maryland]. Specifically, agencies such as the Department of Parole and Probation, the Department of Health and Mental Hygiene, the Motor Vehicle Administration and others. The Fire Marshall and threatened to close the church and the government sent cease and desist order to stop the free public safety Alpha program which had been opened for 40 years.

=== Alpha Program, defending free speech ===
After Wright was ordered to cease and desist the Alpha Program and was accused of wrong-doing, he demanded that the state "initiate the criminal process, either by charging the defendants he has named in his complaint or, conversely, charging himself." "[T]he Executive Branch has exclusive authority and absolute discretion to decide whether to prosecute a case." The state dismissed the case. "As to Wright’s First Amendment claims, Wright asserts that the defendants denied him "the right to assemble for a public meeting inside the Merritt Park Baptist Church[,] denying [him] the right to free speech [and] denied [him] the peaceful assembly [sic].""

== Bibliography ==
- When This Life Ends a New Life Begins (2018) (Brentwood Christian Press)
- The Consequence for Making Bad Decisions (2008) (ISBN 978-1595814722) (Brentwood Christian Press)
- Lucifer's Hammer (2003) (ASIN B0029YBZ6I) (Brentwood Christian Press)
- Someone's Child (Brentwood Christian Press)
- Over The Edge (2004, 2017) (Brentwood Christian Press)
- Accepting Responsibility for Your DUI or CDS Charges (Brentwood Christian Press)
- Understanding Addiction (Brentwood Christian Press)
- Maryland .08 (Brentwood Christian Press)
- In The Line of Duty (2007) (ISBN 978-1595813312) (Brentwood Christian Press)
- Drugs! Know Your Enemy (Brentwood Christian Press)
- Street Smart (2004) (ISBN 978-1595810144) (Brentwood Christian Press)
