= Sophie Wright =

Sophie Wright may refer to:

- Sophie B. Wright (1866–1912), New Orleans educator
- Sophie Wright (actress) (born 1990), Australian actress
- Sophie Wright (Emmerdale), fictional character on British TV show Emmerdale in 1996–1997
- Sophie Wright (chef), British chef
- Sophie Wright (cyclist) (born 1999), British cyclist
