= Admiral Wright =

Admiral Wright may refer to:

- Carleton H. Wright (1892–1973), U.S. Navy rear admiral
- Garland Wright (born 1954), U.S. Navy rear admiral
- Jerauld Wright (1898–1995), U.S. Navy admiral
- Royston Wright (1908–1977), British Royal Navy admiral
- Thomas Charles Wright (1799–1868), Irish-born Ecuadorian Navy admiral
