= Simon Wright =

Simon Wright may refer to:

- Simon Wright (musician) (born 1963), English drummer (ex-AC/DC drummer)
- Simon Wright (politician) (born 1979), British Liberal Democrat politician, Member of Parliament for Norwich South 2010-15
- Simon Wright (food writer), broadcaster and food writer
- Simon Wright, supporting character in Captain Future
