= Leslie Wright =

Leslie Wright may refer to:

- Leslie Wright (cricketer) (1903–1956), English cricketer
- Leslie Wright (priest) (1899–1972), Anglican priest
- Leslie Stephen Wright (1913–1997), American educator
- Leslie Wright (pianist) (born 1938), Ecuadorian pianist
