= Marcus Wright =

Marcus Wright may refer to:

- Marc Wright (Marcus Snowell Wright, 1890–1975), American athlete
- Marcus Joseph Wright (1831–1922), lawyer, author, and Confederate general
- Marcus Wright, a character from Terminator Salvation
