= Marshall Wright =

Marshall Wright may refer to:

- Marshall Wright (diplomat) (1926–2013), American politician
- Marshall Wright (historian), American historian
- Marshall Wright (politician) (born 1976), American lawyer
