= Warren Wright =

Warren Wright may refer to:

- Warren Wright (politician) (1893–1962), American politician in Illinois
- Warren Wright Sr. (1875–1950), American racehorse owner and breeder

== See also ==
- Warren T. Wright Farmhouse Site, Sussex County, Delaware
