= Darren Wright =

Darren Wright may refer to:

- Darren Wright (rugby) (born 1968), English rugby league and rugby union player
- Darren Wright (footballer, born 1968), English footballer
- Darren Wright (footballer, born 1979), English footballer
