= Roy Wright =

Roy Wright may refer to:

- Roy V. Wright (1876–1948), member of the New Jersey State Senate
- Roy Wright (physiologist) (1907–1990), Australian physiologist
- Roy Wright (1918–1959), one of the Scottsboro Boys
- Roy Wright (footballer) (1929–2002), Australian football player
- Roy Wright (baseball) (1933–2018), American baseball pitcher
- Roy Wright (journalist), British editor The Daily Express in the 1970s
