= Hugh Wright =

Hugh Wright may refer to:

- Hugh Wright (rugby union) (1875–1953), Scottish rugby union footballer
- Hugh Wright (schoolmaster) (born 1938), English schoolmaster
- Hugh E. Wright (1879–1940), French-English actor
