= Mark Wright =

Mark Wright may refer to:

== Sports ==
- Mark Wright (footballer, born 1963), English international football player and manager
- Mark Wright (footballer, born 1970), English footballer
- Mark Wright (footballer, born 1981), English footballer
- Mark Wright (footballer, born 1982), English footballer
- Mark Wright (footballer, born 1987), English footballer (Crawley Town) and TV personality
- Mark Wright (cricketer) (born 1981), English cricketer
- Mark Wright (rugby league) (1955–2017), Australian rugby league player

== Others ==
- Mark Wright (entrepreneur) (born 1989), contestant on series ten of the UK version of The Apprentice
- Mark Wright (British Army soldier) (1979–2006), British soldier in the Parachute Regiment and recipient of the George Cross
- Mark Wright (British politician) (born 1974), Bristol, England councillor
- Mark Wright (record producer) (born 1957), American record producer and songwriter
- Mark Wright (TV personality) (born 1987), English television and radio presenter
- Mark Peter Wright (born 1979), British artist
- Mark Wright (actor), New Zealand actor
- Mark Wright (Louisiana politician), member of the Louisiana House of Representatives

== See also ==
- Marc Wright (1890–1975), American pole vaulter
