= Kenneth W. Wright =

Kenneth W. Wright is as a minister of the New Iberia Church of Christ in New Iberia, Louisiana. Wright was born in 1945 in Houston, Texas, the only child of William and Mildred Wright. His father was an electrician for the Houston Lighting and Power Company, while his mother was a homemaker.

Wright attended the University of Houston, the Houston Preachers Educational School, and the Preston Road School of Preaching in Dallas, Texas. He received his Master of Theology degree from Bethel Theological Seminary in Pensacola, Florida.

Initially, Wright wanted to work in the entertainment industry. During his early years he formed a band and composed several popular songs. But, there was always a desire to do something more meaningful. He began preaching full-time in Cleveland, Texas for the Westside Church of Christ wherein he established the Westside School of Biblical Studies. In 1994 he preached for the Hazlehurst Church of Christ in Hazlehurst, Georgia. At that time he was instrumental in establishing the Southeastern Georgia School of Biblical Studies in Waycross, Georgia.

In 2005 Ken became the driving force behind establishing the In Light of the Word television program which is viewed throughout southern Louisiana. This program has been the springboard to other outreach ministries such as a worldwide outreach via the internet. To date the program has received responses from over twenty-six countries throughout the world.

Wright has been inducted into the 2007-2008 edition of the Heritage Registry of Who’s Who for his accomplishments and achievements with the New Iberia Church of Christ.
