= Adam Wright =

Adam Wright may refer to:

- Adam Wright (rugby league) (1975–1998), Australian rugby league footballer
- Adam Wright (water polo) (born 1977), American water polo player and college water polo head coach
