= Donald Wright (disambiguation) =

Donald Wright (1907–1985) was Chief Justice of the Supreme Court of California, 1970–1977.

Donald or Don Wright may also refer to:

- Donald O. Wright (1892–1985), Minnesota Lieutenant Governor, 1953–1955
- Donald Wright (schoolmaster) (1923–2012), English schoolmaster
- Don Wright (athlete) (born 1959), Australian Olympic high hurdler
- Don Wright (cartoonist) (1934–2024), American editorial cartoonist
- Don Wright (composer) (1908–2006), Canadian composer and musician
- Don Wright (politician) (1929–2014), American politician and perennial candidate
- Don J. Wright, American physician, government official and diplomat
- Don Wright (rugby union) (1902–1966), New Zealand international rugby union player
- Donald Wright (New Hampshire politician), American politician
