= Jason Wright (astronomer) =

American astronomer

- Born: Jason Thomas Wright
- Education: Boston University; University of California, Berkeley
- Scientific career
- Fields: Astronomy
- Workplaces: Pennsylvania State University
- Thesis: Stellar Magnetic Activity and the Detection of Exoplanets (2006)
- Doctoral advisor: Geoffrey Marcy

Jason Thomas Wright is an American astronomer. He is a professor in the Department of Astronomy and Astrophysics in the Eberly College of Science at Pennsylvania State University, where he also serves as director of the Penn State Extraterrestrial Intelligence Center. He is known for his research on the search for extraterrestrial intelligence, particularly regarding the search for technosignatures.
