= Milton Wright =

Milton Wright may refer to:

- Milton Wright (bishop) (1828–1917), father of the Wright brothers
- Milton Wright (academic) (1903–1972), American academic who studied in Germany
- Milton Wright (American football) (born 2000), American football player
