= Jane Wright (entomologist) =

Canadian-Australian entomologist

- Born: 1954 (age 71–72); Ontario, Canada
- Education: Queen's University at Kingston; University of Guelph
- Alma mater: University of California, Berkeley
- Scientific career
- Fields: Entomology
- Workplaces: Commonwealth Scientific and Industrial Research Organization

Jane Wright (born 1954 in Ontario, Canada) is an entomologist who discovered the dung beetle Neochara wrightee (named after her) while working for the Entomology division of Commonwealth Scientific and Industrial Research Organization (CSIRO) researching predatory dung beetles in Africa.

Wright earned her Bachelor of Science (Hons) degree from Queen’s University, Canada in 1976. She earned her Masters of Science degree in 1978 from the University of Guelph, Canada while researching the biology of lady beetles. She went on to earn her doctorate in 1984 from the University of California, Berkeley, US while researching the biology of parasitic wasps.

From 1984 to 1998 Wright worked on biological control for CSIRO researching dung breeding flies in South Africa. In 1988 Wright moved to Canberra, Australia continuing her work for the entomology division of CSIRO, in the area of stored products research. From 1997 to 2005 she was the head of CSIRO’s Stored Grain Research Laboratory (SGRL) commercializing fumigant technology and managing operations. Wright retired in 2009 and became an Honorary Fellow at CSIRO working on a project to introduce more dung beetles to Australia.

== Early life and education ==
Jane Wright was born in Ontario in 1954. She attended Queens University in Kingston, Ontario. Her interest in entomology led her to the University of Guelph, Southern Ontario, the only university in Canada with an entomology department. At the University of Guelph, working on her master's degree Wright decided to study apple maggots but professor John Laing persuaded her to study ladybird beetles instead as not as much research had been done on them. Wright did much field work studying ladybird beetles, determining the conditions during the winter that made them most likely to survive. The conditions for research were difficult involving carrying packs of tools, traps and specimens through areas without roads. She dug traps of specimens out of frozen ground to recover them.

After graduating from the University of Guelph, Wright enrolled at Berkeley, California in the United States. Wright studied a parasitic wasp that had been imported to control ice plant scale. She found that wasps chose their host scale insects in which to lay their eggs based on their size. If the host was large, females chose to lay female eggs, but if they were small, they laid male eggs.

== Career ==
Following her PhD, Wright worked with CSIRO-Australia researching dung beetles in Africa. The buffalo fly in both Africa and Australia is a pest to livestock, taking up to 20 blood-meals a day causing bleeding ulcerations. CSIRO-Australia was seeking a parasitic insect that could be imported from Africa to Australia to control the buffalo fly population. Dung beetles feed on the larvae of buffalo flies as they develop in animal dung and had already been identified as a possibility for controlling the buffalo fly’s population when Wright joined the CSIRO-Australia research team in Africa. There are over 250 species of dung beetles that feed on buffalo fly and use their bodies as parasitic hosts; identifying which species would best serve the purpose was the research that Wright continued.

In researching the different beetles that grew in animal dung Wright came across species that had not yet been named. The specialists named this new small African species of beetle Aleochara wrightii after Wright.

The CSIRO-Australia led dung beetle research in Africa went on for almost 20 years and Wright contributed to that research for more than two years. Those funding the research decided to change their priorities and Wright and her group were forced to pack up their research station in Africa. Wright analysed and wrote up her research once back in Brisbane Australia.

Wright then transferred to Canberra, Australia to join the Stored Grain Research Laboratory in Australia as an insect ecologist/behaviourist. One project involved the warehouse beetle and its harmful impact on stored grains and stored grain commodities. The warehouse beetle is not indigenous to Australia and originally an attempt was made to eradicate them. Wright worked with other researchers to find that the warehouse beetle had spread from plants and silos with stored grain into the wild across Australia and that complete eradication was impossible. Wright and her team found the most effective amounts of heat and fumigants used in grain to control the warehouse beetle.

Wright gradually moved into the management stream, becoming deputy head then head of the Stored Grain Research Laboratory, and leading the Stored Products and Structural Pests Section. The final years before retirement were spent as the Operations Manager for the Division of Entomology,

Wright was asked if she saw any discrimination in the workplace as a female scientist. She said that she encountered remarkably little, but during a time that she was applying for work during her final year at Berkeley a person at a conference told her that "a woman who had studied in California would never ever want to go to a remote part of Canada and work on insects in the forest." Wright did not get an interview for the job the man was referring to. A year later at the same conference Wright derived "enormous satisfaction" by telling the same person about the job that she had taken working for CSIRO with dung beetles "in African game parks, and dodging lions and African buffalo."
