= Cyril Wright =

Cyril Wright may refer to:

- Cyril Wright (rugby union) (1887–1960), England rugby union international
- Cyril Wright (sailor) (1885–1960), Gold Medalist at the 1920 Summer Olympics
