= Tim Wright (motorsport) =

British engineer

- Education: Loughborough University
- Occupation: Engineer
- Employer: Aston Martin F1 Team
- Title: Deputy Performance Director

Tim Wright is a British Formula One and motorsports engineer. He is currently the Deputy Performance Director at the Aston Martin F1 Team.

== Career ==
Wright studied Automotive Engineering at Loughborough University, graduating in 2000. He began his career working in simulation and junior single-seater categories, holding roles with Pi Research before moving into Formula 3000 with Team Astromega, where he worked as both a performance and race engineer. He subsequently joined A1 Team Netherlands as a race engineer, gaining further international race-engineering experience. Wright moved into Formula One in 2008 with Toyota Racing F1 as a performance engineer. Following Toyota's withdrawal from the sport, he joined Lotus Racing, continuing in a performance engineering role. He worked as performance engineer to Jarno Trulli in 2011 and to Vitaly Petrov in 2012 as the team rebranded as Caterham F1. From the 2012 Singapore Grand Prix onwards he became Petrov's race engineer for the remainder of the season. Wright subsequently served as race engineer to Charles Pic in 2013 and Marcus Ericsson in 2014.

In 2015 Wright joined the Silverstone-based Force India team as race engineer to Sergio Pérez, guiding the Mexican driver to multiple podium finishes as the team consistently outperformed expectations. He remained in the role through the team's transition to the Racing Point F1 Team following its 2018 administration. In 2020 Wright was appointed Head of Trackside Support, leading remote garage operations and factory-based support during race weekends. Following the team's rebranding as the Aston Martin F1 Team in 2021, he continued in a senior technical capacity and was promoted to Deputy Performance Director in 2023. In this role he oversees trackside support functions alongside a broader remit covering vehicle dynamics, simulation, tyre performance and aerodynamic optimisation.
