= Lee Wright =

Lee Wright may refer to:

- Lee Wright (programmer) (born 1970), British computer and video game programmer
- Lee Wright (field hockey) (1944–2025), Canadian field hockey player
