= Laura Wright (disambiguation) =

Laura Wright (born 1970) is an American actress.

Laura Wright may also refer to:

- Laura Wright (literary scholar), vegan studies theorist
- Laura Wright (author) (born 1970), American author of romance novels
- Laura Wright (cricketer), Australian cricketer
- Laura Wright (singer) (born 1990), English soprano
- Laura Beltz Wright, member of the Alaska Territorial Guard during World War II
- Laura Maria Sheldon Wright (1809–1886), American missionary
- Laura Wright, CFO of Southwest Airlines
- Laura Wright, character from comic book Femforce, secret identity of Nightveil
- Laura Wright (Brookside), a character from British soap Brookside played by Jane Cunliffe
