= Brad Wright (disambiguation) =

Brad Wright (born 1961) is a Canadian television producer.

Brad Wright may also refer to:

- Brad Wright (American football) (born 1959), American football player and coach
- Brad Wright (basketball) (born 1962), American basketball player
