= Ralph Wright (disambiguation) =

Ralph Wright (1908–1983) was an American animator.

Ralph Wright may also refer to:

- Ralph Wright (American football) (1908–1976), American football player
- Ralph Wright (footballer) (1947–2020), English footballer
- Ralph G. Wright (1935–2026), American politician
