= Barbara Wright (author) =

American writer

- Born: November 18, 1951 (age 74) High Point, North Carolina, U.S
- Language: English
- Education: University of North Carolina
- Notable works: Plain Language

Website
- www.barbarawrightbooks.com

Barbara Wright (born November 18, 1951) is an American writer. She is the author of four books: Plain Language, Easy Money, Anny in Love, and Crow. Plain Language received the Spur Award for Best Original Paperback Novel in 2004. Her novel, Crow, a historical fiction novel for children, has received starred reviews from Kirkus Reviews, The Horn Book Magazine, School Library Journal, and Publishers Weekly. Crow was named a Notable Social Studies Trade Book in 2013 by the National Council for the Social Studies.

== Biography ==
Wright was born November 18, 1951, in High Point, North Carolina, where she grew up and attended the University of North Carolina. She currently lives in Denver, Colorado. In addition to being a writer, Wright has worked as a fact-checker and screenwriter. She has traveled around the world and has lived in El Salvador, Korea, and France.

Her career as a writer began while she was living in Korea teaching English at a private language school to Koreans. She wrote articles about Korean culture for a hotel magazine and took over when the current editor left. She states: "I started writing and I never stopped." She is currently working on a book entitled The Scandal Chronicles.
