= Isom Wright =

American politician

Isom Wright (July 1859 – August 17, 1941) was an American politician who served three terms in the Kansas House of Representatives as the Representative from the 79th and 82nd districts in Barton County, Kansas.

Born in Putnam County, Indiana, he lived for 56 years in Barton County and Great Bend, Kansas. Wright, a farmer and teacher, was elected to the Kansas Legislature in 1896 and 1898, and served during the 17-day special session of the Kansas Legislature called by Governor John W. Leedy in December 1898 to address railroad charges. The session lasted from December 21, 1898, to January 9, 1899.

1897–1899 Kansas House of Representatives Committee assignments:

- Claims and Accounts Committee
- Judicial Apportionment Committee
- Engrossed Bills Committee

1899–1901 Kansas House of Representatives Committee assignments:

- Legislative Apportionment Committee
- Penal Institutions Committee
- Cities of the Third Class Committee
