= Andrea Wright =

American professional basketball player

Personal information
- Born: Columbia, South Carolina, U.S.
- Listed height: 5 ft 10 in (1.78 m)

Career information
- High school: Eleanor Roosevelt High School, Greenbelt, Maryland
- College: Penn (2004–2005); Bucknell (2006–2008)
- Position: Small Forward
- Number: 5

Andrea Wright is an American former professional basketball player who last played in Canada's Maritime Women's Basketball Association (MWBA) for the Lake City 56ers. In 2022, she played for the MWBA's Fredericton Freeze, after a short stint in Portugal. Wright played college basketball for the University of Pennsylvania and for Bucknell University. She also competed in NCAA track and field at Bucknell University and the University of New Mexico. She's a part of four championship teams between both sports.

== Personal life and education ==
Wright holds three degrees in three different fields. She earned her Ph.D. in Electrical Engineering from the University of South Florida in 2021, her M.S. in Computer Engineering from the University of New Mexico in 2010, and her B.A. in Computer Science from Bucknell University in 2008.

== Career ==
=== High-school ===
Wright was a 4x varsity basketball player leading Eleanor Roosevelt girls basketball to improving seasons each year. Coach Rod Hairston nicknamed her Future after her freshman year because she "made a positive impact on her team as a freshman" causing him to state "[Wright] was the future of Roosevelt basketball." She scored over 1000 points in her career, averaged a double double, and received many accolades such as McDonald's All-American Nominee (2004), All Met Honorable Mention (2004), and 2004 Gazette All County (Prince George's County).

Wright also competed in Cross Country for 1 season in 2003 having never run before started the season on JV and finished the season as the top runner in Prince George's County. She became the Prince George's County runner of the year, won the Maryland 4A South Region, and finished 9th in the State leading her team to a 2nd place finish at the XC state meet, a feat that had not been accomplished by a Prince George's county cross country team since 1988. Wright finished her high school career with a 3rd place finish in the 4x800 at Nike Outdoor Nationals with an overall time of 9:09.09.

=== College track & field ===
Wright first ran unattached at Bucknell during the 2005-2006 Indoor season. Upon conclusion of the basketball season, Wright began competing in the 800m at Bucknell. By 2008, Wright became one of the top 800m female runners all time at Bucknell and was a part of the ECAC 4 × 800 m relay. The 4 × 800 m team ran 8:59.42 at the Patriot League Championships (finishing 2nd place to Lehigh).

Wright chose to run track in her final year of eligibility becoming a rare 3-time Division I two-sport transfer athlete at that time (2008). She chose to attend the University of New Mexico (UNM) over Pennsylvania State University, University of Maryland, and University of Detroit Mercy. In Wright's first official indoor championship, she ran the 800 three times (prelims, finals, and DMR) and competed in the 4 × 400 m relay. The distance medley relay team placed 2nd in the Mountain West with a time of 12:29.99, and Wright placed 5th in the open 800m. At UNM, Wright ran the 800m and 4x400m with career bests of 2:12.03 and a 55.6 400m split in the 4x4 for her final collegiate race.

=== College basketball ===
Wright began her career at the University of Pennsylvania and competed in the Ivy League (NCAA DI) in 2004. Her best outing as a freshman consisted of 5 points in 10 minutes of play.

In 2005, Wright transferred to Bucknell University but sat out the season due to NCAAA rules requiring Division I players to sit out a season before being eligible to play

From 2006 to 2008 Wright contributed to Bucknell's overall team success, winning the Patriot League regular season championship in 2007 and earning a trip to the WNIT. In 2008, Bucknell won the Patriot League Conference Tournament earning an automatic berth against UNC in the NCAA Women's Basketball tournament.

=== Professional basketball ===
Wright turned pro after securing a try-out for teams in Armenia. After a two-week tryout, Artsakh signed Wright and inserted her into the starting line-up as a Center. She earned multiple player of the week awards while leading the league in Free throw percentage during the regular season. She averaged 15.7 points, 15.1 rebounds, 2.1 assists, and 2.0 steals per game. Her career highs: points-37, rebounds-25 (twice), assists-5, steals-6, and blocks-3. She is part of the inaugural wave of North American-born Import players for the Women's Armenian basketball league.

== Career statistics ==
Legend
GP	Games played	GS	Games started	MPG	Minutes per game	RPG	Rebounds per game
APG	Assists per game	SPG	Steals per game	BPG	Blocks per game	PPG	Points per game
TO	Turnovers per game	FG%	Field-goal percentage	3P%	3-point field-goal percentage	FT%	Free-throw percentage
**Bold**	Career best	°	League leader

=== College ===
Year	Team	GP	GS	MPG	FG%	3P%	FT%	RPG	APG	SPG	BPG	TO	PPG
2004–05	Penn	3	-	4.7	25.0	**33.3**	0.0	1.0	0.0	0.0	0.0	**0.0**	1.7
2005–06	Bucknell	Did not play due to NCAA transfer eligibility rules											
2006–07	Bucknell	**29**	-	9.7	33.8	20.0	77.1	1.5	0.5	0.4	0.0	1.1	2.6
2007–08	Bucknell	26	-	**16.2**	**37.9**	20.0	**78.0**	**2.2**	**0.6**	**0.7**	**0.3**	1.3	**3.8**
**Career**		58	-	12.4	35.6	23.1	77.6	1.8	0.5	0.5	0.1	1.1	3.1
Statistics retrieved from Sports-Reference.
