= Eugene Wright (disambiguation) =

Eugene Wright (1923–2020) was an American jazz bassist.

Eugene Wright may also refer to:

- Eugene Allen Wright (1913–2002), United States federal judge
- Gene Wright (baseball) (1878–1930), American baseball player

== See also ==
- Frederick Eugene Wright (1877–1953), American optician and geophysicist
