= Ernest Hunter Wright =

Ernest Hunter Wright (1882–1968) was a professor at Columbia University, a chairman of English Institute at Columbia (1942–1946), an author of many notable works, an editor-in-chief of Richards Cyclopedia for Juveniles. Wright specialized in the 18th century, Shakespeare and Rousseau.

== Notable works ==
- The Meaning of Rousseau
- The Authorship of Timon of Athens

== Chess ==
According to Jose Capablanca's "A Primer of Chess", Wright was an avid chess player. Capablanca gives Dr Wright credits for the book.

== Personal life ==
Wright was born in Lynchburg, Virginia, in 1882. Wright graduated from Columbia University in 1906 and received his PhD from the university in 1910. Wright died in 1968 and was buried in Fantinekill Cemetery
