= Max Wright (rugby union) =

English rugby union player (born 1997)

Max Wright (born 25 May 1997 (age 29)) is an English rugby union player who plays as centre.

Max Wright was a student at Silcoates School in Wakefield.

Wright joined Bath from Yorkshire Carnegie in October 2017 having scored two tries in twelve appearances for the Yorkshiremen in the 2016-17 season. Wright had to wait a year for his Bath debut after suffering an ankle injury which required three surgeries. He made his debut in September 2018 in the Premiership in a 17-15 victory over Northampton Saints. He joined Newcastle Falcons on short-term loan in late September 2021.

== International career ==
Wright played as England won the Six Nations Under 20s Championship Grand Slam in 2017.
