= Aron Wright =

American physician

President of Miami Valley College
- In office 1870 - 1879

Personal details
- Born: September 30, 1810 Monlallan, Adams County, Pennsylvania
- Died: December 15, 1885 (aged 75) Brooklyn, New York
- Education: Yale Medical School

Aron Wright (September 30, 1810 – December 15, 1885) was an American medical doctor and educator. He was the founder and president of Miami Valley College.

== Life ==
Wright was born in Monallan, Adams County, Pennsylvania, September 30, 1810. His parents moved four years later, to Springboro, Warren County, Ohio, where he grew up.

He began the study of medicine with his sister's husband, John T. Plummer, M. D., of Richmond, Indiana, and later spent two years at Yale Medical School, where he graduated in 1836. After graduation, he practiced for three years in Springboro, but moved to New York City in 1840.

After seventeen years practicing medicine in New York, Wright returned to Springboro with his family. He there engaged in the care of landed property left to him by his father.

In 1870, Wright and other education-minded Quakers founded in the area of Springboro a manual labor school, Miami Valley College. The school was notable for admitting both men and women. Wright served as president for a period of nine years and contributed financially to the college. The college closed in 1883, soon after he left.

In 1880, he moved back to New York, where he lived in Brooklyn. He died there in December 15, 1885.

Wright was a prominent member of the Society of Friends. His daughter Mariana Wright Chapman became noted as a Quaker suffragist.
