= A. R. Wright (folklorist) =

British folklorist (1862–1932)

Arthur Robinson Wright, better known as A. R. Wright (1862–1932) was a British folklorist who was elected President of the Folklore Society, fellow of the Society of Antiquaries and fellow of the Royal Anthropological Institute. He also conducted influential work at the Patent Office.

== Career ==
Wright worked as a civil servant in the British Patent Office. He joined the Patent Office in 1885, rising to the position of Assistant-Comptroller of Patents in 1922 and retiring from the service in 1927. An influential presence in the Office, by 1905 he had carried out a revision of their entire classification scheme and oversaw the indexing of nearly 500,000 patents filed since the 1850s. His work vastly improved the processes of searching for patent specifications.

== Folklore ==
A fellow of the Society of Antiquaries, and of the Royal Anthropological Institute, it was as an active member of the Folklore Society that Wright was most notable. Wright joined the Folklore Society in 1880, becoming a member of its Council from 1898. He was a frequent contributor to the Society’s journal Folk-Lore (which he edited from 1912 until 1931) and was President of the Society from 1927 to 1928.

Wright amassed a large library over around 10,000 books (5,000 of which were on folklore topics). On his death, his library was bequeathed to the Folklore Society.

Wright accumulated a considerable amount of material on British calendar customs (particularly those of England). His uncompleted work on this topic was published after his death in three volumes as British Calendar Customs: England (ed. T. E. Lones).

In a Presidential addresses to the Folklore Society, Wright stressed the need for folklorists to be attuned to contemporary folklore practices and not just to focus on practices that have “survived” from the past. Wright himself, published articles on such contemporary topics as ‘vehicle mascots’ and twentieth century marriage customs.
