= Josh Wright (footballer, born 1988) =

English footballer

Personal information
- Full name: Joshua Harris Wright
- Date of birth: 18 September 1988 (age 38)
- Place of birth: Hartlepool, England
- Height: 5 ft 6 in (1.68 m)
- Position: Midfielder

Youth career
- –: Barnsley

Senior career*
Years	Team	Apps	(Gls)
200?–2007	Darlington	1	(0)
2007–2008	Brodsworth Welfare		
2008	Wakefield	3	(0)
2008–2009	Brodsworth Welfare		
2009	Winterton Rangers		
2009–2010	Emley	21	(5)
2010	Staveley Miners Welfare		
2010–2011	Pontefract Collieries		
2011–201?	Worsbrough Bridge Athletic		
- * Club domestic league appearances and goals

Joshua Harris Wright (born 18 September 1988) is an English former footballer who played as a midfielder in the Football League for Darlington.

Wright was born in Hartlepool in 1988. He joined League Two club Darlington from Barnsley's youth academy, and made his debut on 26 December 2006 as a second-half substitute for a team "crippled by injury and illness" that lost 2–0 at home to Mansfield Town. It was his only first-team appearance before he moved into non-league football, playing for clubs including Brodsworth Welfare (two spells), Wakefield, Winterton Rangers, Emley, Staveley Miners Welfare, Pontefract Collieries and Worsbrough Bridge Athletic, with whom he suffered serious ligament damage.
