= Max Wright (Australian footballer) =

Australian rules footballer (1901–1988)

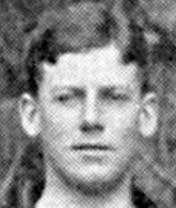

Personal information
- Full name: William Maxwell Wright
- Born: 13 April 1901; St Kilda, Victoria
- Died: 10 February 1988 (aged 86); Fitzroy, Victoria
- Original team: Scotch College
- Height: 179 cm (5 ft 10 in)
- Weight: 80.5 kg (177 lb)

Playing career^{1}
Years	Club	Games (Goals)
1924–25	Melbourne	2 (0)
- ^{1} Playing statistics correct to the end of 1925.

William Maxwell Wright (13 April 1901 – 10 February 1988) was an Australian rules footballer who played with Melbourne in the Victorian Football League (VFL).

Wright later played football with both Camberwell and Brighton in the Victorian Football Association (VFA).
