= Vic Wright =

English footballer

Personal information
- Full name: Ernest Victor Wright
- Date of birth: 24 January 1909
- Place of birth: Bloxwich, England
- Date of death: 4 March 1964 (aged 55)
- Position: Striker

Senior career*
Years	Team	Apps	(Gls)
1926–1929	Bloxwich Strollers		
1929	Bristol City	0	(0)
1929–1930	Rotherham United	40	(20)
1930–1931	Sheffield Wednesday	2	(0)
1931–1934	Rotherham United	48	(18)
1934–1937	Liverpool	81	(31)
1937–1938	Plymouth Argyle	18	(7)
1938–1939	Chelmsford City		
- Millwall (guest)
- Crystal Palace (guest)
- Walsall (guest)
- * Club domestic league appearances and goals

Ernest Victor Wright (24 January 1909 – 4 March 1964) was an English-born footballer who played as an inside forward in the 1920s and 1930s, notably with Rotherham United and Liverpool. He was the son of William Wright and Patience Wootton of Bloxwich, and a first cousin to Aston Villa player Charlie Athersmith.

== Career ==
Wright began his career with hometown club Bloxwich Strollers. In 1929, Wright signed for Bristol City. After a short spell at Bristol City, Wright signed for Rotherham United. In 1930, Wright joined Sheffield Wednesday, where he made two league appearances. A year later, Wright re-signed for Rotherham United, playing for the club for three years. On 14 March 1934, Wright signed for Liverpool. He made his debut against Birmingham on 17 March 1934. His last appearance came on 10 April 1937, and in all he scored 33 times in his 85 games for the club. Following his spell at Liverpool, Wright joined Plymouth Argyle for a transfer fee of £1,000. In 1938, Wright signed for Chelmsford City, playing in Chelmsford's debut season. In World War II, Wright guested for Millwall, Crystal Palace and Walsall.
