= Bricktop Wright =

American baseball and basketball player

- Outfielder
- Born: November 20, 1908; Savannah, Georgia, U.S.
- Died: August 14, 1972 (aged 63); Southampton, New York, U.S.

Negro league baseball debut
- 1943, for the New York Black Yankees

Last appearance
- 1943, for the New York Black Yankees

Career statistics
- Batting average: .176
- Home runs: 0
- Runs batted in: 4

Teams
- New York Black Yankees (1943)

Walter Julian Wright (November 20, 1908 – August 14, 1972), nicknamed "Bricktop", was an American professional basketball player and Negro league outfielder in the 1930s and 1940s.

A native of Savannah, Georgia, Wright attended Textile High School and Lincoln University. He played professional basketball throughout the 1930s and 1940s with such clubs as the New York Rens, Washington Bears, and New York Harlem Yankees, and served in the United States Army Air Corps during World War II.

In 1943, Wright played Negro league baseball for the New York Black Yankees. In 22 recorded games, he posted 12 hits in 78 plate appearances. Wright died in Southampton, New York in 1972 at age 63.
