= Rodney Wright (Australian footballer) =

Australian rules footballer

Personal information
- Full name: Rodney Wright
- Born: 29 December 1960 (age 65)
- Original team: Olympic Youth Club
- Height: 181 cm (5 ft 11 in)
- Weight: 74 kg (163 lb)

Playing career^{1}
Years	Club	Games (Goals)
1980–82	North Melbourne	22 (15)
1983–86	Melbourne	32 (6)
Total		54 (21)
- ^{1} Playing statistics correct to the end of 1986.

Rodney Wright (born 29 December 1960) is a former Australian rules footballer who played with North Melbourne and Melbourne in the Victorian Football League (VFL).
