= Bruce A. Wright =

U.S. Air Force retired general

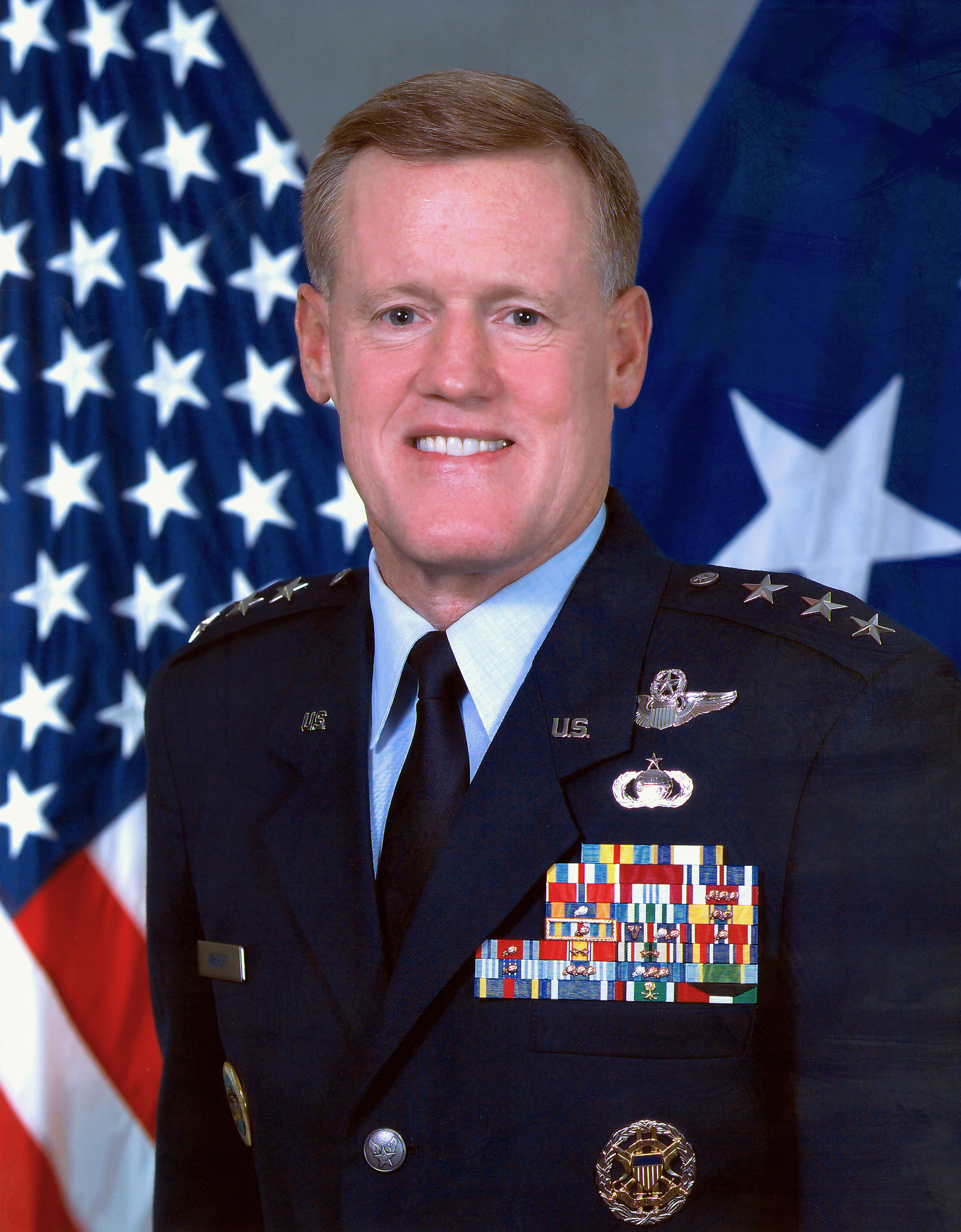
- Official portrait, 2005
- Born: c. 1951 (age 74–75)
- Education: United States Air Force Academy (BS); Golden Gate University (MPA)
- Military career
- Allegiance: United States
- Branch: United States Air Force
- Service years: 1973–2008
- Rank: Lieutenant General
- Nickname: Orville
- Commands: United States Forces Japan; 5th Air Force; Air Intelligence Agency; Joint Information Operations Center; 35th Fighter Wing; 86th Operations Group; 52nd Support Group; 614th Tactical Fighter Squadron
- Awards: Defense Distinguished Service Medal; Air Force Distinguished Service Medal; Defense Superior Service Medal; Legion of Merit

Bruce A. Wright is a retired United States Air Force lieutenant general who served as the president of the Air & Space Forces Association. He last served in active duty as commander of United States Forces Japan and 5th Air Force from February 2005 to April 2008.

After retiring, he worked at Lockheed Martin for nine years.

== Dates of promotion ==
Wright was promoted to the following ranks:

Insignia	Rank	Date of rank
	Second Lieutenant	June 6, 1973
	First Lieutenant	June 6, 1975
	Captain	June 6, 1977
	Major	October 1, 1983
	Lieutenant Colonel	June 1, 1988
	Colonel	December 1, 1992
	Brigadier General	June 1, 1998
	Major General	January 1, 2001
	Lieutenant General	December 10, 2001

Military offices
Preceded by Thomas C. Waskow	Commander of United States Forces Japan and Fifth Air Force; 2005–2008	Succeeded by Edward A. Rice Jr.
Non-profit organization positions
Preceded by Larry O. Spencer	President of the Air Force Association; 2019–2024	Incumbent
