= Geoff Wright =

English footballer

Personal information
- Full name: Geoffrey Derrick Wright
- Date of birth: 1 March 1930
- Place of birth: Countesthorpe, England
- Date of death: 2011 (aged 81)
- Place of death: Leicester, England
- Position: Inside forward

Senior career*
Years	Team	Apps	(Gls)
	Sheffield Wednesday	0	(0)
194?–1951	Aston Villa	0	(0)
1951	Bournemouth & Boscombe Athletic	0	(0)
1951–1952	Rugby Town		
1952–1953	Walsall	16	(1)
1953–1954	Nuneaton Borough	32	(17)
1954–1956	Rugby Town		
1956	Nuneaton Borough	11	(3)
1956–19??	Hinckley Athletic		
- * Club domestic league appearances and goals

Geoffrey Derrick Wright (1 March 1930 – 2011) was an English professional footballer who played as an inside forward in the Football League for Walsall. He was on the books of Sheffield Wednesday, Aston Villa and Bournemouth & Boscombe Athletic without playing league football for any of them, and also appeared for Rugby Town, Nuneaton Borough and Hinckley Athletic.

His father, Steve Wright, played league football for Bolton Wanderers, Norwich City and Brighton & Hove Albion in the 1920s. Wright died in Leicester in 2011, at the age of 81.
