= Rogers H. Wright =

American psychologist (1927–2013)

- Born: Rogers Hornsby Wright; January 27, 1927; Hoxie, Arkansas
- Died: March 31, 2013 (aged 86); San Diego, California
- Education: Northwestern University
- Known for: Professional psychology
- Spouse: Charlotte
- Children: Stacey McDaniels
- Awards: Award for Distinguished Contributions to Applied Psychology as a Professional Practice from the American Psychological Association (1985)
- Scientific career
- Fields: Psychology
- Thesis: The abstract reasoning of deaf college students (1955)

Rogers Hornsby Wright (January 27, 1927 – March 31, 2013) was an American psychologist and writer. He was known as the "Father of Professional Psychology" for his work aimed at improving the recognition of professional psychology as a psychological specialty. He was the co-founder and first president of the Committee for the Advancement of Psychological Professions and Sciences, and he received the American Psychological Association's Award for Distinguished Contributions to Applied Psychology as a Professional Practice in 1985. He served as president of the American Psychological Association's Division 12 (the Society of Clinical Psychology) in 1988.

He was named after professional baseball player Rogers Hornsby.
