= Carol Wright =

Carol Wright or Carroll Wright may refer to:

- Carol Wright (born 1960), English television personality from The Only Way Is Essex
- Carol Lynn Wright (born 1939), birthname of Carol Lynn Pearson, American Mormon writer
- Carroll D. Wright (1840–1909), American statistician and first US Commissioner of Labor
