= Ernie Wright (footballer) =

English footballer (1912–1965)

Personal information
- Full name: Ernest Wright
- Date of birth: 14 November 1912
- Place of birth: Middleton, Lancashire, England
- Date of death: 1965
- Height: 5 ft 8 1/2 in (1.74 m)
- Position: Inside forward

Senior career*
| Years | Team | Apps | (Gls) |
- Sedgley Park
| 1935 | Queens Park Rangers | 1 | (0) |
| 1935–1937 | Crewe Alexandra | 4 | (0) |
| 1937–1938 | Chesterfield | 1 | (0) |
| 1938–1939 | Oldham Athletic | 38 | (5) |
- * Club domestic league appearances and goals

Ernest Wright (14 November 1912 – 1965) was an English footballer who played as an inside forward in the 1930s.

After brief spells in the Football League with Queens Park Rangers (1 game) and Crewe Alexandra (4 games), Wright moved to Chesterfield, and made his debut for them in Division Two on 18 April 1938 against Bradford Park Avenue, although this was to be his only appearance for the club.

Wright then moved to Oldham Athletic making almost 40 league appearances up to World War II.
