= J. J. Wright (DJ) =

American DJ

J.J. Wright is an American disc jockey, originally from Louisville, Kentucky, who has been broadcasting in Boston, Massachusetts since 1973. Starting on WRKO (680-AM), he went to briefly to WBOS (92.9), then KISS 108 when the station first went on the air in 1979, there he stayed for nearly 20 years. After leaving KISS 108 in 1998, he went to WROR (105.7) doing afternoons then shifting to nights in February 2000. He used to broadcast the afternoon drive shift (2 PM- 7 PM) on WODS in Boston before being let go due to the change from oldies to a Top 40 format. He also does imaging for other CBS stations in the Boston market.

== Honors and awards ==
Wright was recognized at the 2000 Achievement in Radio Awards in Boston with the award for Best Evening Show.
