= Dexter Russell Wright =

American politician (1821–1886)

Dexter Russell Wright (June 27, 1821 – July 23, 1886) was an American lawyer and politician.

Wright was born in Windsor, Vermont, on June 27, 1821, the son of Alpheus and Anna E. (Loveland) Wright. During his childhood, his family moved to northern New York State. In 1843, he entered the Junior Class of Wesleyan University, at Middletown, Connecticut, from Heuvelton, New York.

He graduated in 1845 and spent a year teaching in Meriden, Connecticut, before beginning two years of study at the Yale Law School. After earning his law degree in 1848, he opened a legal practice in Meriden. The following year he began his political career with election to the Connecticut State Senate. After serving one term, he traveled to California, where he spent two years practicing law and engaging in land speculation. He later returned to Meriden and continued his legal career until 1862, when he enlisted in the Union Army. He served as colonel of the 15th Regiment State Volunteers from July 1862 until his health declined in February 1863, leading to his honorable discharge.

In 1863, he was elected to the Lower House in the Connecticut Legislature, and from 1863 to 1865, he served as a commissioner on the Board of Enrollment for the 2nd Congressional District. Wright resumed the practice of law in 1864, establishing an office in New Haven. He served as Assistant U.S. District Attorney from 1865 to 1869 and later held several municipal government positions. He was elected to the General Assembly in 1879 and chosen Speaker of the House.

In the spring of 1886, Wright was injured in a fall on the steps of his home, an event that weakened his health. On June 19, he suffered a paralytic stroke, and he died in New Haven on July 23, 1886, at the age of 65.

He married Maria on February 3, 1848. They had four children, including a younger son who graduated from Yale in 1882.

This article incorporates public domain material from the 1887 Yale Obituary Record.
