= A. Gilbert Wright =

American zoologist and museologist

Arthur Gilbert Wright
- Born: 1909; Carthage, Illinois
- Died: 1987 (aged 77–78)
- Scientific career
- Fields: Zoology

Arthur Gilbert Wright (1909-1987) was an American zoologist who was actively involved with the American Alliance of Museums and the American Association for the Advancement of Science.

== Biography ==
=== Early life and education ===
Wright was born in Carthage, Illinois, in 1909. He attended Carthage College, and received a Bachelor's degree in biology in 1932. Later, he attended the University of Illinois and earned a Master's degree in zoology.

=== Career ===
In 1933, Wright became a zoologist at the Illinois State Museum, a position he held until 1953, when he became a curator of exhibits at the Gainesville-based state museum of Florida. He was also an intern for the Rockefeller Foundation at the Buffalo Museum of Science from 1937 to 1938. A decade later, from 1947 to 1948, he worked at the Peabody Museum of Natural History at Yale University as Chief of the School Service Department. He was appointed to the Gateway Arch National Park, then known as the Jefferson National Expansion Memorial, in St. Louis from 1961 until 1963.

After the JNEM project, Wright became an Assistant Chief at the Office of Exhibits Programs on 2 June 1963 at the Smithsonian Institution. Among his duties in this role was making plans regarding exhibits at the National Museum of Natural History, for which he had the title "senior museologist" by 1965, and became an assistant director from 1971 to 1972 and developed the insect zoo. He also taught museology at the George Washington University in Washington, D.C., during the early 70's. After he left the position of assistant director at NMNH, he became a writer and editor for the Office of the Exhibits. He retired in 1975, but continued to direct the Museum Studies Program at GWU until 1978. He died in 1987.

== Bibliography ==
- van Cleave HJ, Wright AG, Nixon CW (July 1947). "Preliminary Observations on Reproduction in the Molluscan Genus Musculium". The Nautilus. 61 (1): 6–11 – via Internet Archive.
- Wright, A. Gilbert (1951). Common Illinois Insects. Story of Illinois series, No. 8. Springfield, Illinois: Illinois State Museum.
- Wright AG, Kalmenoff M (1967). In the steps of the great American herpetologist, Karl Patterson Schmidt. New York: M. Evans. (information from WorldCat, as mentioned in: Sebesta SL, Iverson WJ (1975). Literature for Thursday's Child. Science Research Associates. p. 356. ISBN 0-574-18615-8 – via Internet Archive.)
- Knez EI, Wright AG (1970). "The Museum as a Communications System". Curator. 13 (3): 204–211. doi:10.1111/j.2151-6952.1970.tb00404.x. (citation included in Elliott P, Loomis RJ (1975). Berman A (ed.). Studies of Visitor Behavior in Museums and Exhibitions (Report). Smithsonian Institution. p. 17. ERIC ED134513 – via Internet Archive.)
