= Robert Wright =

Robert, Bob, Rob or Bobby Wright may refer to:

== Law ==
- Sir Robert Wright (judge, died 1689) (c. 1634–1689), Lord Chief Justice of England, 1687–1688
- Robert Wright (South Carolina judge) (1666–1739), Chief Justice of South Carolina from 1725, son of the above
- Robert William Wright (1816–1885), American lawyer, politician, newspaper editor, and author
- Sir Robert Samuel Wright (1839–1904), British judge
- Robert Wright, Baron Wright (1869–1964), British judge

== Sports ==
- Robert Wright (English cricketer) (1852–1891), English first-class cricketer
- Robert Kelsell Wright (1858–1908), English greyhound "slipper"
- Robert Wright (English footballer) (1880–?), English footballer
- Bob Wright (greyhound trainer) (1886–1943), English greyhound trainer
- Bob Wright (baseball) (1891–1993), American baseball pitcher
- Robert Wright (Australian cricketer) (1914–1965), Australian cricketer
- Bob Wright (Scottish footballer) (1915–?), Scottish footballer
- Robert Wright (hurdler), winner of the 60 yards hurdles at the 1943 USA Indoor Track and Field Championships
- Bob Wright (basketball) (1926–2012), American high school and college basketball coach
- Bob Wright (Australian footballer) (1943–2019), Australian rules footballer
- Bobby Jack Wright (born 1950), American football coach
- Robert Wright III (born 2005), American basketball player

== History ==
- Robert Wright (British historian) (1906–1992), Royal Air Force historian and biographer of Hugh Dowding
- Robert K. Wright Jr. (born 1946), American military historian and author
- Robert E. Wright (born 1969), American business, economic, financial, and monetary historian

== Medicine ==
- Sir Robert Wright (surgeon) (1915–1981), British surgeon
- Bobby E. Wright (1934–1982), American clinical psychologist

== Music ==
- Robert Wright (musical writer) (1914–2005), American composer and lyricist of musicals
- Bobby Wright (born 1942), American country music singer
- Rob Wright (musician) (born 1954), Canadian musician

== Politics ==
- Robert Wright (Maryland politician) (1752–1826), United States Senator from Maryland and Governor of Maryland
- Robert R. Wright (1844–1927), mayor of Denver, Colorado
- Robert Wright (New Zealand politician) (1863–1947), MP and mayor of Wellington
- Robert Howard Wright (1865–1933), mayor of Aylmer, Quebec
- Bob Wright (Utah politician) (1935–2012), Utah lawyer, Republican gubernatorial candidate, biographer of David O. McKay
- Robert C. Wright (politician) (1944–2014), Pennsylvania State Representatives and judge

== Religion ==
- Robert Wright (Calvinist priest) (1556–1624), English Anglican priest
- Robert Wright (English bishop) (1560–1643), Bishop of Bristol, 1623–1632, and Bishop of Lichfield, 1632–1643
- Robert Wright (priest, died 1622), Archdeacon of Carlisle
- J. Robert Wright (1936–2022), American theologian and author
- Robert Wright (priest, born 1949), Church of England priest, Archdeacon of Westminster and Chaplain to the Speaker of the House of Commons
- Rob Wright (bishop) (born 1964), American bishop of the Episcopal Diocese of Atlanta

== Others ==
- Robert Wright (courtier) (1553–1596), English scholar and courtier
- Robert Wright (Medal of Honor) (1828–1885), Irish-born American Union Army soldier and Medal of Honor recipient
- Robert Ramsay Wright (1852–1933), Scottish zoologist
- Sir Robert Patrick Wright (1857–1938), Scottish agriculturalist
- Robert Herring Wright (1870–1934), American teacher, president of East Carolina Teachers Training School
- Bob Wright (born 1943), American television businessman and former CEO of NBC
- Sir Robert Wright (RAF officer) (born 1947), British air marshal
- Robert Wright (journalist) (born 1957), American journalist and author of books popularizing evolutionary psychology and game theory
- Rob Wright (writer) (fl. 1998– ), American television producer and writer
- Robert Wright (special effects artist), American special effects artist
- Robert Wright Jr. (fl. 1990s– ), American FBI agent and critic of FBI counterterrorist activities
- Robert G. Wright, Canadian diplomat

== See also ==
- Bert Wright (disambiguation)
