= Courser (disambiguation) =

The courser is a bird in the subfamily Cursoriinae.

Courser may also refer to:

- Courser (horse), a swift and strong horse, frequently used during the Middle Ages for hunting or as a warhorse
- Coursing, the pursuit of game or other animals by dogs
  - Hare coursing
  - Lure coursing, a dog sport
- Al-Adiyat, a surah of the Quran
- Chrysler 26 Courser, an American sailboat design
- Rockwell Courser Commander – Family of twin-engine utility transport aircraft
- Todd Courser (born 1972), American politician
- USS Courser, various ships of the United States Navy
