= Robert Kelsell Wright =

Robert Kelsell Wright (1858–1908) was the third eldest son of Joseph & Ann Wright of Avenue Farm, Waverton, Cheshire, United Kingdom. Robert obtained his middle name from his paternal grandmother Elizabeth Kelsell and did not follow his brothers, Jack Wright, Joseph Wright & Tom Wright into greyhound training. Robert started slipping at coursing events from 1881 at meetings around the country he successfully slipped the Waterloo Cup finals as an approved greyhound slipper in 1890, when he slipped the legendary Fullerton and again in 1895 when his brothers had trained the finalists. Coursing correspondents described the slipping as being performed with great success.

Married in 1903 in Chester he died at Well House Farm, Waverton, Cheshire aged 49 years old. His photograph appears in Blanning & Prescott's: The Waterloo Cup, The First 150 Years.
