= Hardy Wright =

Scottish greyhound trainer

Hardy Wright (1893–1974) was a Scottish greyhound trainer. He was born in Kirkbean, Kirkcudbrightshire, and is the youngest child of Jack Wright and Mary Harriet Palin of Mersehead Farm, Kirkbean (now a RSPB nature reserve). Hardy Wright served with the Royal Navy during World War I, meeting his future wife in Portsmouth during this time.

He came to live at Watchhall, near Annan, Dumfries and Galloway, in the early 1920s, where he set up kennels with his father. Eventually, he took over the running of the kennels from his father. He later moved to Cummertrees House where he established his well-known kennels.

In 1947, he had the runner-up in the Waterloo Cup hare coursing event with Mr. Walter Wilson's Western Water, but his greatest successes came in the mid-1950s. In 1954 and 1955, he won the coveted cup with Mr. Tom Noble's Cotton King and Mr. Truelove's Full Pete respectively.

The following year, he won the Barbican Cup with Mr. Walter Wilson's Well Away - the first time the cup had come to Scotland. He had other successes in the Waterloo Purse and Plate and the Barbican Plate.

He died at his home at Annan, aged 81. His cousin, Harold Wright, trained nine Waterloo Cup winners, an unbeaten performance.
