= Jack Wright (greyhound trainer) =

Jack Wright (born John Wright, 1850–1929) in Waverton, Cheshire, the eldest son of Joseph and Anne Wright of Avenue Farm, previous of The White Horse Inn, Waverton.

Initially employed as a stonemason in a local sandstone quarry he moved to Ditton, Cheshire and started to establish his kennels for training greyhounds for coursing.

By 1891 he moved to Scotland and for many years he acted as dog trainer to Mr Leonard Pilkington of Cavens, Kirkbean (founder of the Pilkington glass firm). He was appointed manager at Mersehead Farm (now an RSPB nature reserve), where he resided for a number of years, his brother Joe Wright, taking over the training of the dogs for Mr. Pilkington.

For a number of years he was trainer for Mr William Paterson. of Broomlands, Maxwelltown and Watchhall, Annan, Dumfries and Galloway, and on the death of Mr Paterson he took over the kennels at Watchhall, and until 1927, when he retired following an illness, he had acted in the capacity of public trainer. Jack Wright had a wide knowledge and experience of dogs, and many animals, mainly greyhounds, were placed in his charge.

On seven occasions he trained winners of the Tenants' Cup at Kinmount coursing, and also the winner of the Corrie Cup during the time of the meetings at Corrie. He had a dog in the last four at Waterloo Cup meetings on three occasions, and while acting as trainer for the late Mr Pilkington he trained "Phoebus," the winner of the £1000 championship at Kempton Park, London. He was a frequent attender at all the principal meetings in the country, where his abilities earned for him many friends by whom he was much respected.

His brothers Joe Wright, and Tom Wright, were well known in sporting circles, and on seven occasions trained winners of the Waterloo Cup.

He died in 1929 aged 79, at Watchhall, Annan, Dumfries and Galloway his youngest son Hardy Wright took over management of the kennels and subsequently won the Waterloo Cup on two occasions.
