= Tom Wright (greyhound trainer) =

Thomas Edward Wright (1861–1956) was an English greyhound trainer. His family was known for its success during the late 19th century. He is the youngest son of Joseph & Anne Wright of Avenue Farm in Waverton, Cheshire. One of seven children, he followed his brothers Jack Wright and Joe Wright into greyhound training.

Initially he trained at Hey House in Saughall, Cheshire for the Fawcett brothers, whom his father had bred and trained for, before moving his training to the Caeau, near Hope, Flintshire. In his later years he lived at Saighton, Cheshire. Training greyhounds for coursing Tom Wright employed many different methods to ensure his dogs successes; hanging pig carcasses from a tree encouraging the dogs to jump to strengthen their hind legs and teaching them to jump drainage ditches that they may encounter during the coursing.

1895 saw the dominance of the Wright family in the Waterloo Cup competition, Joe trained the winner Thoughtless Beauty, Tom trained the runner up Fortuna Favente and another brother Robert Kelsell Wright slipped the dogs in the final.

In the White Lion public house in Brampton, Cumberland he purchased the greyhound bitch Fair Future for £5 from the landlord. The bitches litters yielded amongst the first Waterloo Cup winning greyhound for the Fawcett brothers and Tom Wright.

The following is a list of the Waterloo Cup winning greyhounds that he trained:

- 1896 Fabulous Fortune
- 1900 Fearless Footsteps
- 1901 Fearless Footsteps
- 1902 Farndon Ferry
- 1903 Father Flint

Acknowledged by Charles Blanning and Sir Mark Prescott as one of the great trainers of all time, he died at his daughter's house in Whitford, Flintshire, in 1956.

His son Ralph was the manager at Hove greyhound stadium, and his son John also trained greyhounds, winning the Waterloo Cup 4 times.
