= Jon Wright (disambiguation) =

Jon Wright (fl. 2009–2014) is a Northern Irish film director.

Jon Wright may also refer to:

- Jon Wright (footballer) (1925–2015), English footballer
- Jon Wright (snooker player) (born 1962), English snooker player

== See also ==
- Joe Wright (disambiguation)
- John Wright (disambiguation)
- Jon Richt (born 1990), American football coach
