= William Robert Wright =

William Robert Wright may refer to:

- Bob Wright (Utah politician) (1935–2012), American political candidate and author
- Will Wright (footballer, born 1997), English footballer

== See also ==
- Robert Wright (disambiguation)
- Robert William Wright (1816–1885), American journalist
- William Wright (disambiguation)
