= Sir St George Gore, 8th Baronet =

Irish baronet and outdoorsman

Sir St George Gore 8th Baronet of Magherabegg
- Born: 28 April 1811; Dublin, Ireland
- Died: 31 December 1878 (aged 67); Inverness, Scotland

Sir St George Gore, 8th Baronet (28 April 1811 – 31 December 1878) was an Anglo-Irish baronet and outdoorsman, notable for his hunting expedition through the American west in the 1850s.

== Biography ==
=== Early life ===
Gore was born on 28 April 1811 to Grace and Sir Ralph Gore in Dublin, Ireland. His father was the 7th Baronet of Magherabegg, a title Gore inherited after the former's death in 1842. He was an only child.

Gore briefly studied as an undergraduate at Oriel College in the University of Oxford, before dropping out in 1834 without earning a degree.

=== Endeavors in the British Isles: 1842–1852 ===
Gore hunted extensively in Scotland beginning in the 1840s, when he introduced punt shooting into the Scottish Highlands, a technique which was reportedly unheard of in the region prior to Gore. He was also credited as being the first to use "a particular kind of Irish fishingrod [sic]" on the Loch Ness, which went on to become the preferred implement in the area.

During this time, Gore became notorious for his hunting feats, which often totaled hundreds or thousands of animals each season. In 1846, the Inverness Courier stated that Gore killed as many as 153 brace (pairs) of grouse in the span of two days in August, alongside 16 hares, two snipes, and a woodcock.

Gore also participated in competitive coursing in England beginning in 1847. He won the Waterloo Cup in 1848 and 1849 with his hounds "Shade" and "Magician", respectively. He also saw success in other competitions around this time, including at the Craven Puppy Stakes event, the Ashdown Park Coursing Competition, and the Chippenham Stakes for Puppies at the Newmarket Champion Coursing Meeting.

Gore's agent, Charles Trench Cage, was murdered in 1849 after attempting to evict tenants from Gore's lands in Ireland. This occurred in conjunction with the Great Famine, which was occurring throughout the island at the time in part as a result of the rent policies of absentee landlords like Gore.

=== First American expedition: 1853–1858 ===
Gore set sail for Canada from Liverpool in June 1853. He passed through Quebec and arrived in Montreal, and proceeded to hunt and fish in the Great Lakes region for several months before arriving in St. Louis in December. Gore then stayed in St. Louis until the spring of 1854, when he departed for the modern-day Westport area of Kansas City.

After his brief stay in Westport, Gore left for the Colorado Territory, with the intent of hunting big game. Gore's accompanying party was described as large and extravagant; a contributor to the Ohio State Journal stated that Gore had with him between 40 and 50 greyhounds and staghounds, a large carriage, and a dozen wagons with five yoke of oxen each. Henry S. Bostwick, a man who was present for part of the expedition, estimated that Gore had about 40 men with him when he left for Colorado. Also present in the group was mountain man Jim Bridger, who acted as the party's chief guide for much of their time in the Territory.

While in Colorado, the party cut a pass through the modern-day Gore Range in order to hunt on the other side of the mountains. Originally a footpath, this pass was later named "Gore Pass". It is currently traversed by State Highway 134.

The party reached Fort Laramie in late 1854. After spending the winter there, they resupplied and departed in the spring, traveling along the west side of the Pumpkin Buttes, then along the Powder and Yellowstone rivers. Gore was described as having killed a large amount of buffalo in the fall of 1855, with reports ranging up to 2,500 animals killed.

The group wintered in a self-constructed fort from 1855-56. The party then traveled along the Tongue River in the spring of 1856, with the intent of trading with a local Crow camp. They successfully located the camp shortly after, traded for new horses, and headed towards the Black Hills, where they hunted for some time before going north to Fort Union. After coming into conflict with the fort's manager, Major Alexander Culbertson, and unsuccessfully bargaining for the construction of two ferries to take him down the nearby Missouri River to St. Louis, Gore reportedly burned a large portion of his supplies outside the fort and departed with his entourage.

Gore spent the winter of 1856-57 with the Hidatsa, where the tribe's Chief Crow's Breast gave up his earth lodge dwelling so Gore could stay. When the river thawed, Gore left on a steamer from Fort Berthold and arrived back in St. Louis in early June.

Gore remained in Missouri until April 1858, when he hunted waterfowl in the eastern part of the state before heading to Canada. He departed Quebec for England later that year.

=== Second American expedition and death: 1873–1878 ===
Gore later returned to North America on a second hunting trip in 1873, when he arrived in Quebec in June. He stayed in Canada until November, when he left to hunt in Florida. Gore then traveled across the coastal south of the United States, occasionally returning to Canada. He returned to England in February 1876.

Gore died on 31 December 1878 at the age of 67, in Inverness, Scotland, from complications involving congestion of the lung, a weak heart, and an enlarged liver. He was unmarried and had no children. His title passed on to Sir St George Ralph Gore, his first cousin once removed.

== Legacy ==
Several geographic landmarks in the areas Gore traveled to during his expedition have been named after him, most notably the Gore Range in Colorado and its corresponding mountain pass, Gore Pass. Other landmarks named after Gore include Gore Creek, Gore Canyon, and Gore Lake.

A commemorative bronze placard was erected in the pass by the State Historical Society of Colorado.

A restaurant in Vail, Colorado, was formerly named the "Lord Gore Club".
