= Robert Rich, 2nd Baron Rich =

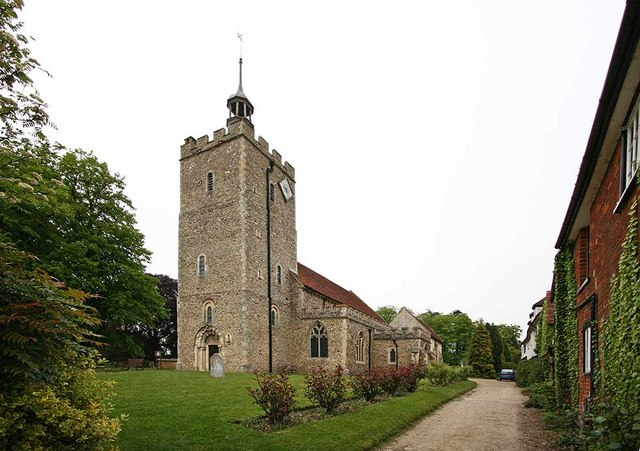
Holy Cross, Felsted, Essex

Robert Rich, 2nd Baron Rich (c.1537–1581) was an English nobleman.

He was the eldest son of Richard Rich, 1st Baron Rich by his wife Elizabeth, daughter and heiress of William Jenks of London.

He married around 1555 Elizabeth, daughter and heiress of George Baldrey (d. 1540) and granddaughter of Sir Thomas Baldry, Lord Mayor of London in 1514. Their children were:

- Richard married Katherine Knyvet. He died before his father.
- Robert, 3rd Baron Rich (later Earl of Warwick)
- Edwin married Margaret, daughter of Charles Wolriche of Suffolk
- Elizabeth

His father was reprimanded by the privy council in 1562 for seeking to have Rich elected as knight of the shire in preference to William Petre. This may have been due to suspicions of Petre's religious views, as Rich was a strong Protestant who later had the Calvinist Robert Wright as his domestic chaplain.

In 1578 a dispute between Rich and one Edward Windham led to skirmishes in Fleet Street between their servants, which resulted in Windham's imprisonment. Following his death his property in London and Essex was valued at £1,857.

He is presumably the kneeling figure represented on the monument to his father in Felsted church.

Peerage of England
Preceded by Richard Rich	Baron Rich; 1567-1581	Succeeded by Robert Rich
