= Waverton, Cheshire =

Village in Cheshire, England

Coordinates: 53.173°N 2.814°W

Waverton
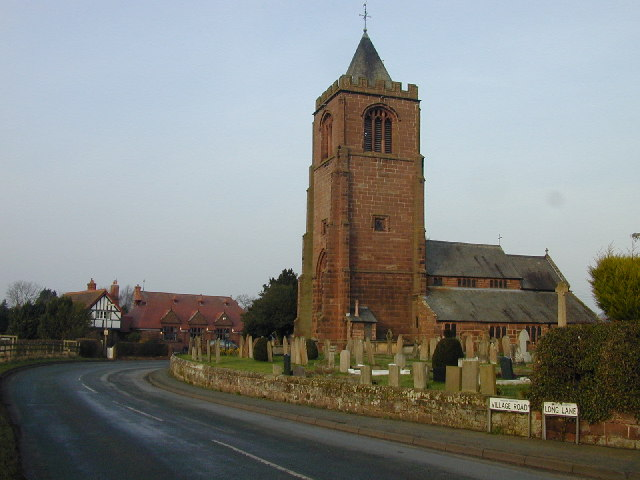
- St Peter's Church

- Location within Cheshire
- Population: 1,560 (2001)
- OS grid reference: SJ456643
- Civil parish: Waverton
- Unitary authority: Cheshire West and Chester
- Ceremonial county: Cheshire
- Region: North West
- Country: England
- Sovereign state: United Kingdom
- Post town: CHESTER
- Postcode district: CH3
- Dialling code: 01244
- Police: Cheshire
- Fire: Cheshire
- Ambulance: North West
- UK Parliament: Chester South and Eddisbury

Waverton is a village and civil parish on the outskirts of Chester in the unitary authority of Cheshire West and Chester and the ceremonial county of Cheshire, England. It lies about 3 miles (4.8 km) south-east of Chester High Cross, 19 miles (31 km) south of Liverpool and 33 miles (53 km) south west of Manchester. It is almost continuous with the village of Rowton to the north west and that in turn is almost continuous with Christleton. According to the 2011 Census, the population of the parish was 1,587.

The village's Anglican church is dedicated to St. Peter. The village has an Evangelical church and there is a Methodist church on the edge of the village in the parish of Rowton. The village has a post office, a number of shops, a takeaway, hairdressers, a primary school and a pub called the Black Dog. The village is home to the outdoor children's adventure attraction, the Crocky Trail. The Waverton Good Read Award was founded in 2003 for first-time UK novelists. Waverton Business Park is also located in the village, off the A41.

The Shropshire Union Canal (originally Chester Canal) runs through the middle of Waverton. The village had two railway stations, Black Dog from 1840 to 1898 and Waverton from 1898 to 1959 which offered services on both the North Wales Coast Line and Whitchurch and Tattenhall Railway. The North Wales Coast Line continues to run past the village between Chester, Crewe and North Wales, While the Tattenhall and Whitchurch Railway was closed in the 1960s. Waverton railway station is now a bus depot run by Stagecoach Merseyside & South Lancashire, while the site of Black Dog railway station is in use for the North Wales Coast Line with nothing remaining of the station site.

The village also has a large junior football team, AFC Waverton, which competes in both the Chester and District Junior Football League and the Ellesmere Port Junior Football League.

== History ==
The settlement was named Wavretone in the Domesday Book, where it was said to be in the Dudestan Hundred. The name was first given as Waverton in 1260, having been called Waueretone in 1150, and Wauertone in 1100. The origin of the name is not certain. The Church of St Peter's nave has a roof that has been dated to 1665. The tower, on the west end of the building, is built in the Perpendicular Style and possess a nineteenth-century pyramidal roof. Although the church was restored in the 1880s, the chancel's timber framing, the windows, and clerestory are all original. New residential developments led to a significant expansion of the village in the 20th Century. Until the late 1970s there was a chemical works located on the canal in the centre of Waverton. Residents of the village tend to be commuters to Liverpool and Manchester with easy access to the M53 motorway and M56 motorway, as well as into Chester city centre.

== Notable people ==
- Joseph Wright (ca.1824-1908), local greyhound trainer, he farmed at Avenue Farm, previously being the innkeeper of The White Horse public house in the village.
- Jack Wright (1850–1929), local greyhound trainer
- Joe Wright (1855-1923), local greyhound trainer
- Robert Kelsell Wright (1858–1908), slipped the Waterloo Cup finals in 1890 & 1895, he farmed at Well House Farm.
- Tom Wright (1861–1956), local greyhound trainer

== See also ==
- Listed buildings in Waverton, Cheshire
- Waverton school and schoolmaster's house
