= Shortflatt Tower =

Grade I listed pele tower in Northumberland

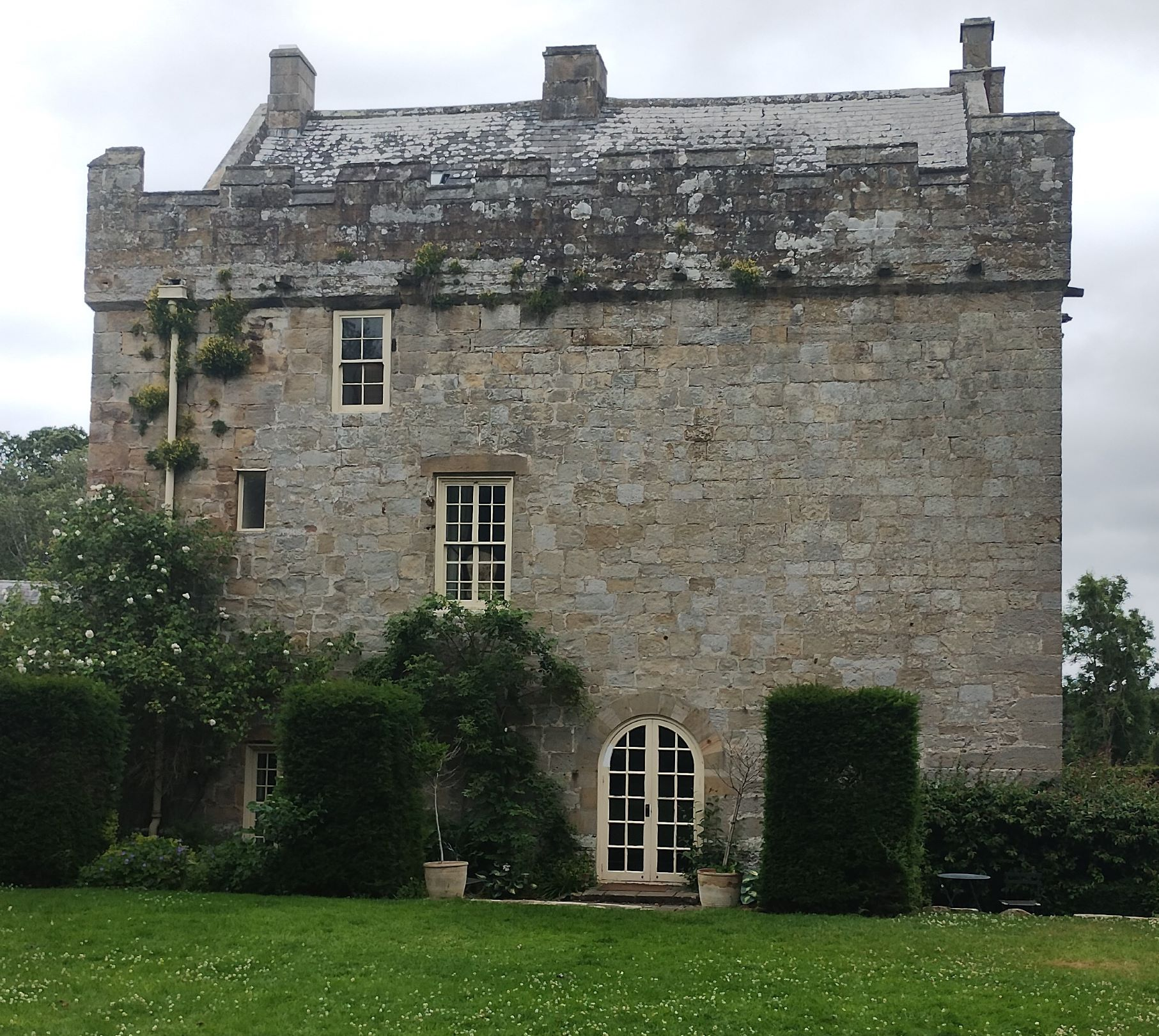
- Shortflatt Tower, looking eastwards

- Shown in Northumberland
- 55.123276°N 1.877084°W
- Location: Bolam

History
- Built: late 15th-century to early 16th-century

Site notes
- Area: Belsay
- Architectural style: Tudor style

Listed Building – Grade I
- Official name: Shortflatt Tower
- Designated: 27 August 1952
- Reference no.: 1042821

Shortflatt Tower is a Grade I listed building in the parish of Belsay, Northumberland, England. Built as a pele tower, it is believed to date from the late 15th-century to early 16th-century. In addition to the three storey tower, attached to it is a two storey 17th century manor house, with two additional wings, running parallel to each other, known as the annex. The listing covers the tower and the manor house.

The location has a longer history, since a letter patent, dated 1305, provided a licence to crenellate (to build a fortified building) at Shortflatt. English Heritage, in the official listing indicates that the current buildings date to no earlier than the late 15th-century. A previous analysis by the architect H. L. Honeyman for the Society of Antiquaries of Newcastle upon Tyne in 1954 suggested the tower dated to the early 14th-century, in line with the licence. Honeyman suggested that there was a previous mainly timber building before this, but which may have been a casualty of the Scottish army raids into Northumberland during 1296, a prelude to the English invasion of Scotland.

== Tower ==
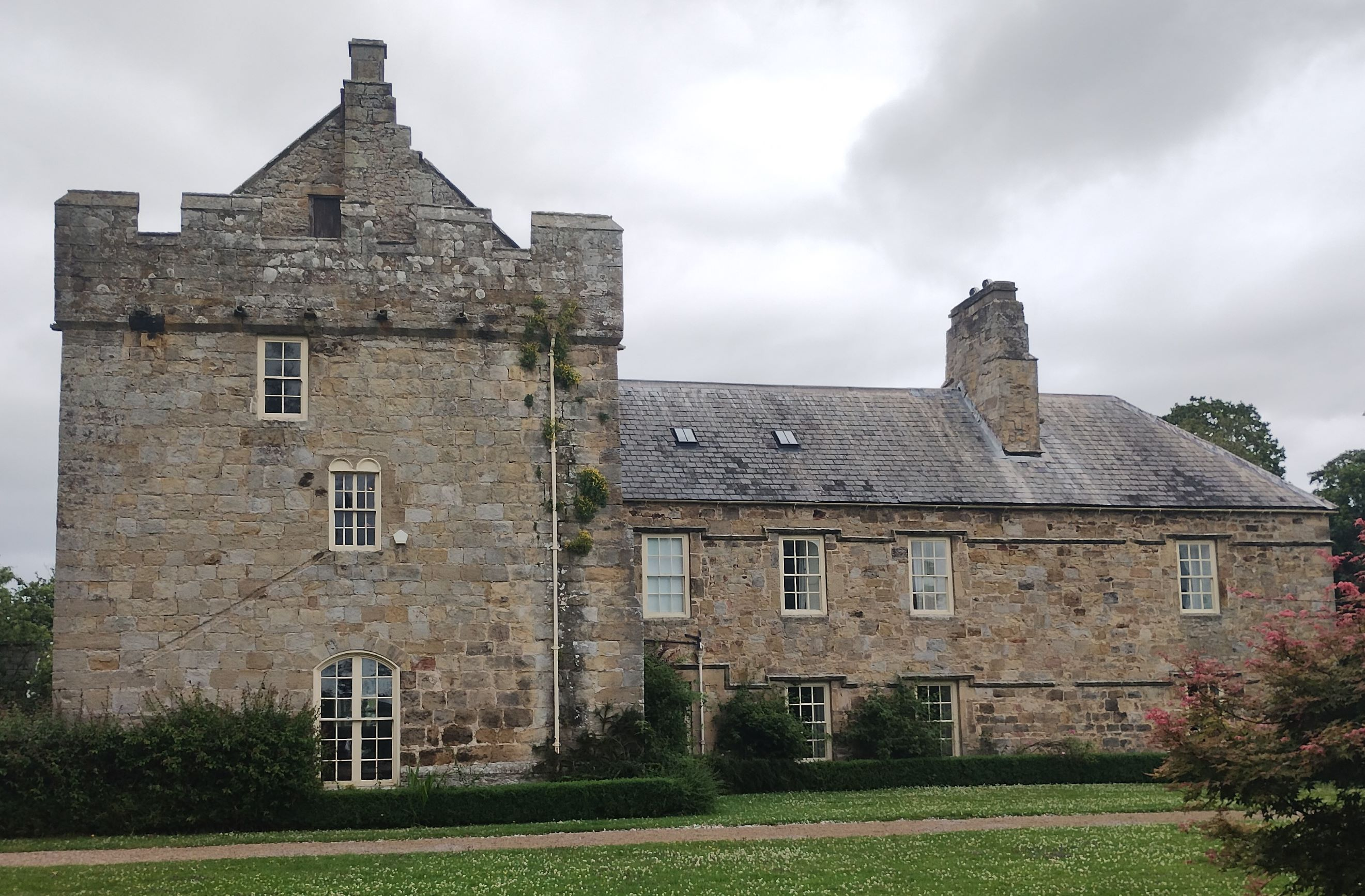
Shortflatt Tower (left) and manor house, looking northwards

Shortflatt Tower is at the west end of the current set of buildings. It has three storeys, with ground floor measurements of 34 feet (10 m) by 19.5 feet (5.9 m). The walls of the tower are over 6 feet (1.8 m) thick. The tower is on a slope, made of squared stone, and with a steeply gabled stone slate roof. The tower has battlements along the top parapet. The sides have 19th-century sash windows, and another window which was originally a door from the Tudor period.

Unlike some other pele towers in the vicinity, such as Elsdon Tower, the location is not in a defensive location, it is in open countryside.

== Manor house and annex ==
To the east of the tower is the central manor house block, believed to have been built in the early 16th-century over the ruins of a former building. It is approximately 60 feet (18 m) long and now has two storeys, but it was originally built as three storeys. The front has for bays for 18th-century sash windows on both floors, with a large ridge stack between the third and fourth bays. This acts as a stepped chimney-breast. The manor house entrance door is 16th or 17th-century.

The parallel north wing sections, known as the annex, were the last part of the building to be constructed, being a mix of construction periods from the 17th to 20th-century. The wing is some 45 feet (14 m) long. Both the manor house and annex have Welsh slate roofs.

== Usage ==
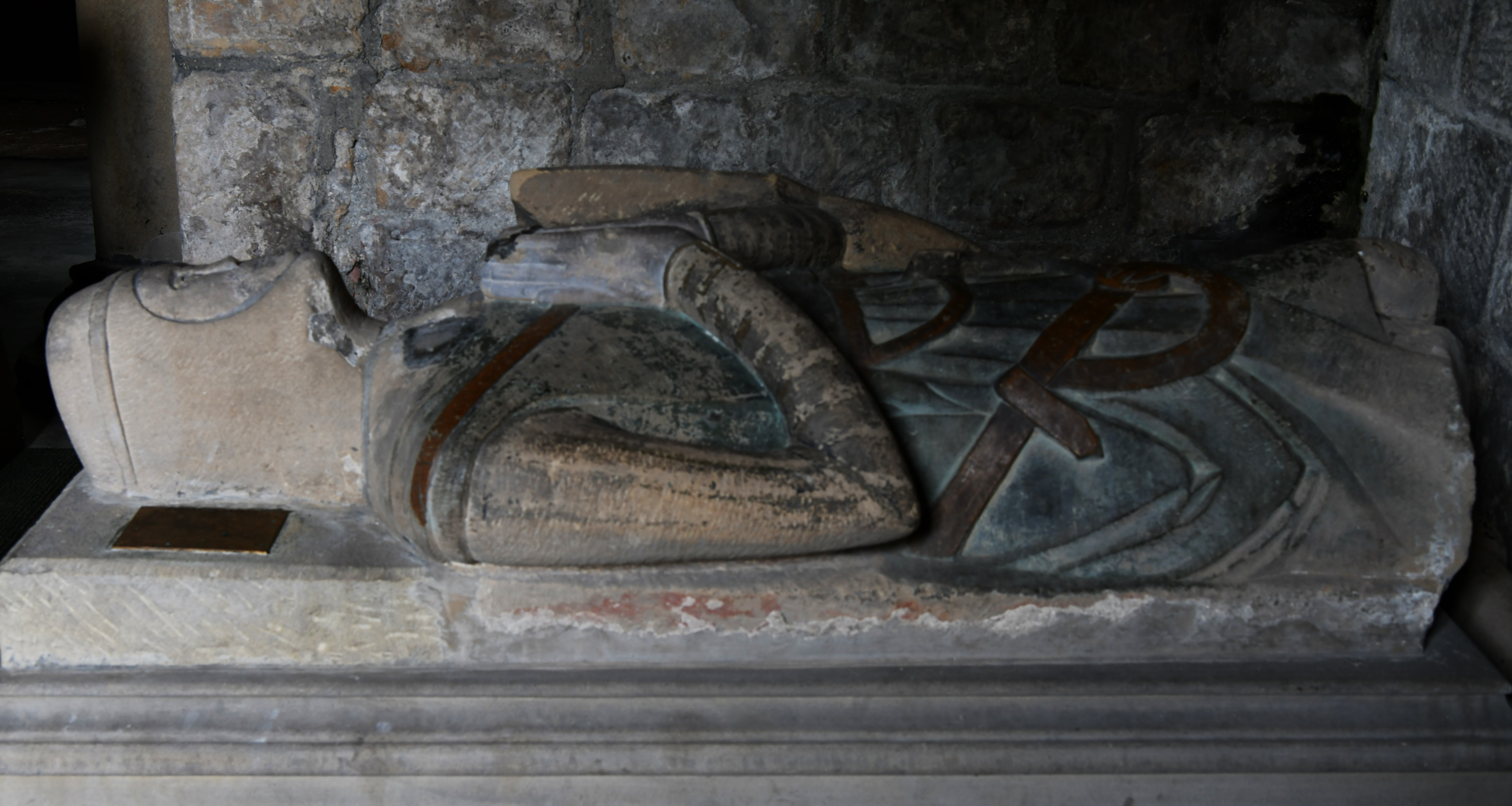
St. Andrew's Church, Bolam: Effigy of Robert de Reymes d. 1323

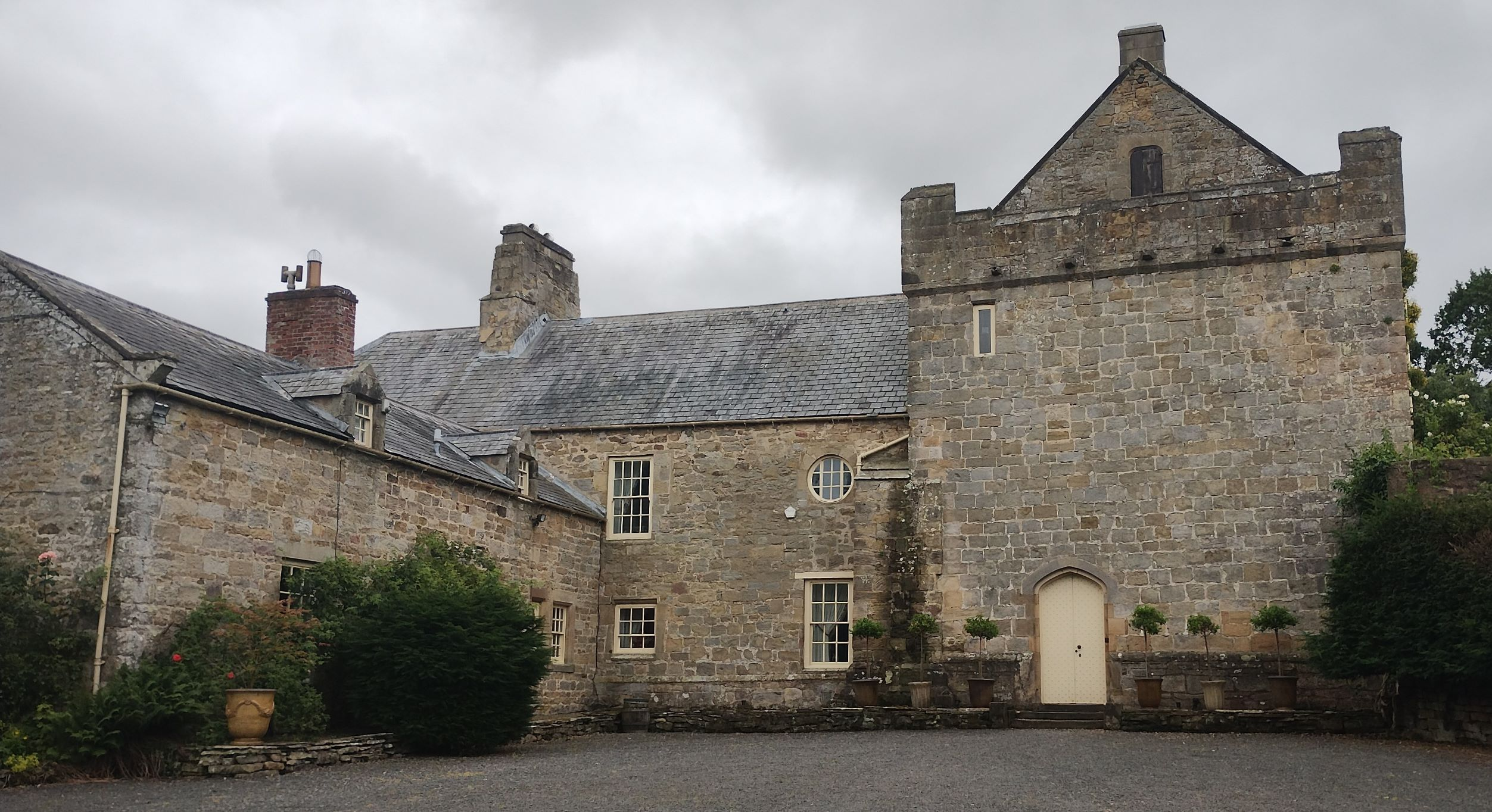
Shortflatt Tower (right), annex wing (left) and connecting manor house.

Shortflatt Tower was originally built as a property capable of being defended, and as a family homestead, in the context of the long-running reiver raids that affected Northumberland until 1603. Robert de Reymes of Shortflatt was the owner at the time of the 1305 crenellation licence. He was a landowner with property in Suffolk and Aydon, the latter was also allowed to be crenellated in 1305. He died in 1323, and was buried in St Andrew's Church in Bolam. The Reymes family continued to own Shortflatt until 1604, when Henry Reymes started to sell off his inherited estates to William Selby. Henry Reymes' father, John, was the last Reymes to be known as "of Shortflatt", and from 1607 the new owner adopted the name of William Selby of Shortflatt. During the Reymes' period of ownership the reiver incursions badly damaged Shortflatt's economic viability due to the lack of tenants and the inability to safely farm the estate in the face of repeated raids launched from Scotland.

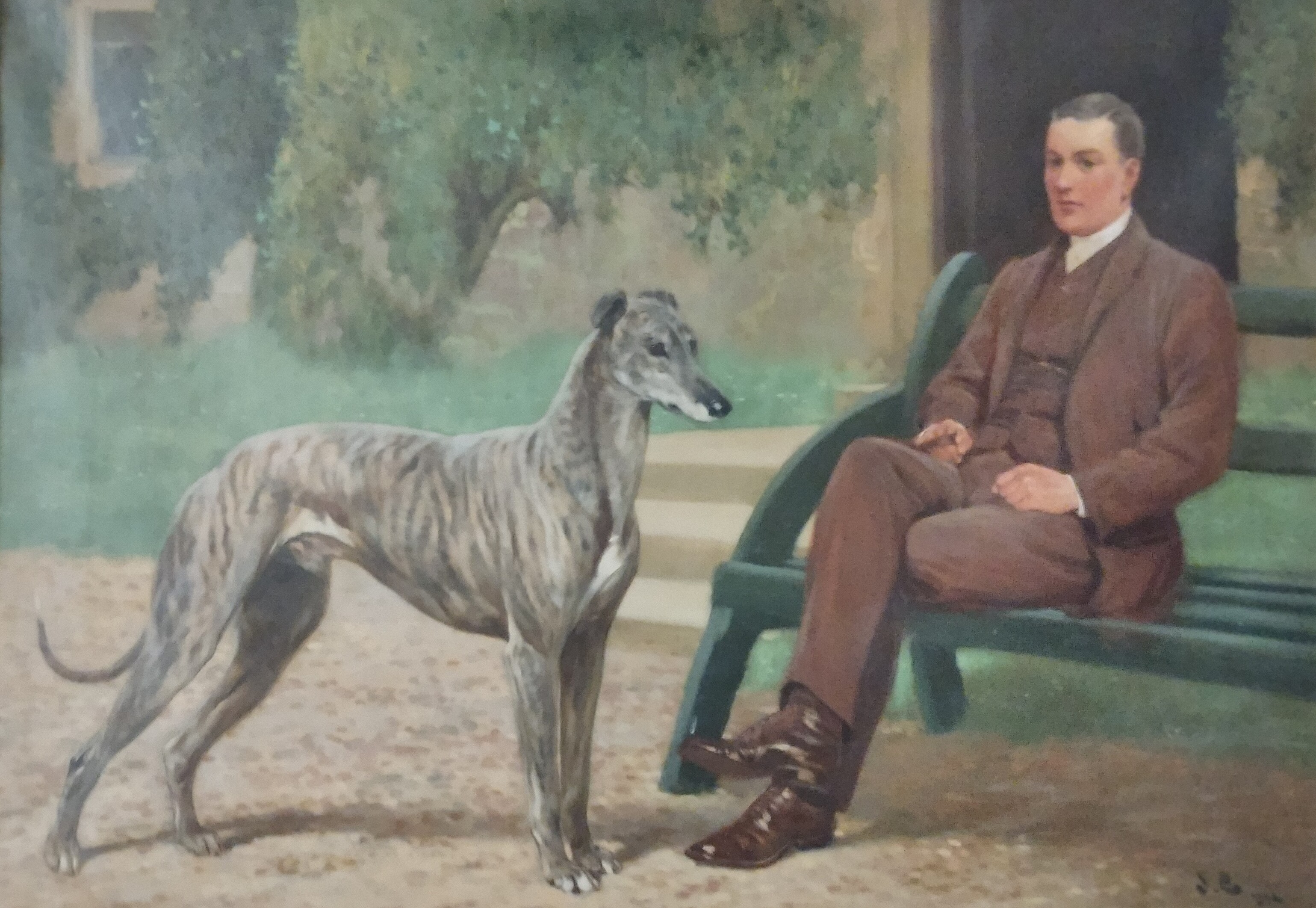
Fullerton with trainer Edward Dent at Shortflatt, painting by John Charlton.

William Selby, who was knighted in 1613 and was a Roman Catholic recusant, took over the property after the reiver raids had stopped and he is believed to have constructed the central manor house block. The property went through several other owners until 1750 when John Dent bought Shortflatt for £5,500, equivalent to £1.1 million as of May 2026. One member of this family, Edward Dent (1855–1926) was to become a successful greyhound breeder and trainer. This included Fullerton, the first and last greyhound to win the Waterloo Cup four times. Fullerton was born at Shortflatt and retired there after his racing career ended in 1893.

From 1926 the family became known as Hedley-Dent and continued to own the property until 2017.

The estate's buildings are now used as a commercial venue for weddings and corporate events.
