= Joseph Wright =

Joseph Wright may refer to:

- Joseph Wright of Derby (1734–1797), English painter
- Joseph Wright (American painter) (1756–1793), American portraitist
- Joseph A. Wright (1810–1867), governor of Indiana
- Joseph Wright (architect) (1818–1885), English architect
- Joseph Wright (greyhound trainer) (1824–1908)
- Joseph Farrall Wright (1827–1883), Anglican priest and founder of English football club Bolton Wanderers
- Joseph Wright (linguist) (1855–1930), English philologist
- Joseph Wright (rower) (1864–1950), Canadian rower
- Joseph C. Wright (1892–1985), American art director
- Joseph Wright Jr. (rower) (1906–1981), Canadian rower
- Joseph Wright (illustrator) (1947–2017), English illustrator and cartoonist
- Joseph Wright (Mississippi politician) (1952–2022), American politician

== See also ==
- Joe Wright (disambiguation), common diminutive of Joseph
- Joey Wright (born 1968), American basketball coach
