= John Wright (greyhound trainer) =

John Wright (1899–1980) was born in Little Saughall, Cheshire, the son of Tom Wright and Lizzie Davies. Following on from his fathers success as a trainer of greyhounds, John Wright initially trained for the racehorse breeder Mrs Clarissa Sofer Whitburn at Amport House, Andover, Hampshire. He acknowledged that his favourite dog that he had trained, of all time, was his first winner Mrs Sofer Whitburn's White Collar. In his capacity as a public trainer Wright moved his kennels to his father's house, The Caeau, Hope, Flintshire, before finally establishing his last kennels at Springfield, Holt, Flintshire. Of all the members of the Wright Family of greyhound trainers, John Wright can be considered one of the most successful with a training career of Waterloo Cup winners spanning 32 years.

The following is a list of the Waterloo Cup winning greyhounds that he trained:

- 1928 White Collar
- 1943 Countryman
- 1947 Constable
- 1960 Jonquil
