= Fullerton (greyhound) =

Champion greyhound (1887–1899)

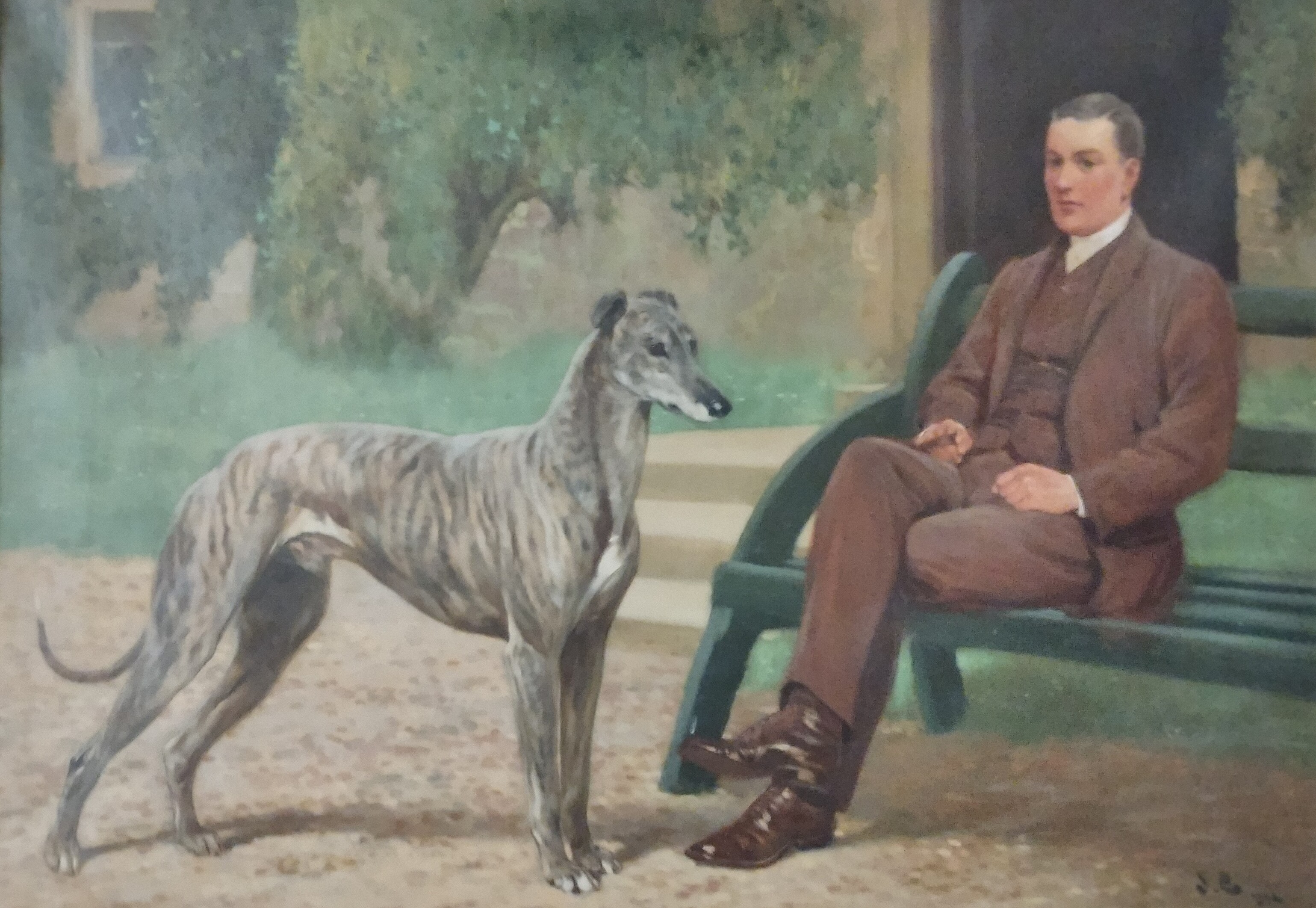
- Fullerton with trainer Edward Dent.
- Breed: Greyhound
- Discipline: Hare coursing
- Sire: Greentick
- Grandsire: Bedfellow
- Dam: Bit of Fashion
- Maternal grandsire: Paris
- Sex: Dog
- Whelped: 17 April 1887
- Died: 5 June 1899 (aged 12)
- Country: Great Britain
- Color: Brindle
- Breeder: Edward Dent
- Owner: Col. John T. North / Edward Dent
- Trainer: Edward Dent

Major wins
- Waterloo Cup 1889 (divided); Waterloo Cup 1890; Waterloo 1891; Waterloo Cup 1892

Honours
- Waterloo Cup all-time champion
- Last updated on: July 2026.

Fullerton (17 April 1887 - 5 June 1899) was a greyhound trained in the sport of hare coursing. He won the Waterloo Cup four years in succession, starting in 1889, the only greyhound to achieve this feat. His breeder and trainer was Edward (Neddy) Dent of Shortflatt Tower in Northumberland. Fullerton was owned by Colonel John T. North for his coursing career.

== Early life ==
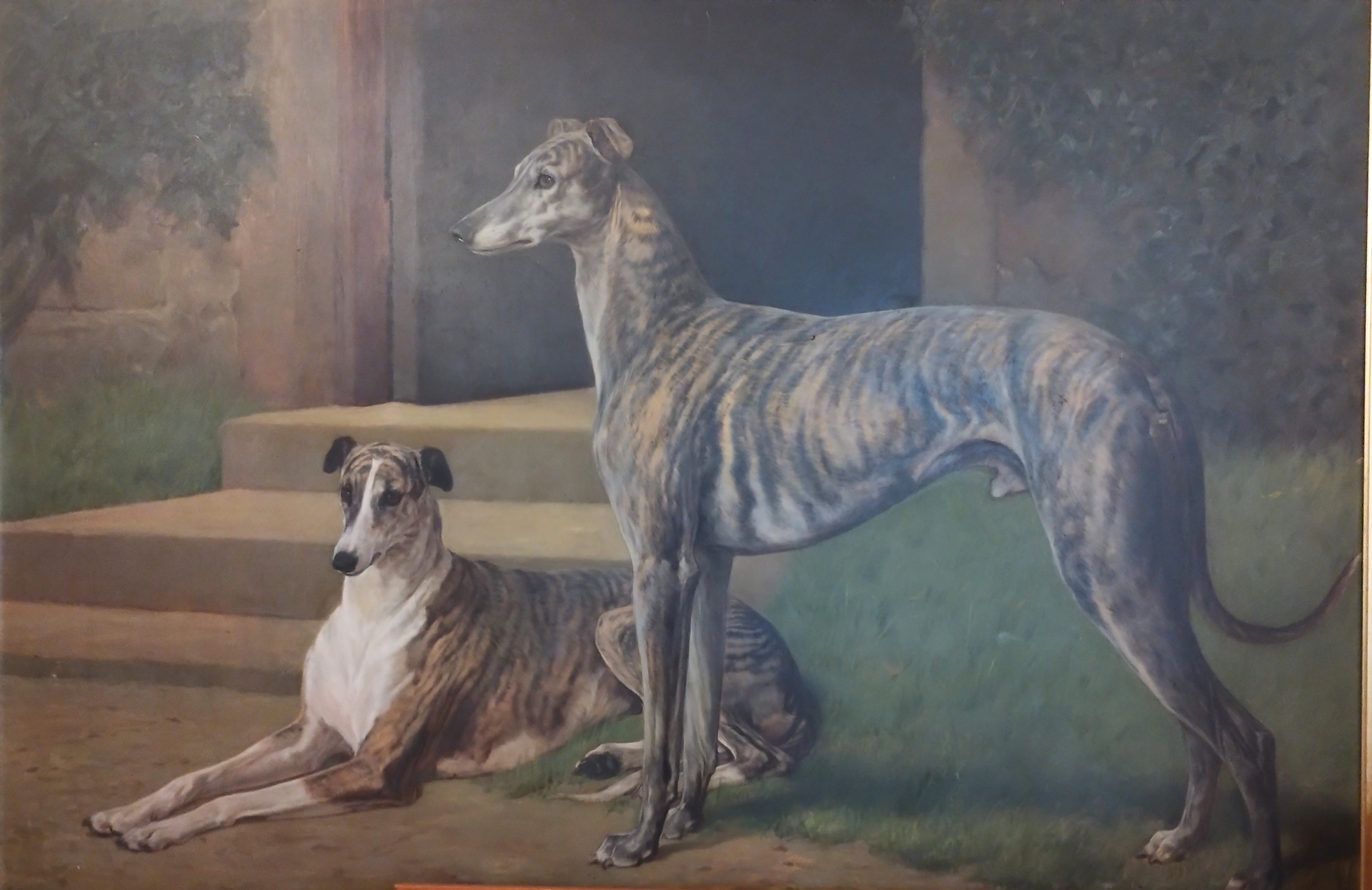
Painting by John Charlton of Fullerton (standing) and Bit of Fashion at Shortflatt Tower, Northumberland.

Fullerton was born in a litter of ten puppies, on 17 April 1887, at Shortflatt Tower, the home of Edward Dent. His mother (dam) was Bit of Fashion, his father (sire) was Greentick. Fullerton was brindle in markings, and went on to weigh 65 pounds (29 kg), relatively heavy compared to other sporting greyhounds of that era. He was initially raised by Mary Mole at Lanehead, Tarset before he was returned to Shortflatt for training.

Dent sold Fullerton in December 1888 to North, who was known as the Nitrate King from his international fertiliser investments. The auction price was 850 guineas, which as of May 2026 is equivalent to £102,000 and was at the time considered an astronomical sum for a dog. However Fullerton's winnings were to greatly exceed this sum. Fullerton was brought down from Northumberland to London by train for the auction at the Royal Repository, Barbican, London, however after the sale to North, and with North's permission, Fullerton was returned to Shortflatt Tower with Dent, to complete his training.

== Early trials in 1888 ==
Before Fullerton's Waterloo Cup début, he had events at Haydock Park, Kempton Park, and Gosforth Park. At Haydock Park in September 1888, Fullerton lost against Greengage in his first public competition, the Haydock Derby for puppies. Greengage had a bye in the previous course, and Fullerton had a lame foot by the time they met in the deciding course. The correspondent for The Sporting Chronicle noted that Dent believed strongly in Fullerton's potential, and went on to report: "Although defeated, I am not at all certain that Fullerton met a better greyhound than himself in Greengage."

At Kempton Park in January 1889 Fullerton twice lost trial spins against the veteran Miss Glendyne, his aunt with 4 years seniority on the puppy, which was seen as an unsatisfactory outcome. But Fullerton was the clear winner, six lengths, against Troughend at the February Gosforth trial, shortly before Waterloo.

== Waterloo Cup 1889 ==
Fullerton was to meet Troughend again at the Waterloo Cup. For Waterloo Fullerton was still something of an unknown quantity, but he attracted initial betting long odds of 1000 to 110 against, suggesting that success for Fullerton was considered a possibility by the bookmakers given the need to win six consecutive courses.

Fullerton nevertheless won the Waterloo Cup on 22 February 1889, but in an enforced division, the cup was shared with Troughend, who was Fullerton's half brother, and also owned by Col. North and trained by Dent. The stewards' ruling to award the cup jointly to Fullerton and Troughend was not popular with the event's spectators, who favoured another greyhound, Herschel, who Fullerton beat in the fifth round.

== Waterloo Cup 1890 ==
For the February 1890 run of the Waterloo Cup, the odds changed markedly, and Fullerton ended as 6-4 favourite. This was despite the fact that the dog had only had one other trial at Kempton in December 1889. Fullerton won the Waterloo Cup comprehensively, leading five lengths in the deciding course, against Downpour. The Liverpool Mercury's report showed how the spectators' view of Fullerton had changed since the previous encounter: "Fullerton's victory was universally popular, for though the general public did not win much money, still every sportsman was glad to see such a magnificent greyhound win".

== Waterloo Cup 1891 ==
Fullerton's reputation was now well established and the opening odds on offer were 7 to 2, with the second favourite trailing out at 100 to 8. His final run, against Faster and Faster, was decisive, even if some observers felt that it was a less impressive encounter with the hare, compared to the previous rounds, or the year before, and the year after.

== Waterloo Cup 1892 ==
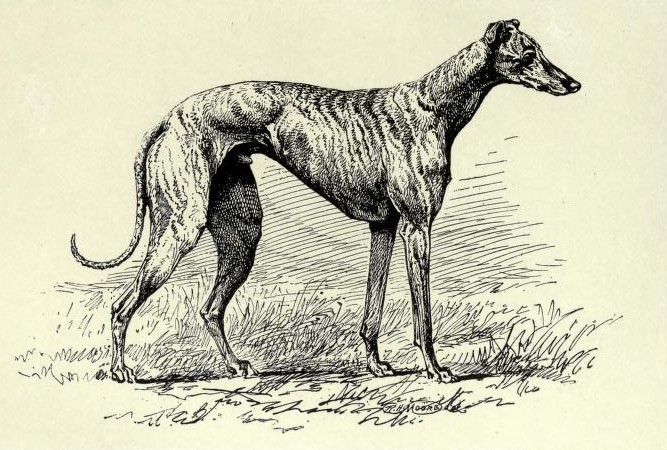
Fullerton, greyhound, by R H Moore, published 1892

The 1892 event was delayed by a day due to frost. Fullerton's performance in the 1892 Waterloo Cup series was deemed by both Hall and Cox - who were both present - as being the dog's finest outing. The 64 dogs in the knockout competition was dominated by the lineage of Greentick, sire of Fullerton but also of 24 other greyhounds. In the final Fullerton beat Fitz Fife, with odds of 9 to 2 on. Unlike Master McGrath on his final Waterloo Cup, Fullerton still gave every appearance as being at the top of his sport.

== Waterloo Cup 1893 ==
Fullerton's successes came to an end in February 1893, when having won the first round against Castlemartin, he was defeated in the second round by Full Captain. Fullerton was the 4 to 1 favourite, but fell into a ditch, leaving the way clear for Full Captain. Fullerton attracted cheers of sympathy from the spectators when he was led off. This outcome still left Fullerton qualified for the next day's Waterloo Plate competition, but it was subsequently announced at dinner at the Adelphi Hotel in Liverpoool that Fullerton would be permanently retired from racing and would therefore not compete for the Plate. The winner of the 1893 Waterloo Cup was Character.

== Retirement ==
After Fullerton's unsuccessful appearance in 1893, he was initially allocated to stud duties at North's Avery Hill house near London, which was not successful. This appears to have been an unhappy time for Fullerton, soon after he escaped, and was lost for several days until found in a poor condition by a postman in Limpsfield. North gave the postman a £40 reward, just under a year's wages. His breeder felt that he was trying to return to Northumberland. North, who died in May 1896, bequeathed the ownership of Fullerton back to Dent in his will. Fullerton returned to Shortflatt Tower, where he became Dent's canine companion until the dog's death.

== Death ==
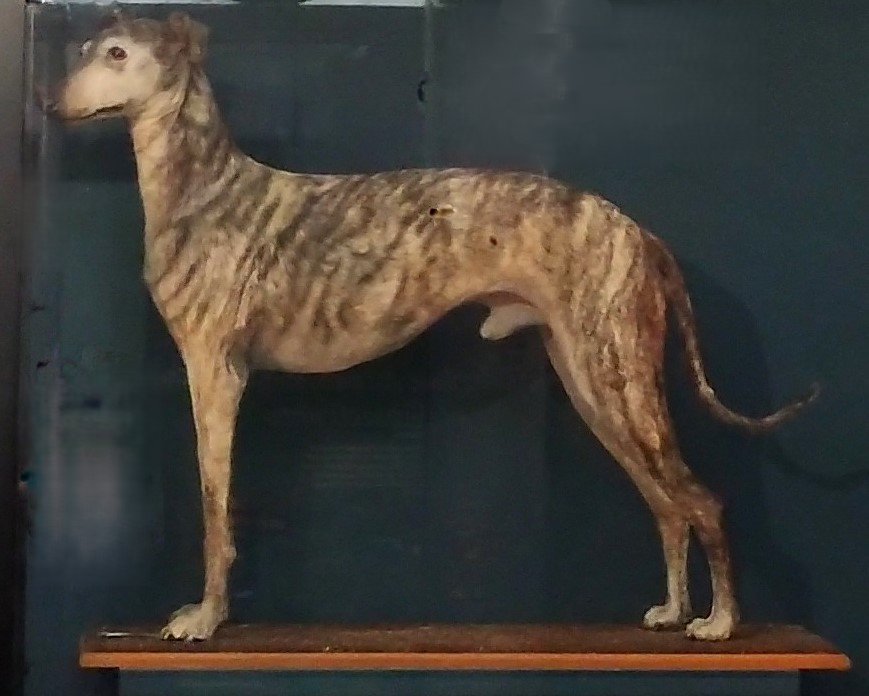
Fullerton, taxidermic representation in the Natural History Museum at Tring.

Fullerton died in 5 June 1899 at Shortflatt Tower, at the age of twelve. News of his death was reported as far away as Queensland, Australia. His body was preserved, and Fullerton is now an exhibit in gallery 6, cabinet 77, of the National History Museum in Tring, Hertfordshire.

== Legacy ==
Fullerton was described as one of the best greyhounds ever to run in England. His record of four Waterloo Cup wins was never matched before or since by any other greyhound, and given that the Cup's final event was in 2005 it is destined to be the dog's permanent legacy. Fullerton competed in a total of 33 courses, winning all but two, and with a total of £2,000 in prize money. In comparison Master McGrath won £1,750 in prize money from his 37 courses, losing only the last one. Fullerton's formidable reputation was well established, however for some people involved in hare-coursing there were rival greyhounds in contention. Harding Cox, who was an unsuccessful underbidder for Fullerton at the December 1888 auction, solicited the views of owners, trainers and breeders, asking a series of questions for his book. The circulars were sent out in 1891 after Fullerton's third victory, but before his fourth. Fullerton was top of the poll for best-looking greyhound and the best greyhound the voters had seen run, but not for the first question: When asked to list the twelve greatest greyhound of the 19th-century, Fullerton got 27 votes, beaten by his great-great grandmother, Bab at the Bowster, with 28 votes, with Master McGrath leading the poll with 32 votes.

Edward Dent died in May 1926 and is buried in St. Andrew's Church, Bolam, Northumberland. In his will Dent bequeathed an endowment of £1,000 to the Royal Victoria Infirmary (RVI) in Newcastle upon Tyne for the "Dent Fullerton Bed", which as of May 2026 is equivalent to £55,800. Lord Armstrong, chairman of the board of governors for the RVI and the hospital's main benefactor, said he was very pleased to accept the endowment.

== Fullerton in art ==
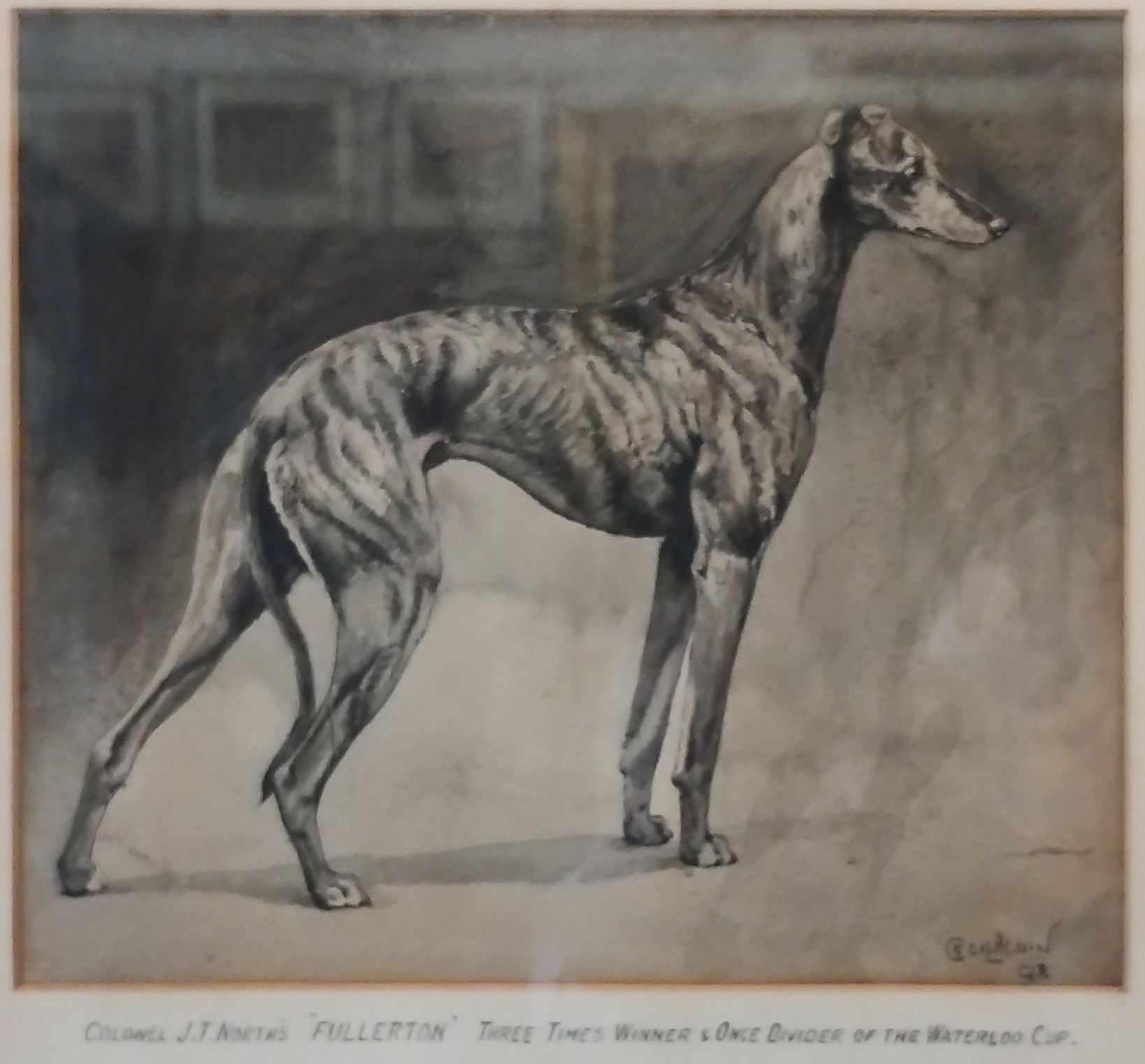
Fullerton - pencil and watercolour picture by Cecil Aldin

In addition to the preserved body of Fullerton at the National History Museum, Fullerton features in three oil paintings. Two were by the Northumberland artist John Charlton: one shows Fullerton with his mother, Bit of Fashion, the other shows him with Edward Dent seated on a bench outside Shortflatt Tower. In 1892 he was depicted by Cecil Aldin in a pencil and watercolour painting.

== Pedigree ==
Pedigree of Fullerton
Sire Greentick	Bedfellow	Contango	Cashier
Sire Greentick	Bedfellow	Contango	Bab at the Bowster
Sire Greentick	Bedfellow	Bed of Stone	Portland
Sire Greentick	Bedfellow	Bed of Stone	Imperatrice
Sire Greentick	Heartburn	Blackburn	Lancaster
Sire Greentick	Heartburn	Blackburn	Kitty Malone
Sire Greentick	Heartburn	Nancy	Repealed Hop Duty
Sire Greentick	Heartburn	Nancy	Merry Wife
Dam Bit of Fashion	Paris	Ptarmigan	Contango
Dam Bit of Fashion	Paris	Ptarmigan	Petronella (l. Graceful)
Dam Bit of Fashion	Paris	Gallant Foe	Don Antonio
Dam Bit of Fashion	Paris	Gallant Foe	Maggie Smith
Dam Bit of Fashion	Pretty Nell	Countryman	Regulus
Dam Bit of Fashion	Pretty Nell	Countryman	Ristori
Dam Bit of Fashion	Pretty Nell	Sister to Saxon	Willie Wyllie (l. Vexation)
Dam Bit of Fashion	Pretty Nell	Sister to Saxon	Miss Johnson

Bit of Fashion won the Waterloo Cup in 1885 for Edward Dent, in a divided cup decision. Greentick was the runner-up in the Waterloo Cup of 1884.
