= Bob Wright (greyhound trainer) =

Robert Wright (1886–1943) was an English greyhound trainer, and the second eldest son of Joe Wright, who had achieved training success with two Waterloo Cup winners in the late 19th century. A member of a famous family of greyhound trainers for the Waterloo Cup and a well-known figure on the track, Bob, as he was known, trained for many years at La Mancha Kennels, Halsall, near Ormskirk, Lancashire. There he trained for Major Cuthbert Blundell and Mr H Pilkington.

The following is a list of the Waterloo Cup winning greyhounds that he trained:

- 1925 Pentonville
- 1930 Church Street
- 1932 Ben Tinto
