= Harold Wright (greyhound trainer) =

Harold Wright (1884–1974) was a notable greyhound trainer, famed for training nine winners of the Waterloo Cup. Born in Ditton, Lancashire he was the eldest son of Joe Wright, who achieved training success with two Waterloo Cup winners in the late 19th century. He established his kennels initially at Preston Brook, Cheshire and then later at Formby, Lancashire. Among the noted owners that he trained for were; Lord Tweedmouth, the Duke of Leeds, Major Hugh Peel, of Bryn-Y-Pys, Overton-on-Dee and Colonel J.E. Dennis.

The following is a list of the Waterloo Cup winning greyhounds that he trained:

- 1912 Tide Time
- 1922 Guards Brigade
- 1934 Bryn Truthful
- 1935 Dee Rock
- 1940 Dee Flint
- 1941 Swinging Light
- 1942 Swinging Light
- 1945 Bryn Tritoma
- 1946 Maesydd Michael
