= Master McGrath =

Hare coursing greyhound dog

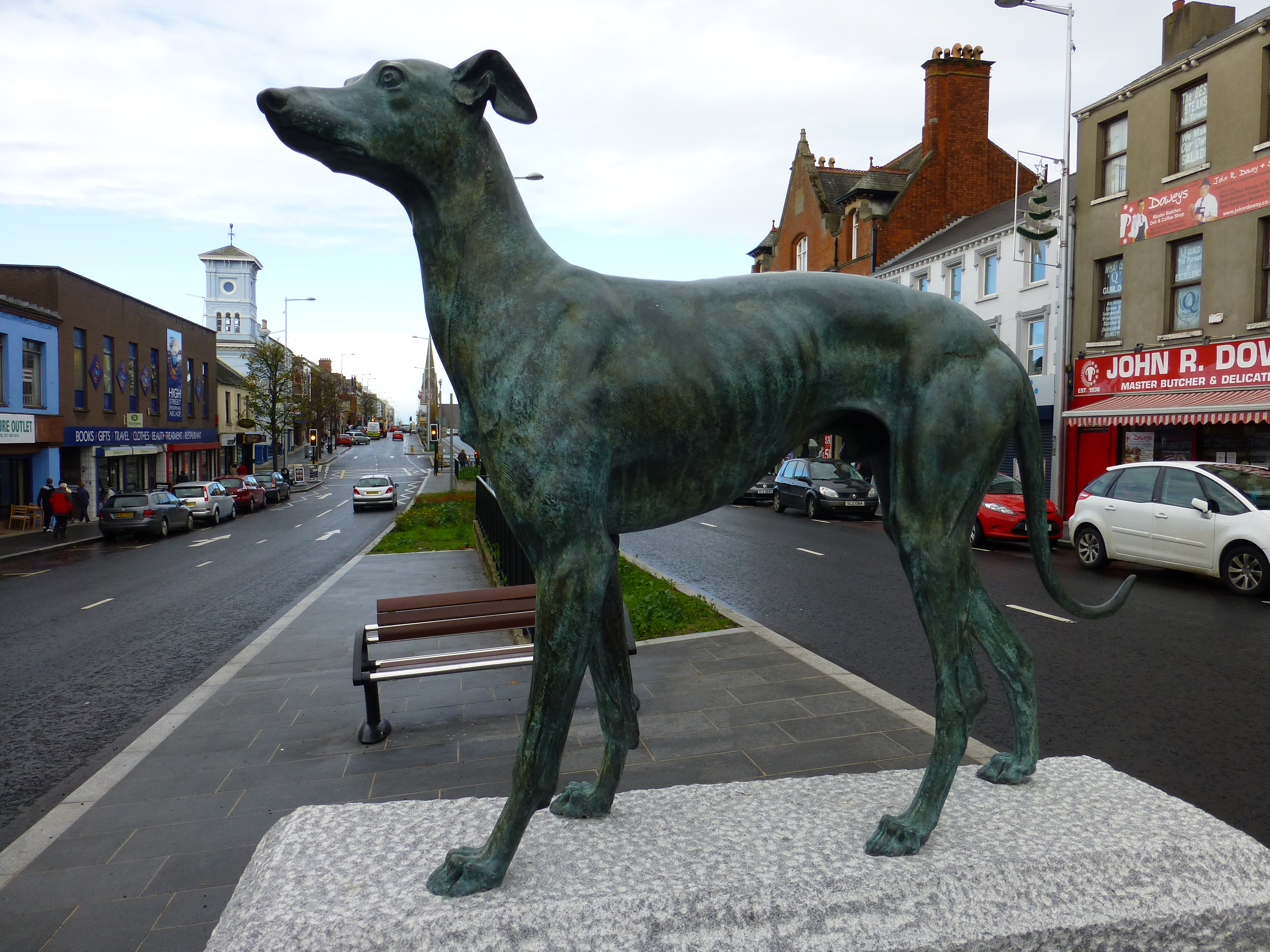
- Bronze sculpture of Master McGrath in Lurgan, County Armagh
- Other name: Dicksy
- Species: Canis lupus familiaris
- Breed: Greyhound
- Sex: Male
- Born: 1866; Colligan Lodge; County Waterford, Ireland
- Died: 1871
- Resting place: Lurgan, County Armagh
- Known for: Hare coursing
- Term: 1868, 1869 and 1871
- Owner: The 2nd Baron Lurgan
- Weight: 24 kg (53 lb)
- Appearance: Black and white
- Awards: Waterloo Cup

Master McGrath (1866–1871) was a Greyhound in the bloodsport of hare coursing.

Raised in County Waterford, Ireland, Master McGrath is famous for being the first dog to win the Waterloo Cup three times.

== Early days ==
Master McGrath was born in Waterford, sired by a dog sent by Lord Lurgan from Armagh for breeding. Master McGrath was born in 1866 at Colligan Lodge, the home of James Galwey, a well-known trainer and owner of greyhounds. Master McGrath was one of a litter of seven pups and although small was powerfully built. As a pup, his pet name was "Dicksy". Initially destined to be drowned, a local boy named McGrath asked that he was spared, and he went on to become the most celebrated and successful dog of his time, and was brought to meet Queen Victoria, at her request.

== First trial; ==
The dog showed none of the outstanding qualities which were later to make him famous at his first trial; his performance was so bad that his trainer ordered him to be given away. As luck would have it his "slipper" (handler) took charge of him and having more faith in him, entered him in several courses which he won. After these wins, he was returned to his trainer.

== Waterloo Cup ==
He won the Waterloo Cup on three occasions, 1868, 1869 and 1871. He became such a celebrity that his owner, The 2nd Baron Lurgan, was asked to take him to be seen by Queen Victoria and the British royal family. His success enabled Lord Lurgan to build a terrace of houses in Walthamstow from Master McGrath's winnings. These houses now form part of Shernhall Street, but are still clearly marked at one end of the terrace as "Master McGrath Terrace". The plaque commemorating Master McGrath can be found in the upper part of number 18 Shernhall Street.

== Death ==
Master McGrath died early in 1873 of heart disease which had already ended his career as a sire. An autopsy showed that his heart was twice the size of a normal dog's heart. He was buried in the grounds of a house called "Solitude" in Lurgan. The house has since been demolished for development and Master McGrath's grave lies at a house once owned by an early English settler.

== Information ==
- Name: Master McGrath
- Pet Name: Dicksy
- Color: BKW
- Sex: male
- Weight: 24 kg (53 lb)
- Date Of Birth:1866
- Land Of Birth: Ireland
- Breeder: James Galway Waterford
- Owner: Lord Lurgan

== Song and Ballad – Master McGrath ==
Eighteen sixty nine being the date and the year,
Those Waterloo sportsmen and more did appear;
For to gain the great prizes and bear them away,
Never counting on Ireland and Master McGrath.

On the twelfth of December, that day of renown,
McGrath and his keeper they left Lurgan town;
A gale in the Channel, it soon drove them o'er,
On the thirteenth they landed on fair England's shore.

And when they arrived there in big London town,
Those great English sportsmen all gathered round -
And one of the gentlemen gave a "Ha! Ha!" Saying,
"Is that the great dog you call Master McGrath?"

And one of those gentlemen standing around
Says, "I don't care a damn for your Irish greyhound,"
And another he laughs with a scornful "Ha! Ha!
We'll soon humble the pride of your Master McGrath."

Then Lord Lurgan stepped forward and said, "Gentlemen,
If there's any among you has money to spend -
For your grand english nobles I don't care a straw -
Here's five thousand to one upon Master McGrath."

Then McGrath he looked up and he wagged his old tail,
Informing his lordship, "I know what you mane,
Don't fear, noble Brownlow, don't fear them, agra,
For I'll tarnish their laurels," says Master McGrath.

And Rose stood uncovered, the great English pride,
Her master and keeper were close by her side;
They have let her away and the crowd cried "Hurrah!"
For the pride of all England – and Master McGrath.

As Rose and the Master they both ran along,
"Now I wonder," says Rose, "what took you from your home;
You should have stayed there in your Irish domain,
And not come to gain laurels on Albion's plain."

"Well, I know," says McGrath, "we have wild heather bogs
But you'll find in old Ireland there's good men and dogs.
Lead on, bold Britannia, give none of your jaw,
Stuff that up your nostrils," says Master McGrath.

Then the hare she went on just as swift as the wind
He was sometimes before her and sometimes behind.
Rose gave the first turn according to law;
But the second was given by Master McGrath.

The hare she led on with a wonderful view.
And swift as the wind o'er the green field she flew.
But he jumped on her back and he held up his paw
"Three cheers for old Ireland," says Master McGrath.

I've known many greyhounds that filled me with pride,
In the days that are gone, but it can't be denied,
That the greatest and the bravest that the world ever saw,
Was our champion of champions, great Master McGrath.

There was also a tune; "The Master McGrath Gallop" by H. R. Callcott R.A.M. (Composer of The Massereene Waltzes)

== Honours ==
- Waterloo Cup 1868, 1869, 1871

== Pedigree ==
Figaro
St Clair
Black Fly
Dervock
Lightfoot
Erin
Jenny Lind
Master McGrath
Motley
David
Wanton
Lady Sarah
Larriston
Lady Watford
Consideration

== See also ==
- List of individual dogs
