= National Coursing Club =

National Coursing Club Greyhound Stud Book
- Formation: 1858
- Type: Sports Association
- Headquarters: Suffolk
- Website: www.greyhoundstudbook.co.uk

The National Coursing Club (NCC) also known as the Greyhound Stud Book (GSB) is the national registration association for British Bred greyhounds and was formerly the national association for hare coursing in Britain.

== History ==
The first public coursing in Britain is reputed to have started at Swaffham in 1776, with the first major event the Waterloo Cup at Altcar in Liverpool being inaugurated in 1836. The NCC was founded in 1858.

In 1882 the NCC created the Greyhound Stud Book, which it has administered ever since. All British bred greyhounds used for coursing and later Greyhound racing in the United Kingdom had to be registered with the Stud Book. A Secretary and a 'Keeper' of the Greyhound Stud Book are appointed by the NCC and there have only been nine appointments since 1882.

Today the NCC/GSB's sole purpose is to register British bred greyhounds. Their role in coursing came to an end following the Hunting Act 2004, which banned hare coursing in Britain during 2004.

British bred greyhounds only form a small percentage of greyhounds that race in the United Kingdom, most are bred in Ireland. A decline in British breeding has been seen in recent years, mainly due to the reduction of race tracks in the United Kingdom but incentives for the British bred greyhounds are on the increase.

== Litters registered ==
Year	Litters
2010	339
2011	327
2012	305
2013	251
2014	294
2015	250
2016	212
2017	241
2018	204
2019	206

== National Meetings ==
The association held several major meetings, the most valuable being the Waterloo Cup. Others included the Barbican Cup.

== Clubs ==
Some of the clubs that were associated with the NCC:

- Alresford
- Altcar
- Bryn-y-Pys
- Colchester
- Coquetdale & Border
- Cotswold
- East of England
- Huntingdon
- Isle of Ely
- Isle of Wight
- Kimberley & Wymondham
- North Herts
- North Lincs
- Oxfordshire
- Old Yorkshire
- Ryedale
- Scottish National
- South of England and Newmarket
- Swaffham
- Yeovil & Sherbourne
