= Joe Wright (greyhound trainer) =

Born Joseph Wright (born 1855) in Waverton, Cheshire, the eldest son of Joseph & Anne Wright of Avenue Farm, previous of The White Lion Inn.

Initially employed as a farm servant on his father's farm he moved to Ditton, Cheshire and worked with his brother Jack Wright to establish his kennels for training greyhounds for coursing. When his brother moved to Scotland, he carried on as a dog trainer at Ditton, Cheshire for Mr. Leonard Pilkington (founder of the Pilkington glass firm).

Moving to Formby in the late 19th century to Park Farm, in addition to farming he was a courser and trainer, in which activities he achieved great success and was known from one end of the coursing country to the other as "Joe". Joseph Wright was an outstanding personality and a great man in his profession. He trained Burnaby and Thoughtless Beauty (winners of the Waterloo Cup in 1888 and 1895) and Paracelus and Prince Plausible, the runners up in 1903 and 1905. He won and divided the Netherby Cup with Pins and Needles, Pennegant, Pelerine, Pursebearer, Paracelus and Prince Rupert, Penelope II, Peregrine Pickle, Persine Beauty and Pentonville.

His sons Harold, Bob, Tom, Joe and George all followed their father's footsteps as trainers. His brothers Jack Wright and Tom Wright, were well known in sporting circles, and on many occasions trained competitors of the Waterloo Cup.

He died in 1923 at Park Farm, Raven Meols Lane, Formby after a long illness at the age of 69 years. During the burial service, at St Peters, Formby a sincere tribute was paid by the Canon in a short address, in which he referred to Joe Wright as a good Christian and a good sportsman. He was a good loser and a good winner, chivalrous in defeat and victory alike.
