= Joe Wright (disambiguation) =

Joe Wright is an English film director.

Joe Wright may also refer to:

- Joe Wright (baseball) (1869–1909), baseball player
- Joe Wright (basketball) (born 1963), American basketball player
- Joe Wright (businessman) (born 1938), American businessman
- Joe Wright (footballer, born 1907) (1907–1936), English football goalkeeper
- Joe Wright (footballer, born 1995), Welsh footballer for Doncaster Rovers
- Joe Wright (greyhound trainer) (1855–1923)
- Joe Wright (Kentucky politician) (1940–2023), Kentucky politician and businessman
- Joe Wright (rower) (born 1992), New Zealand rower
- Joe Wright (rugby league) (1908–1967), English rugby league footballer

== See also ==
- Joseph Wright (disambiguation)
- Joey Wright (born 1968), retired American basketball player
