= Corrie Coursing Meeting =

The coursing meeting for greyhounds that was held at Corrie, near Lockerbie in Dumfries and Galloway consisted of several stakes that were competed for. The meeting took place on land belonging to Andrew Jardine of Lanrick Castle, brother of Robert Jardine.

== The Corrie Cup ==
- 1869 Wave.
- 1872 Magenta and Avonside divided.
- 1873 Ironshell.
- 1875 Polly Perkins.
- 1876 Fairy Glen.
- 1877 Faithful.
- 1878 Miss Walker.
- 1883 Annie Macpherson.
- 1888 Miss Jessie II and Picadilly divided.
- 1889 Jim 'O The Hill.

== The Castlemilk Stakes ==
- 1869 George Heriot.
- 1872 Muriel and Border Chief divided.

== The Hutton Stakes ==
- 1873 Macgregor and Cement divided.
- 1875 Benlomond.
- 1876 Serag.
- 1877 Shepherdess.
- 1878 Highland Mary.
- 1883 Borneo and Soger Hugh divided.
- 1888 Asteria and Glenderg divided.
- 1889 Powfoot and Clyde Spray divided.

== The Penlaw Stakes ==
- 1873 Agnes and Old England divided.
- 1876 Wee Wee.
- 1878 Bonnie Scotland.
- 1888 Dandeleur and Cloudy Morn divided.

== The Corrielaw Stakes ==
- 1878 Duchess of Devon.
- 1888 Abandoned due to weather.

== The Tenants Cup ==
- 1883 Mosshill.
