= USS Courser =

Two ships of the United States Navy have been named Courser for one who moves from one point to another, or pursues a quarry.

- USS Courser (AMc-32), was a World War II coastal minesweeper.
- USS Courser (AMS-6), was laid down 28 August 1942 as YMS-201 by the Hiltebrant Dry Dock Company, in Kingston, New York.
