= Al-Adiyat =

100th chapter of the Qur'an

Surah 100 of the Quran
العاديات Al-ʿĀdiyāt The War Horses
- Qira'ah; English text
- Classification: Meccan
- Other names: The Chargers, The Assaulters
- Position: Juzʼ 30
- No. of verses: 11
- No. of words: 40
- No. of letters: 168

Al-Adiyat
Recitation of Al-Adiyat in mujawwad.

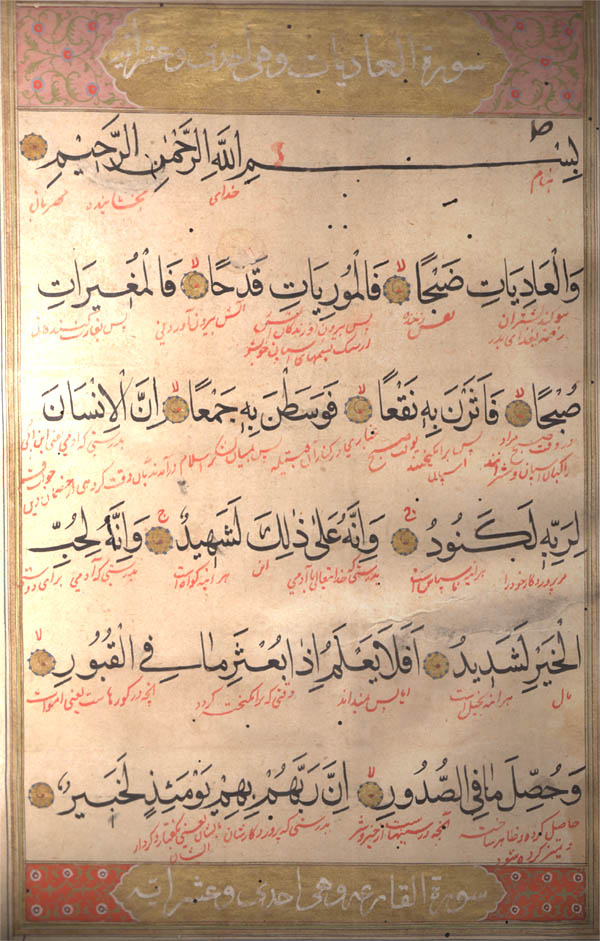
Page from an 18th-century Qur'an showing al-Adiyat in naskh script with a Persian translation in red.

Al-Adiyat or The War Horses which run swiftly (Arabic: العاديات, al-ʿādiyāt, also known as "The Coursers, The Chargers") is the 100th chapter (sūrah) of the Qur'an, with 11 āyāt or verses. Regarding the timing and contextual background of the revelation (asbāb al-nuzūl), it is an earlier "Meccan surah", which means it is believed to have been revealed in Mecca, rather than later in Medina.

== Summary ==
- 1-6 Oaths that man is ungrateful to his God
- 7-8 Man loves the things of this world
- 9-11 Man’s secret thoughts shall be discovered on the judgment day

== Text ==
=== Text and meaning ===
بِسْمِ ٱللَّهِ ٱلرَّحْمَٰنِ ٱلرَّحِيمِ ۝
In the name of Allāh, the Entirely Merciful, the Especially Merciful.

وَٱلْعَٰدِيَٰتِ ضَبْحًا ۝١
By the racers, panting,

فَٱلْمُورِيَٰتِ قَدْحًا ۝٢
And the producers of sparks (when) striking

فَٱلْمُغِيرَٰتِ صُبْحًا ۝٣
And the chargers at dawn,

فَأَثَرْنَ بِهِۦ نَقْعًا ۝٤
Stirring up thereby (clouds of) dust,

فَوَسَطْنَ بِهِۦ جَمْعًا۝٥
Arriving thereby in the center collectively,

إِنَّ ٱلْإِنسَٰنَ لِرَبِّهِۦ لَكَنُودٌ ۝٦
Indeed mankind, to his Lord, is ungrateful.

وَإِنَّهُۥ عَلَىٰ ذَٰلِكَ لَشَهِيدٌ ۝٧
And indeed, he is to that a witness.

وَإِنَّهُۥ لِحُبِّ ٱلْخَيْرِ لَشَدِيدٌ ۝٨
And indeed he is, in love of wealth, intense.

أَفَلَا يَعْلَمُ إِذَا بُعْثِرَ مَا فِى ٱلْقُبُورِ ۝٩
But does he not know that when the contents of the graves are scattered

وَحُصِّلَ مَا فِى ٱلصُّدُورِ ۝١٠
And that within the breasts is obtained,

إِنَّ رَبَّهُم بِهِمْ يَوْمَئِذٍ لَّخَبِيرٌۢ ۝١١
Indeed, their Lord with them, that Day, is (fully) Aware.

Translation: Sahih International

== Period of revelation ==
Whether this Surah Al-Adiyat is a Makki or a Madani is disputed. But the subject matter of the Surah and its style clearly indicate that it is not only Makki, but was revealed in the early stage of Makkan period. Abdullah bin Masud, Jabir, Hasan Basri, Ikrimah, and Ata say that it is Makki. Anas bin Malik, and Qatadah say that it is Madani; and from Ibn Abbas two views have been reported, first that it is a Makki Surah, and second that it is Madani. But the subject matter of the Surah and its style clearly indicate that it is not only Makki but was revealed in the earliest stage of Makkah. So the surah is considered to be Meccan conclusively.

== Hadith ==
According to hadith, this surah is recommended in Maghrib prayer.

- Hisham ibn Urwah said that his father used to recite the surahs like Al-Adiyat, which was recited. Abu Dawud said: This indicates that those (traditions indicating long surahs) are abrogated, and this is more sound tradition.
- According to a narration from Imam Sadiq, whoever recites Surah Al-Adiyat and continues to recite it, God will raise him up with Ali ibn Abi Talib on the Day of Judgment and he will be by his side and among his companions.
- It has been narrated from the Prophet the virtue of reciting this Surah is as much as the virtue of reciting half of the Qur'an.
