= Joseph Wright (greyhound trainer) =

Born Joseph Wright (born c. 1824) in Waverton, Cheshire, the second eldest son of Joseph & Ann Wright.

== Career ==
Joseph Wright became one of the best known breeders and trainers of coursing greyhounds in the United Kingdom. He kept an extensive breeding and training establishment at Waverton, and his pedigree puppies annually offered high prices and won many noted events.

== Controversy ==
He became involved in a court case regarding dog licences, where one of his employees was found with four greyhounds that were allegedly unlicensed. The reporting media noted that it was a case of considerable importance for large owners of greyhounds. The magistrates were eventually satisfied that the dogs were licensed, but noted that it was desirable that separate licences were granted for separate packs of greyhounds.

== Family ==
Joseph Wright was the father of four well known celebrities in the coursing world - Jack Wright, Joe Wright, Robert Kelsell Wright and Tom Wright.

He died on 17 June 1908 at Well House Farm, Waverton, Cheshire.
