= Robert Wright (English footballer) =

English footballer

Personal information
- Full name: Robert Wright
- Date of birth: 1880
- Place of birth: Liverpool, England
- Date of death: Unknown
- Position: Half-back

Senior career*
Years	Team	Apps	(Gls)
1906–1907	Everton	1	(0)
1907	Burnley	2	(0)
- * Club domestic league appearances and goals

Robert Wright (born 1880, date of death unknown) was an English professional footballer who played as a half-back.

Wright started his career at Everton in 1906. He played only one match for the club, featuring in the 2–3 defeat away at Bolton Wanderers on 3 March 1906. In June 1907, he joined Football League Second Division side Burnley and made his debut in the 1–3 loss to Hull City on 21 September 1907. Wright made one further appearance for the club in the 2–2 draw with Derby County the following week, but was released shortly afterwards.
