= Jon Wright (footballer) =

English footballer

Personal information
- Full name: Jonathan Wright
- Date of birth: 30 January 1925
- Place of birth: Newburn, Northumberland, England
- Date of death: 22 February 2015 (aged 90)
- Place of death: Durham, England
- Position: Inside forward

Senior career*
Years	Team	Apps	(Gls)
1947–1949	Darlington	17	(0)
1949–19??	Horden Colliery Welfare		
- * Club domestic league appearances and goals

Jonathan Wright (30 January 1925 – 22 February 2015) was an English footballer who played as an inside forward in the Football League for Darlington. He made his debut on 1 March 1947, standing in for Charlie Stubbs at inside right in a 4–1 win against Rochdale, and made three more appearances towards the end of that season. He had a run of 11 matches at the end of the following season, and played his final first-team match in September 1948. He went on to play for North-Eastern League club Horden Colliery Welfare.

Wright was born in Newburn, Northumberland, in 1925 and died in Durham in 2015 at the age of 90.
