= Robert Wright (Calvinist priest) =

Robert Wright (1556?–1624) was an English Anglican priest, a nonconformist under Elizabeth I.

Wright matriculated as a pensioner of Trinity College, Cambridge, on 21 May 1571, and graduated B.A. 1574, and M.A. 1578. He was an ardent Calvinist, and received ordination at Antwerp from Villiers or Cartwright in the Genevan form. At Cambridge, he became acquainted with Robert, second lord Rich, and about 1580 acted as his chaplain in his house, Great Leighs, Essex, where he held religious meetings (Strype, Aylmer, pp. 54 seq.). He was incorporated M.A. of Oxford on 11 July 1581. After several efforts on Bishop Aylmer's part to obtain the arrest of Wright, he and his patron were examined in the court of ecclesiastical commission in October 1581 in the presence of Lord Burghley. It was shown that Wright had asked, in regard to the solemnisation of the queen's accession day (17 Nov.), ‘if they would make it an holy day, and so make our queen an idol. Wright was committed to the Fleet prison. Next year the prison-keeper on his own authority permitted him to visit his wife in Essex, but complaints were made of this lenient treatment to Lord Burghley. Wright appealed for mercy to Burghley, who replied by informing him of the charges brought against him. Wright sent a voluminous answer (Strype, Annals, iii. ii. 228). He seems to have returned to prison and remained there until September 1582, when he declared his willingness to subscribe to his good allowance of the ministry of the church of England and to the Book of Common Prayer. After giving sureties for his future conformity, he was released. He was subsequently rector of Dennington, Suffolk, from 1589 until his death in 1624.

== Personal life ==
He was the son of John Wright of Wright's Bridge and Alice Wood, Essex. He died in 1624.
