= Robert William Wright =

American journalist

Robert William Wright (February 22, 1816 – January 9, 1885) was an American lawyer, politician, newspaper editor, and author who used the pseudonyms Horatius Flaccus and Quevedo Redivivus, Jr.

== Biography ==
Wright, third son of Stephen and Zibrah (Richardson) Wright, was born in Ludlow, Vermont, February 22, 1816. He graduated from Yale College in 1842. For three years after graduation he was engaged in teaching in the public Grammar Schools in Boston, at the same time studying law. He was admitted to the bar in the autumn of 1845, and immediately went to Wisconsin Territory. He settled in the spring of 1846 in Waukesha (then Prairieville), where he resided for ten years, actively engaged in the practice of his profession. In the fall of 1852 he declined the Whig nomination for Congress in his district.

He left Wisconsin in the spring of 1856, intending to settle in Selma, Alabama; but the outlook being unfavorable, he went instead to Waterbury, Connecticut, where he remained for three years, engaged in the practice of law, and a part of the time editing a weekly newspaper, as well as serving for one year as Judge of Probate. From 1859 to 1872 his residence was in New Haven, and during most of that time he was engaged in journalism; he was also Executive Secretary of Governor James E. English for three years. From 1872 to 1883 he resided in Cheshire, Conn., still engaged in literary work; here also he served for one year as Judge of Probate.

He made many contributions to magazines, and published a number of poems, chiefly satirical. In 1880 he published a volume called Life; its True Genesis (12mo pp 298), which he considered to be a complete refutation of the Darwinian theory of evolution; he was preparing a continuation of this work, when stricken with his last illness.

He married, August 13, 1844, Launne L., daughter of Capt. John Luke, of St. Armand, Lower Canada, who died on May 29, 1851. He next married, on October 14, 1852, Sarah L., daughter of the Rev. Job H. Martyn, of New York City, who survived him with one daughter and one son.

From Cheshire he moved, late in 1883, to Cleveland, Ohio, where he died suddenly of congestion of the brain on January 9, 1885, at the age of 69.
