= Hare coursing =

Competitive activity where sighthounds pursue hares

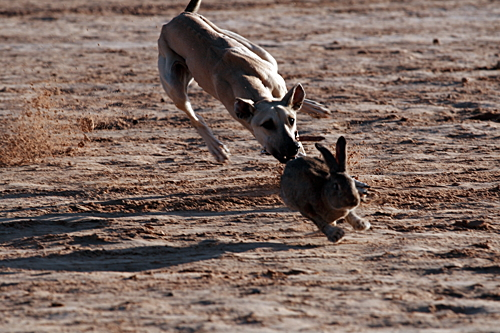
Sloughi coursing a hare

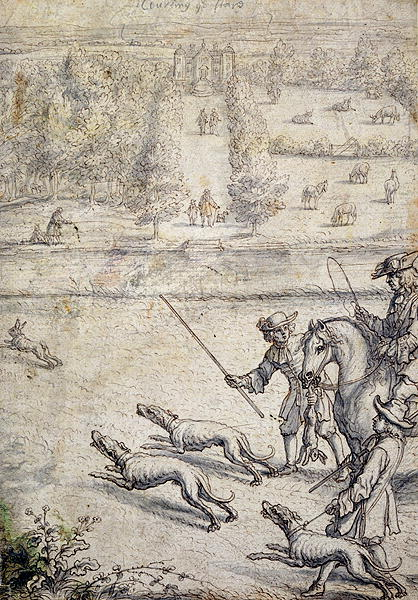
Coursing the hare, Francis Barlow, 1686

Hare coursing is the pursuit of hares with greyhounds and other sighthounds, which chase the hare by sight, not by scent.

In most countries it has been banned for cruelty, however in some countries it remains a regulated activity with live animals. Dogs are set to chase and try to overtake and turn a hare, rather than hunting to capture or kill the game. It has a number of variations in its rules around the world. Coursing has been used in the past as a form of hunting and pest control. It is a long-established form of hunting, practiced historically in England with greyhounds or sighthound breeds, or with lurchers which are crossbred sighthounds. The sport grew in popularity in Europe during the 19th century but has since experienced a decline due in part to the introduction of greyhound racing with betting, and laws passed that have banned the practice.

In recent decades, controversy has developed around hare coursing, with some viewing the bloodsport as too cruel and a form of torture for both hares and dogs. Hare coursing is illegal in the United Kingdom. In other countries, including Spain, Portugal, Ireland and the Western United States, it is a regulated sport, however with some public protest.

In 2026 an attempt to ban the activity in Ireland was defeated after Sinn Féin backed the Government.

== History ==
Whether for sporting or hunting purposes, hare coursing was in Europe historically restricted to landowners and the nobility, who used sighthounds, the ownership of which was at certain historic times prohibited among the lower social classes.

The oldest documented description of hare coursing is the work known in English as On Coursing. It was written by Arrian a Greek historian of the Roman period, circa 180 AD and is known in Ancient Greek as Kynegetikos and in Latin as Cynegeticus. Arrian felt compelled to describe the sight hunt and sighthounds because the Ancient Greeks only knew the scent hunt; On Coursing complements Xenophon's classic work on that subject, Cynegeticus (On Hunting). William Dansey, an English clergyman, translated On Coursing in 1831.

It is from Arrian that the most famous quote on the sporting fairness of coursing originates: "... true huntsmen do not take out their hounds to catch the creature, but for a trial of speed and a race, and they are satisfied if the hare manages to find something that will rescue her".

=== Formal coursing ===
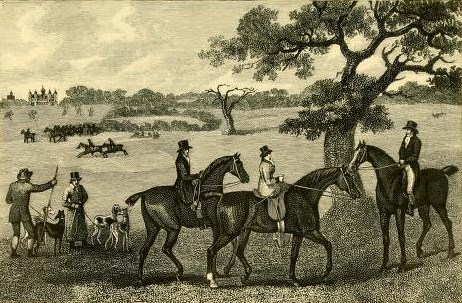
Coursing at Hatfield, an engraving by John Francis Sartorius, depicts Emily Cecil, Marchioness of Salisbury riding side-saddle.

The competitive version of hare coursing was given definitive form when the first complete set of English rules, known as the Laws of the Leash, was drawn up in the reign of Elizabeth I reputedly by Thomas Howard, 4th Duke of Norfolk, providing for a pursuit of no more than two hounds, a headstart termed "Law" to be given to the hare for a fair run, and for the manner of awarding points on "Speed", "Go-bye", "Turn", "Wrench", "Kill" and "Trip", to judge the dogs' performance.

The first modern coursing club was established at Swaffham in 1776, and the National Coursing Club was founded to regulate the sport in 1858. From 1876 coursing meets were held at Plumpton, East Sussex and this name was used for such events in Australia.

During the 19th century, coursing crossed the class divide, and reached its peak of popularity, with more than 150 coursing clubs in Britain, some attracting up to 80,000 people. By the late 19th century, hare coursing had become a predominantly working class sport.

Coursing declined during the 20th century, notably due to the development of urban greyhound racing in the 1920s and there were fewer than 30 coursing clubs in the UK by 2000.

=== Informal coursing ===
The oldest form of hare coursing simply involved two dogs chasing a hare, the winner being the dog that caught the hare; this could be for sport, food or pest control. In order to indulge in the informal practice, or hunting, various cross breeds (under the generic British term lurchers) have been created; such animals may be specifically bred for coursing, such as the staghounds used to hunt coyote in the United States. Informal coursing has long been closely associated with pheasant hunting or poaching, lacking the landowner's permission, and is often seen as a problem by the local public, landowners and the police. Clubs affiliated to the Association of Lurcher Clubs organised informal coursing with the landowner's permission, sometimes using a single lurcher rather than a pair to chase a hare.

=== Lure coursing ===
Lure coursing is a sport for dogs based on hare coursing, but involving dogs chasing a mechanically operated lure. Some critics of hare coursing suggest that coursers could test their dogs through lure coursing. However, coursers believe that, while lure coursing is good athletic exercise for their dogs, it does not approximate the testing vigour and sport of live coursing.

=== Illegal coursing ===
Hare coursing was banned in England and Wales by the Hunting Act 2004. However, as of 2015 it continues, illegally in counties with large areas of flat farmland suitable for hares: Lincolnshire, Cambridgeshire and Norfolk, although criminals may travel large distances to course hares. Hare coursing gangs film the chase so that it can be played later, if and when betting occurs.

== Description of formal coursing ==
Modern hare coursing is practiced using a number of sighthounds: mainly greyhounds but also Borzois, Salukis, Whippets, and Deerhounds that are registered with a governing body such as the National Coursing Club or Kennel Club in Great Britain, the Irish Coursing Club, or the National Open Field Coursing Association (NOFCA) in the US. Events are conducted through local coursing clubs which are regulated by their governing body. The objective of legal formal coursing is to test and judge the athletic ability of the dogs rather than to kill the hare.

Legal, formal hare coursing has a number of variations in how it is undertaken. Open coursing takes place in the open field, and closed coursing (or park or Irish style) takes place in an enclosure with an escape route. Open coursing is either run as walked-up coursing, where a line of people walk through the countryside to flush out a hare, or as driven coursing, where hares are driven by beaters towards the coursing field. In each case, when a suitable hare appears, a person known as a slipper uses a slip with two collars to release two dogs at the same time, in pursuit of the hare which is given a head start (known as fair law), usually between 70–90 metres (80–100 yards). The sighthound is released elsewhere by the handler.

The chased hare will then run at around 40–45 km/h (24–26 mph) and the course will last around 35–40 seconds over 0.5 km (0.3 miles). The greyhounds which pursue the hare will, being faster, start to catch up with it. As greyhounds are much larger than hares but less agile, they find it difficult to follow the hares' sharp turns which they make to evade the dogs. This agility gives the hare an important and often crucial advantage as it seeks to escape. Under some coursing club rules, the dogs are awarded points on how many times they can turn the hare, and how closely they force the hare's progress. In the UK, the contest between the greyhounds was usually judged from horseback, and the winning greyhound proceeded to the next round of a knock-out tournament. The 2003 UK coursing season ran from 1 October to 28 February.

=== Variations in Ireland ===
Hare coursing is popular in Ireland, with the national meeting in Clonmel, County Tipperary, being the largest event in the coursing calendar, attracting 10,000 spectators, and claimed by its organisers to be worth up to €16 million for the local economy. There are around 70 formal coursing clubs in the Republic and two in Northern Ireland, together holding 80–85 meetings per year.

There are several differences between the rules of coursing in Great Britain (where it was regulated by the National Coursing Club) before being banned, and Irish coursing which has been organised by the Irish Coursing Club since 1916. Because hares are not plentiful in all parts of the island of Ireland, mainly due to modern agricultural practices, coursing clubs are licensed by the Irish government to net 70–75 hares for their events. The hares are then transported in boxes to the coursing venue where they are kept for up to eight weeks and trained to be coursed.

Instead of being coursed on open land, the Irish form is run in a secure enclosure over a set distance. Since 1993, Irish Coursing Club rules have made it compulsory for the greyhounds to be muzzled while they chase the hare. After the coursing event, the hares are required to be transported back to where they were netted and re-released into the wild. Whereas the UK form of coursing was run with dogs winning points for their running and turning of the hare, the Irish form is run on the basis that the first dog to turn the hare wins.

=== Variations in the United States ===
Greyhounds were introduced in the Americas for sport and pleasure, they helped farmers control jackrabbits, and organised coursing meets were taking place in the United States in the 19th century, by 1886 according to Gulf Coast Greyhounds. Open field coursing of jackrabbits, which are members of the hare family, now takes place in a number of states in Western America, including California, Montana and Wyoming, and is said by the North American Coursing Association to take place also in Idaho, Nevada, New Mexico and Utah. It takes place with up to four dogs chasing the hare.

The legality of hare coursing across the different states of the US is not always clear. Animal Place, a California-based animal rights group which opposes coursing, claims that the activity is legal in California, Colorado, Nevada, New Mexico, Utah and Wyoming but illegal in Arizona, Florida, Idaho, Kansas, Maine, Minnesota, Massachusetts, Oklahoma, Oregon, Texas, Vermont and Wisconsin. The pro-coursing campaign, Stop2110 says that open field coursing is legal in all US states with a huntable population of jackrabbits. Washington state lists jackrabbits as a protected species, due to an unusually low population for a western state, and bans all forms of hunting them.

During the 2006–07 coursing season, the leading United States coursing body, the National Open Field Coursing Association, registered 480 dogs of various breeds, and oversaw 83 coursing events. Its quarry is the black-tailed jackrabbit. Coursing of white-tailed jackrabbits is organised by a smaller body, the North American Coursing Association.

=== Variations in other countries ===
According to the UK Government review, the Burns Inquiry (published in 2000), hare coursing was taking place in Pakistan, Portugal and Spain. Pakistan has officially prohibited the use of dogs or hawks for coursing unless a special licence is issued for carrying out such activity although, according to some reports, hare coursing is still practised and popular. Hare coursing in Portugal is run in both forms: open (Prova de Galgos a Campo), and closed (park) coursing where it is known as lebre a corricão. Hare coursing in Portugal may only be legally undertaken with two dogs and operates under the same ethos as coursing in the United States. In Spain, the hare coursing is open coursing, and the areas where the activity takes place includes the Medinrua area. Coursing has long been undertaken in Spain, where Spanish galgos rather than greyhounds are used. These dogs have a precarious life after their coursing careers, with World Animal Protection suggesting that many tens of thousands die cruelly each year. Hare coursing also takes place in Russia but is illegal in most European countries and in Australia, where it had a long history from 1867 until it was banned in 1985 following a long decline in popularity.

== Controversy ==
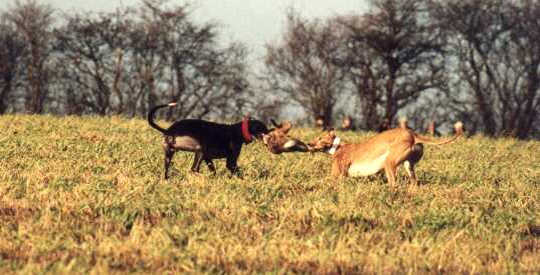
A hare caught by two greyhounds

As long ago as 1516, Thomas More wrote in Utopia that,

Thou shouldst rather be moved with pity to see a silly innocent hare murdered of a dog, the weak of the stronger, the fearful of the fierce, the innocent of the cruel and unmerciful. Therefore, all this exercise of hunting is a thing unworthy to be used of free men.

Coursing has long sparked opposition from activists concerned about animal welfare. In 1892, Lady Florence Dixie criticised hare coursing as an "aggravated form of torture" and the League Against Cruel Sports was established in 1924 to campaign against rabbit coursing on Morden Common and continues to believe that it is wrong to expose animals to the risk of injury or death for human entertainment. The Waterloo Cup became a centrepiece of the campaign against coursing in the UK. In opposition, coursing has long enjoyed the fame of being known as "the noblest of field sports" precisely because the death of the hare is not the aim of the sport. Under most regulated forms of coursing only two hounds pursue the hare, the dogs competing against each other for a short time, and allowing the hare a significant chance of escape.

=== Welfare arguments ===
Until the 1970s, there was a dearth of scientific evidence on the welfare impact of coursing. The first thorough study was carried out in 1977–79 by the Universities Federation for Animal Welfare (UFAW), but it said that it was "not easy to draw conclusions from these reports". According to a review of this study conducted for the Burns Inquiry, "Of the 53 hares killed, 43 had neck injuries, 18 of which were inflicted by the handler (as evidenced from a clean break and no teeth marks). No clean breaks were believed to have been caused by dogs (where tooth marks were evident). The UFAW team's assessment was that all chest injuries would have been quickly fatal (in six cases these included a punctured heart); 10 animals without neck injuries had chest injuries. Abdominal injuries included six punctured livers, but generally involved a ruptured gut. In the UFAW team's opinion, hindleg and back injuries could have been extremely painful until chest or neck injuries were inflicted".

The Burns Inquiry, set up by the UK Government to examine hunting with dogs in England and Wales, which included coursing, concluded that "We are ... satisfied that being pursued, caught and killed by dogs during coursing seriously compromises the welfare of the hare. It is clear, moreover, that, if the dog or dogs catch the hare, they do not always kill it quickly. There can also sometimes be a significant delay, in driven coursing, before the picker-up reaches the hare and dispatches it (if it is not already dead). In the case of walked-up coursing, the delay is likely to be even longer".

=== Welfare arguments in Irish-style coursing ===
Since the introduction of muzzling for greyhounds in 1993, deaths to hares are less common, falling from an average of 16% to about 4% of hares coursed (reducing to around 150–200 hares per year). Muzzled dogs are more likely to buffet a hare than to bite it, a factor that may still affect the hare's subsequent survival. Hares can either die due to injuries sustained by contact with the much larger dogs or due to capture myopathy. The report from the official Countryside ranger at the Wexford Coursing Club meeting in December 2003 confirms that, exceptionally, 40 hares died at the event and the report of the veterinary surgeon who examined the hares blames the "significant stress" of being "corralled and coursed". Coursing supporters deny that hare coursing is cruel and say that hares that are injured, pregnant or ill are not allowed to run. Hares are reported to be examined by a vet before and after racing.

In the context of open (not park) coursing, the (British) National Coursing Club evidence to the Burns Inquiry said that muzzled coursing can cause more suffering than unmuzzled if the coursing officials are not able to reach injured hares quickly. The Irish Council Against Bloodsports, an organisation that campaigns against hare coursing has video evidence that shows this happening, even in enclosed coursing.

=== The kill ===
In 2000, the rules of the UK National Coursing Club awarded a point to a greyhound that killed a hare "through superior dash and speed". By early 2003, this rule had been deleted to remove the appearance of the kill incentive. Observers of hare coursing at the Waterloo Cup – the most important event in the UK coursing calendar until it was last held in 2005 – regularly reported a minority of people in the crowd cheering when hares were killed. In 2005 in the US, points were still awarded for a "touch ... where the quarry is captured or killed".

The number of hares killed in coursing is unclear. The UK government's Burns Inquiry which submitted its final report in 2000 said that about 250 hares were killed each year in formal coursing. although much larger numbers of kills are believed to take place in informal coursing. The UK National Coursing Club and the organisers of the now defunct Waterloo Cup said that, on average, one in seven or eight hares coursed were killed. Inspectors from the Royal Society for the Prevention of Cruelty to Animals who attended the event estimated that a greater number, one in five hares coursed, was killed.

During the 2013 season, the Irish National Parks and Wildlife Service oversaw 23 hare coursing meetings. Over 100 hares "required assistance" after being struck during races, which led to over 20 of them dying of natural causes or having to be euthanised.

== Conservation or pest control ==
In different parts of the world two contrasting arguments are made in favour of hare coursing. In some places, the high densities of hare leads to the animals being considered as agricultural pests – a view taken, for example, by the California Department of Agriculture. Coursing is sometimes defended on this basis, even though the US Bureau of Sport Fisheries and Wildlife has said that coursing does not "reduce the population enough to alleviate damage".

Elsewhere, such as in the UK, hares are not always seen as pests, and there are species action plans aiming to significantly increase their numbers. Some coursers say that coursing assists conservation because it leads to sporting landowners creating a habitat suitable for hares. Opponents of coursing say that the converse is true, namely that coursing takes place where hares live rather than hares living where coursing takes place. It is also the case that coursing kills slower hares, and it is said by some coursers that this leaves faster hares to breed and multiply.

== Debate and legislation ==
=== United Kingdom ===
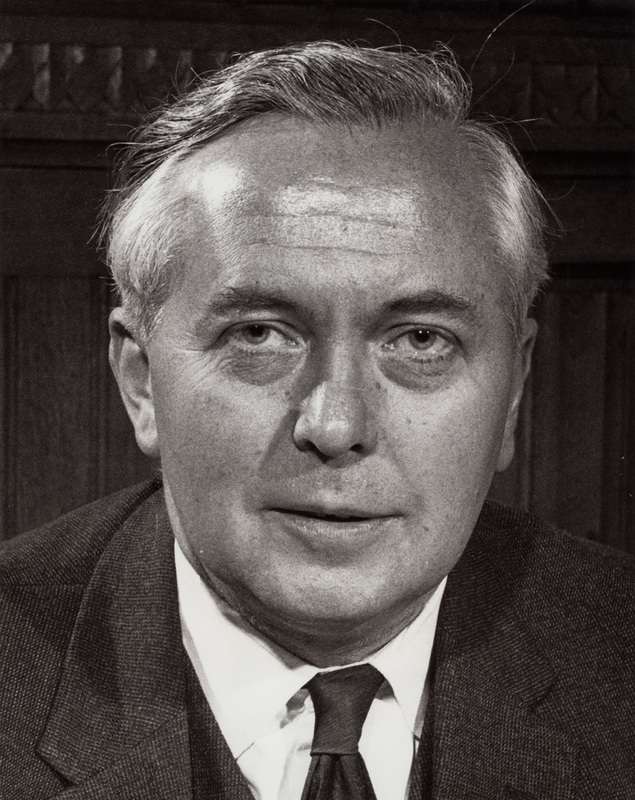
UK Prime Minister Harold Wilson tried and failed to ban hare coursing in 1969 and 1975.

The practice of hare coursing has only recently, in historical terms, been debated in Parliament, although Parliament created an exemption in 1921 from the cruelty legislation, the Protection of Animals Act 1911, for animals released for coursing. Eric Heffer, MP for Liverpool Walton, was a major opponent of coursing in the late 1960s, and Prime Minister Harold Wilson joined in the criticism.

Under Wilson's premiership, the House of Commons voted for Government Bills to ban hare coursing in 1969 and 1975, but neither passed the House of Lords to become law. In 2002, the Scottish Parliament passed the Protection of Wild Mammals (Scotland) Act, which banned hare coursing in Scotland. In 2004 the British Parliament passed the Hunting Act, which banned hare coursing as well as other forms of hunting with hounds with effect from 18 February 2005. Prosecutions were successful against two hare coursers in 2008 and against two Yorkshire landowners in 2009. The private prosecution brought against the organisers of the March 2007 North Yorkshire event organised by a Field Trialling Club clarified in September 2009 that hare coursing is still an illegal activity under the Hunting Act 2004 even if the dogs used are muzzled.

No formal coursing has taken place in Northern Ireland since 2002, as Ministers have refused the coursing clubs permission to net hares, and have protected them from being coursed or hunted under the Game Preservation (Northern Ireland) Act and in June 2010 the Northern Ireland Assembly voted to ban the practice. The two extant Northern Ireland coursing clubs since 2002 have travelled to the Republic to hold meetings jointly with coursing clubs there. Opinion polls commissioned by the League Against Cruel Sports as part of its campaigning have shown very strong public opposition to hare coursing from both urban and rural residents of Northern Ireland (and the Republic of Ireland).

In 2015, it was reported that hare coursing incidents had fallen by approximately 78 per cent across Suffolk since the re-launch of an operation against coursing in September 2013.

=== United States ===
==== California ====
In early 2006, the TV channel ABC 7 showed a film of coursing with sets of three greyhounds competing in the chase of a number of hares. Coursing was banned in the County concerned, and California Assemblywoman Loni Hancock promoted a bill, AB2110, to make it a crime for any person in California to engage in open field coursing – defined as a "competition in which dogs are, by the use of rabbits, hares, or foxes, assessed as to skill in hunting live rabbits, hares, or foxes". A pro-coursing campaign was also established. The Bill was passed by the Public Safety Committee but did not become law.

== See also ==
- Countryside Alliance
- Jackson v Attorney General
- League Against Cruel Sports
- Rabbiting
