= Coursing =

Hunting method and dog sport

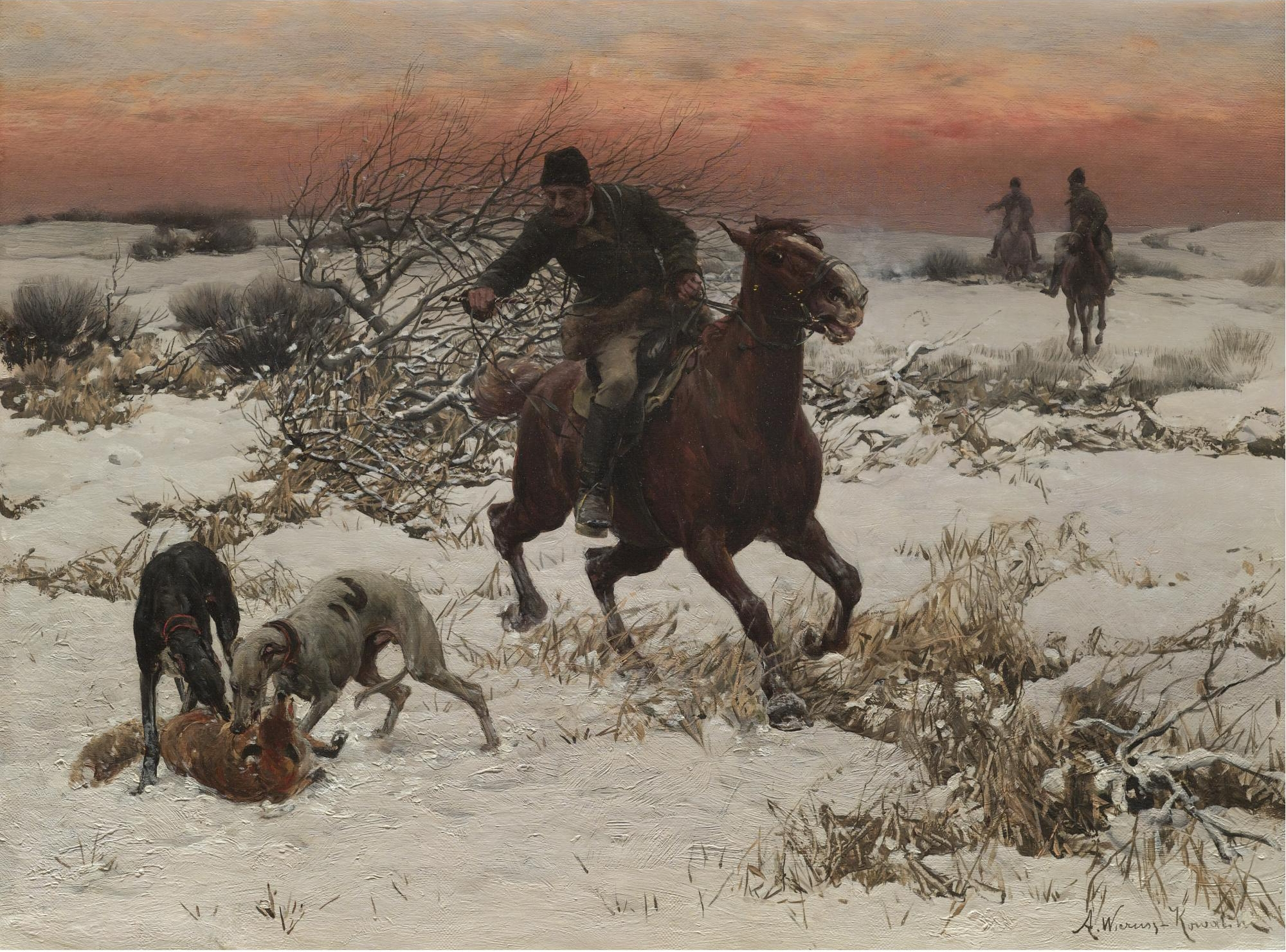
The Hunter, oil on canvas, Alfred Kowalski

Coursing by humans is the pursuit and capture of game or other animals by dogs—chiefly greyhounds and other sighthounds—that outrun their prey, tracking it by sight rather than scent. Coursing was once a common hunting technique, practised by the nobility, the landed, and the wealthy, as well as by commoners with sighthounds and lurchers. In its oldest recorded form in the Western world, as described by Arrian, it was a sport practised by all levels of society, and it remained so until Carolingian period forest law appropriated hunting grounds, or commons, for the king, the nobility, and other landowners. It then became a formalised competition, specifically on hare in Britain, practised under rules, the Laws of the Leash.

As a zoological term, coursing refers to predation by the running down of prey over long distances, as opposed to stalking, in which a stealthy approach is followed by a short burst of sprinting, or ambush, the sudden capture by surprise of unsuspecting prey. Though humans still course prey, the term is normally reserved for predation by non-human predators.

== Sport and hunting ==
Animals coursed in hunting and sport include hares, foxes, deer of all sorts, antelope, gazelle, jackals, wolves. Jackrabbits and coyotes are the most common animals coursed in the United States. Competitive coursing in Ireland, the UK (until prohibition in 2004), Portugal and Spain has two dogs running against each other. In the United States, generally speaking, three dogs are run together.

The Protection of Wild Mammals (Scotland) Act and the Hunting Act 2004 (in England and Wales) made it illegal to hunt any type of mammal with dogs with the exception of rabbits and rats. Dogs are still permitted to chase (flush) game into the path of a waiting gun, as long as no more than two dogs are used.

In Australia, dogs may be used to hunt feral animals such as foxes, deer, goats, rabbits, and pigs.

== See also ==
- Hare coursing
- Greyhound racing
- Lure coursing
- Cheetah and Caracal – two feline species also historically used in similar hunting practices
- Courser (disambiguation)
