= Waterloo Cup =

Hare coursing event

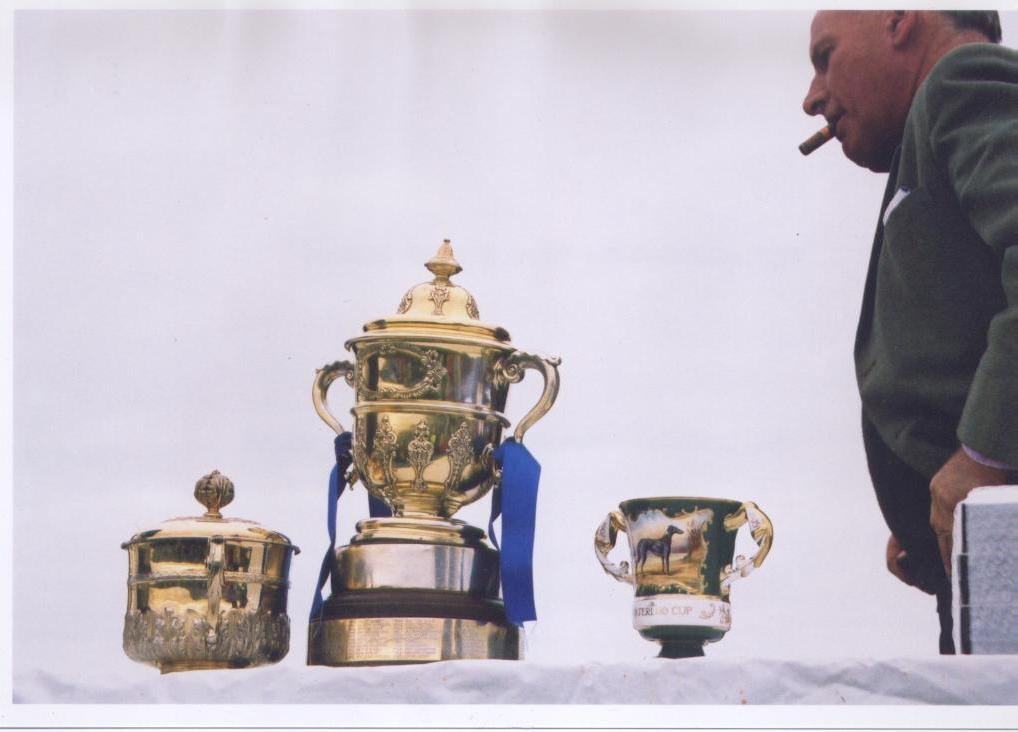
Sir Mark Prescott and the cups, February 2005

The Waterloo Cup was a hare coursing event organised by the National Coursing Club. The three-day event was run annually at Great Altcar in Lancashire, England, from 1836 to 2005 and it used to attract tens of thousands of spectators to watch and gamble on the coursing matches. It was founded by a Liverpool hotelier on land owned by William Molyneux, 2nd Earl of Sefton, who was patron of the event until his death in 1838.

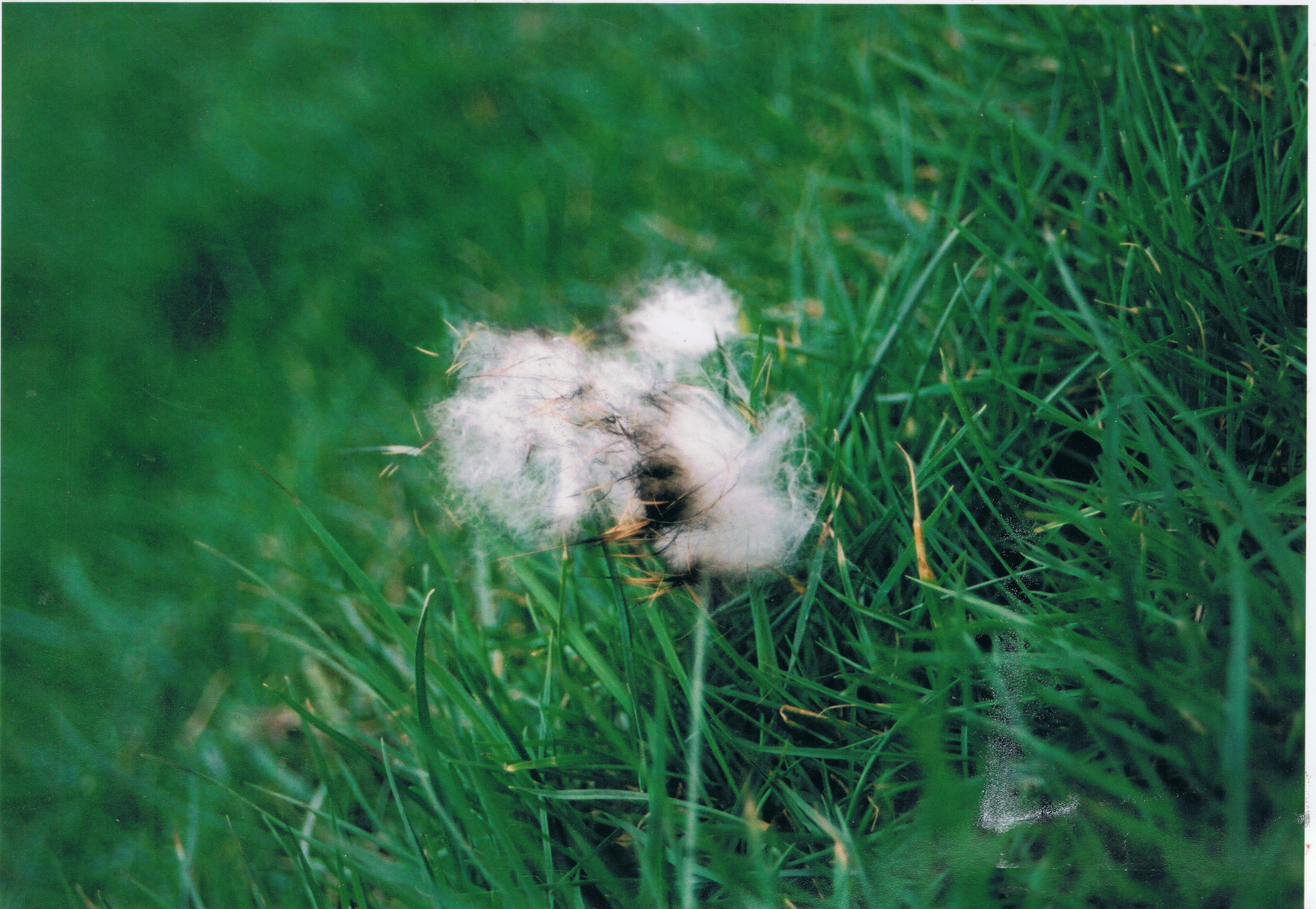
Fleck of hare fur from the last Waterloo Cup meet, February, 2005.

The Waterloo Cup meet was the biggest annual coursing event in the United Kingdom and was often referred to by its supporters as the blue riband event of the coursing year. A hare coursing event of identical name was held in Australia from 1868 to 1985, at which point it became a lure coursing event.

Run as a knock-out tournament between sixty-four coursing greyhounds from Great Britain and Ireland, supporters described the meet as the ultimate test of a greyhound, but opponents of hare coursing, such as the League Against Cruel Sports, saw it as a celebration of cruelty. The Hunting Act 2004, which came into force just after the 2005 cup, made hare coursing events unlawful in England and Wales, and the Waterloo Cup has not taken place since.

== History ==
The Waterloo Cup was the premier event in the coursing calendar and was known as the 'blue ribbon of the leash'. It was inaugurated in 1836 by Mr William Lynn, proprietor of the Waterloo Hotel in Liverpool's Ranelagh Street. Encouraged by the extra trade generated by the Waterloo Cup, the Liverpool entrepreneur turned his attention to the Turf the following year and organised the first running of the Grand Liverpool Steeplechase, known as the Grand National since 1839.

The first winner of the Waterloo Cup was a bitch named Milanie, owned by Lord Molyneux, the eldest son of the Earl of Sefton, on whose land the contest was run on the plains of Altcar. In addition to stakes of £16, Lord Molyneux won a trophy in the form of a silver snuff box.

The first supreme champion in the sport of coursing was Lord Lurgan's greyhound Master McGrath, who won the Waterloo Cup three times, in 1868, 1869, and 1871. The dog became a household name in Britain, and such was his fame that Queen Victoria commanded his appearance at Windsor Castle. Master McGrath set the standard by which all later greyhounds would be judged. The great dog's record was finally eclipsed by Colonel North's greyhound Fullerton who recorded four consecutive victories in the Waterloo Cup between 1889 and 1892.

In later years the event has been championed by Newmarket trainer Sir Mark Prescott.

The 2005 event, held on 14–16 February, was eventually won by a dog called Shashi, bred by Ernest Smith, and owned by him with Albert Shackcloth and Michael Darnell. Trained at Malton, North Yorkshire, by Jonathan Teal, the winner beat Hardy Admiral, owned by Diana Williams, in the final. The event was memorably filmed by Paul Yule for the documentary The Last Waterloo Cup, subsequently shown on the BBC.

== Past winners ==
Year	Winner	Owner
1836	Milanie	Mr William Lynn
1837	Fly	Mr Jebb
1838	Bugle	Mr Ball
1839	Empress	Mr Robinson
1840	Earwig	Mr Easterby
1841	Bloomsbury	Mr King
1842	Priam	Mr Deakin
1843	Major	Mr G Pollok
1844	Speculation	Mr N Slater
1845	Titania	Mr Jebb
1846	Harlequin	Mr Barge
1847	Senate	Charles Molyneux, 3rd Earl of Sefton
1848	Shade	Sir St George Gore, 8th Baronet
1849	Magician	Sir St George Gore, 8th Baronet
1850	Cerito	Mr G F Cooke
1851	Hughie Graham	Mr W Sharpe
1852	Cerito	Mr G F Cooke
1853	Cerito	Mr G F Cooke
1854	Sackcloth	Charles Molyneux, 3rd Earl of Sefton
1855	Judge	Mt T Brocklebank
1856	Protest	Mr J Bakens
1857	King Lear	Mr W Wilson
1858	Neville	Mr S Cass
1859*	Clive	Mr J Jardine
1859*	Selby	Mr Mr J Gordon
1860	Maid of the Mill	Mr J Blackstock
1861	Canaradzo	Mr J Hyslop
1862	Roaring Meg	Mr J Challander
1863	Chloe	Mr T T C Lister
1864	King Death	Mr T Williams
1865	Meg	Colonel Goodlake
1866	Brigadier	Mr Gorton
1867	Lobelia	Mr E W Stocker
1868	Master M'Grath	Charles Brownlow, 2nd Baron Lurgan
1869	Master M'Grath	Charles Brownlow, 2nd Baron Lurgan
1870	Sea Cove (late Covet)	Mr J Spink
1871	Master M'Grath	Charles Brownlow, 2nd Baron Lurgan
1872	Bed of Stone	Mr J Briggs
1873	Muriel	Mr R Jardine
1874	Magnano	Mr C Morgan
1875	Honeymoon	Mr W F Hutchinson
1876	Donald	Mr R M Douglas
1877	Coomassie	Mr R F Wilkins
1878	Coomassie	M H F Stocken
1879	Misterton	Mr H G Miller
1880	Honeywood	Mr R B Carruthers
1881	Princess Dagmar	Mr H G Miller
1882	Snowflight	Mr Ellis
1883	Wild Mint	Mr G J Alexander
1884	Mineral Water	Mr C E Marfleet
1885*	Bit of Fashion	Mr E Dent
1885*	Miss Glendyne	Mr J Hinks
1886	Miss Glendyne	Mr R B Carruthers
1887*	Greater Scot	Mr R F Gladstone
1887*	Herschel	Mr T D Hornby
1888	Burnaby	Mr L Pilkington
1889*	Fullerton	Colonel J T North
1889*	Troughend	Mr J Badger
1890	Fullerton	Colonel J T North
1891	Fullerton	Colonel J T North
1892	Fullerton	Colonel J T North
1893	Character	Mr R L Cotterell
1894	Texture	Count Stroganoff
1895	Thoughtless Beauty	Mr R B Carruthers
1896	Fabulous Fortune	Messrs Fawcett's
1897	Gallant	Mr T P Hale
1898	Wild Night	Mr J Trevor
1899	Black Fury	Mr J B Thompson
1900	Fearless Footsteps	Mr J H Bibby
1901	Fearless Footsteps	Mr J H Bibby
1902	Farndon Ferry	Mr G F Fawcett
1903	Father Flint	Mr J H Bibby
1904	Hornfray	Mr G Darlinson
1905	Pistol II	Mr W H Pawson
1906	Hoprend	Mr H Hardy
1907	Long Span	Sir Robert Jardine, 2nd Baronet
1908	Hallow Eve (late Forest Kitten)	Mr E Hulton
1909	Dendraspis	Messrs. J E & S M Dennis
1910	Heavy Weapon	Mr S Hill-Wood
1911	Jabberwock	Sir Robert Jardine, 2nd Baronet
1912	Tide Time	Mr J W Fullerton
1913	Hung Well	Mr S Hill-Wood
1914	Dilwyn	Mr A P Pope
1915	Winning Number	Sir T Dewar
1916	Harmonicon	Mr E Hulton
1917	No competition	
1918	No competition	
1919+	Jakin	Sir Robert Jardine, 2nd Baronet
1920	Fighting Force	Mr N Dunn
1921	Shortcoming	The Countess of Sefton
1922	Guard's Brigade	Dudley Marjoribanks, 3rd Baron Tweedmouth
1923	Latto	Hugh Lowther, 5th Earl of Lonsdale
1924	Cushey Job	Mr A Gordon Smith
1925	Pentonville	Mr H C Pilkington
1926	Jovial Judge	Mr J l Jarvis
1927	Golden Seal	Mr A Gordon Smith
1928	White Collar	Mrs Sofer Whitburn
1929	Golden Surprise	Mr A Gordon Smith
1930	Church Street	Mr Geo Smith
1931	Conversion	Mr T Cook
1932	Ben Tinto	Mr W Ellis
1933	Genial Nobleman	Mr J L Jarvis
1934	Bryn Truthful	Major H Peel
1935	Dee Rock	Mr J E Dennis
1936	Hand Grenade	Mr J Campbell
1937	Rotten Row	Mr R Rank
1938	Perambulate	Mr H C Pilkington
1939	Delightful Devon	Mr H Dyke
1940	Dee Flint	Mr J E Dennis
1941	Swinging Light	Mr R C Brownlee
1942	Swinging Light	Mr R C Brownlee
1943	Countryman	Mr T Cronoplos
1944	Dutton Swordfish	Mrs J A Dewar
1945	Bryn Tritoma	Miss G A Allen
1946	Maesydd Michael	Mrs S Whitburn
1947	Constable	Mr E Baxter
1948	Noted Sunlight	Mr N Shaw
1949	Life Line	Mr T Holmes
1950	Roving Minstrel	Mrs A Rhodes-Moorhouse
1951	Peter's Poet	Sir Richard G W Burbidge
1952	Dew Whaler	Mr J A Dewar
1953	Holystone Lifelong	Major G A Renwick
1954	Cotton King	Mr T Noble
1955	Full Pete	Major J J Fullerton
1956	Magical Love	Mr T E Murgatroyd
1957	Old Kentucky Minstrel	Mr J Clarke
1958	Holystone Elf	Mr W Proctor-Smith
1959	Mutual Friend	Mr M Forsyth-Forrest
1960	Jonquil	Mrs B Kerr
1961	Dubedoon	Mr A J Morris
1962	Best Champagne	Mr G B Cary
1963	Himalayan Climber	Mr P McAlinden
1964	Latin Lover	Mr L Lucas
1965	Nicelya Head	Mr A H Birtwhistle
1966	Just Better	Mr G R Graham
1967	Haich Bee	Mr P J Duggan
1968	Not Run	
1969	Not Run	
1970	Rooney Magnet	Mr S F Land
1971	So Clever	Hugh Molyneux, 7th Earl of Sefton
1972	Linden Eland	Mr A S Cathcart
1973	Modest Newdown	Mr W Lee
1974	Not Run	
1975	Hardly Ever	Mrs D Ellis
1976	Minnesota Miller	Mr M Sullivan
1977	Minnesota Miller	Mr M Sullivan
1978	Not Run	
1979	Not Run	
1980	Not Run	
1981	Timworth Edward	Lady Turnbull
1982	Play Solo	Mr J N Donaldson
1983	Luda Hussar	Mr W Burton
1984	Tobertelly Queen	Mr W Gaskin
1985	Hear and There	Mr W Gaskin
1986	Not Run	
1987	Mousetail	Mrs J M Collins
1988	React Fraggl	Mr W Gaskin & Miss E Ryan
1989	React Fagan	Mr R Hopper
1990	Sam The Man	Mr D Truelove
1991	Evening Mail	Mrs D Ellis
1992	Johns Mascot	J. Gaskin
1993	Crafty Tessie	S. Guerin
1994	Not Run	
1995	React Robert	T. Ryan
1996	Dashing Oak	P. J. Daly
1997	Teds Move	C.J. Shaw & D. Morgan
1998	Drill the Lads	D.M. Gunter
1999	Judicial Inquiry	D. Flanagan
2000	Suncrest Tina	F. Allen
2001	Not Run (foot and mouth)	
2002	Petite Glory	H. G. Fetherstonhaugh
2003	Henrietta	M. Barry & L. Burke
2004	Why You Monty	A. Condon
2005	Shashi	E. Smith, A Shackcloth & M. Darnell

* Cup divided
+ Substituted event called the Victory Cup

== See also ==
- Master McGrath
