= Charles Wright =

Charles, Charlie or Chuck Wright may refer to:

== Academia and science ==
- Charles Wright (botanist) (1811–1885), American botanist
- Charles Alan Wright (1927–2024), American legal scholar
- C. Conrad Wright (1917–2011), American religious historian
- Charles Henry Conrad Wright (1869–1957), professor of French language and literature
- Charles Romley Alder Wright (1844–1894), English chemistry and physics researcher

== Arts and entertainment ==
=== Music ===
- Charles Wright (musician) (born 1940), leader of Charles Wright & the Watts 103rd Street Rhythm Band
- Specs Wright (Charles Wright, 1927–1963), American jazz drummer
- Chuck Wright (born 1959), American bassist

=== Other media ===
- Charles Wright (novelist) (1932–2008), American novelist
- Charles Wright (poet) (born 1935), American poet

== Politics ==
- Charles Wright (mayor) (1937–1998), American politician, mayor of Davenport, Iowa, from 1977 to 1981
- Charles Ernest Wright, Canadian politician from Ontario
- Charles Frederick Wright (1856–1925), U.S. representative from Pennsylvania
- Charles Ichabod Wright (1828–1905), British member of parliament for Nottingham, 1868–1870
- Charles O. Wright (1873–1922), Canadian politician from Alberta
- Chuck Wright (politician) (1919–2016), American politician, mayor of Topeka, Kansas, from 1965 to 1969

== Sports ==
- The Godfather (wrestler) (born 1961), American professional wrestler born Charles Wright
- Tom White (runner) (Charles Thomas White, 1917–1985), English athlete
- Charles Wright (cricketer) (1863–1936), Nottinghamshire and England cricketer
- Charlie Wright (Kent cricketer) (1895–1959), English cricketer
- Charlie Wright (1938–2024), Scottish football manager and player
- Charles Wright (gridiron football) (born 1964), American player of gridiron football
- Charles Wright (speedway rider) (born 1988), speedway rider

== Others ==
- Charles Barstow Wright (1822–1898), American financier
- Charles Cushing Wright (1704–1857), American medallist and engraver, founding member of the National Academy of Design
- Charles H. Wright (1918–2002), Detroit physician and founder of the Charles H. Wright Museum of African American History
- Charles Henry Hamilton Wright (1836–1909), Irish Anglican clergyman
- C. S. Wright (Charles Seymour Wright, 1887–1975), Canadian Antarctic explorer
- Charles T. Wright (1911–1980), associate justice of the Washington Supreme Court
- Charles Theodore Hagberg Wright (1862–1940), English librarian
- Charles Wright (architect), Australian architect

== See also ==
- Charles Wright & the Watts 103rd Street Rhythm Band, an American soul and funk band formed in the early 1960s
- Mandatory (typeface), a typeface based on another typeface with the name Charles Wright
