= Edith Brower =

- Born: August 24, 1848; New Orleans, Louisiana, U.S.
- Died: September 16, 1931 (aged 83); Wilkes-Barre, Pennsylvania
- Occupations: Author; Journalist; Music and literary critic
- Known for: Founder of the Wyoming Valley Women's Club (1905)

Edith Brower (August 24, 1848 – September 16, 1931) was a Progressive Era American reformer who lived in Wilkes-Barre, Pennsylvania. Edith Brower became a music and literary critic, and contributed arts columns to The Atlantic Monthly and Harper's Weekly.

== Biography ==
Edith Brower was born in New Orleans, Louisiana, August 24, 1848.

She founded the Wyoming Valley Woman's Club, serving as its first president, in 1905, which still exists today. Bower is well known for her memoir, Little Old Wilkes-Barre as i Knew It, (1923) as well as her correspondence with Pulitzer Prize-winning poet Edwin Arlington Robinson.

Brower, an advocate for Women's suffrage, responded to a piece published by The New York Times that was written by Almroth Wright. Wright opposed the movement, saying that women's brains were different from men's, preventing them from being able to adequately deal with social issues. In her letter to the editor, published in the Times on October 23, 1923, she "assails" Wright's views. That letter to the editor was one of many, as described in the Introduction to the book, Edwin Arlington Robinson's Letters to Edith Bower, Bower is described as:

"A feminist who nevertheless retained her feminine qualities, she articulately endorsed woman suffrage...A relentless writer of letters to the editor..."

After her death, a tribute to Brower summarized her determination to pursue women's rights, in one sentence; "At a time when the convention was that women should hold silence, she was not silent."

The City of Wilkes-Barre placed a plaque, memorializing Brower, on the River Common across from the old clubhouse of the Wyoming Valley's Women Club, in 1984.

== Selected works ==
=== Books ===
- The remainder man, Peter Economy, 19--. Originally published in Two Tales: Boston, 1892.
- Little old Wilkes-Barre as I knew it, Fowler, Dick & Walker, 1923.

=== Archived material ===
- Polly's True Boy, University of Michigan: Humanities Text Initiative, Catholic world, Vol. 55, Iss. 330.
- His Dry Sunday, University of Michigan: Humanities Text Initiative, Catholic world, Vol. 62, Iss. 372.
- Treshornish, University of Michigan: Humanities Text Initiative, Overland monthly and Out West magazine, Vol. 17, Iss. 98.
