= Valentine O'Hara =

Irish author

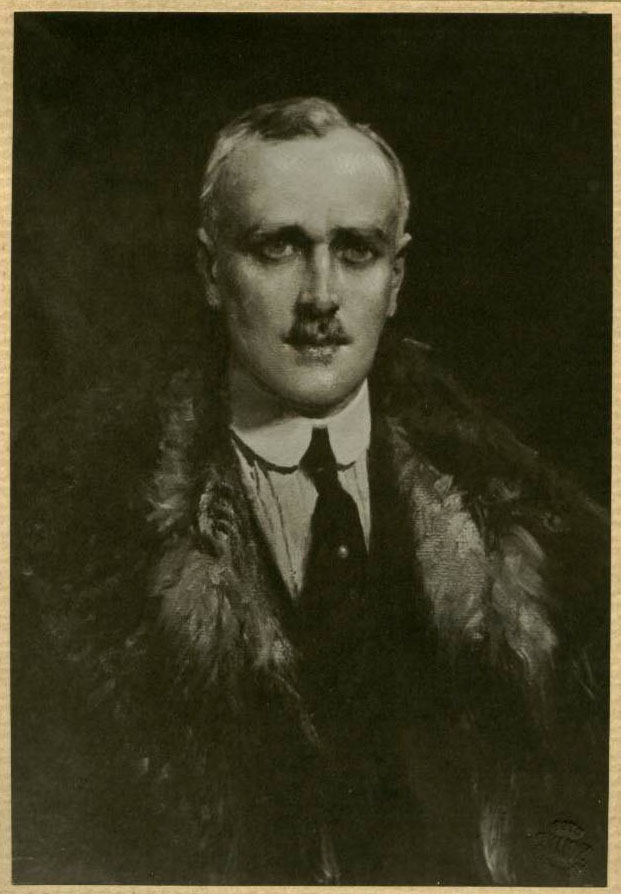
Valentine O'Hara

Valentine James O'Hara (8 February 1875 – 8 October 1941) was a noted Irish author and authority on Russia and the Baltic States in the 1920s.

== Early life ==
Valentine James O'Hara was born on 8 February 1875 in Bernere, Portarlington, County Laois, Ireland. Son of Thomas O'Hara, he had one brother (Charles (1871–1955)) and two sisters (Mary b 1877 and Elizabeth b 1879). His early education was at Stonyhurst College, near Clitheroe in rural Lancashire. He spent two years at Stonyhurst studying Rudiments and Grammar at this Jesuit College. He finished his education at Queen's College, Galway. Ten years later he returned to Stonyhurst College and taught languages before leaving to devote himself to literary work.

== Later career ==
Valentine was a long-term resident of the Russian Empire. He travelled extensively around Europe and served on the Anglo-Russian Committee in Petrograd and the Inter-Allied Trade Commission in Stockholm. He was imprisoned under the Bolshevik regime and left Russia in 1918, later enlisting in the Middlesex Regiment for their North Russian Expedition. He was demobilised in 1919 at the request of the Foreign Office, and was appointed to the British Political Mission to the Baltic States (Estonia, Latvia, and Lithuania).

His two best-known books are Anthony O'Hara, Knight of Malta, an account of a distinguished kinsman, during the writing of which O'Hara had access to the Tyrawley papers at Annaghmore House, near Collooney, County Sligo. He also wrote Russia in 1925 in collaboration with Nikolai Makeev. This was a much-quoted and authoritative history of late 19th-century Russia. He was a frequent contributor to Nineteenth Century, Contemporary, Empire, and National Reviews, Review of Reviews, Studio, among others, and a member of the Press Club, London, E.C.4. He regularly wrote letters to The Times.

On 25 June 1919 he married Florence Annie Butt, daughter of William Butt, a farmer in Ampthill, Bedfordshire. They had no children. He lived the remainder of his life in Kensington and died on 8 October 1941 at Princess Beatrice Hospital, Kensington. The cause of death was pneumonitis of both lungs with cardiac failure. His lengthy obituary in the Stonyhurst College Magazine (July 1943) states: "He was the donor to Stonyhurst of a collection of valuable books, and it was through him that the late Mr. Hamilton Minchin gave us his large collection of books on art in 1933. Mr. O'Hara was also the donor of the unique painting of King Edward VIII in Coronation robes."

O'Hara has an entry in the British Biographical Index reprinted from the Catholic Who's Who and Year Book 1930.

== Bibliography ==
=== Books and general articles ===
- Esthonia: past and present. 1922.
- The Lithuanian Forest. 1922.
- The Foreign Office And Lithuania. Contemporary Review, Vol. 125 (June 1924): 745-752.
- Russia pp. xii. 346. Ernest Benn: London, 1925. In collaboration with Nikolai MAKEEV.
- Anthony O'Hara, Knight of Malta, Memoir of a Russian Diehard, pp. xii. 228. Richards: London, 1938.
- An historical sketch on Poland, 1863-1923, by Valentine J. O’Hara. pp. xix. 441. T. Fisher Unwin: London, 1923. contained within Poland by William Richard MORFILL

=== Oxford Journal articles ===
- The Lithuanian Bison: A Dying Race - 1921; S12-Ix: 509 - 510.
- Lazenki Palace, Warsaw: Latin Inscriptions - 1922; S12-X: 151.
- The English "H": Celtic, Latn And German Influences - 1922; S12-X: 32.
- Inscriptions On An Icon - 1922; S12-X: 117 - 118.
- Use Of "At" Or "In" With Placenames - 1922; S12-X: 234 - 235.
- ‘A Literary Find’ - 1922; S12-X: 487 - 488.
- English Travellers' References To Carrara - 1923; S13-I: 152 - 153.
- Inscriptions On Misericord Seats In Whalley Parish Church - 1923; S13-I: 31.
- Ct. Pietro Verri - 1923; S13-I: 153.
- Roodlofts - 1923; S13-I: 235.
- Lillingstone Dayrell, Ancient Monumental Brass - 1923; S13-I: 252.
- Heraldic Beasts - 1925; Cxlix: 369.
- Religion And Common Speech - 1926; Cl: 117.
- Pierre De Coulevain - 1930; 158: 331.
- Order Of The Holy Sepulchre - 1932; Clxiii: 207.
- "The Thief Of Touchino" - 1934; Clxvi: 316.
- Lazenki Palace, Warsaw: Latin Inscriptions - published posthumously 1965; 12: 151.
