= Almroth Wright =

British microbiologist and immunologist (1861–1947)

Sir Almroth Wright
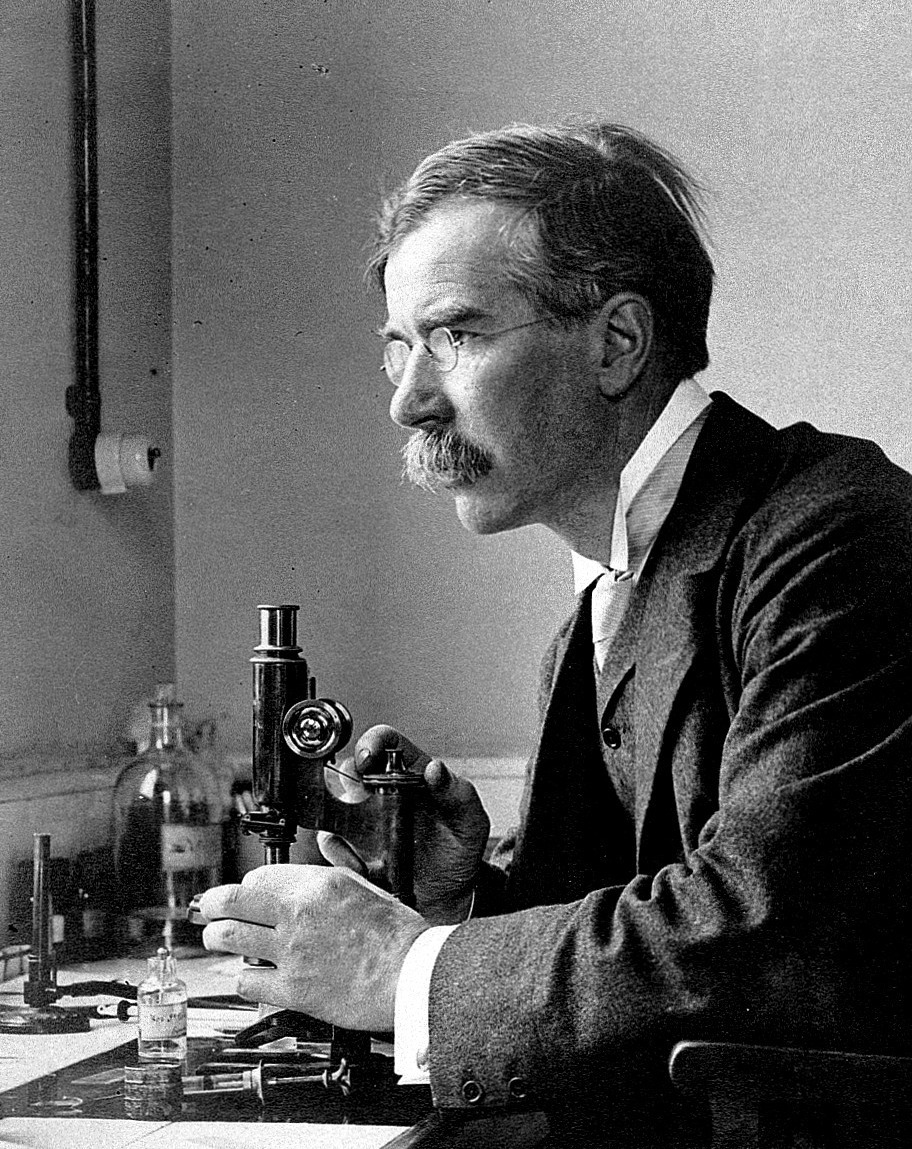
- Wright c. 1900
- Born: 10 August 1861; Middleton Tyas, Yorkshire, England
- Died: 30 April 1947 (aged 85); Farnham Common, Buckinghamshire, England
- Education: Trinity College Dublin
- Known for: vaccination through the use of autogenous vaccines
- Awards: Buchanan Medal (1917); Fellow of the Royal Society
- Scientific career
- Fields: bacteriology immunology
- Workplaces: Netley Hospital; St Mary's Hospital, London

Sir Almroth Edward Wright KBE CB FRCSI FRS (10 August 1861 – 30 April 1947) was an English bacteriologist and immunologist.

He is notable for developing a system of anti-typhoid fever inoculation, recognizing early on that antibiotics would create resistant bacteria, and being a strong advocate for preventive medicine.

== Biography ==
Wright was born at Middleton Tyas, near Richmond, North Yorkshire into a family of mixed Anglo-Irish and Swedish descent. He was the son of Reverend Charles Henry Hamilton Wright, deacon of Middleton Tyas, who later served in Belfast, Dublin, and Liverpool and managed the Protestant Reformation Society. His mother, Ebba Almroth, was the daughter of Nils Wilhelm Almroth, Governor of the Swedish Royal Mint in Stockholm. His younger brother Charles Theodore Hagberg Wright became the librarian of the London Library.

In 1882, he graduated from Trinity College Dublin with first-class honours in modern literature and won a gold medal in modern languages and literature. Simultaneously he took medicine courses and in 1883 graduated in medicine. In the late 19th century, Wright worked with the armed forces of Britain to develop vaccines and promote immunisation.

He married Jane Georgina Wilson (1861–1926) in 1889 and had three children. The first, Edward Robert Mackay Wright (1890–1913), was born in Glebe, Sydney. Second son Leonard Almoth Wilson Wright (1891–1972) was born in Dublin, as was daughter Doris Helena MacNaughton Wright (later Romanes, after whom the Helena Romanes School was named) (1894–1990).

In 1902, Wright started a research department at St Mary's Hospital Medical School in London. He developed a system of anti-typhoid fever inoculation and brought the humoral and cellular theories of immunity together by showing the cooperation of a substance (that he named opsonin) contained in the serum with the phagocytes against pathogens. Citing the example of the Second Boer War, during which many soldiers died from easily preventable diseases, Wright convinced the armed forces that 10 million vaccine doses for the troops in northern France should be produced during World War I. During the same war Wright established a research laboratory attached to the British Expeditionary Force's hospital designated Number 13, General Hospital in Boulogne-sur-Mer. In 1919, Wright returned to St Mary's and remained there until his retirement in 1946. Among the many bacteriologists who followed in Wright's footsteps at St Mary's was Sir Alexander Fleming, who in turn later discovered lysozyme and penicillin. Wright was elected a Fellow of the Royal Society in May 1906. Leonard Colebrook became his assistant in 1907 and continued working with him until 1929.

Wright warned early on that antibiotics would create resistant bacteria, something that has proven an increasing danger. He made his thoughts on preventive medicine influential, stressing preventive measures. Wright's ideas have been re-asserted recently—70 years after his death—by modern researchers in articles in such periodicals as Scientific American. He also argued that microorganisms are vehicles of disease but not its cause, a theory that earned him the nickname "Almroth Wrong" from his opponents. Another derogatory nickname was "Sir Almost Wright".

He also proposed that logic be introduced as a part of medical training, but his idea was never adopted. Wright also pointed out that Pasteur and Fleming, although both excellent researchers, had not managed to find cures for the diseases for which they had sought cures, but instead had stumbled upon cures for totally unrelated diseases.

Wright was a strong proponent of the Ptomaine theory for the cause of Scurvy. The theory was that poorly preserved meats contained alkaloids that were poisonous to humans when consumed. This theory was prevalent when Robert Falcon Scott planned his fateful expedition to the Antarctic in 1911. In 1932, the true cause of the disease was determined to be the deficiency from the diet of a particular nutrient, now called Vitamin C (Ascorbic acid, Scorbic meaning Scurvy).

There is a ward named after him at St Mary's Hospital, Paddington, London.

== Women's suffrage ==
Wright was strongly opposed to women's suffrage. He argued that women's brains were innately different from men's and were not constituted to deal with social and public issues. His arguments were most fully expounded in his book The Unexpurgated Case Against Woman Suffrage (1913). In the book, Wright also vigorously opposes the professional development of women. Rebecca West and May Sinclair both wrote articles criticising Wright's opposition to women's suffrage. Charlotte Perkins Gilman satirised Wright's opposition to women's suffrage in her novel Herland.

== Bernard Shaw ==
Wright was a friend of his fellow Irishman George Bernard Shaw. He was immortalised as Sir Colenso Ridgeon in the play The Doctor's Dilemma written in 1906, which arose from conversations between Shaw and Wright. Shaw credits Wright as the source of his information on medical science: "It will be evident to all experts that my play could not have been written but for the work done by Sir Almroth Wright on the theory and practice of securing immunization from bacterial diseases by the inoculation of vaccines made of their own bacteria." This remark of Shaw's is characteristically ironical. Wright was knighted shortly before the play was written, and Shaw was suspicious of Wright's high reputation (the latter was also known by the nickname Sir Almost Right). The two men met in 1905, and engaged in a long series of robust discussions, involving at one point a challenge from the medical audience that they had "too many patients on our hands already". Shaw's response was to ask what would be done if there was more demand from patients than could be satisfied, and Wright answered: "We should have to consider which life was worth saving." This became the "dilemma" of the play.

Shaw also portrays him in his playlet How These Doctors Love One Another! and uses his theory of bacterial mutation in Too True to Be Good. Shaw, who campaigned for women's suffrage, strongly disagreed with Wright about women's brains and dismissed his views on the subject as absurd.

== Awards ==
Wright had been honoured for his deeds a total of 29 times in his lifetime – a knighthood, 5 honorary doctorates, 5 honorary orders, 6 fellowships (2 honoraries), 4 prizes, 4 memberships, and 3 medals (Buchanan Medal, Fothergill Gold Medal and a special medal "for the best medical work in connection with the war"). He was nominated 14 times for the Nobel prize from 1906 to 1925.

- 1906 Knighthood
- 1906 Fellowship of the Royal Society of London
- 1906 Fellowship of the Royal College of Surgeons of Ireland
- 1906 Honorary D.Sc., Dublin University
- 1908 The Fothergill Gold Medal, presented by the Medical Society of London
- 1912 The Freedom of the City of Belfast
- 1913 The Hungarian Prize, presented by the International Congress in London
- 1915 Companion of the Order of the Bath
- 1915 The Le Conte Prize (50,000 francs), presented by Institute of France
- 1915 The Belgian Ordre de la Couronne
- 1916 Associate Membership of the Paris Academie de Medicine
- 1917 The Buchanan Medal, presented by the Royal Society of London
- 1918 Elected a Corresponding Member of the Institute of France
- 1918 The Serbian Order of St. Sava (1st Class)
- 1919 Knight Commander of the Order of the British Empire
- 1919 Honorary D.Sc., Leeds University
- 1919 Honorary Fellowship, Royal Society of Medicine, London
- 1920 A special medal awarded by the Royal Society of Medicine "for the best medical work in connection with the war"
- 1921 Membership Imperial Society of Medicine, Constantinople
- 1921 The Order of Prince Danilo I (1st Class)
- 1924 Doctorate of the University of Paris
- 1927 Honorary LL.D. of Edinburgh University and Queen's University
- 1927 Honorary Membership of the Viennese Society of Microbiology
- 1931 Honorary Fellowship of Trinity College Dublin
- 1931 Honorary Doctorate of Medicine, the University of Buenos Aires
- 1932 Fellowship of the Royal College of Physicians of Ireland
- 1932 The Stewart Prize, awarded by the British Medical Association
- 1938 Fellowship of the Royal College of Physicians of England

== Works ==
Wright's work could be split up into the following three phases

- Early phase (1891–1910) – over 20 medical journal publications, lectures for students and other scientific works
  - Upon a new septic (1891)
  - On the conditions which determine the distribution of the coagulation (1891)
  - A new method of blood transfusion (1891)
  - Grocers' research scholarship lectures (1891)
  - Lecture on tissue- or cell-fibrinogen (1892)
  - On the leucocytes of peptone and other varieties of liquid extravascular blood (1893)
  - On Haffkine's method of vaccination against Asiatic cholera (1893, coauthored with D. Bruce)
  - Remarks on methods of increasing and diminishing the coagulability of the blood (1894)
  - On the association of serious haemorrhages (1896)
  - A suggestion as to the possible cause of the corona observed in certain after images (1897)
  - On the application of the serum test to the differential diagnosis of typhoid and Malta fever (1897)
  - Remarks on vaccination against typhoid fever (1897, coauthored with D. Semple)
  - An experimental investigation on the role of the blood fluids in connection with phagocytosis (1903, coauthored with Stewart Rankin Douglas)
  - On the action exerted upon the tubercle bacillus by human blood fluids (1904, coauthored with Stewart Rankin Douglas)
  - A short treatise on anti-typhoid inoculation (1904)
  - On the possibility of determining the presence or absence of tubercular infection (1906, coauthored with S. T. Reid)
  - On spontaneous phagocytosis (1906, coauthored with S. T. Reid)
  - Studies on immunisation and their application to the diagnosis and treatment of bacterial infections (1909)
  - Vaccine therapy—its administration, value, and limitations (1910)
  - Introduction to vaccine therapy (1920)
- War phases (1914–1918 and 1941–1945) – mostly works about wounds, wound infections and new perspectives on the topic
  - Wound infections and some new methods (1915)
  - Conditions which govern the growth of the bacillus of "Gas Gangrene" (1917)
  - Pathology and Treatment of War Wounds (1942)
  - Researches in Clinical Physiology (1943)
  - Studies on Immunization (2 vol., 1943–1944)
- Philosophy phase (1918–1941 and 1945–1947) – more or less philosophic works, including thoughts on logic, equality, science and scientific methods
  - The Unexpurgated Case against Woman Suffrage (1913)
  - The Conditions of Medical Research (1920)
  - Alethetropic Logic: a posthumous work (1953, presented by Giles J. Romanes)
- Handbooks
  - Principles of microscopy: being a handbook to the microscope (1906)
  - Technique of the teat and capillary glass tube (1912)

== Bibliography ==
- Walker, N M (March 2007), "Edward Almroth Wright", Journal of the Royal Army Medical Corps, vol. 153, no. 1, pp. 16–7, doi:10.1136/jramc-153-01-05, PMID 17575871, S2CID 28405915
- Stone, Marvin J (2007), "The reserves of life: William Osler versus Almroth Wright", Journal of Medical Biography, vol. 15, no. Suppl 1, pp. 28–31, doi:10.1258/j.jmb.2007.s-1-06-06, PMID 17356738
- Diggins, Francis (December 2002), "Who was...Almroth Wright?", Biologist (London, England), vol. 49, no. 6, pp. 280–2, PMID 12486306
- Matthews, J Rosser (2002), "Almroth Wright, vaccine therapy, and British biometrics: disciplinary expertise versus statistical objectivity", The Road to Medical Statistics, Clio Medica (Amsterdam, Netherlands), vol. 67, pp. 125–47, doi:10.1163/9789004333512_006, ISBN 9789042012080, PMID 12215201
- Worboys, M (1999), "Almroth Wright at Netley: Modern Medicine and the Military in Britain, 1892-1902", Medicine and Modern Warfare, Clio Medica (Amsterdam, Netherlands), vol. 55, pp. 77–97, doi:10.1163/9789004333277_004, ISBN 9789042005464, PMID 10631532
- Baron, J H (July 1997), "Scurvy, Lancaster, Lind, Scott and Almroth Wright", Journal of the Royal Society of Medicine, vol. 90, no. 7, p. 415, doi:10.1177/014107689709000726, PMC 1296402, PMID 9290433
- Meynell, E W (February 1996), "Some account of the British military hospitals of World War I at Etaples, in the orbit of Sir Almroth Wright", Journal of the Royal Army Medical Corps, vol. 142, no. 1, pp. 43–7, doi:10.1136/jramc-142-01-09, PMID 8667330
- Matthews, J R (1995), "Major Greenwood versus Almroth Wright: contrasting visions of "scientific" medicine in Edwardian Britain", Bulletin of the History of Medicine, vol. 69, no. 1, pp. 30–43, PMID 7711458
- Turk, J L (October 1994), "Almroth Wright—phagocytosis and opsonization", Journal of the Royal Society of Medicine, vol. 87, no. 10, pp. 576–7, doi:10.1177/014107689408701002, PMC 1294842, PMID 7966100
- Gillespie, W (December 1991), "Paul Ehrlich and Almroth Wright", West of England Medical Journal, vol. 106, no. 4, pp. 107, 118, PMC 5115083, PMID 1820079
- Allison, V D (1974), "Personal recollections of Sir Almroth Wright and Sir Alexander Fleming", The Ulster Medical Journal, vol. 43, no. 2, pp. 89–98, PMC 2385475, PMID 4612919
- Hatcher, J (November 1972), "Sir Almroth Wright; pioneer of humanised cows' milk", Midwives Chronicle, vol. 86, no. 18, p. 356, PMID 4485442
- Fish, W; Cope, Z; Gray, A C (July 1961), "Sir Almroth WRIGHT (1861–1947)", Journal of the Royal Army Medical Corps, vol. 107, pp. 130–6, PMID 13699916
- Colebrook, Leonard (19 September 1953), "Almroth Wright; pioneer in immunology", British Medical Journal, vol. 2, no. 4837, pp. 635–640, doi:10.1136/bmj.2.4837.635, PMC 2029492, PMID 13082064
- The Plato of Praed street: the life and times of Almroth Wright. M.S.Dunnill. RSM Press 2000

== See also ==
- Frederick F. Russell
