= Charles Theodore Hagberg Wright =

Sir Charles Hagberg Wright
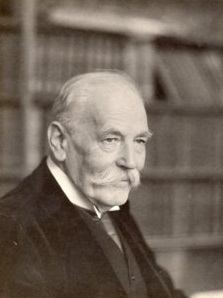
- Born: Charles Theodore Hagberg Wright; 17 November 1862
- Died: 7 March 1940 (aged 77)
- Education: Royal Belfast Academical Institution; Trinity College, Dublin
- Occupation: Librarian

Sir Charles Theodore Hagberg Wright, LL.D. (17 November 1862 – 7 March 1940) was the Secretary and Librarian of the London Library from 1893 until his death. He managed expansion of the library and compiled a comprehensive catalogue of its collection. The Times called him "the guiding genius" of the library, the driving force behind the four decades of its growth. The Library itself hails Wright as "the real architect of the London Library as it is today".

Wright was a highly public person and frequently engaged in political debates. His scholarly interests ranged from the history of the colonization of Africa to translation of Leo Tolstoy. He had a reputation of a liberal russophile and was involved in Russian radical politics and wartime humanitarian aid to Russian soldiers and academics.

== Biography ==
=== Family roots and early years ===
Charles Theodore Hagberg Wright was born on 17 November 1862 in Middleton Tyas, Yorkshire, into a family of mixed Anglo-Irish and Swedish descent. He was the third son of Rev. Charles Henry Hamilton Wright. His father was ordained deacon in 1859; later in life he officiated in Belfast, Dublin and Liverpool and managed the Protestant Reformation Society. His mother was the daughter of Nils Wilhelm Almroth, Governor of the Swedish Royal Mint in Stockholm. His brother Almroth Wright became a prominent bacteriologist and anti-feminist.

Wright was privately educated in Russia, France and Germany, and attended the Royal Belfast Academical Institution and Trinity College in Dublin. In January 1890 he was appointed to the National Library of Ireland and in the following three years catalogued its collection according to the Dewey system. In 1893 he was elected Secretary and Librarian (i.e. chief executive) of the London Library.

=== London Library ===
The London Library acquired the freehold of 14 St James's Square in 1879. In 1896–1898 the premises were completely rebuilt, the library becoming one of the first steel frame buildings in London. Its present-day eclectic facade, Main Hall and Reading Room date back to Wright's time; the library as a whole has been substantially expanded in 1920s, 1930s and 1990s. The library stock grew through purchases and private donations to 250,000 volumes in 1913 and to 400,000 volumes in 1928 (the 500,000 mark was passed in 1950). When notable book collections were slated to be auctioned to foreign buyers, as was the case of Sir Henry Clinton's library, Hagberg publicly rallied to keep them in the country.

Wright's purchases concentrated in the fields of literature and social sciences, particularly the works of British learned societies. Books on general sciences and natural history were (and still remain) scarce, books on medicine and technology nonexistent. In 1920 the library purchased the Allan collection of books on Biblical studies and Reformation, including some incunabula. In the late 1920s Wright disposed of what was then perceived as "minor 19th-century fiction". T. S. Eliot, who was elected President of the library twelve years after Wright's death, said: "I do not believe that there is another library of this size which contains so many books which I might want, and so few of the books which I cannot imagine anyone wanting."

Before Wright, the library's catalogue evolved through annual addenda to its 1842 founding catalogue. The practice was unsatisfactory, and Wright concentrated on producing a proper modern catalogue. The first edition, compiled by Wright and Christopher Purnell, was printed in 1903; the second in 1913–14. It contained 1626 pages; supplementary volumes were printed in 1920 and 1929. The catalogue was arranged in six volumes for the general public and in 38 folio volumes for daily internal use. In addition, Wright published a companion Subject Index (1909, 1923, 1938). His catalogues earned reputation for scrupulous research and attribution of anonymous and pseudonymous publications, and became a standard reference source for British and overseas librarians. His catalogue system forms the foundation of present-day electronic database.

Wright was knighted on 1 January 1934. His greatest desire was to guide the London Library through its centennial in 1941.

=== Public activities ===
In 1901 Wright was the founding member of the African Society and contributed an article on the German colonization of Africa to the first issue of the Journal of the African Society. After the outbreak of World War I Hagberg Wright signed the Reply to German Professors by British Scholars asserting that "we must carry on the war on which we have entered. For us, as for Belgium, it is a war of defense waged for liberty and peace." During the war he was the principal professional adviser to The War Library, which was established in August 1914 to provide books for British servicemen in the front line, rest camps, hospitals and prisoner of war camps. He also campaigned for the establishment of libraries for the Russian prisoners in Germany.

Wright had a reputation of a liberal russophile. He translated works by Leo Tolstoy, and wrote that Tolstoy's greatness "has been obscured from us rather than enhanced by his duality: a realist who strove to demolish the mysticism of Christianity and became himself a mystic in the contemplation of Nature." In 1908 Wright personally presented Tolstoy a letter signed by more than 700 English admirers. Wright noted Tolstoy's "apparent serenity" but did not mention his aversion to public events. Tolstoy lamented in his diary: "At this advanced age, when there is nothing left to think about but death, they want to bother me with that!". Later, Wright provided legal support to Tolstoy's secretary Vladimir Chertkov and his family after their emigration to England.

Wright welcomed Maxim Gorky, Vladimir Nabokov, Alexey Tolstoy to London and introduced them to English writers and publishers of his circle. He was an important figure of the Anglo-Russian Committee, an organization that regularly exposed Russian political troubles to the British public. Before World War I he actively engaged in radical Russian politics. In 1908 Wright, Henry Nevinson, and Peter Kropotkin campaigned to raise money for the escape of Russian revolutionary Maria Spiridonova, who was serving life sentence for a murder. Spiridonova declined the offer and stayed in Siberia. During the Russian Civil War Wright joined the British Committee for Aiding Men of Letters and Science in Russia. He contributed to the publications of primary documents related to the final years of the House of Romanov and the revolutions of 1917.

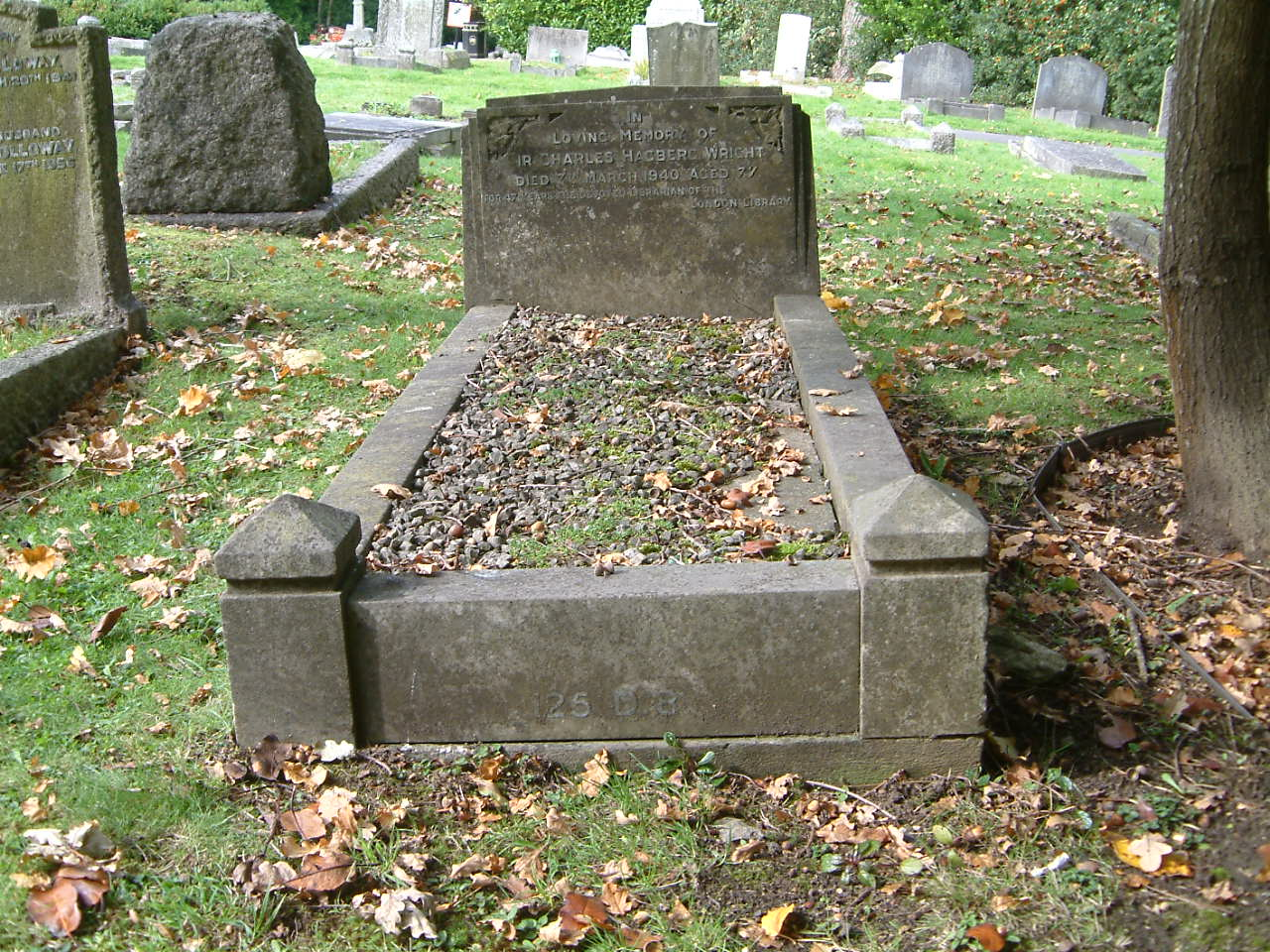
Wright's grave in Mill Hill Cemetery, London

=== Later life ===
At the age of 57, Wright married Constance Metcalfe Tyrrell Lewis (1864–1949), at St Stephen's Church, Gloucester Road, South Kensington, on 20 February 1919. She was the widow of Edward Tyrrell Lewis, born Constance Metcalfe Lockwood, a granddaughter of the architect Henry Francis Lockwood, and half-sister of Priscilla Cecilia, Countess of Annesley. Wright died, aged 77, at home at 6 Westbourne Street, Paddington, on 7 March 1940, and is buried in Mill Hill Cemetery, Paddington. A drawing of him by Rothenstein was donated to the London Library by his step-daughter Dione Tyrrell Lewis in 1963.
