= How These Doctors Love One Another! =

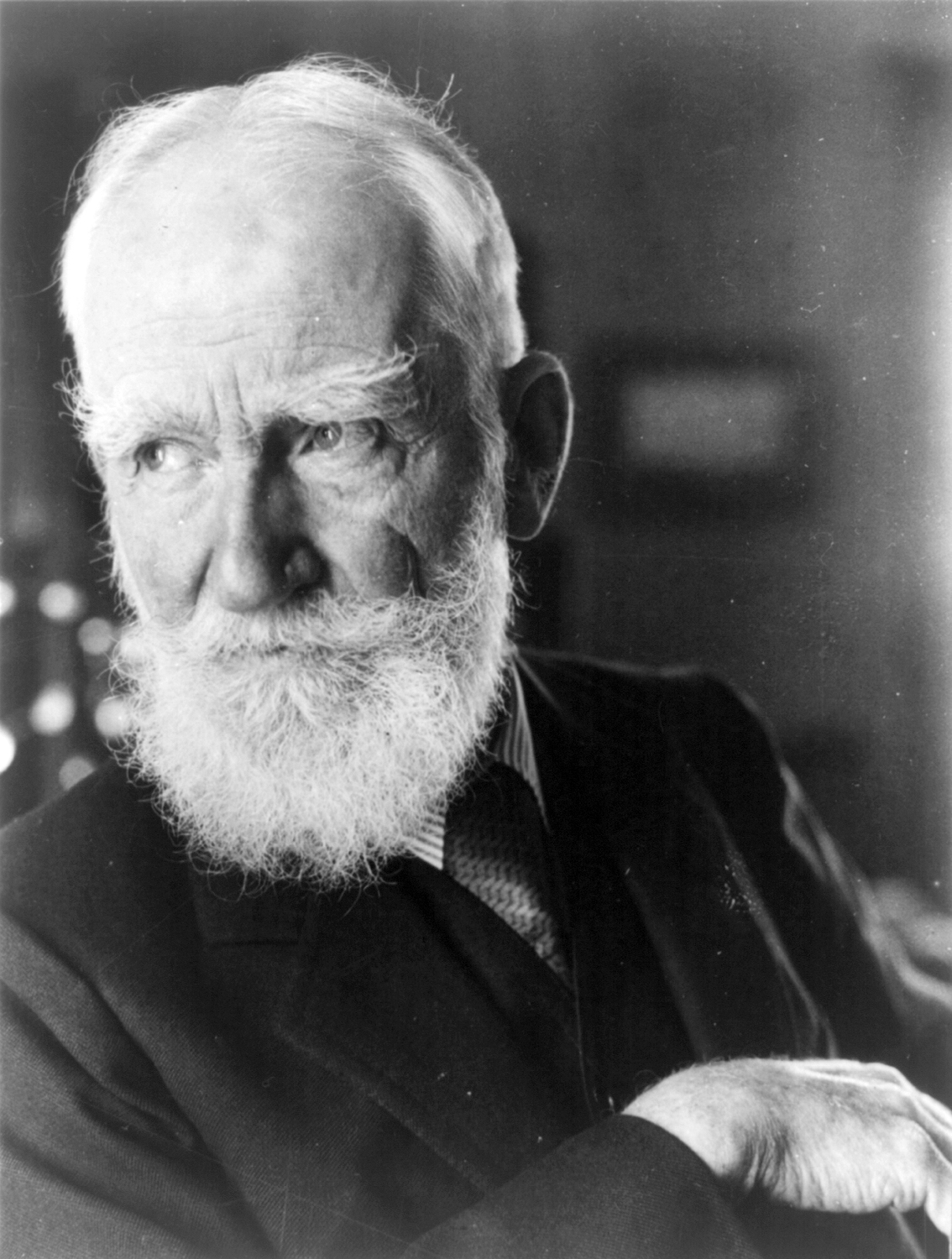
- Written by: George Bernard Shaw
- Original language: English
- Subject: Eminent doctors argue about antiseptics
- Genre: satire

Premiere
- Date premiered: unperformed

How These Doctors Love One Another! is a short playlet written in 1931 by George Bernard Shaw which satirises a dispute between two doctors about the use of antiseptics in surgery. Shaw regularly attacked conventional medicine in his works.

== Content ==
Shaw introduces a dispute between Sir William Watson Cheyne and Sir Almroth Wright. Cheyne and Wright are portrayed ridiculing one another's opinions. He concludes that when doctor's disagree, no-one is harmed, but "when doctors agree we are face to face with a conspiracy of pretentious ignorance with that sordid side of trade unionism which is forced by common need to struggle for its livelihood even to the point of saying, 'Thou shalt die ere I starve'."

== Context ==
Shaw had based his principal character in The Doctor's Dilemma on Wright, but had later come into conflict with him over vaccination, to which Shaw was opposed. He also sparred with Wright over Wright's belief that women's minds were different from men's, a view which Shaw rejected. However, here, Shaw, in line with his own belief in preventive medicine gives much more weight to Wright's views. Wright was concerned that over-use of antiseptics would create resistant strains of bacteria, while Cheyne believed that antiseptics were absolutely necessary.
