= William Jacques =

English book thief and former accountant

William Simon Jacques (born March 1969), nicknamed the "Tome Raider" by the media, is a serial book thief who has been twice convicted after stealing hundreds of rare books worth over £1 million from libraries in the UK. He was jailed in May 2002 for four years, and again in July 2010 for three and a half years.

== Personal life ==
Jacques is the son of a farmer from Cliffe, Selby, North Yorkshire. He studied at the University of Cambridge from October 1987 to 1990, gaining a 2:1 degree in economics from Jesus College, and he is a former chartered accountant who worked with Shell UK. He lived alone in a bed sit in Maida Vale. At his second trial, his lawyer said he was by then an odd-job man who relied on the charity of friends.

== First investigation ==
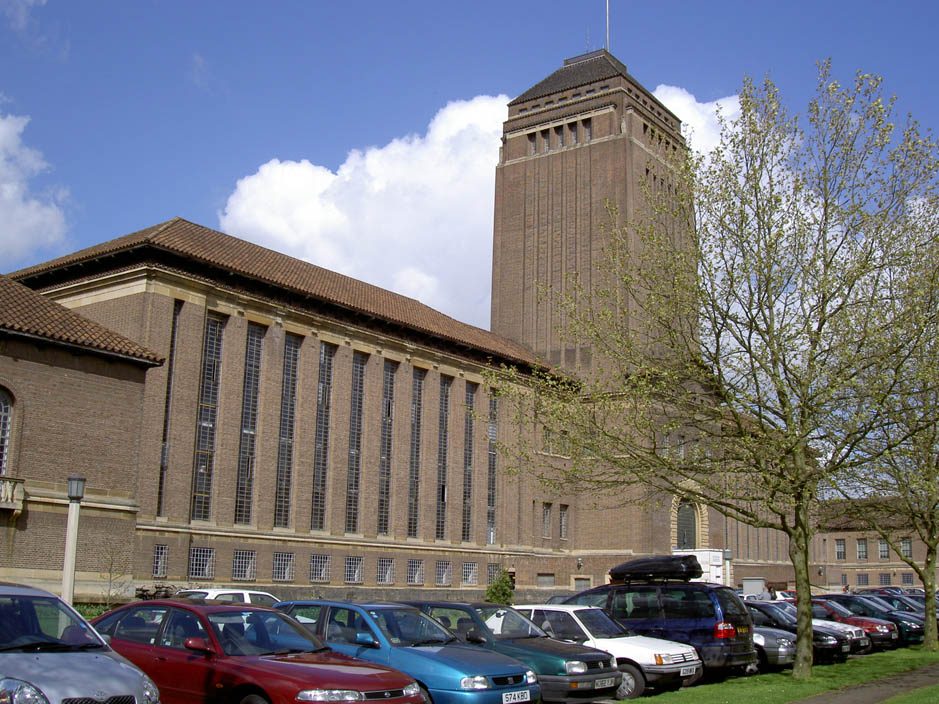
Cambridge University Library

In 1996, Cambridge University Library realised that its two copies of Newton's Principia Mathematica, from the collection of the Bishop of Ely, were missing. The library now says that books began to go missing in the early 1990s. The police interviewed library staff but made no arrests.

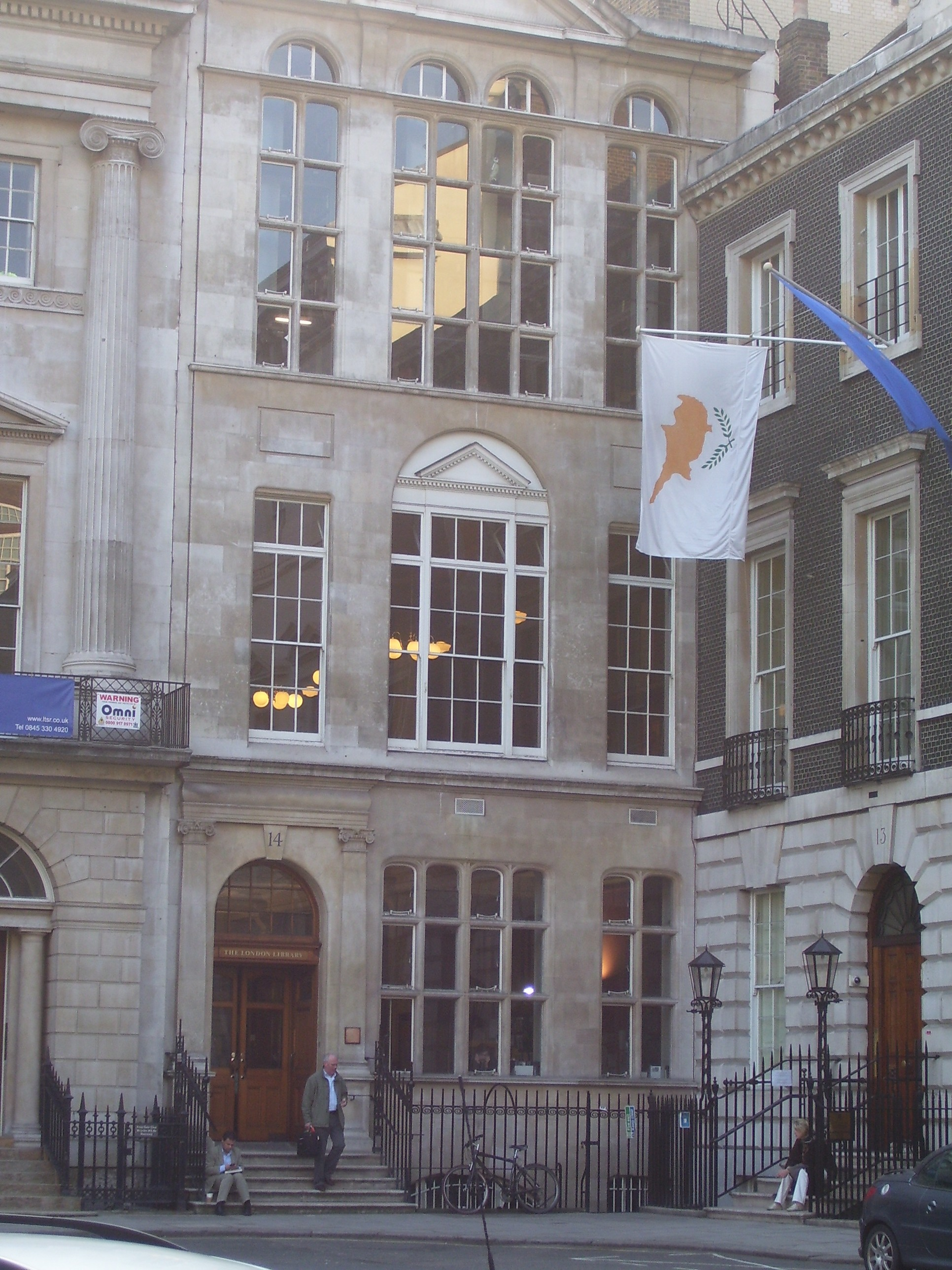
The London Library

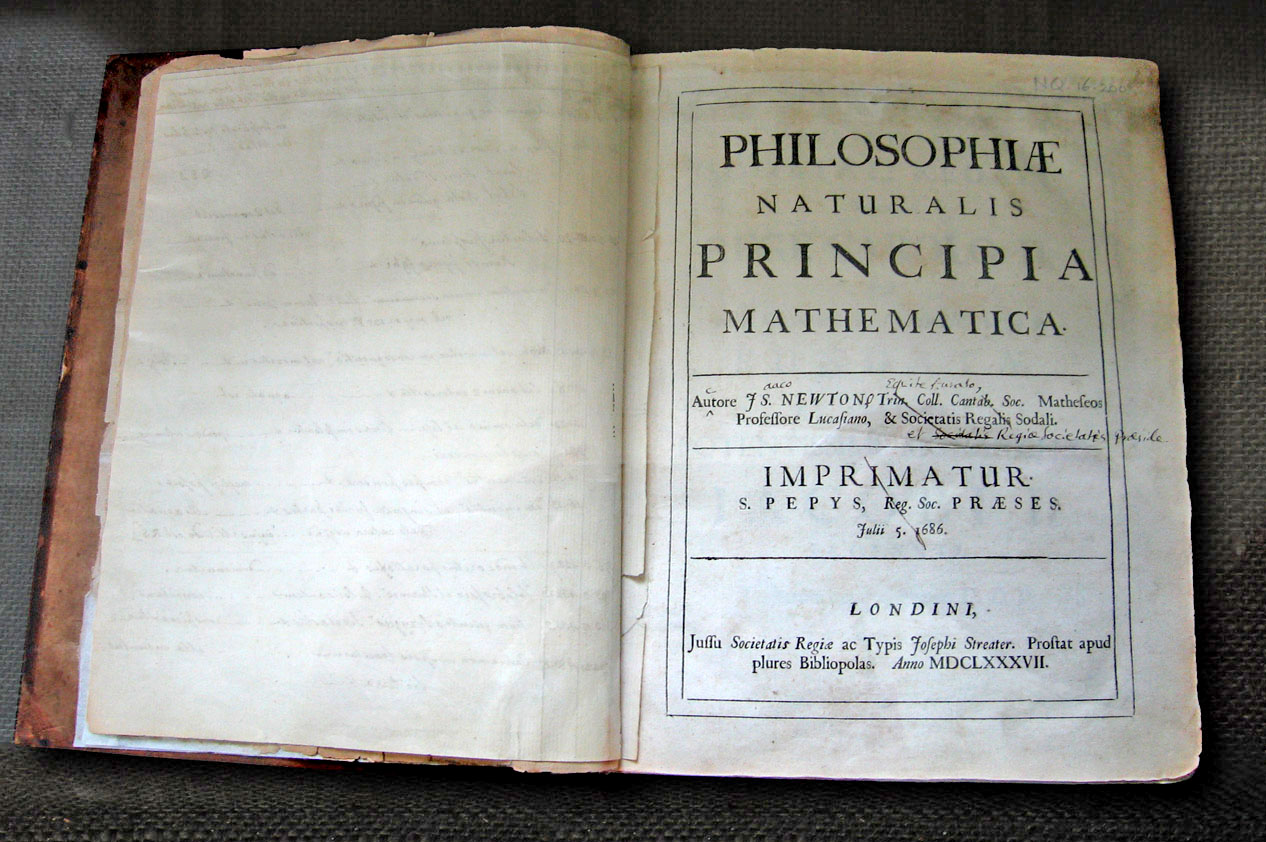
A copy of Newton's Principia Mathematica

In February 1999, a student at LSE bid £120 for a copy of The Pure Logic of Quality by William Jevons in auction at Bloomsbury Book Auctions in London, and took it to Pickering & Chatto, a book dealers. The book dealer, Jolyon Hudson, realised that the book was damaged and appeared to be an ex-library book due to evidence of removed labels. He suspected it was from the London Library, and chief librarian Alan Bell quickly confirmed this. Hudson asked auctioneer Rupert Powell who supplied the book, and he named Jacques, who had been doing business with him since 1992 or 1993. The London Library matched all Jacques' books from that sale as coming from them. Jacques claimed that he bought the books from a middle-aged man at Portobello Market, paying in cash. Jacques then faxed the auction house with terms for his co-operation, including maintaining anonymity.

Cambridgeshire Police opened a case, run by Detective Constable Paul Howitt, and interviewed Jacques in April 1999. Jacques then transferred £360,000 from his London bank, first to Gibraltar and then to Cuba. He resigned from Shell and flew to Cuba, and then sent a letter to the police via his solicitor, listing safety deposit boxes in London, York and Cambridge that contained 64 books. A locker at his work contained more books. Some books were wrapped in newspaper from 1993 and a forgery kit of antique paper, bindings and book covers was found. Jacques flew back to the UK after spending only seven weeks in Cuba and he was arrested, still denying that he had stolen the books.

=== First trial ===
In February 2001 he was charged with 19 counts of theft. After five weeks he was found guilty and jailed. He twice appealed without success. A second trial on two further counts would have taken place in April 2002, but he pleaded guilty. Twelve more charges were left on file. He was jailed at Middlesex Guildhall Crown Court by Judge Derek Inman on 23 May 2002, and ordered to pay £310,000 in compensation.

Books stolen by Jacques by price:

- £180,000 – Sidereus Nuncius, Galileo, 1610
- £100,000 – Principia Mathematica, Newton, 1687 (two copies)
- £65,000 – Astronomia Nova, Kepler, 1609
- £40,000 – An essay on the principle of population, Malthus, 1798
- £28,000 – Dialogo, Galileo, 1632
- £16,000 – Mirifici Logarithmorum Canonis Descriptio, John Napier, 1614
- £15,000 – Traite de la Lumiere, Huygens, 1690
- £14,000 – Tabulae Rudolphinae, Kepler, 1627
- £7,500 – Astronomia Instaurata, Copernicus, 1617
- £2,000 – An inquiry into the nature and causes of the wealth of nations, Adam Smith, 1776

=== Books taken ===
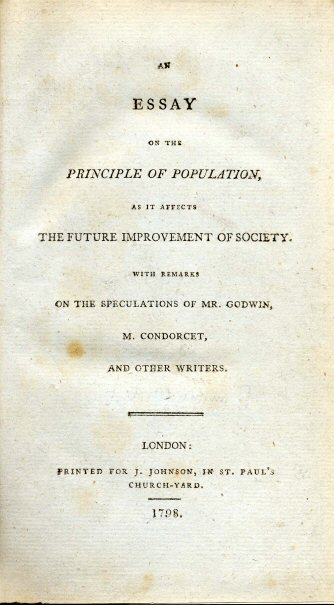
A copy of Thomas Malthus's Essay on Population

Books that Jacques stole include an original of Malthus's Essay on Population, taken from Cambridge University Library and valued at £40,000, and works by Thomas Paine, Galileo and Robert Boyle. The value of the around 412 books that he stole prior to 2002 from Cambridge University Library, the London Library and the British Library is estimated at £1.1 million.

He sold the books through European auction houses, and many were not recovered. Gallerie Gerda Bassenge, Zisska and Kistner in Munich, and Christie's in London all auctioned books from him.

== Second investigation ==
After Jacques was released he visited the British Library in April 2004 wearing a beard, long hair and glasses, but he was recognised and removed.

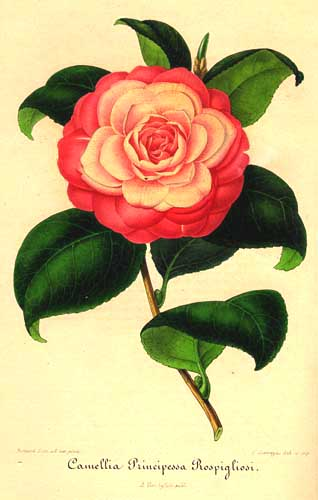
A plate from the Nouvelle Iconographie des Camellias

He began stealing books from the Lindley Library of the Royal Horticultural Society in Pimlico under the name Victor Santoro some time after June 2004, when an inventory was last taken. He also used the pseudonym "David Fletcher". He moved books around to hide the gaps he left when removing books, which he concealed under his tweed jacket. Staff later realised that he signed in when he had both arms free, but never signed out.

In March 2007 he was seen placing a book under his jacket, and when he next visited the library they called the police and he was arrested. Writer Tim Richardson, who witnessed the arrest, said that "the man I saw looked rather anonymous in a cheap blue anorak – which is, perhaps, the most effective look for a book thief." On being searched a list of seventy titles that he had stolen or intended to steal was discovered, which included works by Charles Darwin and Edward Lear. He denied stealing books, saying "I don't know nothing about this. Do you have any evidence for this?" He refused to answer questions or give his name.

He was released on bail in April 2007, and went on the run. He was arrested by North Yorkshire Police on 25 December 2009 at his mother's house in Selby after a tip-off.

=== Second trial ===
Jacques appeared at the City of Westminster Magistrates' Court on 31 December 2009, and the trial took place at Southwark Crown Court. He was given legal aid. Jacques claimed that he was using the books for research purposes and was using a false name due to his prior conviction. After five hours and forty minutes, the jury convicted Jacques 11-1 on 22 June 2010 of theft of the books and going equipped to commit theft with a Senate House library card. His lawyer acknowledged that he showed no remorse, but argued in mitigation that his reputation had been destroyed by his first conviction. He was jailed by Michael Holland QC on 20 July for three-and-a-half years.

=== Books taken in second case ===
Between June 2004 and March 2007 Jacques took thirteen volumes of Nouvelle Iconographie des Camellias by nineteenth-century Belgian author Ambroise Verschaffelt, worth £40,000. The books have not been recovered, although they were insured. Jacques did not reveal his latest address and may have kept books at an unknown location. Confiscation proceedings to recover the books were due to take place in January 2011.

== Impact ==
"What he did was equivalent to daubing paint on the Parthenon"

— Ian DuQuesnay, former college tutor of Jacques, in 2002

Cambridge University Library doubted that Jacques had taken the items himself and suspected a member of staff did. At both Cambridge and London Library, CCTV was introduced and security passes now must be shown. After his 2002 conviction, Jacques was banned from all UK libraries. The Lindley Library says it has improved security and now requires proof of identity. The judge sentencing Jacques in 2010 said that

"The effect of your criminality was to undermine and destroy parts of the cultural heritage that's contained within these libraries and make it more difficult for those who have a legitimate interest in these books to gain access to them because libraries have to take inconvenient and expensive steps to stop thefts of this kind."

== See also ==
- Book collecting
- Document theft
