= Charles Wright (architect) =

Australian architect

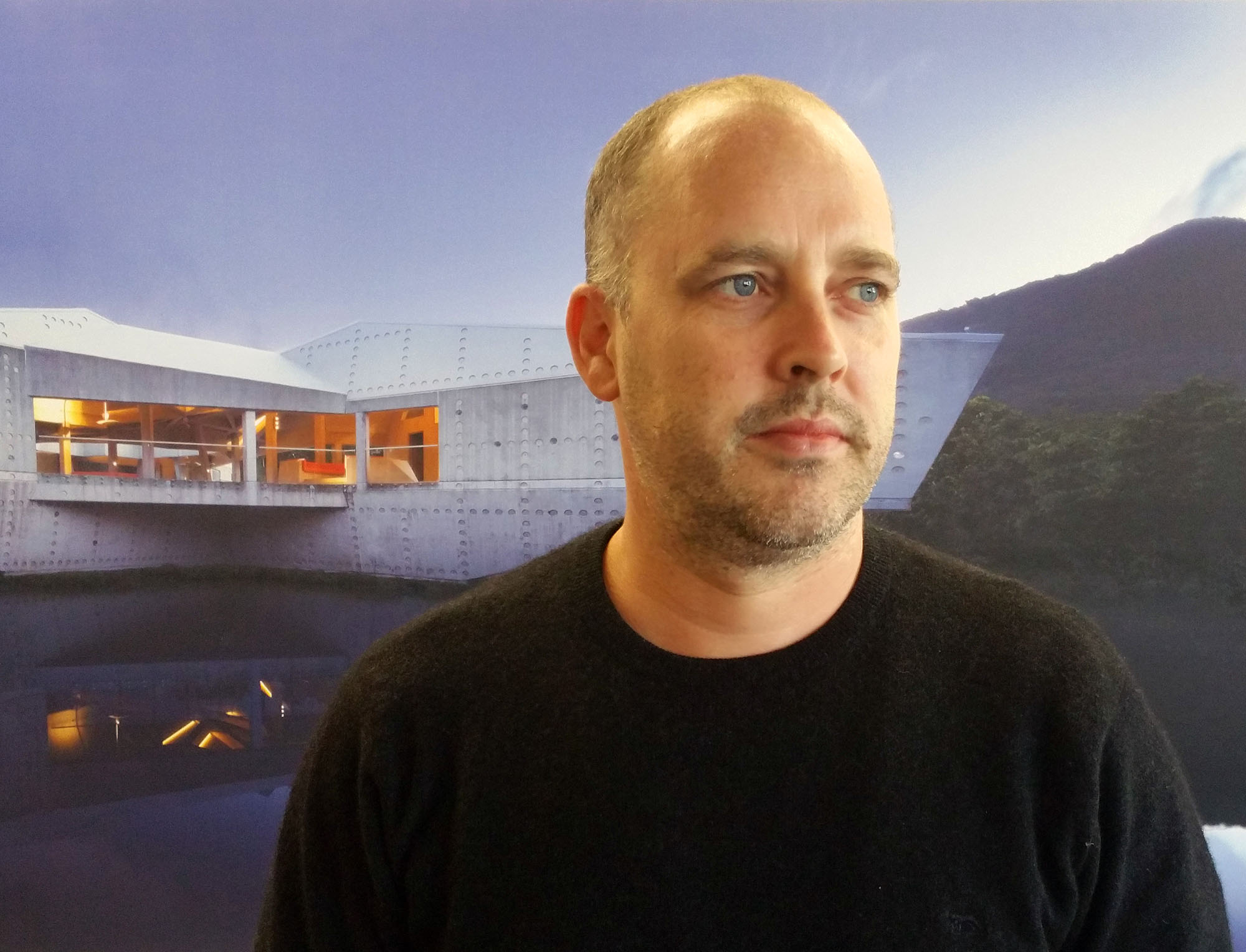
- Charles Wright
- Citizenship: Australian
- Education: RMIT University
- Occupation: Architect
- Practice: Charles Wright Architects

Charles Wright is an Australian architect and founder of Charles Wright Architects, an architectural practice with studios in Port Douglas, Queensland and Melbourne, Victoria.

His work includes residential, cultural and educational buildings, particularly in tropical and regional contexts in northern Australia. Among his more notable works are the Stamp House, and the Cairns Botanic Gardens Visitor Centre, both in Queensland.

== Early life and education ==
Wright initially studied fine art before undertaking architectural studies at RMIT University in Melbourne, graduating with first-class honours.

== Career ==
Following graduation Wright worked with Lyons Architects in Melbourne for four years, contributing to institutional and research projects including the BHP Billiton Global Headquarters and the John Curtin School of Medical Research at the Australian National University. Both projects are documented in Justine Clark's monograph More: The Architecture of Lyons 1996–2011, which includes Wright among the architects involved in projects undertaken by the Lyons practice during this period.

Wright later established Charles Wright Architects in Far North Queensland. The practice subsequently expanded to include a studio in Melbourne and undertakes residential, civic and institutional projects across Australia.

== Architectural approach and critical reception ==
Wright’s architecture has been covered in several architectural publications. A profile in ArchitectureAu gave an overview of Wright’s practice in Far North Queensland. This noted his work within the environmental and cultural conditions of northern Australia. Projects are shaped by external factors such as cyclones and other climate conditions. His work shows some recurring themes, including passive environmental strategies, the integration of landscape and architecture, and open spatial forms. The end result tries to make the design adapt well to tropical living. The profile also notes Wright’s interest in structural expression, with distinctive structural systems and sculptural forms.

A 2023 article in Australian Design Review wrote about the establishment and operation of Charles Wright Architects in northern Australia, outlining the logistical and personal time challenges of operating a relatively small business that prefers not to outsource work. CWA has delivered a wide range of project types and received multiple awards; Wright highlights sustainability and climate‑responsive design as central concerns for the profession and believes architects have a responsibility to build durable and environmentally responsible structures.

Architectural historian Patrick Bingham-Hall mentioned Wright’s work in Architecture Australia, in an article on the Stamp House project. There he discussed themes such as strong conceptual ideas and expressive structures. He noted the treatment of architecture as a spatial and landscape intervention. In his more recent book The Iconic Tropical House, Bingham‑Hall gave Wright’s projects a position within contemporary tropical residential architecture, and he noted their combination of environmental responsiveness and substantial structural expression. This related them to the wider traditions of modernist and tropical architectural experimentation. Bingham-Hall compared Wright's work to other architects, such as John Lautner, Oscar Niemeyer and Eero Saarinen, in terms of their projects in tropical Asia and Central America.

== Notable works ==
=== Stamp House ===
Stamp House is a private residence in Cape Tribulation, Queensland, and it was completed in 2013. The building is organised as a series of cantilevered concrete pods radiating from a central living space. The building is surrounded by water, resulting in a star-shaped configuration, designed to integrate with the surrounding rainforest. Stamp House is one of the 850 examples of Brutalist architecture profiled in the Phaidon Press Atlas of Brutalist Architecture.

The client was a stamp collector, and the house has been built with a philatelic theme, including a perforation dot motif running along the length of the building. The front pool is shaped into the design of the Gwoya Jungarai stamp known as One Pound Jimmy. The architectural historian Patrick Bingham-Hall suggested that the project was an experimental demonstration of tropical architecture. It combined expressive structural form with environmental strategies, such as natural ventilation and climatic protection. Rather than adopting lightweight construction typical of many tropical houses, the design employs robust concrete structures, which were designed to withstand cyclonic weather conditions, which are a feature of northern Queensland's climate. Bingham-Hall wrote that the project explores relationships between architecture, site and climate. The building operates both as a residence and as a landscape intervention, with the concrete pods projecting across a man-made lake, that functions as a climatic buffer and storm-protection device. The central living space remains open and naturally ventilated, supporting shaded outdoor living suited to the tropical environment.

The project received the Robin Dods Award for Residential Architecture at the Queensland Architecture Awards and has been covered internationally in the architectural press, including by Dezeen, Domus and Wired.

=== Cairns Botanic Gardens Visitor Centre ===
The Cairns Botanic Gardens Visitor Centre is a public facility that serves as the entry point to the Cairns Botanic Gardens in Queensland. The project incorporates shaded circulation areas, landscape integration and passive environmental strategies suited to the tropical climate of northern Queensland.

The work featured on the front cover of Architectural Review Australia, which described the building, that has a spatial layout, as using mirrored surfaces and curved forms that visually blend with the surrounding rainforest. The article characterised the project as exploring movement and environmental interaction, through the use of reflective façades with curved geometry. This created changing visual relationships between the building and its landscape. The building forms a transition between the urban edge of Cairns and the gardens, with sheltered outdoor areas designed to mediate between the two settings. The project received the Eddie Oribin Award for Regional Architecture at the Far North Queensland Architecture Awards.

=== Glass House ===
The Glass House is a residential project in Cairns, Queensland, designed by Charles Wright Architects. The starting point for its design was the glass-house concept used in the International Style of architecture. One well known version of that is Philip Johnson’s well known 1949 Glass House in Connecticut. Cairns' version has been adapted to take account of the tropical climate, but retains concepts such as material "honesty", a simple geometric design, and minimising excessive ornamentation. The project has two concrete-block enclosures for the living room and bedroom spaces, and a single glass box for the library. The enclosed spaces are each contained by a rectilinear steel frame, a flat white ceiling and a polished concrete flooring. The rest of the house dispenses with walls, and is thus open to the garden. The property was designed to be accessible for wheelchairs, the clients had a number of specific requirements that Wright needed to accommodate, including low maintenance. Architectural critic Shaneen Fantin described the project as beautiful: "If this house were on a rural lot, it would be courageous but not unbelievable. This house is extraordinary because it is in the middle of an inner-city suburb in Cairns."

The project was recognised at the Australian Institute of Architects National Architecture Awards, where the jury described it as a climate‑responsive design that gives an alternative suburban model for tropical regions. The citation noted its use of shading, natural ventilation and rainwater harvesting to support environmental performance.

=== Trinity Anglican School Science Building ===
The Trinity Anglican School Science Building is part of the White Rock campus of Trinity Anglican School in Cairns, Queensland. Completed in 2015 and designed by Charles Wright Architects, the project developed a dedicated secondary school science structure.

The two-storey edifice is constructed primarily from concrete in a single masonry block, with an articulated sunscreen roof of prefabricated steel channels. The ground floor has classrooms, a teachers’ room, reception and an air‑conditioning plant room. On the first floor there are physics, biology and chemistry laboratories, with offices and storage areas. The interior is utilitarian, where lighting and similar infrastructure are shown exposed from the off‑form concrete ceilings, rather than hidden; the roof, connected by lifts, is covered in synthetic grass, for events and solar equipment. The new building occupies a comparatively large footprint within the school's premises, where the other buildings are relatively modest in scale. So the design here included the use of a shallow S‑shaped plan, to visually reduce its impact. The pre-fabricated shading roof, and a central "hole" in the main bend, have been noted for giving students a changing pattern of perspective, shade and light during their day. The hole opens to a pair of curved staircases, giving visibility to both floors. There are symbolic references in the design. The double-helix of DNA is one perspective some users may notice. The intent is to create an architectural image associated with science and discovery.

The project received the inaugural Jennifer Taylor Award for Educational Architecture at the 2016 Queensland Architecture Awards. In its citation the Australian Institute of Architects jury described the building's twisting steel sunshade as a distinctive architectural element inspired by scientific symbolism and identified the project as an innovative prototype for educational buildings in tropical environments.

=== Engineering and Innovation Place, James Cook University ===
Engineering and Innovation Place is a university building within James Cook University in Townsville, Queensland, designed to support engineering and innovation programmes, which were previously scattered across the campus. The project was part of a long-standing redevelopment plan, which had the intention of creating new building structures which were better connected to each other and which responded to the particular climate of Townsville. Construction started in March 2021, with completion in December 2023. The overall project is attributed to Richard Kirk Architect, i4architecture and Charles Wright Architects.

Some 20,000 m² of infrastructure was combined into a compact building of 9,400 m², where modern teaching methods were worked into the design. This includes a multi‑modal studio enables large‑group, project‑based learning; teaching spaces of various dimensions, laboratories, workshops and prototyping areas. These are arranged around a triple height atrium around a central stairwell, which can be used as an informal auditorium. The design responds to the dry‑tropics climate through deep roof eaves, some up to 13 metres deep, shaded microclimates, extensive transparency and surrounding planting areas for thermal buffering. The façade is timber-framed, and with the intent is to provide resistance to the cyclones that occasionally pass through. One writer said that the end result will "demonstrate ways of addressing the unique climate through innovative and memorable spaces."

The project received the Daryl Jackson Award for Educational Architecture at the Australian Institute of Architects National Architecture Awards, where the jury described it as an "exceptional piece of educational architecture." The building was also recognised in the Prix Versailles architecture awards programme, which highlights contemporary architecture in relation to cultural and environmental contexts.

== Practice ==
Charles Wright Architects operates from studios in Port Douglas, Queensland and Melbourne, Victoria and undertakes residential, cultural and institutional projects across Australia.
