= Charles Henry Hamilton Wright =

Irish Anglican clergyman

The Reverend C. H. H. Wright
- Born: Charles Henry Hamilton Wright; 9 March 1836
- Died: 22 March 1909 (aged 73)
- Citizenship: United Kingdom
- Education: Trinity College Dublin
- Religion: Christianity (Anglican)
- Church: Church of England; Church of Ireland
- Ordained: 1859

Charles Henry Hamilton Wright (9 March 1836, Dublin – 22 March 1909) was an Irish Anglican clergyman.

== Biography ==
Wright was the second son of barrister Edward Wright and his wife Charlotte. His older brother was Edward Percival Wright. He graduated from Trinity College, Dublin, in 1857. He was Bampton lecturer at Oxford in 1878, Donnellan lecturer at Dublin 1880, Grinfield lecturer on the Septuagint at Oxford 1893–97, and vicar of Saint John's, Liverpool, 1891–98, examiner in Hebrew at the University of London 1897–99, at the University of Wales 1897–1901, and clerical superintendent of the Protestant Reformation Society in 1898–1907.

== Publications ==
- Grammar of Modern Irish (1855; ed. 1860)
- Book of Genesis in Hebrew (1859)
- Bunyan's Works with Notes (1866)
- Fragments and Specimens of Early Latin (1874)
- The One Religion (1881)
- The Book Of Koheleth, Commonly Called Ecclesiastes, Considered In Relation To Modern Criticism, And To The Doctrines Of Modern Pessimism, With A Grammatical Commentary And A Revised Translation – The Donnellan Lectures 1880–1881 (1883)
- Biblical Essays (1885)
- Roman Catholicism in the Light of Scripture (2d ed., 1897)
- The Intermediate State and Prayers for the Dead (1900)
- "An Introduction to the Old Testament" Theological Educator (1900) published by Thomas Whitaker New York ....Many editions were published in

n several countries.

- Genuine Writings of Saint Patrick with Life (1902)
- Daniel and his Prophecies (1906)

== Family ==
He was married to Ebba (née Almroth). They had five sons: Sir Almroth Wright, a noted bacteriologist and immunologist; Charles Theodore Hagberg Wright, a noted librarian; Eric Blackwood Wright (1 May 1860 – 10 April 1940), Chief Justice of the Seychelles; Major-General Henry Brooke Hagstromer Wright (1864–1948); Rev. Ernest Alexanderson Wright (1865–1926 or 1931).
