= Charles Wright (mayor) =

American politician

Charles "Chuck" J. Wright (1937–1998) was Mayor of Davenport, Iowa from 1977 to 1981 for two terms. He was responsible for getting the Ground Transportation Center and the RiverCenter off the ground while serving as mayor.

After a severe automobile crash which led to his death in 1998, the Davenport City Council renamed the Ground Transportation Center after him. Prior to becoming elected Mayor he was the Chief of Police for the Davenport Police Department. He is survived by four daughters, Tamie, Debbie, Lisa, Gina and twelve grandchildren.
