= Charles Henry Conrad Wright =

C. H. Conrad Wright
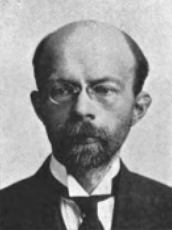
- Born: November 16, 1869; Chicago, Illinois
- Died: May 16, 1957 (aged 87); Cambridge, Massachusetts
- Occupations: Professor of French language and literature

Charles Henry Conrad Wright (1869–1957) was a professor of French language and literature and author of several books, notably his 990-page A History of French Literature (1912). He specialized in French literature of the 16th and 17th centuries.

== Biography ==
Charles Henry Conrad Wright was born ten weeks after the death of his father. His father Charles Henry Wright had married Margaret B. Upham McMaster in 1868 and acquired a stepdaughter Marian Lois Wright (1861–1888), who was born Marian Lois McMaster. In 1874, Margaret Wright with her son and daughter sailed from Boston to Liverpool, England. After studying art in Paris, Marian Lois Wright returned in 1880 to the United States. From 1874 to 1884, Margaret Wright lived with her son in various European countries, including England, France (where C. H. Conrad Wright became fluent in French), and Italy. C. H. Conrad Wright studied at the Collège de Honfleur. In 1884, mother and son returned to the United States and eventually settled, in 1886, in Cambridge, Massachusetts, where C. H. Conrad Wright attended Harvard University.

Upon his graduation in 1891, he was offered a position as instructor in French, but he decided to enroll at Trinity College, Oxford University, and set sail again for England in July of that year. After graduating from Oxford, he returned home in 1895 to take a position as French instructor at Harvard. He taught at Harvard for many years, finishing as Professor of French Language and Literature. In 1903, he purchased Windy Ledge, a farm in Maine where the family would spend its summers. Their neighbors included the Westons and the Thayers. In 1914, C. H. C. Wright married Elizabeth Woodman, and they had three sons: Walter Woodman Wright, C. Conrad Wright, and Brooks Wright.

C. H. Conrad Wright received an M.A. from Oxford in 1899, after receiving a bachelor's degree there in 1895. He spent the academic year 1908–1909 on a sabbatical trip to Europe.

He died at his home in Cambridge, Massachusetts on May 16, 1957.

== Selected publications ==
- A history of French literature. 1912.
- A history of the third French republic. 1916.
- French classicism. 1920.
- The background of modern French literature. 1926.
- as editor:
  - Selections from Montaigne, ed. with notes by C. H. Conrad Wright. 1914.
  - French verse of the XVI century. 1916.
