= London Library =

Independent library in London, England

Coordinates: 51.507°N 0.137°W

The London Library
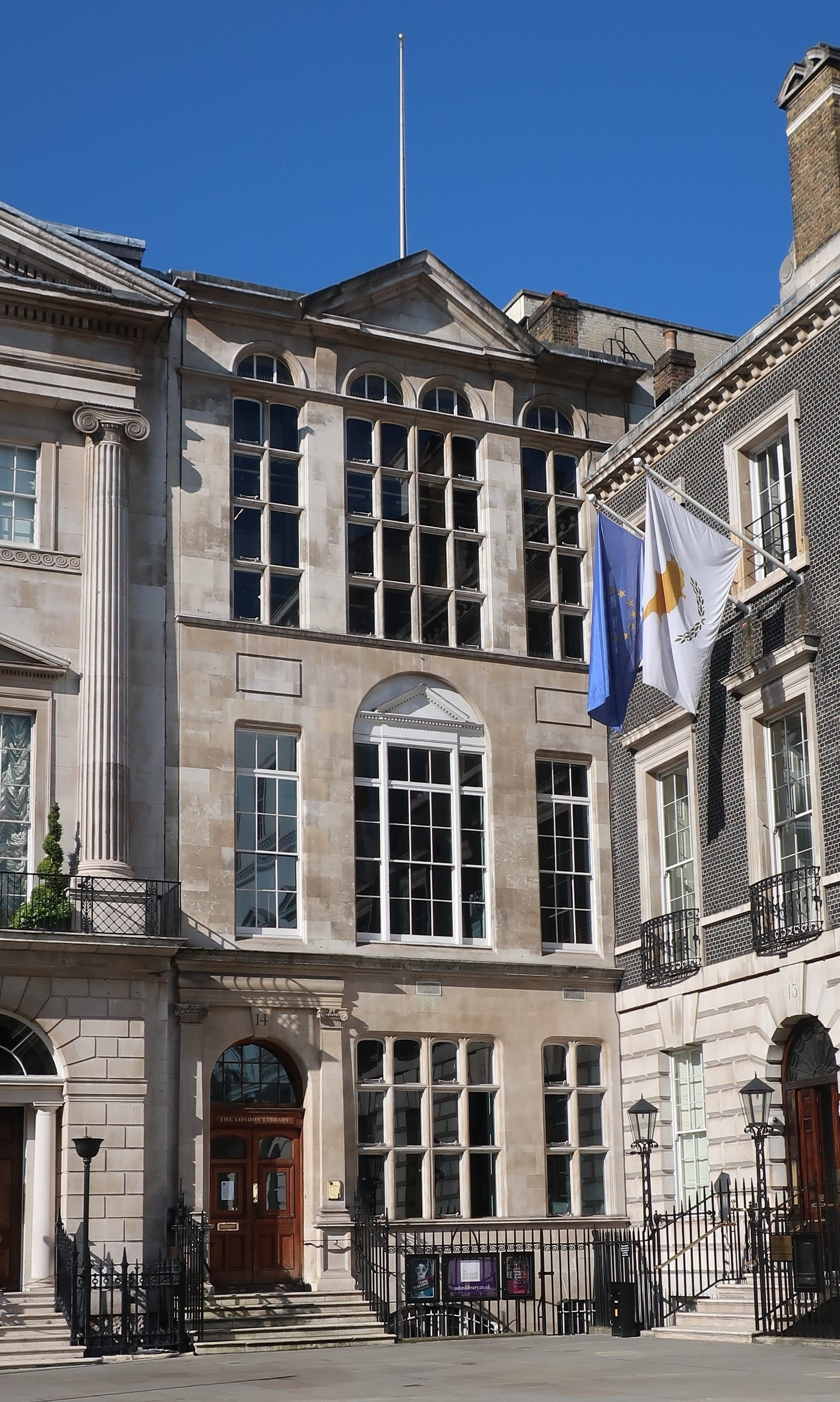
- Entrance to the London Library in St James's Square
- Formation: 1841
- Founder: Thomas Carlyle
- Type: Subscription library
- Location: 14 St James's Square, London SW1
- Members: c7,500 (2023)
- Patron: Queen Camilla
- President: Helena Bonham Carter
- Chairman of Trustees: Simon Godwin
- Director: Philip Marshall
- Website: www.londonlibrary.co.uk

The London Library is an independent lending library in London, established in 1841. Membership is open to all, on payment of an annual subscription, with life and corporate memberships also available. As of December 2023 the Library had around 7,500 members.

The Library was founded on the initiative of Thomas Carlyle, who was dissatisfied with some of the policies at the British Museum Library. It is located at 14 St James's Square, in the St James's area of the City of Westminster, which has been its home since 1845.

T. S. Eliot, a long-serving president of the library, argued in July 1952 in an address to members that, "whatever social changes come about, the disappearance of the London Library would be a disaster to civilisation".

== Trustees and governance ==
The London Library is a self-supporting, independent institution. It is a registered charity whose sole aim is the advancement of education, learning, and knowledge. It was incorporated by Royal charter on 13 June 1933, with a supplemental Royal Charter granted on 21 October 1968. On 6 July 2004, Elizabeth II granted the Library a new Royal Charter, which revoked both the 1933 and 1968 charters. It has its own byelaws and the power to make or amend its rules. It has a royal patron, an elected president and vice presidents, and is administered by an elected board of a maximum of 15 trustees, including the Chairman and the Treasurer.

== History ==
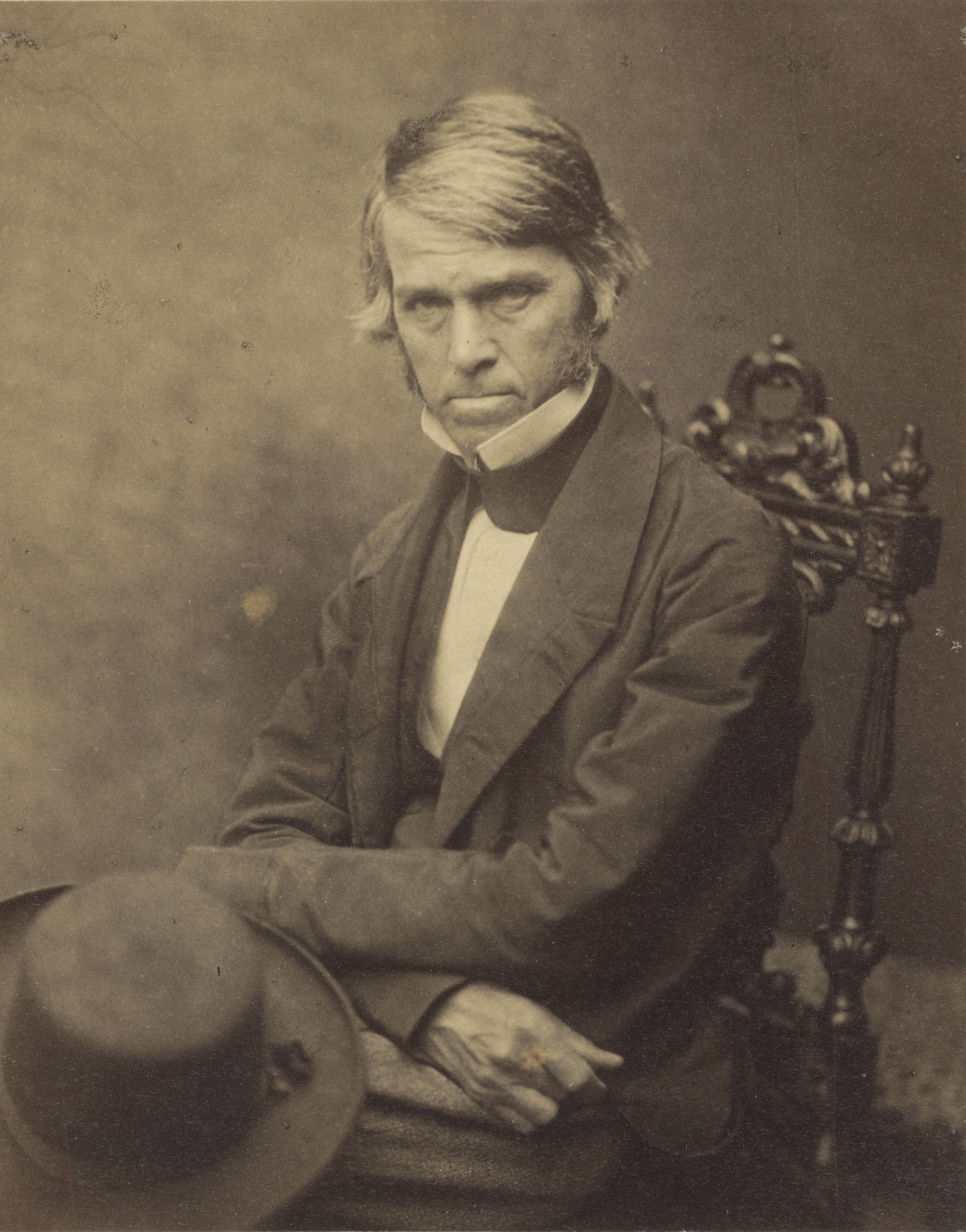
Thomas Carlyle by Robert Scott Tait, 31 July 1854

The chief instigator in the Library's foundation was Thomas Carlyle. He had become frustrated by the facilities available at the British Museum Library, where he was often unable to find a seat (obliging him to perch on ladders), where he complained that the enforced close confinement with his fellow readers gave him a "museum headache", where the books were unavailable for loan, and where he found the library's collections of pamphlets and other material relating to the French Revolution and English Civil Wars inadequately catalogued. In particular, he developed an antipathy for the Keeper of Printed Books, Anthony Panizzi (despite the fact that Panizzi had allowed him many privileges not granted to other readers), and criticised him, as the "respectable Sub-Librarian", in a footnote to an article published in the Westminster Review. Carlyle's eventual solution, with the support of a number of influential friends, was to call for the establishment of a private subscription library from which books could be borrowed.

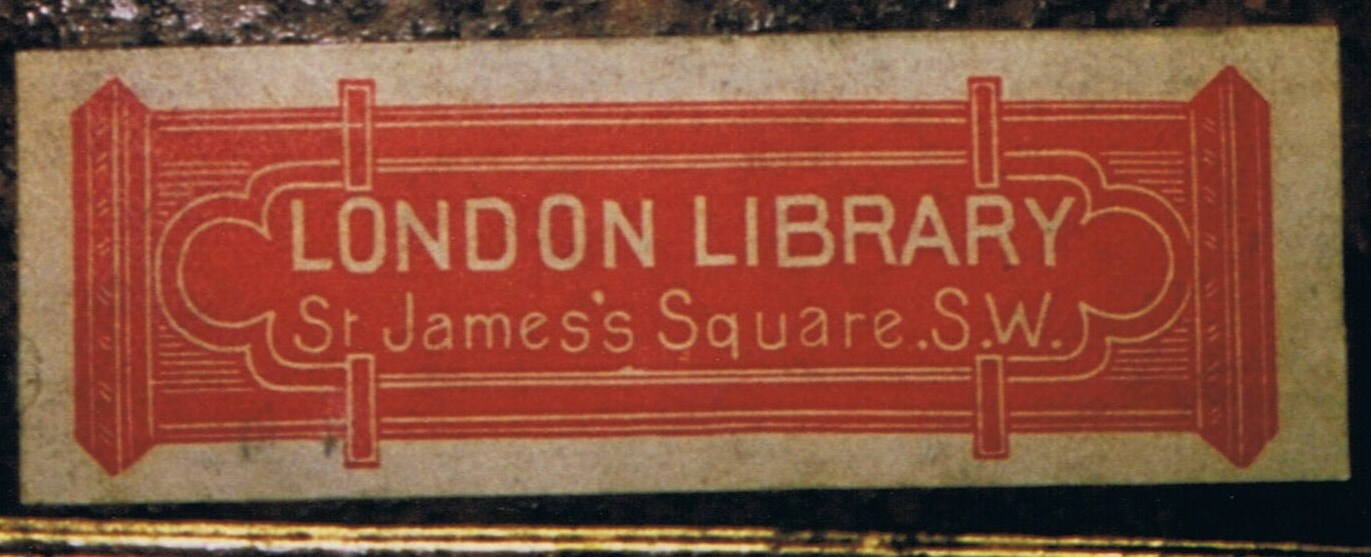
19th-century London Library book label

George Villiers, 4th Earl of Clarendon was the Library's first president, William Makepeace Thackeray its first auditor, and William Gladstone and Sir Edward Bunbury sat on the first committee. The Belgian freedom fighter and former Louvain librarian Sylvain Van de Weyer was a vice-president from 1848 to 1874. (Van de Weyer's father-in-law, Joshua Bates was a founder of the Boston Public Library in 1852.)

A vigorous and long-serving presence in later Victorian times was Richard Monckton-Milnes, later Lord Houghton, a friend of Florence Nightingale. Charles Dickens was among the founder members. In more recent times, Kenneth Clark and T. S. Eliot have been among the Library's presidents, and Sir Harold Nicolson, Sir Rupert Hart-Davis and the Michael Astor have been Chairmen.

(Sir) Charles Hagberg Wright, who served as Secretary and Librarian from 1893 to 1940, is remembered as "the real architect of the London Library as it is today". He oversaw the rebuilding of its premises in the 1890s, the re-cataloguing and rearrangement of its collections under its own unique classification system, and the publication of its catalogue in 1903, with a second edition in 1913–14 and later supplements.

In 1957 the Library received an unanticipated demand from the Westminster City Council for business rates (despite being registered as a tax-free charity), and the Inland Revenue also became involved. At that time, most publishers donated free copies of their books to the library. A final appeal was turned down by the Court of Appeal in 1959, and a letter in The Times of 5 November from the President and Chairman (T. S. Eliot and Rupert Hart-Davis) appealed for funds. A subsequent letter from Winston Churchill commented that "The closing of this most worthy institution would be a tragedy". Financial donations reached £17,000, and an auction of books, manuscripts and artworks on 22 June 1960 raised over £25,000 – enough to clear debts and legal expenses of £20,000. At the sale, some T. E. Lawrence items donated by his brother fetched £3,800; Eliot's The Waste Land fetched £2,800, and Lytton Strachey's Queen Victoria £1,800, though 170 inscribed books and pamphlets from John Masefield fetched only £200, which Hart-Davis thought "shamefully little". Queen Elizabeth II donated a book from Queen Victoria's library, and the Queen Mother a Sheffield plate wine cooler.

In the 1990s, the Library was one of a number of academic and specialist libraries targeted by serial book thief William Jacques. The identification of several rare books put up for auction as having been stolen from the Library led the police to investigate Jacques and to his eventual prosecution and conviction. Security measures at the Library have since been improved.

20th-century London Library book label designed by Reynolds Stone

== Collections ==
The Library's collections, which range from the 16th century to the present day, are strong within the fields of literature, fiction, fine and applied art, architecture, history, biography, philosophy, religion, topography, and travel. The social sciences are more lightly covered. Pure and natural sciences, technology, medicine, and law are not within the library's purview, although it has some books in all of those fields; books on their histories are normally acquired. Periodicals and annuals on a wide range of subjects are also held in the collections. Special collections include subjects of hunting, field sports, Rubaiyat of Omar Khayyam, and of Jewish interest.

The Library now holds more than one million items, and each year, it acquires approximately 8,000 new books and periodicals. 97% of the collection is available for loan, either on-site or through the post. It is the largest lending library in Europe. Members play a central role in the selection and development of the collections, bequeathing their personal libraries, donating copies of their own books, serving on the Books Selection Committee, making suggestions for acquisition, and more.

The Library also subscribes to many ejournals and other online databases. All post-1950 acquisitions are searchable on the on-line catalogue, and pre-1950 volumes are progressively being added as part of the Retrospective Cataloguing Project.

95% of the collection is housed on open shelves (the remaining 5% includes rare books held in secure storage). This open access policy—which contrasts with that in many other large libraries, including the British Library – is greatly valued by members. Colin Wilson remembered his first visit to the library in the mid 1960s: "I have always had an obsession about books, and in this place I felt like a sex maniac in the middle of a harem". Arthur Koestler recorded how in 1972, commissioned to report on the Spassky–Fischer chess championship in Reykjavík, he visited the Library to carry out some background research:

I hesitated for a moment whether to go to the "C" for chess section first, or the "I" for Iceland section, but chose the former, because it was nearer. There were about twenty to thirty books on chess on the shelves, and the first that caught my eye was a bulky volume with the title, Chess in Iceland and Icelandic Literature by Willard Fiske, published in 1905 by the Florentine Typographical Society, Florence, Italy.

Peter Parker wrote in 2008:

One of the pleasures and privileges of belonging to the London Library is wandering through its labyrinthine book-stacks with no particular aim in mind. Anyone who wants to find a particular one of the million or so books or 2,500 periodicals can do so easily enough in the catalogue, but serendipitous browsing is what many members find particularly rewarding. ... One of the best places to do this is in the capacious Science and Miscellaneous section, that glorious omnium gatherum subdivided into such widely divergent subjects as Conjuring and Colour-Blindness, Domestic Servants and Duelling, Gas and Geodesy, Human Sacrifice and Hypnotism, Laughter and Lotteries, Pain and Poultry, Sewage Disposal and Somnambulism, or Vinegar and Vivisection.

And Roger Kneebone wrote in 2015:

Because the Library's classification – especially in Science and Miscellaneous – is so idiosyncratic, it doesn't conform to the systems that populate my own mind. So going in search of a book becomes a journey of discovery in itself.

In 1944, the Library lost some 16,000 volumes to bomb damage, and in 1970 its few incunabula were sold. With those exceptions, it was formerly library policy to retain virtually all items acquired since its foundation, on the grounds that, as books are never entirely superseded, and therefore never redundant, the collections should not be weeded of material merely because it was old, idiosyncratic or unfashionable. In 2019, under pressure for space, the decision was taken to reverse this policy, and to introduce a new strategy of withdrawing from the collections some journal and government publication material now available online, some foreign language journals, duplicate copies of books, and other material considered obsolete; and also to move some low-use material to off-site storage.

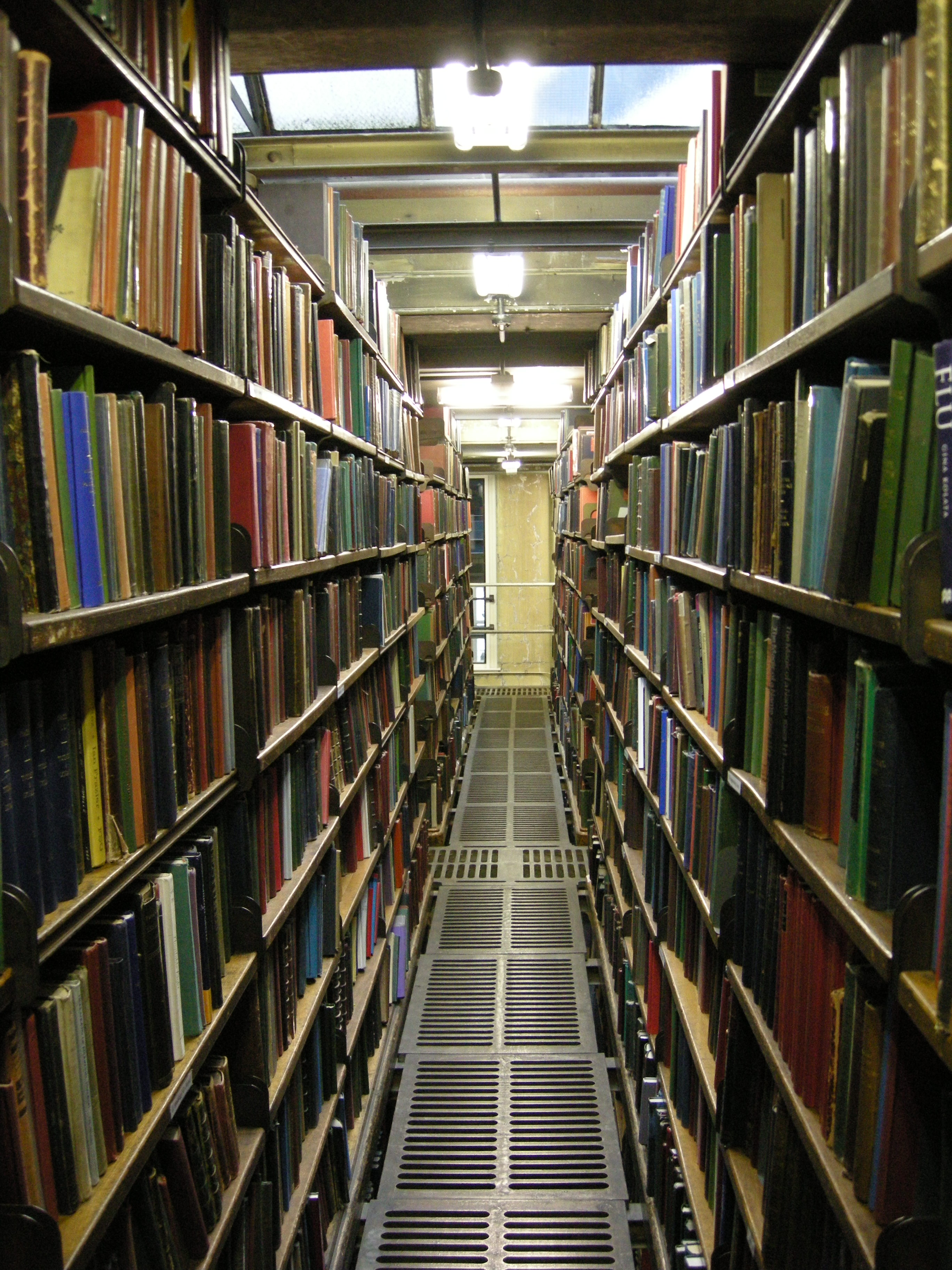
Bookstack in the 1896–98 building.

== Buildings ==
Following its foundation in 1841, the Library spent four years occupying rooms on the first floor of 49 Pall Mall. In 1845 it moved to 14 St James's Square, and this site has been its home ever since. However, its premises have undergone a considerable number of changes and extensions over the years as the collections have grown.

The property in St James's Square first occupied by the Library was a house, Beauchamp House, built in 1676 and renovated at later dates. A proposal in the 1770s (when it was owned by Lord Newhaven) to rebuild it to a design by Robert Adam was abandoned, but it was refronted shortly afterwards. It was located in the north-west corner of the square, and had a much smaller frontage than its neighbours, being described by A. I. Dasent in 1895 as "admittedly the worst house in the Square". The Library rented the house from 1845, but in 1879 bought the freehold. In the early years, to defray costs, some of the rooms were let to the Statistical Society of London, the Philological Society, and the Institute of Actuaries.

In 1896–1898 the premises were completely rebuilt to the designs of James Osborne Smith, and this building survives as the front part of the present library complex. The façade, overlooking St James's Square, is constructed in Portland stone in a broadly Jacobethan style, described by the Survey of London as "curiously eclectic". The main reading room is on the first floor; and above this, three tall windows light three floors of bookstack. Another four floors of bookstacks were built to the rear. In 1920–22, an additional seven-storey bookstack was built further back still, again designed by Osborne Smith. (This new stack was notable for its opaque glass floors: an unforeseen drawback of the combination of glass floors and structural metal shelving was that browsers in the stacks were liable to receive periodic jolts of static electricity, a problem which continues to catch new members unawares, and for which no solution has ever been found.) In 1932–34 another extension was carried out to the north, incorporating a committee room (named the Prevost Room, after a major benefactor; now converted to use as a reading room), an Art Room, and five more floors of bookstacks: the architects on this occasion were the firm of Mewès & Davis.

In February 1944, during the Second World War, the northern bookstacks suffered considerable damage when the Library suffered a direct hit from a bomb: 16,000 volumes were destroyed, including most of the Biography section. Although the library reopened in July, repairs to the buildings were not completed until the early 1950s.

Following the war, the Library continued to experience a need for increased space, although the practical possibilities for expansion were limited. A mezzanine was inserted within the Art Room in the early 1970s; four floors of book stacks were constructed above the north bay of the reading room in 1992; and in 1995 the Anstruther Wing (named after its benefactor, Ian Anstruther) was erected at the extreme rear of the site, a nine-storey building on a small footprint designed principally to house rare books storage.

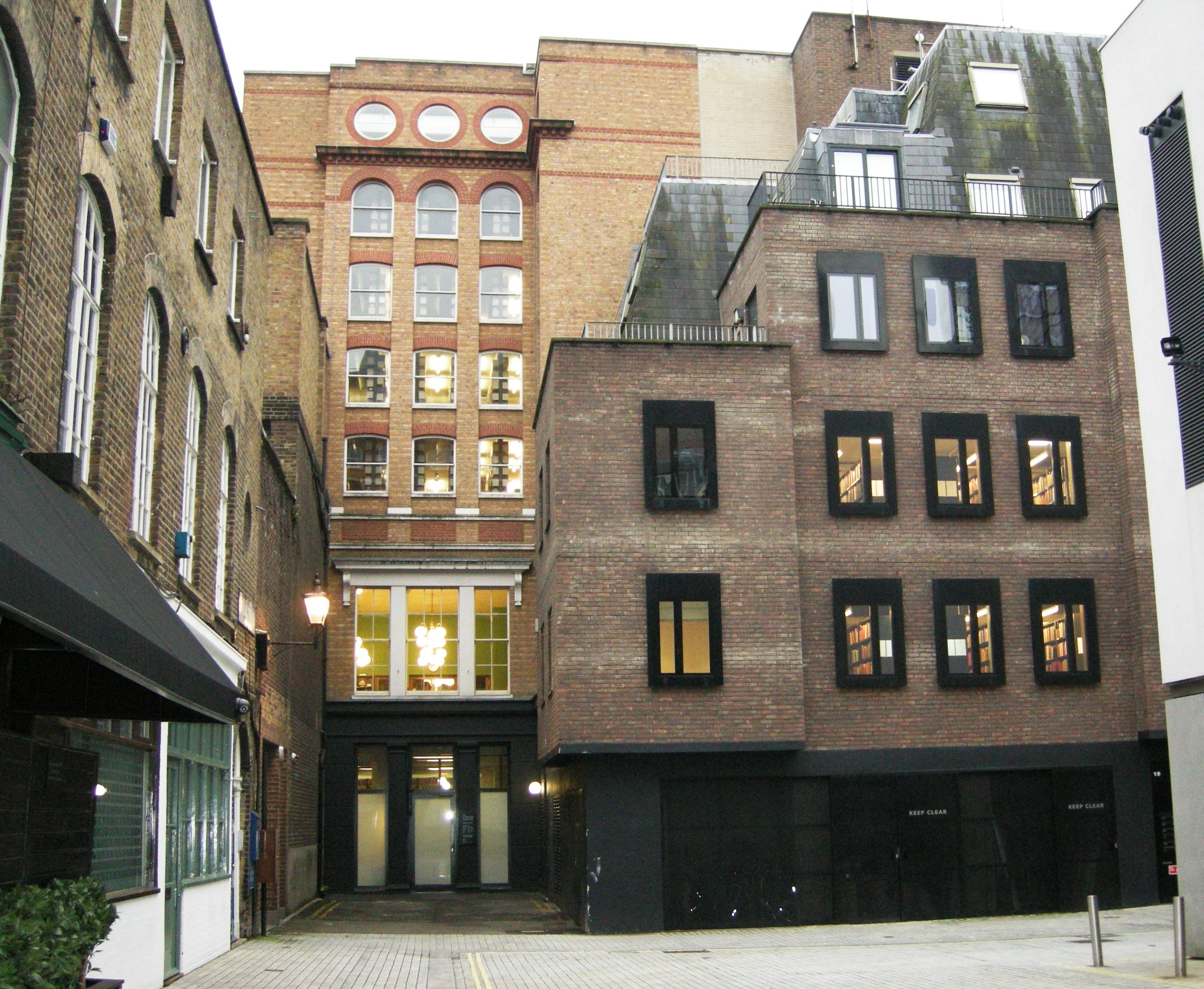
View of the library buildings from Mason's Yard. The lighted windows at centre left include those of the Stoppard Room (the northern reading room) on the first floor, with the 1992 bookstack above. The darker brick building to the right is T. S. Eliot House.

In 2004, the Library acquired Duchess House, a four-storey 1970s office building adjoining the north side of the existing site, which increased overall capacity by 30%. The building was renamed T. S. Eliot House in 2008. The opportunity was taken for a major rationalisation and overhaul of the greater part of the library's premises. Staff activities were concentrated in T. S. Eliot House (freeing up space in the older buildings for book storage and members' facilities); a new reading room was inserted in a lightwell; the Art Room was completely restructured and redesigned; the main Issue Hall remodelled; new circulation routes created; and other alterations were made elsewhere. The first phase of work, the modification and refurbishment of T. S. Eliot House, was completed in 2007, and the second phase in 2010. The architects for the redevelopment were Haworth Tompkins; while the toilets were designed in collaboration with Turner Prize-winning artist Martin Creed.

The building has been listed Grade II on the National Heritage List for England since February 1958.

== Subscription ==
In 1903 the annual membership subscription was £3. During the 1930s it was £4 4s and fees remained at this level into the 1950s. In November 1981 the annual subscription was £60. Following the acquisition of T. S. Eliot House, from 2008 the subscription was significantly increased from £210 to £375. As of September 2024 the annual fee for standard membership is £615.

== Awards and competitions ==
In 2011 the Library launched its Student Prize, a writing competition open to final-year undergraduates at higher education institutions in the UK. The theme was "The future of Britain lies with the right-hand side of the brain", and the winner was announced in March 2012 as Ben Mason, a student at Trinity College, Oxford. The prize was awarded for a second time in 2013 to Kathryn Nave, a student at King's College London, but has now been discontinued.

== 175th anniversary ==
In May 2016 the Library marked the 175th anniversary of its foundation with a three-day literary festival, "Words In The Square", held in St. James's Square. It was organised by James Runcie and David Kynaston, and speakers included the novelists Sebastian Faulks, Victoria Hislop, Nick Hornby, Philippa Gregory and Elif Safak; historians Antony Beevor, Simon Schama and Jerry White; actors Simon Russell Beale, Eleanor Bron and Simon Callow; and former England cricket captains Michael Atherton and Mike Brearley.

== Cultural references ==
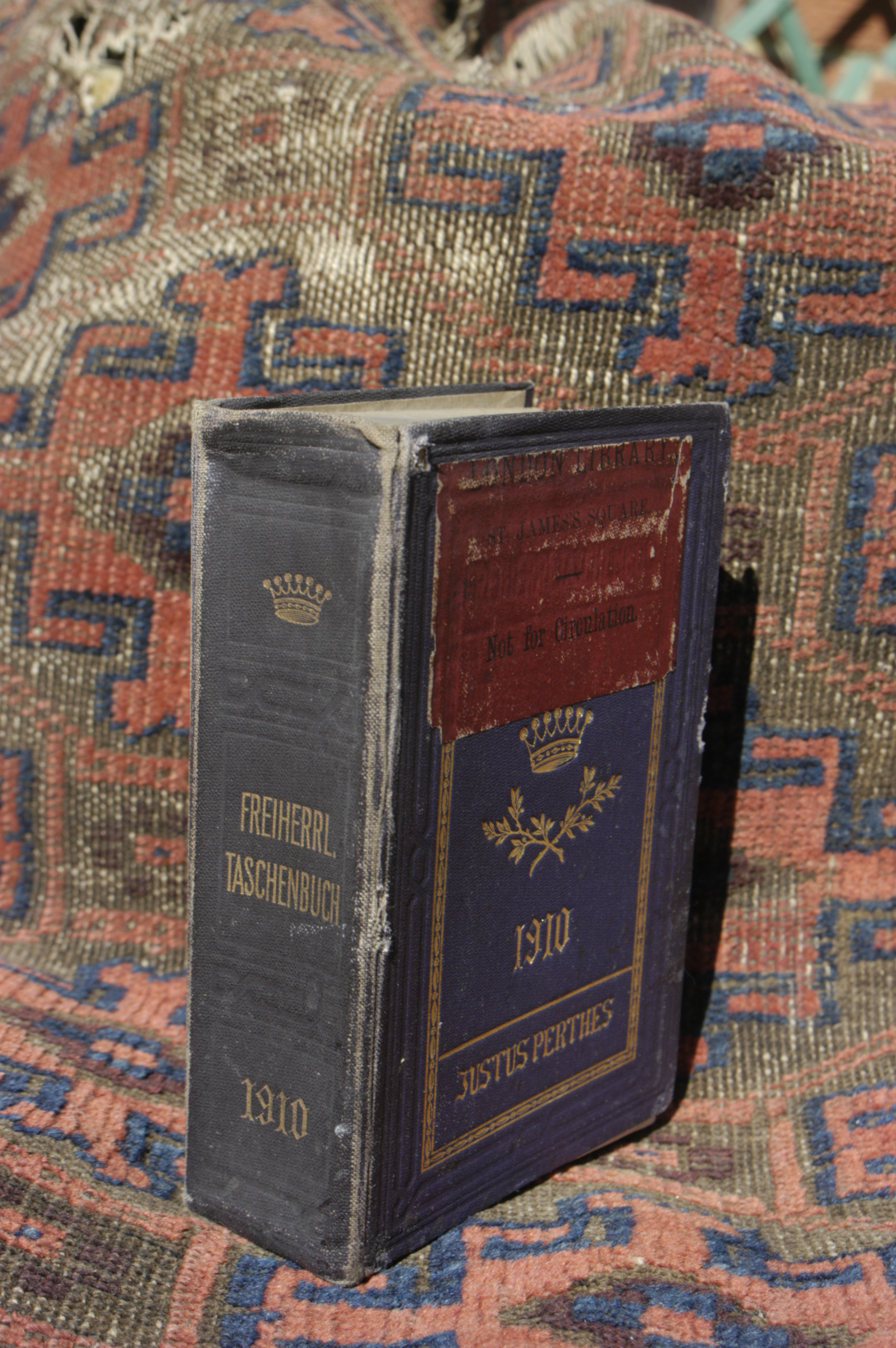
A London Library book, Gothaisches Genealogisches Taschenbuch der Freiherrlichen Häuser, Justus Perthes, Gotha, 1910. This one has been out since 2009. (Photo: 14.4.2014).

The Library has been featured in a number of works of literature and fiction.

=== Literature ===
- Aldous Huxley's comic novel Antic Hay (1923) includes scenes set in and around the library.
- In "The Adventure of the Illustrious Client", a Sherlock Holmes short story by Sir Arthur Conan Doyle (published in 1924 but set in 1902), Dr. Watson visits the Library in order to gain sufficient expertise to pose as an authority on Chinese pottery.
- In Roy Fuller's The Second Curtain (1953), part of the plot turns on the Library's system of recording loans, and the bookstacks are the setting for a chase scene.
- In Ian Fleming's On Her Majesty's Secret Service (1963), James Bond borrows a copy of Burke's General Armory from the Library in order to pose as a representative of the College of Arms.
- A. S. Byatt's novel Possession (1990) opens with the discovery of a Victorian letter hidden within the pages of a rare book in the Library.
- In Michael Frayn's novel Headlong (1999), the protagonist carries out research at the Library in order to establish whether or not the painting at the centre of the plot is truly by Brueghel.
- In the continuation of the detective stories of Dorothy L. Sayers by Jill Paton Walsh, Lady Peter Wimsey (the writer Harriet Vane) uses the Library to research her study of Sheridan Le Fanu.
- In Alan Bennett's novella The Uncommon Reader (2007), the Library supplies books on loan to Queen Elizabeth II.
- In Sebastian Faulks's novel Where My Heart Used to Beat (2015), the protagonist, Dr Hendricks, obtains key information about his host from a book posted to him in Paris by the Library.

=== Film and television ===
- In David Hare's TV film Heading Home (1991) several scenes were filmed at the London Library.
- In the BBC series New Tricks, Series 7, Episode 2 (2010), "It smells of books", there is a murder in the Library.

== Patrons ==
Shortly after the Library's foundation, Prince Albert agreed to serve as its patron. Subsequent royal patrons have been King Edward VII; King George V; King George VI; Queen Elizabeth The Queen Mother; Queen Elizabeth II; and Queen Camilla.

== Presidents ==
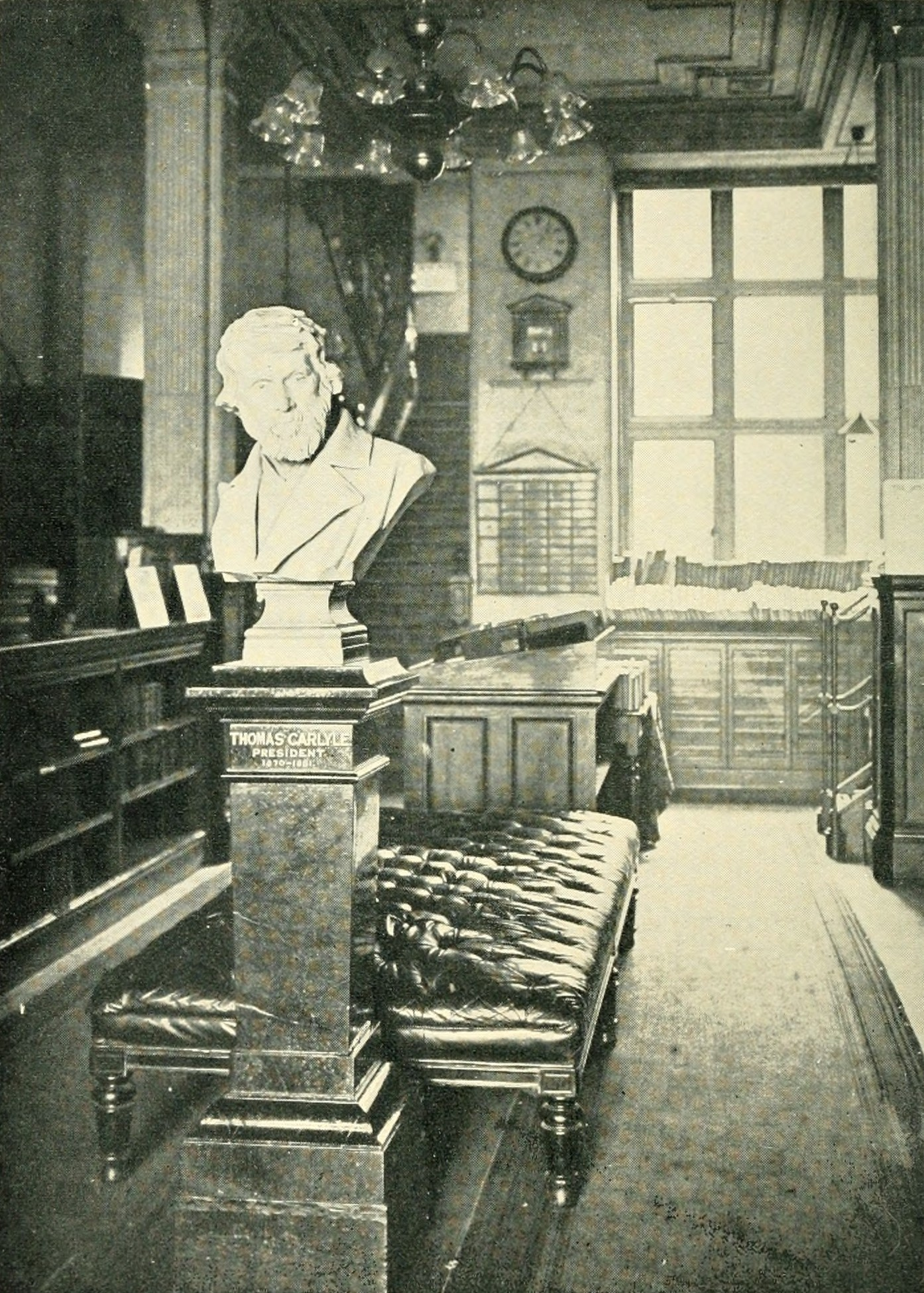
Entrance Hall of the London Library with bust of President Thomas Carlyle, 1907

The office of President of the Library has been held by the following:

- George Villiers, 4th Earl of Clarendon, 1841–1870
- Thomas Carlyle, 1870–1881
- Richard Monckton Milnes, 1st Baron Houghton, 1881–1885
- Alfred, Lord Tennyson, 1885–1892
- Sir Leslie Stephen, 1892–1904
- Arthur Balfour, 1st Earl of Balfour, 1904–1930
- H. A. L. Fisher, 1930–1940
- Giles Fox-Strangways, 6th Earl of Ilchester, 1940–1952
- T. S. Eliot, 1952–1965
- Kenneth Clark, Baron Clark, 1965–1980
- Noel Annan, Baron Annan, 1980–1996
- John Grigg, 1996–2001
- Sir Tom Stoppard, 2002–2017
- Sir Tim Rice, 2017–2022
- Helena Bonham Carter, 2022–

Vice-presidents have included George Lyttelton, 4th Baron Lyttelton, Sir Isaiah Berlin, Sir Rupert Hart-Davis, Lord Kenyon, Max Rayne, Baron Rayne, Sir Steven Runciman, Dame Veronica Wedgwood, Dame Rebecca West, Paul Boateng, Lady Antonia Fraser, Caroline Michel, Jeremy Paxman, Alexandra Shulman and Josie Rourke. Trustees have included Philip Ziegler, Correlli Barnett, Bamber Gascoigne, Lewis Golden, John Gross, Duff Hart-Davis, Sir Charles Johnston, Sir Oliver Millar, Anthony Quinton, Christopher Sinclair-Stevenson, and Claire Tomalin.

== Librarians and Directors ==
The senior manager or chief executive of the Library was historically known as the Librarian and Secretary, and later simply as Librarian. With the appointment of Philip Marshall in 2017, the title was changed to Director. The post has been held by the following:

- John George Cochrane, 1841–1852
- William Bodham Donne, 1852–1857
- Robert Harrison, 1857–1893
- Charles Theodore Hagberg Wright, 1893–1940
- Christopher Purnell, 1940–1950
- Simon Nowell-Smith, 1950–1956
- Stanley Gillam, 1956–1980
- Douglas Matthews, 1980–1993
- Alan Bell, 1993–2001
- Inez Lynn, 2002–2017
- Philip Marshall, 2017–

== See also ==
- List of organisations in the United Kingdom with a royal charter

== Bibliography ==
- Charles Dickens (1882), "Circulating Libraries", Dickens's Dictionary of London, London: Macmillan & Co. (describes the London Library)
- Grindea, Miron, ed. (1978). The London Library. Ipswich: Boydell Press/Adam Books. ISBN 0-85115-098-5.

This book includes contributions from Edmund Gosse; J. M. Barrie; Henry James; George Moore; T. E. Lawrence; and Aldous Huxley (all letters); and short essays by Raymond Mortimer; David Cecil; Anthony Powell; Edna O'Brien; Angus Wilson; Roy Fuller; David Wright; Seán Ó Faoláin; Michael Burn; Enoch Powell; Noel Annan; George Mikes; George D. Painter; D. J. Enright; John Julius Norwich; Miles Kington; J. W. Lambert; John Weightman; A. E. Ellis; Bruce Berlind; Dorothy M. Partington; Stanley Gillam; Douglas Matthews; Michael Higgins; Oliver Stallybrass; Charles Theodore Hagberg Wright; Antony Farrell; Marcel Troulay; and Colin Wilson. The cover was by Nicolas Bentley, and other illustrations include drawings by Edward Ardizzone and Michael Lasserson.

- McIntyre, Anthony (2006). Library Book: an architectural journey through the London Library, 1841–2006. London: London Library. ISBN 9780955327704.
- Wells, John (1991). Rude Words: a discursive history of the London Library. London: Macmillan. ISBN 0333475194.

=== Catalogues ===
- Cochrane, John George (1847). Catalogue of the London Library (2nd ed.). London.
- Harrison, Robert (1875). Catalogue of the London Library (4th ed.). London.
- Wright, C. T. Hagberg; Purnell, C. J. (1913–55). Catalogue of the London Library, St. James's Square, London. London. (10 vols.) Includes: Supplement: 1913–20. 1920. Supplement: 1920–28. 1929. Supplement: 1928–53. 1953 (in 2 vols). Subject index: (Vol. 1). 1909. Vol. 2: Additions, 1909–22. Vol. 3: Additions, 1923–38. 1938. Vol. 4: (Additions), 1938–53. 1955.
