= C. Conrad Wright =

American religious historian

Charles Conrad Wright
- Born: Charles Conrad Wright; February 9, 1917; Cambridge, Massachusetts
- Died: 17 February 2011 (aged 94)
- Other names: Conrad Wright, C. Conrad Wright
- Occupations: American religious historian and scholar of American Unitarianism and congregational polity
- Employer: Harvard Divinity School
- Known for: Authority on Unitarian church history and polity as well as the history of the Divinity School

Charles Conrad Wright (February 9, 1917 – February 17, 2011) was an American religious historian and scholar of American Unitarianism and congregational polity. He served on the faculty of Harvard Divinity School from 1954 to 1987 and continued to write for another decade. During his life, Wright was considered the authority on Unitarian church history and polity as well as the history of the Divinity School.

== Early life and education ==
Born in Cambridge, Massachusetts, Wright was the son of Charles Henry Conrad Wright, a professor of French at Harvard. A Unitarian himself, he was a member of First Parish in Cambridge, the Unitarian Universalist congregation associated with Harvard. His son, Conrad Edick Wright, is a historian of New England.

He attended Browne and Nichols School, then graduated from Harvard College in 1937 before receiving an MA in 1942 and a PhD in 1946 from Harvard.

== Bibliography ==
=== Books ===
- The Beginnings of Unitarianism in America (1955)
- The Liberal Christians (1970)
- Three Prophets of Religious Liberalism: Channing, Emerson, Parker (1986)
- A Stream of Light: A Sesquicentennial History of American Unitarianism (1975) (re-issued in 1989 with the subtitle "A Short History of American Unitarianism")
- Walking Together: Polity and Participation in Unitarian Universalist Churches (1989)
- Congregational Polity: A Historical Survey of Unitarian Universalist Practice (1997)

=== Essay collections ===
- Walking Together: Polity and Participation in Unitarian Universalist Churches (1989)
- The Unitarian Controversy: Essays in American Unitarian History (1994)

=== Edited volumes ===
- Religion in American Life: Selected Readings (1972)

=== Essays ===
- in The Harvard Divinity School: Its Place in Harvard University and in American Culture. (1954). Ed. George H. Williams.
