= Patrick Bingham-Hall =

Australian photographer, author and editor

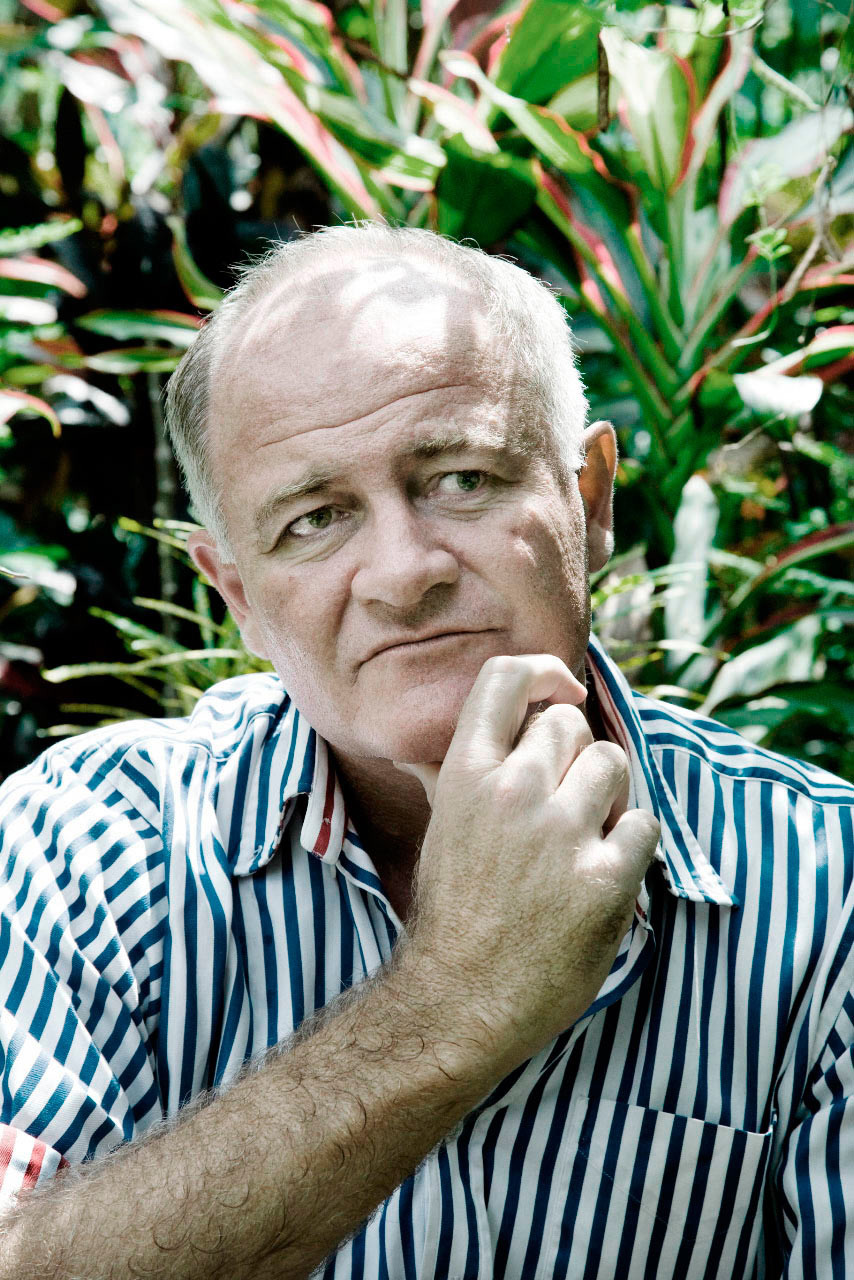
- Born: 15 July 1958 (age 67); Aden, Yemen
- Occupations: Architectural photographer, author, editor
- Website: patrickbingham-hall.com

Patrick Bingham-Hall is an Australian architectural photographer. He is also an architectural writer and editor, and owner of Pesaro Publishing.

== Early life ==
He was born on 15 July 1958 in Aden in Yemen, where his father (Group Captain T. L. Bingham-Hall) was in command of the Royal Air Force base. Patrick spent his early years in London before emigrating to Australia in 1963.

=== Education ===
He was educated at Sydney Church of England Grammar School (Shore) and studied philosophy at Macquarie University for one year, before taking up photography at Sydney College of the Arts. He left in his second year to start his own photographic studio, specializing in rock and roll photography.

=== Early work ===
As a rock and roll photographer, Bingham-Hall worked with bands like Radio Birdman and The Saints. His cover photograph of the Radio Birdman album Living Eyes is a classic of the underground rock scene in Australia.

== Career ==
He began photographing architecture in the early 1980s, and travelled the world to study architectural history and to photograph classic buildings. Many of these photographs were included in his first (self-published) book Monumental Irony. In the 1990s he took the photographs for many books on Australian architecture, and was selected as editor of the book that documented the architecture for the 2000 Sydney Olympic Games. He also wrote Austral Eden in this period - an idiosyncratic history of Australian architecture, and contributed articles to magazines in Australia and England.

=== Pesaro Publishing ===
In 1999, he formed his own publishing company, Pesaro Publishing, which within a few years published many books on Australian architecture with Bingham-Hall acting as both editor and photographer. Majority of his early books for Pesaro were produced in collaboration with Philip Goad, an architectural writer and academic from Melbourne. After publishing Architecture Bali in 2000, Bingham-Hall expanded his publishing into Asia, while continuing to produce books on Australian architecture, writing many of the books himself, particularly on tropical architecture in Asia. He is the author of monographs on WOHA Architects, Guz Architects, Peter Stutchbury, Colin K. Okashimo, K2LD Architects, Cicada Landscape Architects, LOOK Architects, Philip Cox, and Turner Architects. He has written several books on houses in the Asia-Pacific region. In collaboration with WOHA Architects, he wrote Garden City Mega City, which examined the effects of climate change on Asian cities.

== Personal life ==
Patrick Bingham-Hall has been married to Katrina Bingham-Hall (nee Morrison) since 1994. They have five children. His house in Balmain, Sydney, was designed by Rex Addison. He lived in Singapore for many years, and he now divides his time between Singapore, England, and Australia.

== Books written ==
Monumental Irony (1986)	Austral Eden : 200 Years of Australian Architecture (1999)
Durbach Block Architects (1999)	Troppo Architects (1999)
Olympic Architecture: Building Sydney 2000 (2000)	Peter Stutchbury (2000)
James Barnet (2000)	Celebrating Sydney 2000 (2000)
Architecture Bali (2000)	New Directions in Australian Architecture (2001)
A Short History of Brisbane Architecture (2001)	8 Eight Great Houses (2002)
A Short History of Perth Architecture (2002)	A Short History of Melbourne Architecture (2002)
Houses for the 21st Century (2003)	Hassell Architects (2004)
New Directions in Tropical Asian Architecture (2005)	Jones Coulter Young (2005)
Tonkin Zulaikha Greer (2005)	Sydney Architecture (2005)
The Stadium (2005)	New China Architecture (2006)
25 Houses in Singapore and Malaysia (2006)	New Directions in the Australian House (2006)
Alex Popov : Selected Works (2007)	The Australian House (2008)
The Architecture of WOHA (2009)	No Boundaries : The Lien Villas Collective (2010)
Peter Stutchbury : Selected Projects (2010)	The New Asia Pacific House (2010)
Stanisic Live:Work (2011)	WOHA Architects : Selected Projects Vol. 1 (2011)
Tropical Arts and Crafts: The Houses of Guz Wilkinson (2012)	Provoking Calm: The Artworks of Colin K. Okashimo (2013)
A Guide to 21st Century Singapore Architecture (2012)	Tropical Expression: K2LD Architects (2013)
Cicada Landscape Architecture (2013)	LOOK Architects (2013)
WOHA Architects : Selected Projects Vol. 2 (2015)	Garden City Mega City : Rethinking Cities for the Age of Global Warming (2016)
A Spirit of Place : Hiren Patel Architect (2019)	Refreshing Singapore : SG50 Masterplan (2020)
Philip Cox : An Australian Architecture (2020)	Turner : Transforming the City (2022)
WOHA : New Forms of Sustainable Architecture (2022)	Evoking Calm : The Artworks of Colin Okashimo Vol 2 (2024)

== Exhibitions ==
- Parliament House, Canberra, Australia 1988
- RAIA Tusculum, Sydney, Australia 1990
- State Library of New South Wales, Sydney, Australia 1999
- Brisbane City Hall, Queensland, Australia 2004
- RIBA, London, England 2004
- Esplanade Theatres on the Bay, Singapore 2004
- WOHAGA Gallery, Singapore 2007
- Deutsches Arkitektur Museum, Frankfurt, Germany 2011
- Creative Design Space at NAFA, Singapore 2012
