= Anglo-Russian Committee =

Defunct Soviet and British trade union organization

Anglo-Russian Committee (ARC; Russian: Англо-русский комитет единства) was an organization created as a body of cooperation between Soviet and British trade unions. Officially it was formed in April 1925 on the initiative of the trade unions of the USSR at the Anglo-Soviet trade union conference in London. Formally, the committee was created to "achieve unity in the international trade union movement," to fight against preparations for war and "strengthen the struggle against the offensive of capital on the working class." The organization was in conflict with the British General Council of Trade Unions: the conflict ended in September 1927, when - in connection with the rupture of diplomatic relations between Britain and the USSR - the committee was liquidated.

== Literature ==
- Twiss T. M. Trotsky and the Problem of Soviet Bureaucracy. — Haymarket Books, 2015. — 502 p. — (Historical Materialism Book Series, ISSN 1570-1522, Vol. 67). — ISBN 9781608464784. — ISBN 1608464784.
- Calhoun D. F. The United Front: The TUC and the Russians 1923—1928. — Cambridge University Press, 1976. — 514 p. — (Cambridge Russian, Soviet and Post-Soviet Studies, Vol. 18; Soviet and East European studies). — ISBN 9780521210560. — ISBN 0521210569. — ISBN 9780521089692. — ISBN 0521089697.
