= Thomas Wright =

Thomas Wright may refer to:

== Entertainment ==
- Thomas Wright (writer) (fl. 1604), English writer
- Thomas Wright (engraver) (1792–1849), British engraver and portrait painter
- Thomas Wright (antiquarian) (1810–1877), British antiquarian and writer
- Thomas Wright (social commentator) (1839–1909), English social commentator
- Thomas J. Wright, film and television director, active since 1986
- Thomas Lee Wright (born 1953), American writer and filmmaker
- Thomas M. Wright (born 1983), Australian actor/director

== Politics ==
- Thomas Wright (lord mayor) (died 1798), Lord Mayor of London in 1785
- Thomas C. Wright (born 1948), American politician
- Thomas E. Wright (born 1955), North Carolina House of Representatives
- Thomas Wright (Utah politician), American politician

== Science ==
- Thomas Wright (astronomer) (1711–1786), English astronomer and mathematician
- Thomas Wright (geologist) (1809–1884), Scottish surgeon and paleontologist
- Thomas Wright (mathematical instrument maker) (1693-1767), English mathematical instrument maker
- Thomas H. Wright (1873–1928), American teacher and electrician
- Thomas J. Wright (American scholar), international relations scholar

== Sports ==
- Thomas Wright (cricketer, born 1842) (1842–?), English cricketer
- Thomas Wright (cricketer, born 1900) (1900–1962), English cricketer
- Thomas Wright (rugby) (1924–1990), Scottish rugby union and rugby league player

== Other ==
- Thomas Wright (controversialist) (died 1624), English Roman Catholic priest and controversialist
- Thomas Wright (philanthropist) (1789–1875), British prison philanthropist
- Thomas Charles Wright (1799–?), Irish-born admiral, founding-father of Ecuadorian Navy
- Thomas Edward Wright, soldier and penal administrator, commandant at Norfolk Island 1827–28
- Thomas F. Wright (1830–1873), American Union Brevet brigadier general during Civil War
- Thomas Yates Wright (1869–1964), British planter, cricketer, and legislator in Ceylon
- Thomas A. Wright Sr. (1920–2014), American civil rights leader
- Thomas Guthrie Wright (1777–1849), Scottish lawyer and antiquarian
- Thomas Wright (surveyor general) (1740–1812), surveyor general for Prince Edward Island

== See also ==
- Tom Wright (disambiguation)
- Tommy Wright (disambiguation)
- Wright
