= Penny reading =

Type of public entertainment in 19th century UK

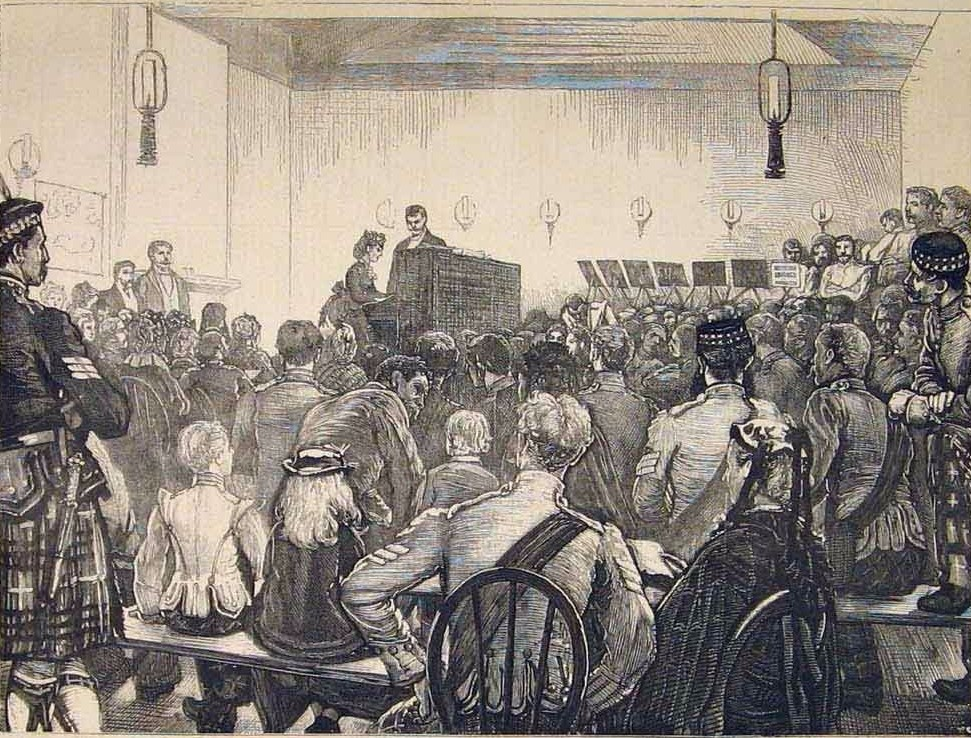
A penny reading for the 71st (Highland) Regiment of Foot at Aldershot, 1871

The penny reading was a form of popular public entertainment that arose in the United Kingdom in the middle of the 19th century, consisting of readings and other performances, for which the admission charged was one penny.

== Impact ==
Under the heading of "rational recreation", the penny reading proved to be accessible and was taken up by working class audiences. It built on the tradition of the penny gaff and "singing saloon". Writing in the mid-1860s, Thomas Wright as itinerant social observer found penny readings "exceedingly popular all over the country".

Australian historian Joy Damousi documented the criticism by Thomas Carlyle and John Ruskin of this passive consumption of literature through reading aloud, fitting as it did into Victorian culture and in particular poetry recitation. Penny readings, however, appealed for a period in both urban and country settings. They were significant as a way forward for the Mechanics' Institutes set up in the early Victorian period, where they became a staple activity, along with smoking concerts and study for scientific qualifications. In the fictionalised Candleford Green of Flora Thompson, the penny reading, although outmoded elsewhere, was "still going strong" in the 1890s.

== Origins ==
The Public Reading Society founded in the 1850s was the vehicle of Charles John Plumptre, a barrister who turned to the teaching of elocution. Charles Sulley, editor of the Ipswich Express, was credited with starting the penny reading movement in Suffolk during the 1850s. A short history was given in the 1865 standard reading collection edited by Joseph Edwards Carpenter. The Rev. James Fleming of Bath was also credited as the "father of the penny-reading movement", for his numerous public readings.

Another view places the origin in 1854 in the Midlands. Dispatches for The Times from the Crimean War, by William Howard Russell, were read in public in Hanley by Samuel Taylor, a manual worker who was a Mechanics' Institute secretary and later involved in the Staffordshire Sentinel newspaper. From the market square, Taylor moved to the town hall, and in 1856 to a fuller programme of patriotic readings, with music and the national anthem; from free admittance to a penny charge to cut down great demand. The Times made much of the events, which were widely copied in the Potteries and Staffordshire by 1857–8. At the Birmingham and Midland Institute, William Mattieu Williams started to give "penny lectures" in 1856, and C. J. Woodward later claimed that these led to "penny classes" and penny readings, in the cause of popular education.

In 1871, a book review in the Literary World lamented the trend:

As conducted by their originators, Penny Readings were unquestionably useful and attractive without being frivolous: as conducted by some of those gentlemen's imitators, they [have] run riot and become farcical, and have lost almost every philanthropic or praiseworthy element they at first possessed.

== Content ==
An 1887 handbook for parish priests suggests a programme of around 15 items, "instrumental pieces, songs, glees, recitation, and readings", recommending variety. It notes that "Comic songs should, as a rule, be avoided".

== Legacy ==
Funds raised from Penny Readings were frequently the source of donations to the Royal National Lifeboat Institution (RNLI). Funds raised in Norfolk and Suffolk were organised and collected by E. B. Adams, surgeon of Bungay, Suffolk, and funded the first RNLI lifeboat at Wells-next-the-Sea Lifeboat Station. The lifeboat was initially reported to have been named Penny Readings and Eliza Adams, but all subsequent references record the name as Eliza Adams.

While penny readings, at their height in the 1860s, had lost their popularity before 1900, a tradition of poetry recitation continued in niches such as family events and temperance meetings. Winifred Peck found it "ghastly" and associated, negatively, with the provincial.

The Poetry Society, founded in 1909 as the Poetry Recital Society, began with a parallel mission to the "penny reading movement": event organisation to promote performance of the spoken word. In terms of its content and patrons, on the other hand, it was more discriminating, and lacked the same broad base of appeal.
