= RNLB Cecil Paine =

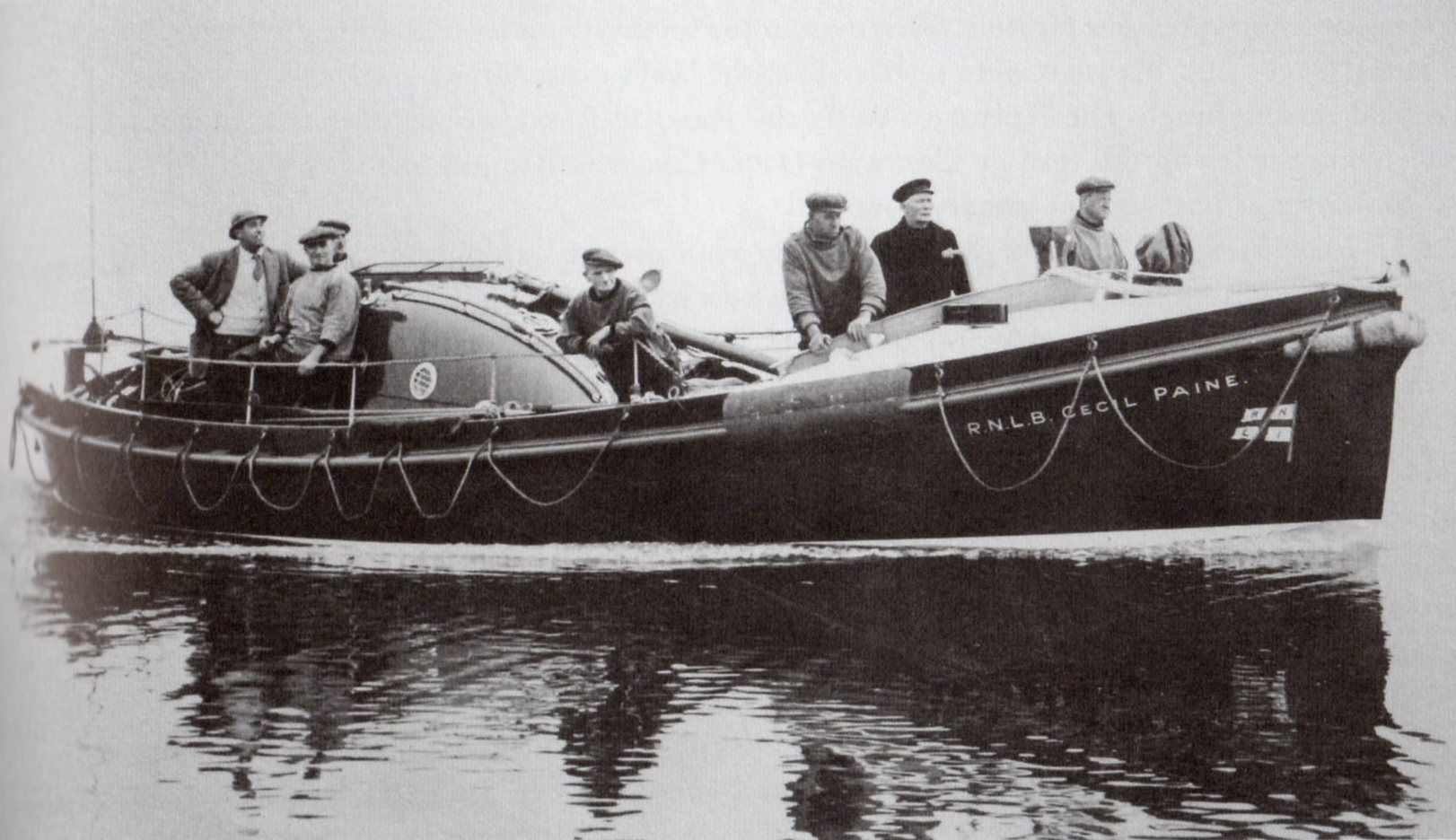
- RNLB Cecil Paine (ON 850)

History

United Kingdom
- Name: Cecil Paine
- Namesake: Named after Cecil Paine
- Owner: Royal National Lifeboat Institution (RNLI)
- Builder: Groves & Guttridge, Cowes, Isle of Wight
- Official Number: ON 850
- Donor: Legacy of A. C. Paine
- Stations: Wells-next-the-Sea
- Cost: £7,462 0s 3d
- Yard number: G&G418
- Acquired: 25 July 1945
- Decommissioned: 1965
- In service: 1945 to 1965 for RNLI; (went on to further service in Portugal)
- Fate: Sold in 1972 to Portuguese Lifeboat service

General characteristics
- Class & type: Liverpool
- Tonnage: 6 tons 10cwt
- Length: 35 ft 6 in (10.82 m) overall
- Beam: 10 ft 8 in (3.25 m)
- Depth: 4 ft 4 in (1.32 m)
- Installed power: Twin 18bhp Weyburn AE.4 petrol engines, re-engined in 1964 with twin 32 bhp penguin diesels
- Speed: 7.42 kn (13.74 km/h)
- Notes: Fitted with single mast and carried two oars

RNLB Cecil Paine (ON 850) is a retired Liverpool-class non-self-righting lifeboat of the Royal National Lifeboat Institution. It was the second motor lifeboat to be stationed in the English coastal town of Wells-next-the-Sea in the county of Norfolk in the United Kingdom, and was on station at Wells from 25 July 1945 until she was sold in June 1965.

== New design ==
It had been decided in November 1941 by the district inspector that Wells station should be sent a new Liverpool-class motor lifeboat, but the Second World War delayed the new lifeboat's arrival on station. The RNLI wanted to place one of their new twin-engine Liverpool-class lifeboats at Wells. The prototype of the twin-engined design had been laid down in 1940, but the boatyard was bombed by the Germans, destroying this lifeboat, which delayed further development work by some time. Wells finally received their new lifeboat in 1945, and the station was one of the first to receive the new design of lifeboat.

=== Description ===
Cecil Paine was built by Groves and Guttridge at their boatyard in Cowes on the Isle of Wight for the cost of £7,462. She was powered by twin 18 bhp Weyburn AE.4 petrol engines, although she also had been fitted with single mast for sailing and she carried two oars. The engines were housed amidships beneath a large whaleback in the open cockpit of the lifeboat. This canopy also served the dual purpose of providing some weather protection and shelter for the crew and the rescued. The hull was divided into six watertight compartments with 129 separate air cases. The lifeboat's self-bailing capabilities consisted of 18 relieving scuppers, which could free the hull of water entirely in an estimated 20 seconds. The Cecil Paine had a top speed of 7.42 kn (13.74 km/h) and a cruising speed of 7.0 kn (13.0 km/h). The lifeboat weighed nearly 8 tons, and she was launched with a specially supplied tractor. The lifeboat had been paid for by a donation from the Legacy of a Mr A. C. Paine. After completing all her sea trials, she officially took her place on station on 25 July 1945.

== Service ==
=== Attempted theft ===
Six months after the Cecil Paine arrived in Wells there was an attempt to steal her from her station. Situated at nearby RAF Matlaske there was a small German prisoner of War camp. Seven German POW's impatient to get home to Germany, stole a lorry in the village and had driven it to Wells. Their plan was to steal the Cecil Paine and sail home across the North Sea back to the Continent. As they travelled along Beach Road in Wells, a local garage man by the name of Mr S Abel was suspicious of the erratically driven lorry with no lights on. He promptly reported this to the local police. When the POWs got to the lifeboat station they broke open a window and tried to start the engine of the lifeboat but gave up the attempt. The men were arrested by the police when they returned to the stolen lorry to make their getaway.

=== First service ===
Cecil Paine's first service took place on 9 February 1947. The lifeboat was called out to aid the MV Spirality of London. The ship was anchored two and half miles north-east of Wells Harbour in a strong easterly breeze and very rough sea. The Spirality was dragging the three anchors she had down. The lifeboat stood by until a tug arrived at 6 a.m. which took the Spirality in tow and set course for King's Lynn. The lifeboat then returned to her station.

=== SS Zor ===
One of Cecil Paine's significant service took place on 18 May 1955 which involved the rescue of the crew members of the Turkish steamship Zor of Istanbul. The ship carrying a cargo of timber started listing after her cargo shifted in the bad weather. The vessel was four miles north-west of the Dudgeon lightvessel. The first of two lifeboats to respond to the stricken ship was the Cecil Paine. By this time there was a northerly gale blowing with squalls of sleet. The Zor was listing about forty degrees to starboard. The ship's cargo of timber had shifted some more and began to spill into the sea. The captain's wife and some of the crew had already left the ship and had gone aboard the steamship Richmond Queen which had been standing by. After her arrival, Cecil Paine managed to rescue several more of the crew, but four men decided to stay aboard to try to save the vessel. Cecil Paine, which was now running low on fuel, had to return to her station. RNLB Forester's Centenary (ON 786) arrived at the scene to relive her. By the time the lifeboat arrived it was clear to Coxswain West of the Sheringham boat, that the Zor was sinking. Coxswain West asked the captain to abandon ship, but he refused. The tug Serviceman arrived on the scene with the intention of taking the Zor in tow. Almost immediately after the tow began, the ship began to list violently. With this turn of events the captain asked the lifeboat to help them abandon ship. To extract the remaining four men, Coxswain West maneuvered the lifeboat to the exposed port side of the ship, were a rope was hanging over the side. West steered the lifeboat in to the ship's side and held position whilst the crew slid down the rope to safety on the lifeboat. Within ten minutes of the extraction, the ship sank below the waves. For their parts in this rescue, both coxswains, William Cox of Wells and West of Sheringham, were accorded Thanks of the Institution on Vellum.

=== SS Wimbledon ===
In the following years the lifeboat was involved in several more services and rescues including another joint rescue with Sheringham lifeboat on 31 October 1956 to the SS Wimbledon. Coxswain West of Sheringham had radioed that his Lifeboat's fuel supply was running low and Cecil Paine was launched to the SS Eleanor Brook to collect the seriously ill mate of the Wimbledon who had been taken aboard the Eleanor Brook and to deliver fuel to the Foresters' Centenary. In the meantime a Helicopter from RAF Horsham St Faith had landed a doctor aboard the Eleanor Brook to attend to the mate. the doctor made attempts to resuscitate the mate but this proved unsuccessful and he was pronounced dead. The Cecil Paine arrived and collected the doctor and the dead mate and re-fueled the Foresters' Centenary and then returned to the Wells station.

=== Overhaul ===
In June 1962 Cecil Paine was sent to Fletchers Boatyard in Lowestoft, where she underwent an overhaul. A reserve lifeboat called RNLB Lucy Lavers (ON 832) was sent to Wells as cover. The reserve lifeboat was a single-engined Liverpool class lifeboat which had been built in 1939 and had served at Aldeburgh No.2 station. Cecil Paine returned to Wells in October 1962.

=== Seamu ===
Back on station Cecil Paine saw one of her more notable services on 18 May 1963. In the late evening and in increasingly difficult weather conditions, the cabin cruiser Seamu of Frinton-on-Sea had run aground just of the entrance to Blakeney harbour. Aboard the cruiser there was a crew of two. The boat was facing with her stern to the rough sea after the anchor had fouled, and the seas were breaking over her and fast filling the little boat. The Cecil Paine was launched with difficulty at 10:05 p.m. requiring her tractor and carriage to wade into deep water to reach a suitable launching depth. The lifeboat arrived on the scene at 10:55 pm but could not get to the Seamu immediately as it touched bottom on the sandbank. By 11:00 pm, and following some manoeuvring by Second Coxswain Frank Taylor, the lifeboat was able to cross the sandbank. Using his anchor the Coxswain was able to veer down on the cruiser and after four attempts he was able to release the lifeboat's anchor to get alongside the cruiser. In the increasing west-north-west gale-force winds and for a brief time Cecil Paine was able two pull the crew of two off the vessel but she sustained some damage whilst she was alongside. The lifeboat pulled clear from the cruiser, which then was driven onto the shore with no hope of saving her. The lifeboat returned to her station at 3:15 a.m. on 19 May. As a result of this outstanding service, Second Coxswain Frank Taylor was awarded a bronze medal. E. W. Hicks, Bowman John Cox, Mechanic James Cox, Assistant Mechanic Alan Cox, Ronnie Taylor, Barry Leggatt and Alan Cooper all received medal service certificates.

=== Inshore lifeboat arrives ===
On 14 June 1963 Wells lifeboat station was allocated an inshore lifeboat which would work alongside the Cecil Paine. The ILB was a small inflatable rubber craft powered by a 40 bhp outboard motor and was only the third of this type to enter service with RNLI. She cost £280 and was sent to the station in response to the increasing incidents which were happing along this coast in sight of the coastline and in moderate weather conditions.

=== Re-engined ===
With the arrival of the ILB and the Lucy Lavers, once more in reserve on the station, Cecil Paine was sent off to Lowestoft on 14 July 1963. This time she was to be re-engined with new 32 bhp Parsons Penguin diesel engines. following this re-fit Cecil Paine returned to Wells on 27 April 1964.

=== Last service ===
The last service attended by Cecil Paine took place on 29 August 1964. The lifeboat was launched in response to a red flare which had been fired from a yacht half a mile west of Blakeney Harbour. When Cecil Paine arrived on the scene it was to find that the flare was raised by the crew of a small auxiliary yacht sloop called Kiskadee. The Kiskadee had now run aground on a sandbank and was described as lying beam to in confusing currents. Using the same tactics that had been used in the rescue of Seamu, the lifeboat used its anchor to veer down on the yacht. The lifeboat was unable to reach the yacht even with its anchor cable fully paid out. The anchor was raised and two more attempts were made to reach the yacht. On the last attempt the Cecil Paine hit bottom.

By now the yacht had been washed over the sand bar and was in smoother waters and out of danger. Shortly after, the rise in the tide saw the lifeboat break clear of the sandbank and once again she tried to assist the yacht. Once again the rough breaking seas proved to thwart this rescue attempt. By now the inshore lifeboat had arrived and had taken the Kiskadee under tow. The Cecil Paine stood by and then she returned to her station.

== Disposal ==
In June 1965 a new lifeboat arrived at Wells, and in July Cecil Paine left Wells and was taken to Tyrell's Yard in Arklow, County Wicklow on the east coast of Ireland. There she was once again given a complete overhaul and a survey was done of her. Once this work was completed, the lifeboat was sent to the Irish lifeboat station of Kilmore Quay in County Wexford, Ireland. The Cecil Paine went on station there until 1972 and whilst there she performed 22 rescues. In July she was finally sold out of the service and was acquired by the Portuguese Lifeboat Society for the sum of £4,300. The Portuguese renamed her Patreo-Joao-Rangel and she continued her role as a lifeboat in the town of Sesimbra until she was finally retired in the late 1990s.

== Coxswains of the Cecil Paine ==
During the period of time that Cecil Paine was on station at Wells there were three coxswains, and they were as follows

- Theodore T.L. Nielsen, 1933 to 1947
- William Rushmore Cox, 1947 t0 1959
- David James Cox, 1960 to 1986

== Service and rescues ==
Cecil Paine ON850
Date	Casualty	Lives saved
1947
9 February	Motor vessel Spirality, of London, stood by	
1948
25 July	Royal Fleet Auxiliary tanker Wave Commander, of London, Landed injured man	
1949
28 January	Motor fishing vessel Sally of Wells, saved boat	2
16 July	Royal Army Service Corps motor vessel Fagin, gave help	
30 September	Fishing boats Spero and Blanche, of Wells, escorted	
1951
4 July	Nine fishing boats, of Wells, escorted	
1954
9 December	Motor Barge Gold, of Rochester, in tow of lifeboat RNLB Foresters' Centenary, of Sheringham, gave help	
1955
18 May	Steamship Zor, of Istanbul, gave help	5
1956
22 March	Motor fishing boat Harvester, of Wells, saved boat	2
28 May	Yacht Wire, of Glasgow, saved yacht	1
29 July	Yacht Elleana, of Great Yarmouth, saved yacht	5
31 October	Steamship Eleoner Brooke of London, Landed a Doctor and the Body of the mate of steamship Wimbledon, of London. RNLB Foresters' Centenary, of Sheringham, gave help RNLB Foresters' Centenary, of Sheringham, escorted lifeboat	
1957
5 June	Converted ship's boat Sailfish, saved boat	1
1961
14 July	Converted ship's boat Boy John, saved boat	2
1962; Off Station reserve Lifeboat Lucy Lavers on station
1963
18 May	Cabin cruiser Seamus, of Frinton	2
1963 to 1964; Off Station reserve Lifeboat Lucy Lavers on station
1964
2 July	Fishing boat Blanche, of Wells, gave help	
19 August	Fishing boat Blanche and Sally of Wells, escorted	
29 August	Sloop yacht Kiskadee, gave help	
1965 to 1972
	On station at Kilmore Quay Lifeboat Station	
1972 to 1990s
	Sold to Portuguese Lifeboat Service; Name changed to Patreo-Joao-Rangel	

Preceded by RNLB Royal Silver Jubilee (ON 780)	RNLB Cecil Paine (ON 850); 1945 to 1965	Succeeded by RNLB Ernest Tom Neathercoat (ON 982)
