= Wells-next-the-Sea Lifeboat Station =

RNLI Lifeboat station in Norfolk, UK

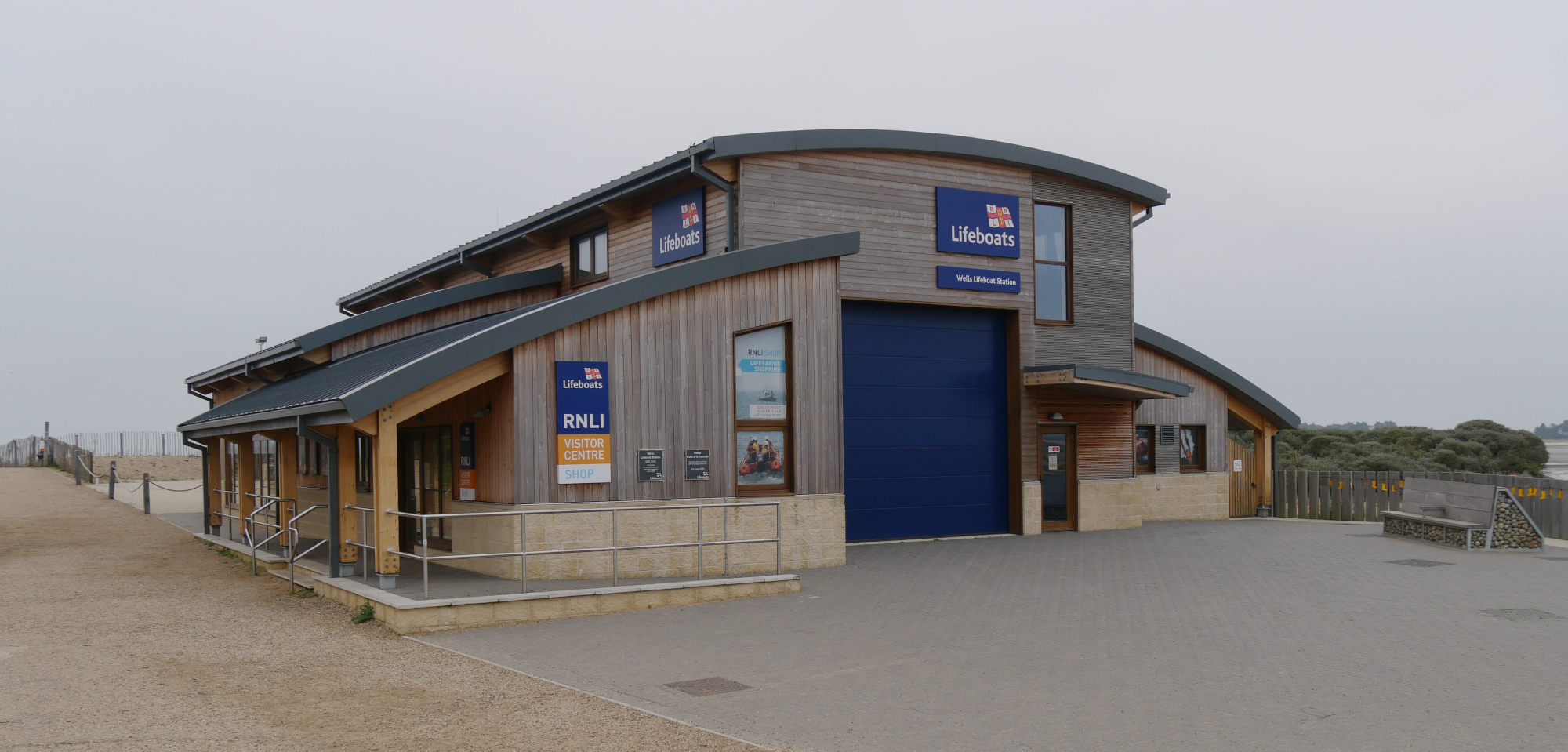
- Wells lifeboat station

- Location within Norfolk

General information
- Type: RNLI Lifeboat Station
- Architectural style: Steelframe Boathouse with brick and block construction
- Location: Wells Lifeboat Station, Beach Road, Wells-next-the-Sea, Norfolk, NR23 1DR, England
- Coordinates: 52°58′22.4″N 0°51′01.7″E
- Opened: NSA 1830–1851; RNLI 1869–present
- Owner: Royal National Lifeboat Institution

Website
- Wells-next-the-Sea RNLI Lifeboat Station

Listed Building – Grade II
- Feature: Lifeboat house (1869)
- Designated: 8 September 1993
- Reference no.: 1277330

Wells-next-the-Sea Lifeboat Station is located at the end of Beach Road, about 1 mi (1.6 km) north of the town of Wells-next-the-Sea, on the north coast of the English county of Norfolk.

A lifeboat station was first established at Wells-next-the-Sea by the Norfolk Shipwreck Association (NSA) in 1830, but closed in 1851. The station was re-established by the Royal National Lifeboat Institution (RNLI) in 1869.

The station currently operates the All-weather Shannon-class lifeboat, 13-46 Duke of Edinburgh (Civil Service No.53) (ON 1161), on station since 2023, and the smaller D-class (IB1) Inshore lifeboat, Peter Wilcox (D-797), on station since 2016. The newly constructed boathouse (2022) is located at the beach on the western side of Wells Harbour mouth.

== History ==
=== 1800s: earliest rescue services ===
Early sea rescues in Wells were performed by private citizens who often attempted to use their rescue efforts to claim salvage rights to the rescued vessel for their own profit. The first organised rescue service at Wells was run by the Norfolk Shipwreck Association (NSA) and began in 1830, when an existing unnamed lifeboat was sent to Wells from Cromer Lifeboat Station. Wells (NSA) lifeboat station was in operation until 1851.

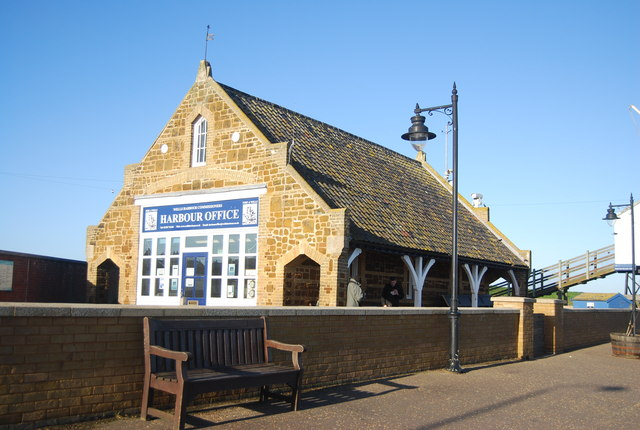
Wells-next-the-Sea 1869 RNLI boathouse, now used as the Harbour Masters Office and a Maritime Museum. It is a Grade II listed building.

With dwindling finances, and lifeboats in a declining state of repair, a meeting of the NSA on 21 November 1857 decided that the existing operations be transferred to the management of the RNLI, which was formally agreed at a meeting of the RNLI committee of management on Thursday 3 December 1857.

By the 1860s, maritime incidents off the shores of North Norfolk were rising. In 1868 the residents of Wells partnered with the RNLI to re-establish a lifeboat service in the town. A boathouse was constructed on the Wells quay to accommodate a self-righting RNLI lifeboat, the RNLB Eliza Adams. The station officially opened in 1869 and was used until 1895, when the station was relocated to be closer to the open sea. The old boathouse at the harbour is still standing; a Grade II listed building, it is used jointly as the Harbour Masters Office and a maritime museum.

=== 1880s: Wells lifeboat disaster and Emma rescue ===
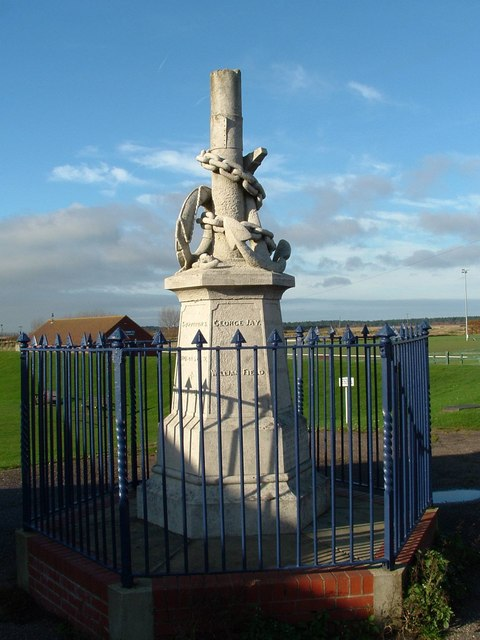
Memorial: Wells lifeboat disaster of 29 October 1880

On 29 October 1880, the 171-ton brig Ocean Queen was caught in a gale and sought shelter at Wells-next-the-Sea. At 1:00 pm, the Eliza Adams launched to the aid of another brig, the Sharon Rose, which had run ashore on the beach at nearby Holkham. Seven sailors were rescued and the lifeboat returned to Wells, where it discovered the Ocean Queen close to the harbour entrance, flying a distress flag. After a partial crew change, the Eliza Adams returned to sea to assist the Ocean Queen, which had been driven ashore nearby. The lifeboat was unable to assist and returned to port, but was swamped by a large wave and capsized; 11 of the lifeboat's 13 crewmen drowned. The crew of the Ocean Queen remained aboard their vessel, and were able to walk ashore once the storm had abated and the tide receded.

On 4 October 1883, a gale blew the schooner Emma of Jersey onto the East Bar near Wells, stranding her. Wells lifeboat RNLB Charlotte Nicholls was launched to assist. The Emma was heavily damaged, so the Charlotte Nicholls took her five crewmen back to Wells.

=== 1890s: new location ===
By the 1890s, it had become evident that the location of the 1869 boathouse was problematic. At low water the lifeboat could not get out into the open sea and was overly reliant on the tide. In 1893, the lifeboat RNLB Baltic (ON 198) was launched for three rescues, but arrived too late to provide actual assistance at any of them. Construction began on a new station 1.2 miles (1.9 km) north of the existing station in 1894 and was completed in October 1895. The Baltic (ON 198) was replaced by a vessel bearing the same name, the RNLB Baltic (ON 375).

=== 1930s–1970s: motor and inshore lifeboats ===
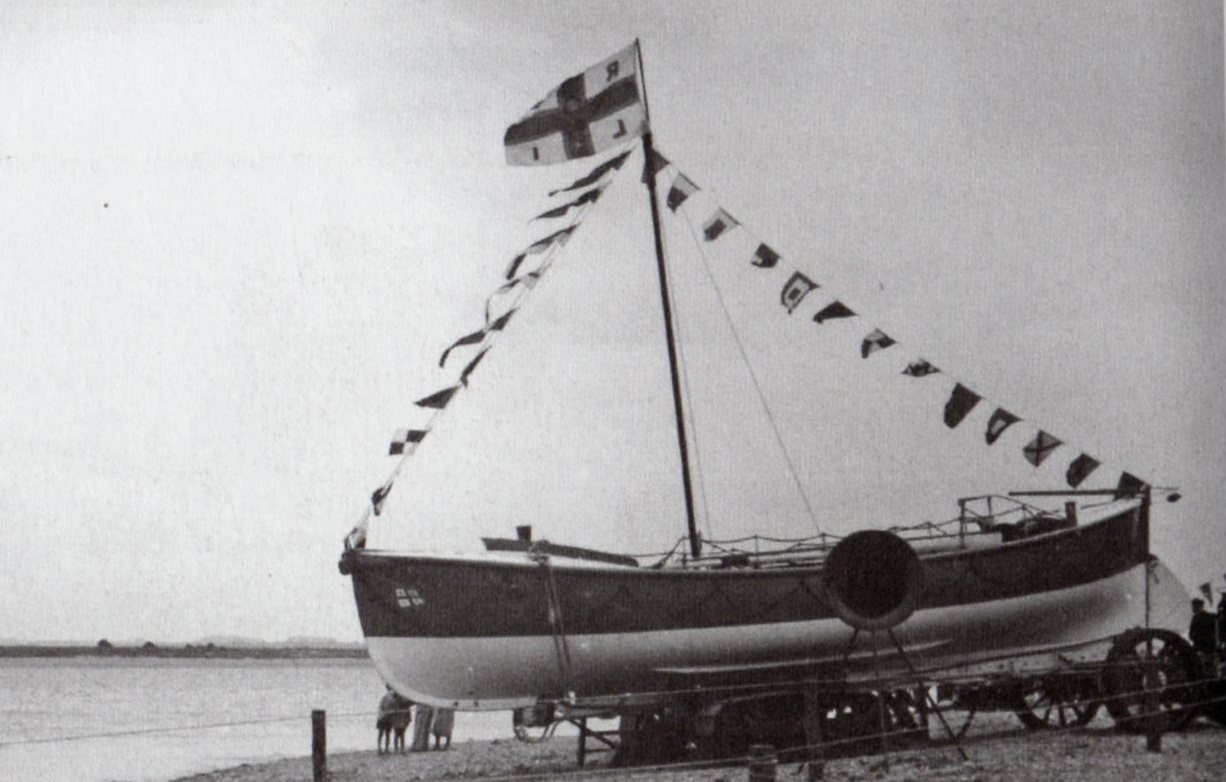
The Surf-class motor lifeboat RNLB Royal Silver Jubilee (ON 780) was the first motor lifeboat at Wells

Although motor lifeboats had been available since at least 1911, Wells was not provided with one until 1936 because of the need for an appropriate boat launch. The station received a Surf-class lifeboat, the RNLB Royal Silver Jubilee (ON 780), which had been designed by James Barnett and was light enough for the beach launch required at Wells. She was also the first Surf-class to be propelled by a basic water jet system, which was ideal for the shallow water at Wells.

On 5 January 1946, seven men stole a lorry, and drove to the lifeboat house. There, they forced a window, and attempted to start the boat's engines. Their efforts failed, but they had already been spotted, and were arrested on returning to the lorry. They turned out to be German prisoners of war, who had been working clearing coastal defences, and had seen the lifeboat launch earlier on exercise.

By the mid-1960s, the North Norfolk coast had seen an increased use of marine incidents resulting from pleasure boating and beachgoing. A D-class (RFD PB16) Inshore lifeboat (D-11) was placed at Wells in 1963.

Over 18 and 19 May 1963, the cabin cruiser Seamu had run aground at low tide at the entrance to Blakeney harbour. The Cecil Paine was launched to assist, arriving on scene at 10:50 pm. Seas were rough and winds were high. The coxswain made several attempts to approach, but sandbanks and high winds made it difficult. After four attempts, the two crewmen of the Seamu were finally taken aboard the Cecil Paine to safety. The coxswain was awarded an RNLI Bronze Medal.

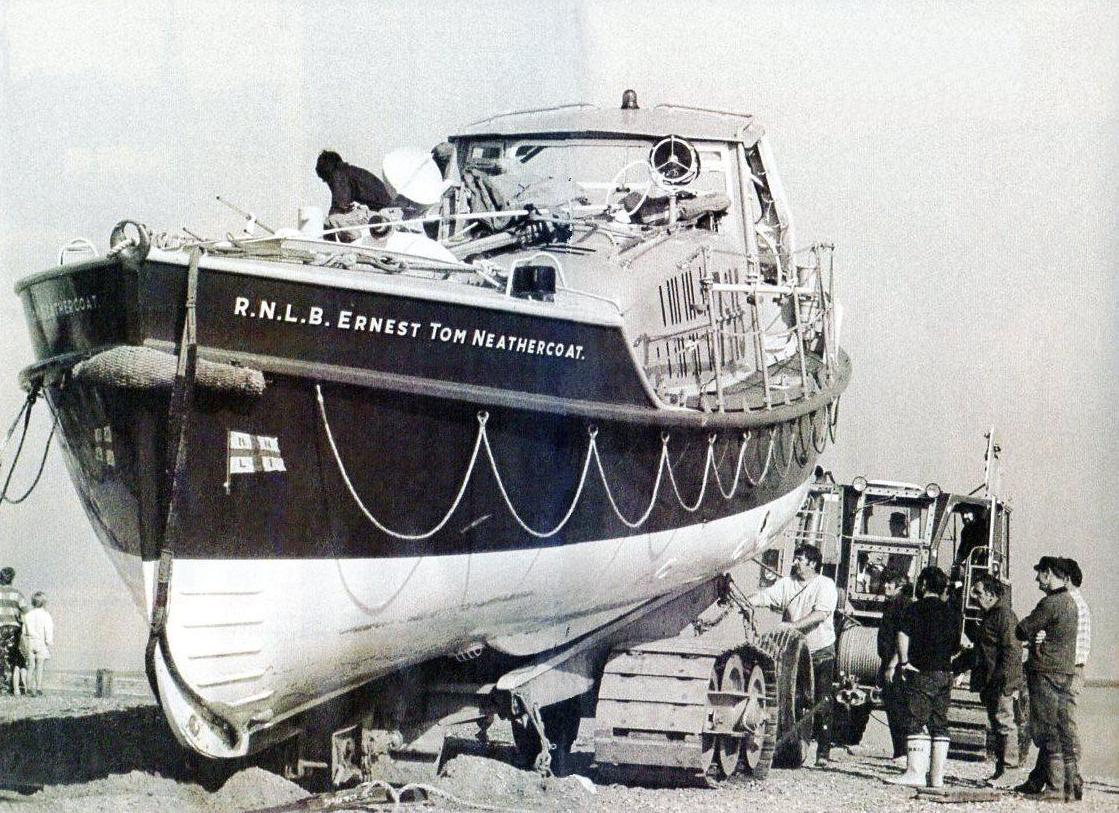
RNLB Ernest Tom Neathercoat (ON 982), service dates 1965–1990

Until 1976, the inshore service was provided by a series of unnamed D-class (RFD PB16) lifeboats. The first inshore boat at Wells to have a name was RNLB Spirit of Rotary (D-246), which was on the station from 1976 until 1987. In January 1978 a severe storm destroyed the IRB house and damaged the doors to the main boathall. A new IRB house was built onto the side of the main station.

On the morning of 15 February 1979, gale force nine to ten winds were blowing blizzard conditions across the North Sea. The Merchant Vessel Savinesti of Romania had broken down; dragging her anchor, she was in imminent danger of running aground 37 miles (60 km) south-west of Spurn Point. Wells lifeboat Ernest Tom Neathercoat was launched to service that morning, but struggled to make headway through temperatures well below freezing and rough seas which eventually knocked out her radar, MF radio and echo-sounding systems. She eventually arrived and stood by the Savinesti for two hours until the arrival of the Arun-class lifeboat RNLB City of Bradford IV (ON 1052) out of Humber Lifeboat Station, which was to take over the service. By this point, the winds had increased to hurricane force 12, waves were up to 40 feet high, and it was still snowing heavily. At this time the Wells lifeboat was released from the service and sent back to Wells, arriving between 6:00 and 7:00 pm after approximately 11 hours at sea. The coxswain was awarded an RNLI Silver Medal.

=== 1980s–1990s: Station improvements and Mersey-class ===
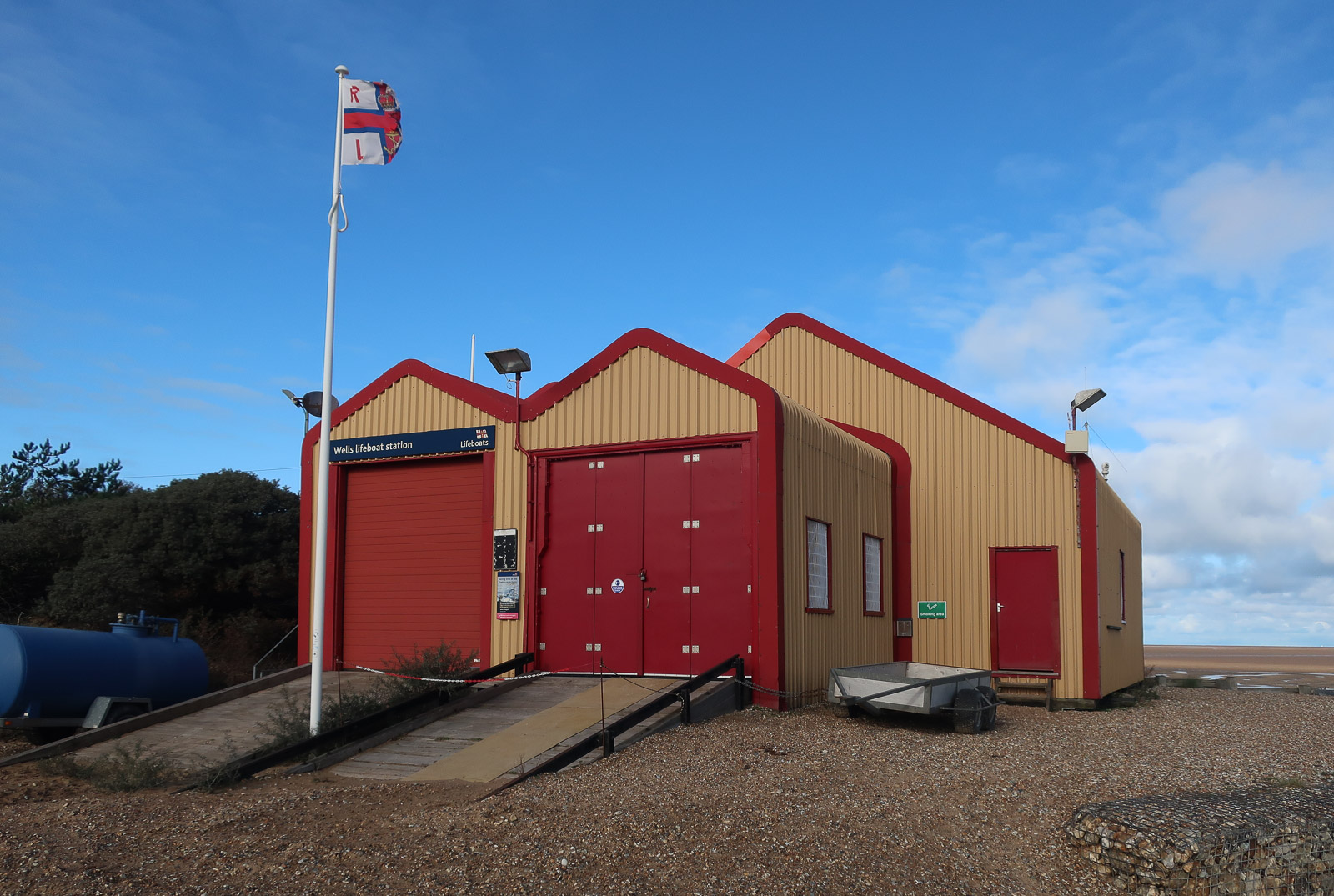
1895 Wells lifeboat house

The 1895 beach road station was improved and renovated on several occasions, but the bulk of the structure had remained original. The crew facilities were expanded with an additional level in 1983, and a boathouse extension was added in 1986 to house the inshore lifeboat.

In 1990 the station was allocated a new Mersey-class lifeboat, the 12-003 Doris M. Mann of Ampthill (ON 1161), prompting significant alterations to the boathouse in order to accommodate it. The house had to be almost completely re-built whilst retaining the historic integrity of the 1895 structure. In the mid 1990s work was also carried out to combat coastal erosion on the sandy headland where the boat house is located. This was achieved by re-using greenheart timbers re-claimed after the demolition of the Eastbourne slipway. Extra new groynes were also installed to retain the beach in front of the station, vital for the continued beach launching of the lifeboats.

=== 2020s: New Boathouse and Shannon-class ===
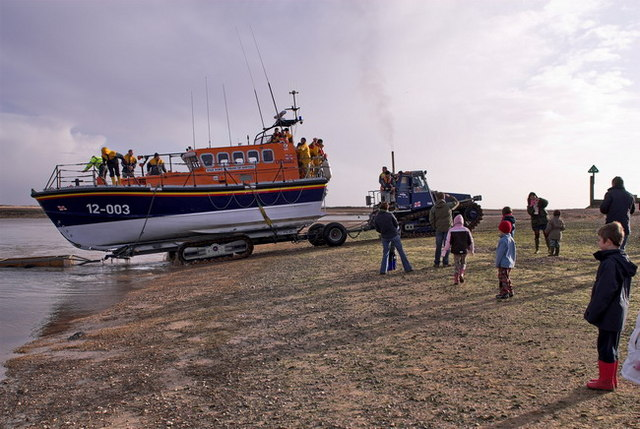
The Mersey-class lifeboat RNLB Doris M. Mann of Ampthill (ON 1161) arrived on station in 1990

A new bigger boathouse was required to house the soon to arrive new Shannon-class lifeboat for Wells-next-the Sea, to be built to the west of the existing boathouse, parts of which are more than 125 years old. Work on the construction of the new boathouse started in September 2020, and was completed in October 2022.

Demolition of the 1895 boathouse soon followed in November 2022.

Part funded by a successful local campaign in 2014–2015 and part by the Civil Service charity The Lifeboat Fund, Shannon-class 13-46 Duke of Edinburgh (Civil Service No.53) (ON 1353) arrived at Wells-next-the-Sea in October 2022, replacing Doris M. Mann of Ampthill (ON 1161) in early 2023.

== Station honours ==
The following are awards made at Wells-next-the-Sea:

- RNLI Silver Medal
  David James Cox, Coxswain – 1979
- RNLI Bronze Medal
  Francis Robert Taylor, DSM, Second Coxswain – 1963
  David James Cox, Coxswain – 1982
- The Thanks of the Institution inscribed on Vellum
  T. Neilsen, Coxswain – 1942
  William Cox, Coxswain – 1955
  David J. Cox, Coxswain – 1964
  Albert Court, Motor Mechanic – 1971
  David J. Cox, Coxswain – 1973
  Allen Frary, Coxswain – 2001
  Robert Smith, Second Coxswain – 2001
- A Framed Letter of Thanks signed by the Chairman of the Institution
  The Coxswain and Crew – 1966
  David J. Cox BEM, Coxswain – 1983
  Graham Walker, Coxswain/Mechanic – 1992
  James Case, crew member – 1992
  Graham Walker, Coxswain/Mechanic – 1993
  Allen Frary, Second Coxswain – 1993
  All the all-weather lifeboat crew and shore helpers – 1996
  Allen Frary, Coxswain/Mechanic – 2003
- British Empire Medal
  David James Cox – 1981QBH
- Member, Order of the British Empire (MBE)
  Philip Eaglen – 2021NYH
  Sheila Joyce Warner, Vice Chair, Wells Lifeboat Guild – 2025NYH

== Roll of honour ==
In memory of those lost whilst serving Wells-next-the-Sea lifeboat:

- Lost when the lifeboat Eliza Adams capsized on service to the brig Ocean Queen, 29 October 1880.

Robert William Elsdon, Coxswain (62)
Francis Abel (26)
John Elsden (60)
William Field (33)
William Green (56)
Charles Hines (30)

George Jay (46)
Charles Smith
Samuel Smith (33)
John Stacey (21)
William Wordingham (29)

== Wells-next-the-Sea lifeboats ==
=== Norfolk Shipwreck Association lifeboat ===
ON (Note: ON is the RNLI's Official Number of the boat.)	Name	Built	On station	Class	Comments
Unnamed	1804	1830–1851	25-foot Greathead	(Note: 25-foot x 8-foot 6in (10-oared) Greathead-class non-self-righting lifeboat, funded by the NSA, built by Henry Greathead of South Shields); Previously at Cromer.	

=== RNLI lifeboats ===
==== Pulling and Sailing (P&S) lifeboats ====
ON	Name	Built	On station	Class	Comments
Pre-525	Eliza Adams	1869	1869–1880	33-foot Peake Self-righting (P&S)	(Note: 33-foot x 8-foot 6in (10-oared) Peake-class self-righting (P&S) lifeboat, gift of the Penny reading LB fund, via Dr Adams of Bungay, built by Woolfe of Shadwell, London, costing £281.)
Pre-658	Charlotte Nicholls	1881	1881–1888	37-foot Self-Righting (P&S)	(Note: 37-foot x 9-foot (12-oared) self-righting (P&S) lifeboat, legacy of Miss C. Nicholls of Finsbury Park, built by Woolfe of Shadwell, London, costing £430.)
198	Baltic	1888	1888–1895	37-foot Self-Righting (P&S)	(Note: 37-foot x 8-foot (12-oared) self-righting (P&S) lifeboat, funded by the Baltic Exchange LB fund, built by D. and W. Henderson and Company of Partick, costing £564.)
375	Baltic	1895	1895–1913	35-foot 3in Cromer	(Note: 35-foot 3in x 10-foot 3in (14-oared) Cromer-class non-self-righting lifeboat, funded by the Baltic Exchange LB fund, built by James Beeching of Great Yarmouth, costing £450.)
425	Reserve No.9B	1899	1913–1916	35-foot Liverpool (P&S)	(Note: 35-foot x 10-foot 9in (10/12-oared) Liverpool-class non-self-righting (P&S) lifeboat, legacy of Mr J. Stevens of Birmingham, built by James Beeching of Great Yarmouth, costing £544 when new.); Previously James Stevens No. 8 at Ardrossan.
665	Baltic	1916	1916–1936	38-foot Liverpool (P&S)	(Note: 38-foot x 10-foot 9in (14-oared) Liverpool-class non-self-righting (P&S) lifeboat, funded by the Baltic Exchange LB fund, built by S. E. Saunders of East Cowes, costing £2,233.)

Pre ON numbers are unofficial numbers used by the Lifeboat Enthusiasts' Society to reference early lifeboats not included on the official RNLI list.

==== Motor lifeboats ====
ON	Op. No. (Note: Op. No. is the RNLI's Operational Number of the boat carried on the hull.)	Name	On station	Class	Comments
780	–	Royal Silver Jubilee	1936–1945	Surf	
850	–	Cecil Paine	1945–1965	Liverpool	
832	–	Lucy Lavers	1962	Liverpool	(Relief fleet)
832	–	Lucy Lavers	1963–1964	Liverpool	(Relief fleet)
982	37-15	Ernest Tom Neathercoat	1965–1990	Oakley	
961	37-03	Calouste Gulbenkian	1978–1979	Oakley	(Relief fleet)
961	37-03	Calouste Gulbenkian	1983	Oakley	(Relief fleet)
961	37-03	Calouste Gulbenkian	1987–1988	Oakley	(Relief fleet)
1161	12-003	Doris M. Mann of Ampthill	1990–2023	Mersey	
1124	12-001	Peggy and Alex Caird	1998	Mersey	(Relief fleet)
1162	12-004	Royal Shipwright	2003	Mersey	(Relief fleet)
1353	13-46	Duke of Edinburgh (Civil Service No.53)	2023–	Shannon	

==== Inshore lifeboats ====
Op. No.	Name	On station	Class	Comments
D-11	Unnamed	1963–1964	D-class (RFD PB16)	
D-9	Unnamed	1964–1965	D-class (RFD PB16)	
D-29	Unnamed	1965	D-class (RFD PB16)	
D-8	Unnamed	1965–1966	D-class (RFD PB16)	
D-82	Unnamed	1966–1968	D-class (RFD PB16)	
D-25	Unnamed	1968–1969	D-class (RFD PB16)	
D-113	Unnamed	1969–1976	D-class (RFD PB16)	
D-246	Spirit of Rotary	1976–1987	D-class (Zodiac III)	
D-352	Jane Ann	1988–1996	D-class (EA16)	
D-512	Jane Ann II	1996–2006	D-class (EA16)	
D-661	Jane Ann III	2006–2016	D-class (IB1)	
D-797	Peter Wilcox	2016–	D-class (IB1)	

==== Launch and recovery tractors ====
Op. No.	Reg. No.	Type	On station	Comments
T19	TY 2547	Clayton	1936–1939	
T32	FYE 221	Case L	1939–1954	
T59	FYE 221	Fowler Challenger III	1954–1969	
T68	YUV 742	Fowler Challenger III	1969–1974	
T67	YLD 792	Fowler Challenger III	1974–1979	
T63	PXF 163	Fowler Challenger III	1979–1983	
T72	518 GYM	Case 1000D	1983	
T60	OXO 323	Fowler Challenger III	1983–1985	
T99	C82 NUX	Talus MB-H Crawler	1986–1993	
T91	UAW 558Y	Talus MB-H Crawler	1993–1995	
T99	C82 NUX	Talus MB-H Crawler	1995–2006	
T96	B688 HUJ	Talus MB-H Crawler	2006–2023	
SC-T27	HF22 BWJ	SLARS (Clayton)	2022–	Named Patricia Jean Bettany

== Gallery ==
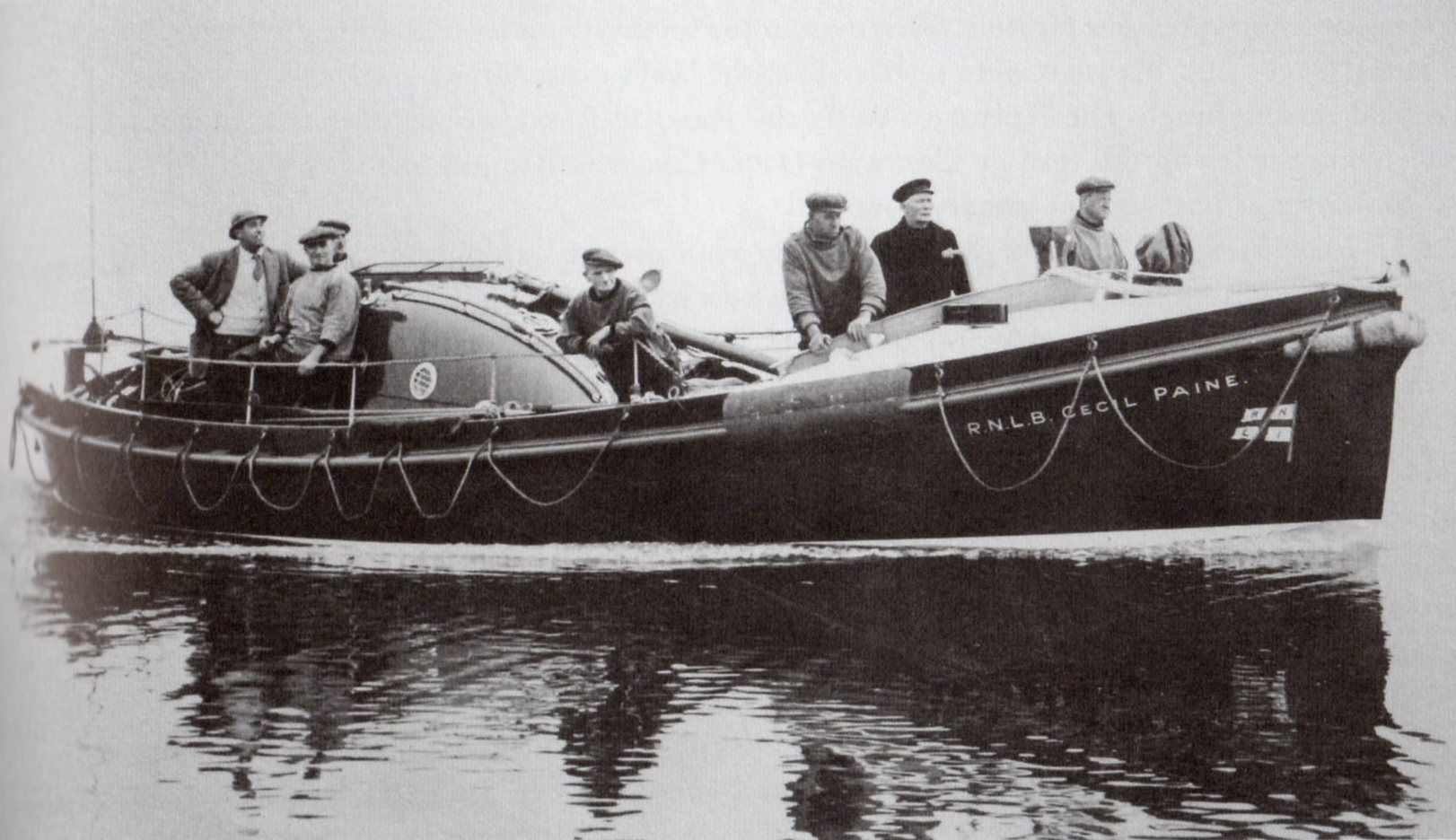
Liverpool-class motor lifeboat RNLB Cecil Paine (ON 850) on station between 1945 and 1965.

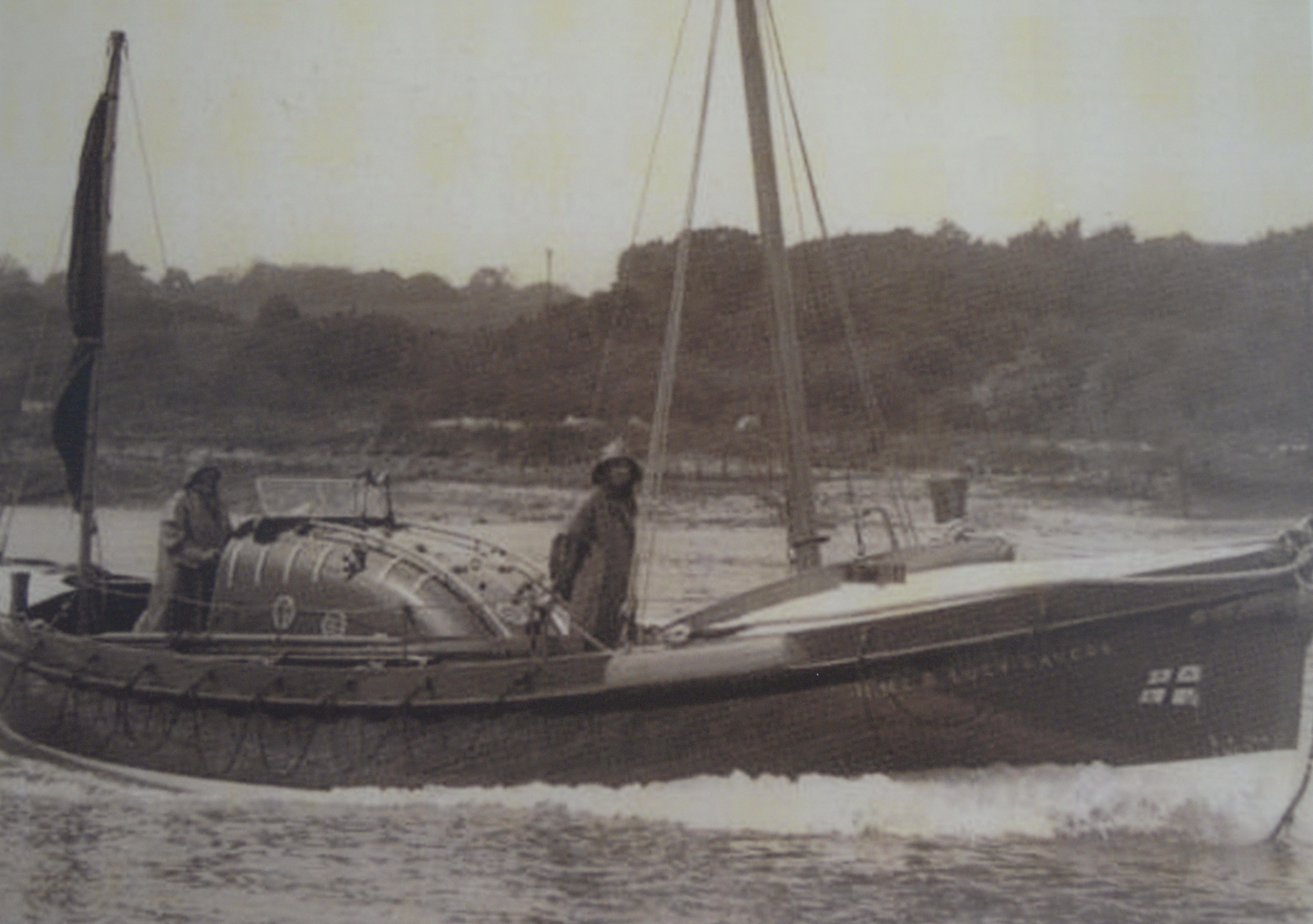
Liverpool-class motor lifeboat RNLB Lucy Lavers (ON 832) on station in 1962 and between 1963 and 1964.

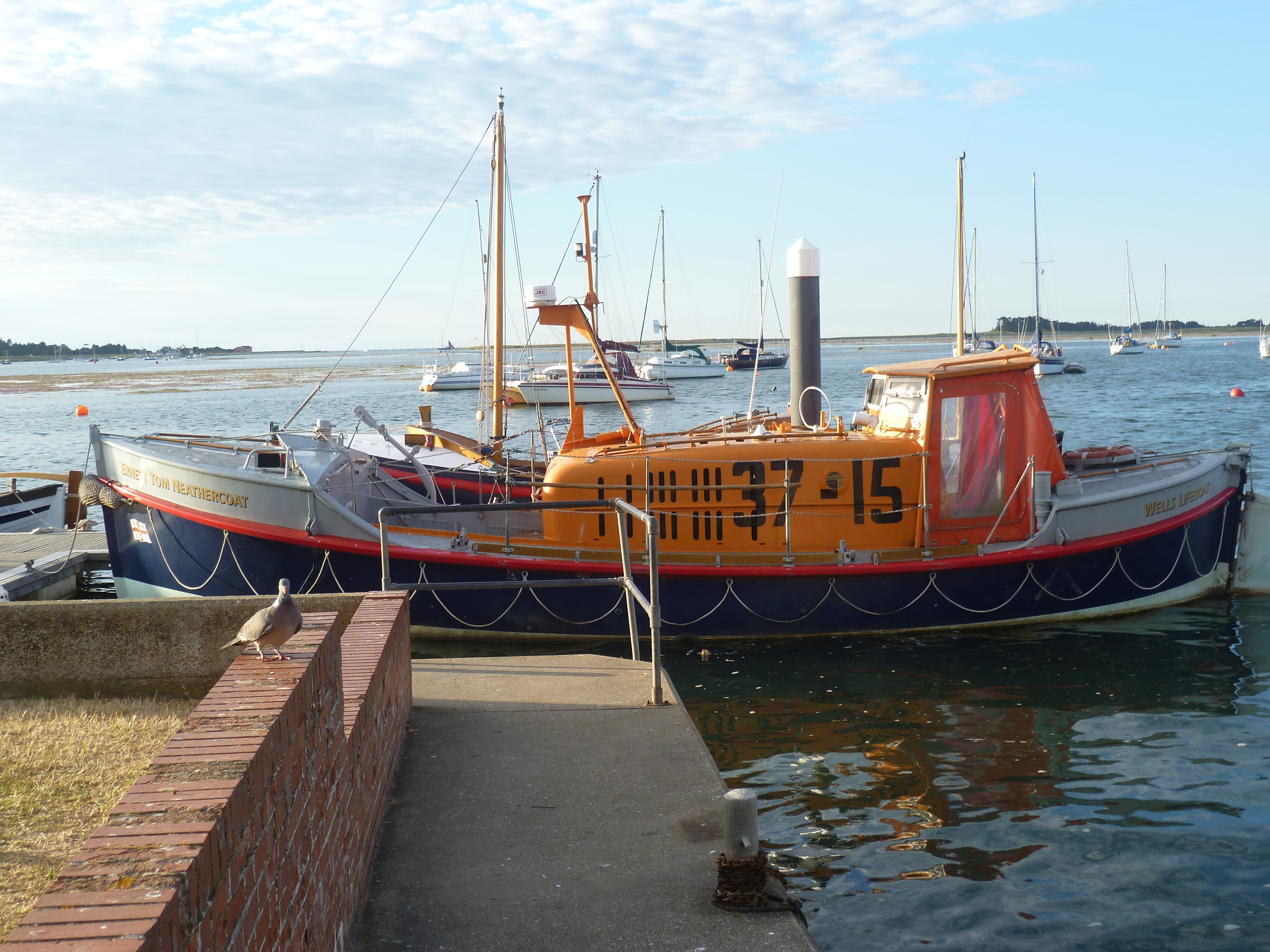
Restored Oakley-class motor lifeboat RNLB Ernest Tom Neathercoat (ON 982) pictured in 2018.

== See also ==
- List of RNLI stations
- List of former RNLI stations
- Royal National Lifeboat Institution lifeboats
