= Tommy Wright =

Tommy Wright may refer to:

- Tommy Wright (footballer, born 1928) (1928–2011), Scottish footballer, played for Sunderland
- Tommy Wright (footballer, born 1944) (1944–2026), English footballer who played for Everton
- Tommy Wright (footballer, born 1963), Northern Ireland footballer
- Tommy Wright (footballer, born 1966), Scottish footballer who played for Leicester City
- Tommy Wright (footballer, born 1984), English footballer and manager who has played for Aberdeen, Forest Green Rovers and Darlington
- Tommy Wright III (born 1976), American rapper and record producer
- Tommy Wright (actor) (1926–1999), appeared in The Elephant Man and Mary Shelley's Frankenstein

== See also ==
- Thomas Wright (disambiguation)
- Tom Wright (disambiguation)
