= Tom Wright =

Tom Wright may refer to:

== Arts and entertainment ==
- Tom Wright (American actor) (born 1952), American screen and theatre actor
- Tom Wright (architect) (born 1957), designer of the Burj Al Arab hotel in Dubai, United Arab Emirates
- Thomas M. Wright (born 1983), also known as Tom, Australian actor/director
- Tom Wright (Australian playwright) (born 1968), Australian theatre writer and director
- Tom Wright (1923–2002), Scottish poet, dramatist and television writer whose short story inspired the movie Hannibal Brooks
- Tom Wright, also known as Cube::Hard and Stargazer, English record producer and owner of the music label RFUGrey
- Tom Wright, former producer of The Bugle podcast

== Sports ==
- Tom Wright (Australian footballer) (1882–1916), Victorian Football League player
- Tom Wright (baseball) (1923–2017), Major League Baseball player between 1948–1956
- Tom Wright (cricketer) (born 1983), English cricketer
- Tom Wright (curler), American curler
- Tom Wright (greyhound trainer) (1861–1956), English greyhound trainer
- Tom Wright (1930s rugby league) (1900–1938), Australian rugby league player for the North Sydney Bears
- Tom Wright (sports executive) (born 1953), former commissioner of the Canadian Football League and former director of operations for UFC Canada
- Tom Wright (rugby, born 1997), Australian rugby league and rugby union player

== Other ==
- Tom Wright (politician) (born 1952), member of the Florida Senate
- N. T. Wright (born 1948), English Anglican bishop, biblical scholar, and theologian
- Tom Wright (bishop of East Carolina) (1904–1997), American Episcopal bishop
- Tom Wright (trade unionist) (1902–1981), Australian trade unionist

== See also ==
- Thomas Wright (disambiguation)
- Tommy Wright (disambiguation)
