= James Fleming (priest) =

Irish Church of England clergyman

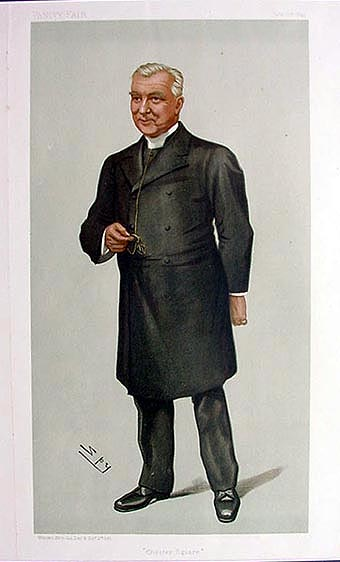
Canon James Fleming, 1899 caricature

James Fleming (1830–1908) was an Irish clergyman of the Church of England, public speaker and fund-raiser. A canon of York Minster, he became chaplain in ordinary to Queen Victoria and Edward VII, and was a close friend of the British royal family.

== Early life ==
Born at Carlow on 26 July 1830, he was from a Scots-Irish background, the youngest of five children of Patrick Fleming, M.D., of Strabane, who had married in 1820 Mary, daughter of Captain Francis Kirkpatrick. From 1833 to 1836 he was in Jamaica, his father having become paymaster to the 56th Regiment; and on his father's death in 1838 his mother, who survived to September 1876, moved to Bath, Somerset. His two brothers, William and Francis, were sent to Sandhurst, but ultimately took orders; William, a traditional Protestant, died vicar of Christ Church, Chislehurst, in May 1900.

Fleming went to King Edward VI's Grammar School, Bath, in 1840, and to Shrewsbury School in 1846, under Benjamin Hall Kennedy. He was in the school cricket team, and won the Millington scholarship, matriculating on 15 November 1849 at Magdalene College, Cambridge. He graduated B.A. there in 1853, proceeding M.A. in 1857 and B.D. in 1864.

== Priest and canon ==
Ordained deacon in 1853 and priest in 1854, he was curate, first, of St. Stephen, Ipswich (1853–5), and then of St. Stephen, Lansdown, in the parish of Walcot, Bath (1855–9), with charge of the chapel of All Saints. His plain evangelical preaching attracted congregations.

Fleming started classes of instruction in elocution for working people in 1859, and was an advocate of total abstinence. In 1866 he was appointed by trustees to the incumbency of Camden church, Camberwell, formerly held by Henry Melvill, and in 1873 was presented by the Hugh Grosvenor, 3rd Marquess of Westminster to the vicarage of St. Michael's Church, Chester Square. Admitted on 19 February 1874, he retained this living for the rest of his life, becoming chaplain to Grosvenor, by then Duke of Westminster, in 1875. During the period parochial schools and local churches increased and a convalescent home built at Birchington, for which a parishioner gave Fleming £23,500l. Outside his parish his main interests were Dr. Barnardo's Homes, the Religious Tract Society, of which he was an honorary secretary from 1880; and the Hospital Sunday Fund, to which his congregation made annual contributions.

On 30 May 1879 Lord Beaconsfield nominated Fleming to a residentiary canonry in York Minster. Archbishop William Thomson made him succentor there on 20 August 1881, and precentor with a prebendal stall on 3 January 1883.

== Later life ==
In 1880 Beaconsfield wanted to appoint Fleming first Bishop of Liverpool, but local pressure caused John Charles Ryle to be preferred. He later declined the Bishopric of Sydney, in November 1884, and for financial reasons Lord Salisbury's successive offers of the deaneries of Chester (20 December 1885) and of Norwich (6 May 1889).

Honorary chaplain to Queen Victoria (1876) and chaplain in ordinary to her (1880) and to Edward VII (1901), Fleming from 1879 preached almost yearly before the Queen and Prince of Wales, at Sandringham. From 1880 Fleming was Whitehead professor of preaching and elocution at the London College of Divinity (St. John's Hall, Highbury). With Thomas Pownall Boultbee of the College, and William Barlow, he advised Ann Dudin Brown, benefactor of Westfield College. Three times — 1901, 1903, and 1907— he was appointed William Jones lecturer (sometimes called the Golden lectureship) by the Haberdashers' Company.

Fleming, who early in 1877 denounced the "folly, obstinacy, and contumacy" of the ritualists in The Times (25 January 1877), ceased to wear the black gown in the pulpit after the judgment in Clifton v. Ridsdale (12 May 1877). His suspicion of ritualism only increased with his years. In later life he supported the Protestant agitation of John Kensit. His personal relations with C. H. Spurgeon, William Morley Punshon and other nonconformist leaders were good.

Fleming died at St. Michael's Vicarage on 1 September 1908, and was buried at Kensal Green cemetery. Ernest Harold Pearce in the Dictionary of National Biography wrote that "personal charm and grace of speech made him popular, but he was neither a student nor a thinker". A reredos and choir stalls in memory of him were placed in St. Michael's (1911), and a statue of King Edwyn in York Minster.

== Works ==
Fleming's Bath Penny Readings of 1862 covers one of the origins of the penny reading movement. He published a manual on The Art of Reading and Speaking (1896), Our Gracious Queen Alexandra (1901) for the Religious Tract Society, and sermons. Fleming explained in an open letter that he had transferred a sermon by Thomas De Witt Talmage from a common-place book to Science and the Bible (1880) inadvertently, in reply to an 1887 pamphlet accusing him of plagiarism from Talmage's Fifty Sermons.

On 24 January 1892 Fleming preached at Sandringham the sermon in memory of the Duke of Clarence. It was published as Recognition in Eternity, and had a steady sale, reaching in 1911 about 67,000 copies. The author's profits were distributed between charities named by Queen Alexandra: the Gordon Boys' Home and the British Home and Hospital for Incurables.

Fleming made a number of sound recordings for the Gramophone & Typewriter Ltd (later His Master's Voice, then part of EMI), of readings from literary works by Alexander Pope, Leigh Hunt and Thomas Hood, The Charge of the Light Brigade by Tennyson, etc. His rendering of Edgar Allan Poe's The Bells, where the first three verses occupied one 10-inch single-sided disc, and verse 4 took the whole of a second disc, exhibits throughout his fine control of spoken and extended pitch. The phonetician Daniel Jones employed the first of the 'Bells' discs as one of his illustrations of 'intonation curves'. He also recorded part of the Gramophone album of discs in 1908 giving a service for the Church of England Morning Prayer, but died before completing the set (which was taken over by the Reverend Joshua Parkyn).

== Family ==
Fleming married, on 21 June 1853, at Holy Trinity, Brompton, Grace Purcell, elder daughter of Admiral Purcell; she died on 25 May 1903. They had three sons and three daughters.

== Notes ==
Attribution

This article incorporates text from a publication now in the public domain: Lee, Sidney, ed. (1912). "Fleming, James". Dictionary of National Biography (2nd supplement). Vol. 2. London: Smith, Elder & Co.
