= RNLB Lucy Lavers =

1940 lifeboat

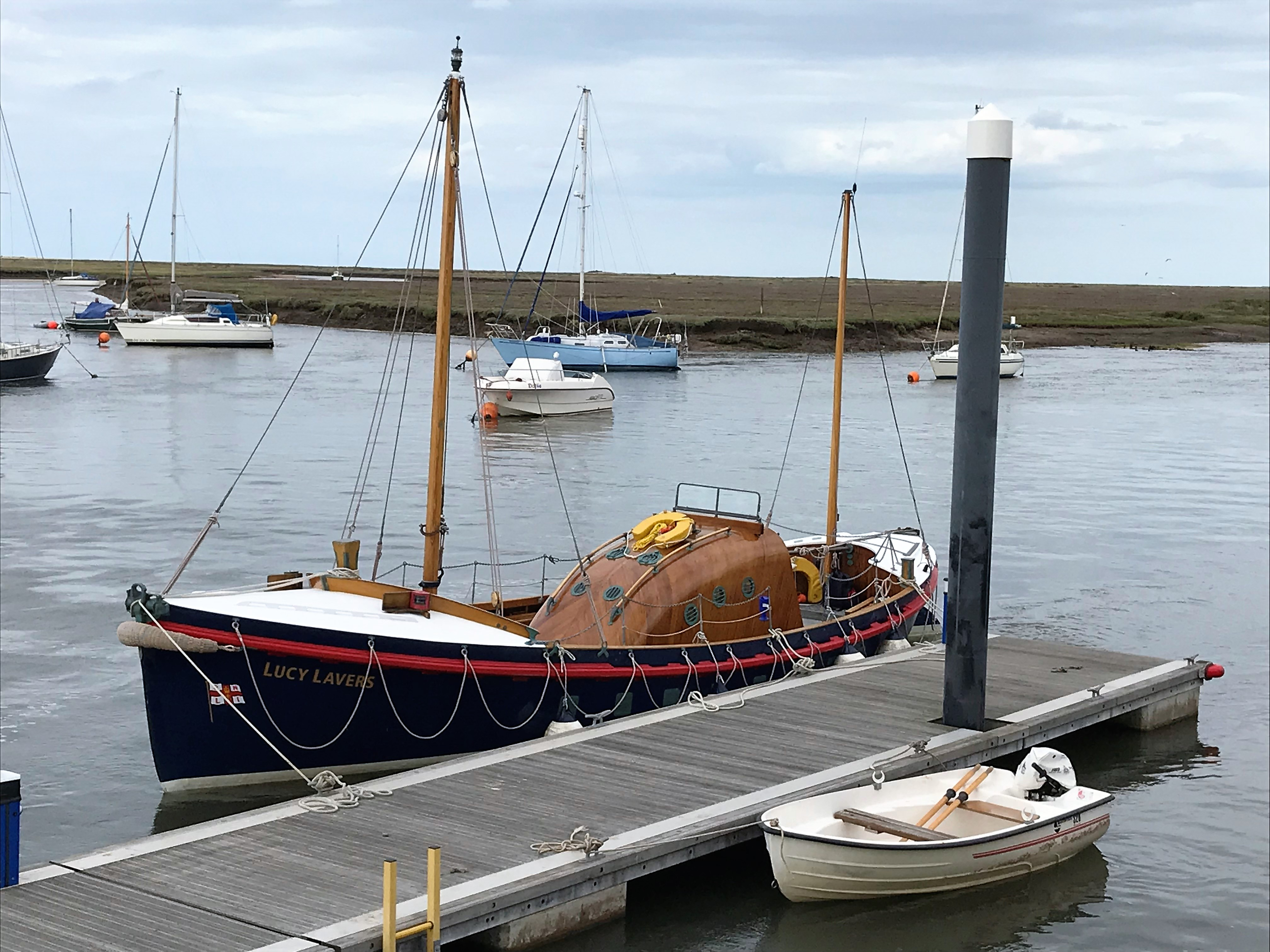
- RNLB Lucy Lavers (ON 832)

History

United Kingdom
- Owner: Royal National Lifeboat Institution (RNLI)
- Builder: Groves & Gutteridge, Cowes, Isle of Wight
- Official Number: ON 832
- Station: Aldeburgh, Wells-next-the-Sea
- Laid down: 1939
- Completed: 1940
- In service: 1940 to 1968; (Re-named L'Esperance), became a pilot boat in the Channel Island port of St. Helier, Jersey.
- Refit: Restored 2013-2015
- Status: In service

General characteristics
- Class & type: Liverpool Class
- Type: Motor lifeboat
- Displacement: 6 tons 10cwt
- Length: 35 ft 6 in (10.82 m) overall
- Beam: 10 ft 3 in (3.12 m)
- Draught: 2 ft 3.5 in (0.699 m)
- Depth: 4 ft 4 in (1.32 m)
- Installed power: 35hp Weyburn petrol engine
- Speed: 7.42 kn (13.74 km/h)
- Notes: Fitted with single mast and carried two oars

RNLB Lucy Lavers (ON 832) was an RNLI lifeboat which was on No. 2 station at Aldeburgh from 1940 until 1959 when she was placed in the reserve fleet until 1968 when she was retired. The Rescue Wooden Boats Charity is currently undertaking restoration of the vessel. The Lucy Lavers is entered in the National Historic Ships register and has the Certificate No 2206.

== Description ==
Lucy Lavers is a Liverpool-class single engine lifeboat which was also equipped with a sail, as was favoured by the RNLI for all single engine Liverpool class lifeboat. To stabiliser the lifeboat when under sail she was also fitted with a drop keel. The installed engine was a 35 hp Weyburn petrol engine. She was built for the RNLI by Groves and Gutteridge and was laid down in 1939. The boat was finished in 1940 and was sent for service at the Aldeburgh Lifeboat Station. The lifeboat was 35 ft 6in long and has a beam of 10 ft 3in and a draft of only 2 ft 3.5in. She had a displacement of 6 tons.

== Service at No. 2 Station in Aldeburgh ==
=== The Dunkirk evacuation ===
The Lucy Lavers arrived in Aldeburgh in 1940 and was almost immediately commandeered, along with Aldeburghs No:1 station lifeboat RNLB Abdy Beauclerk (ON 751) by the Royal Navy. She was summoned to Dover and arrived at the port on 31 May. She was needed, along with 17 other RNLI lifeboats, to help in the Dunkirk evacuation, the removal of the British Expeditionary Force and the French Army from Dunkirk. At Dover small Royal Navy crews with a small number of RNLI coxswain towed the lifeboats to the French coast. They arrived just east of Dunkirk harbour where they began the evacuation. Lucy Lavers along with the other lifeboats was ordered to remain at Dunkirk until ordered to return home. She remained there and ferrying the evacuees out to larger ships. She stayed in the vicinity until late on the evening of 4 June. The Lucy Lavers, along with the other surviving lifeboats, returned overnight to Ramsgate in Kent.

=== Wartime rescues ===
The Aldeburgh station records show that during the rest of the Second World War, Lucy Lavers along with Abdy Beauclerk were called out on many occasions. Most of these 'shouts' (calls for help) were in response to reports of aircraft crashed into the sea. Both Lifeboats spent long hours searching exhaustively for survivors but on most occasions all they found was wreckage or patches of oil. The lifeboats at Aldeburgh were responsible for saving a total of 107 lives during the war period.

== Retirement and Restoration ==
Lucy Lavers served at Aldeburgh for 19 years, during which she and her crew undertook 30 operations which saved 7 lives. During her service in the RNLI's reserve fleet at Wells-next-the-Sea, Sheringham, and Rhyl, she undertook a further 52 missions, saving 37 lives. In 1968 she was finally sold out of the fleet by the RNLI and began a career as a pilot boat in the port of Saint Helier, Jersey. She was also renamed L'Esperance and eventually became a private fishing boat. In 1986 the lifeboat was given a new role when she was bought by a Dive and Ski Club of St. Helier as Lucy. During this period she spend most of her time around the island of Sark. In 1997 she was finally retired and her engine canopy and some of her remaining fixtures and fittings were stripped out and used in the restoration of Howard D (ON 797), an ex-Saint Helier lifeboat. Following the removal of these parts, her diagonal mahogany hull, which was still in good condition, was sent to Simon Evans Boat Yard on the River Yonne, in Sens, France. She then joined the Dunkirk Little Ships Restoration Trust.

=== Restoration ===
Following some keen detective work by two lifeboat enthusiasts from Norfolk, who had been looking for Lucy Lavers for some time, she was found in 2006. Lucy Lavers underwent full restoration at Stiffkey, Norfolk from 2013. Having been stripped back to little more than a bare hull, the majority of her original mahogany hull remains. She is listed on the National Register of Historic Vessels by National Historic Ships. Her certificate number is 2206. In 2012 the National Lottery Heritage Fund awarded a grant to Rescue Wooden Boats £99.300 towards the restoration of the Lucy Lavers. The restoration was completed in time for the lifeboat to return to Dunkirk under her own steam to join the 75th anniversary celebrations of Dunkirk evacuation in May 2015. She is moored at Wells-next-the-Sea in Norfolk (see last photograph below) and is currently used for boat trips out of the harbour.

== Gallery ==
RNLB Lucy Lavers (ON 832)

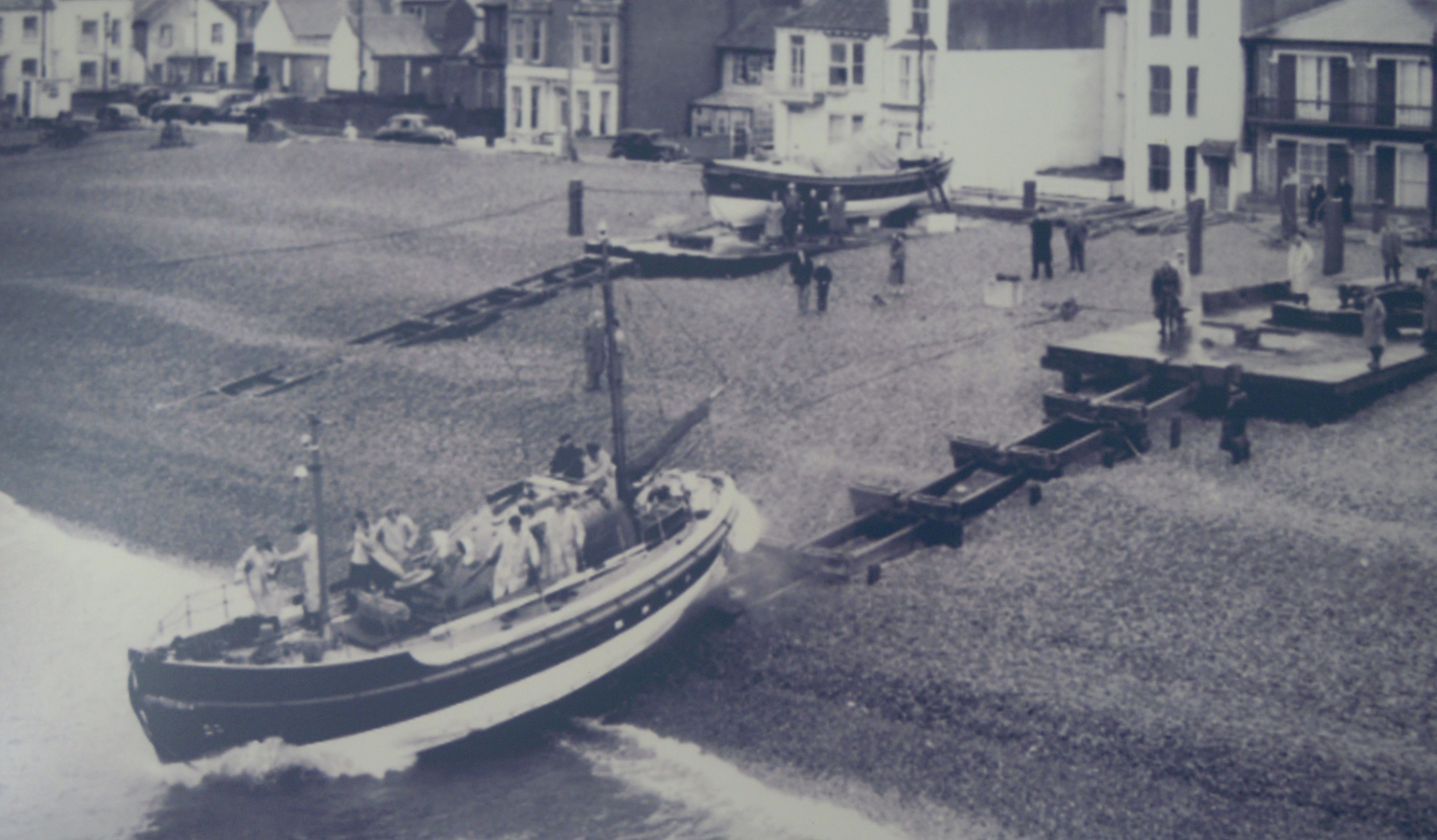
Lucy Lavers on beach at Aldeburgh No:2 station. Alfred and Patience Gottwald being launched

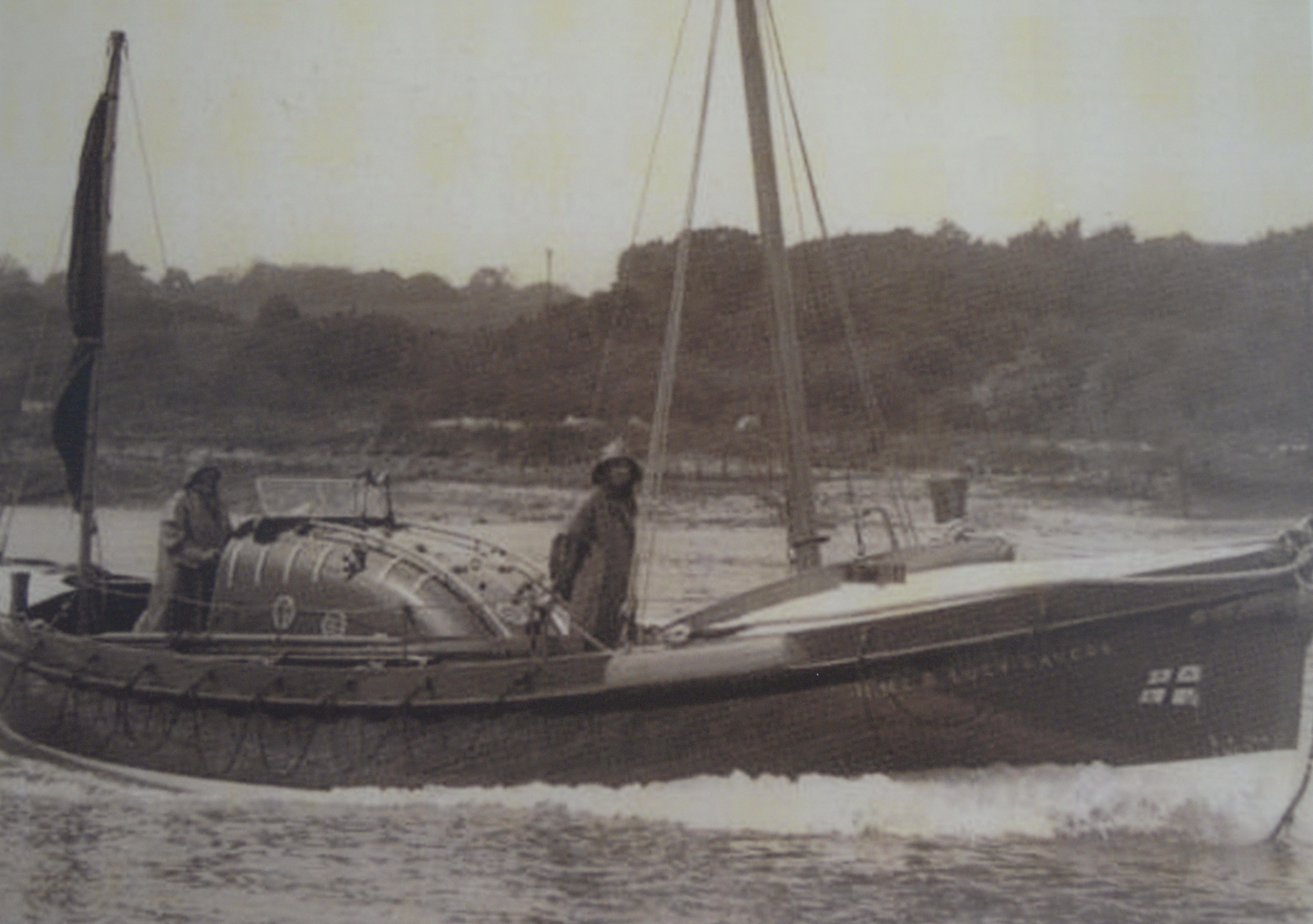
Lucy Lavers at Sea

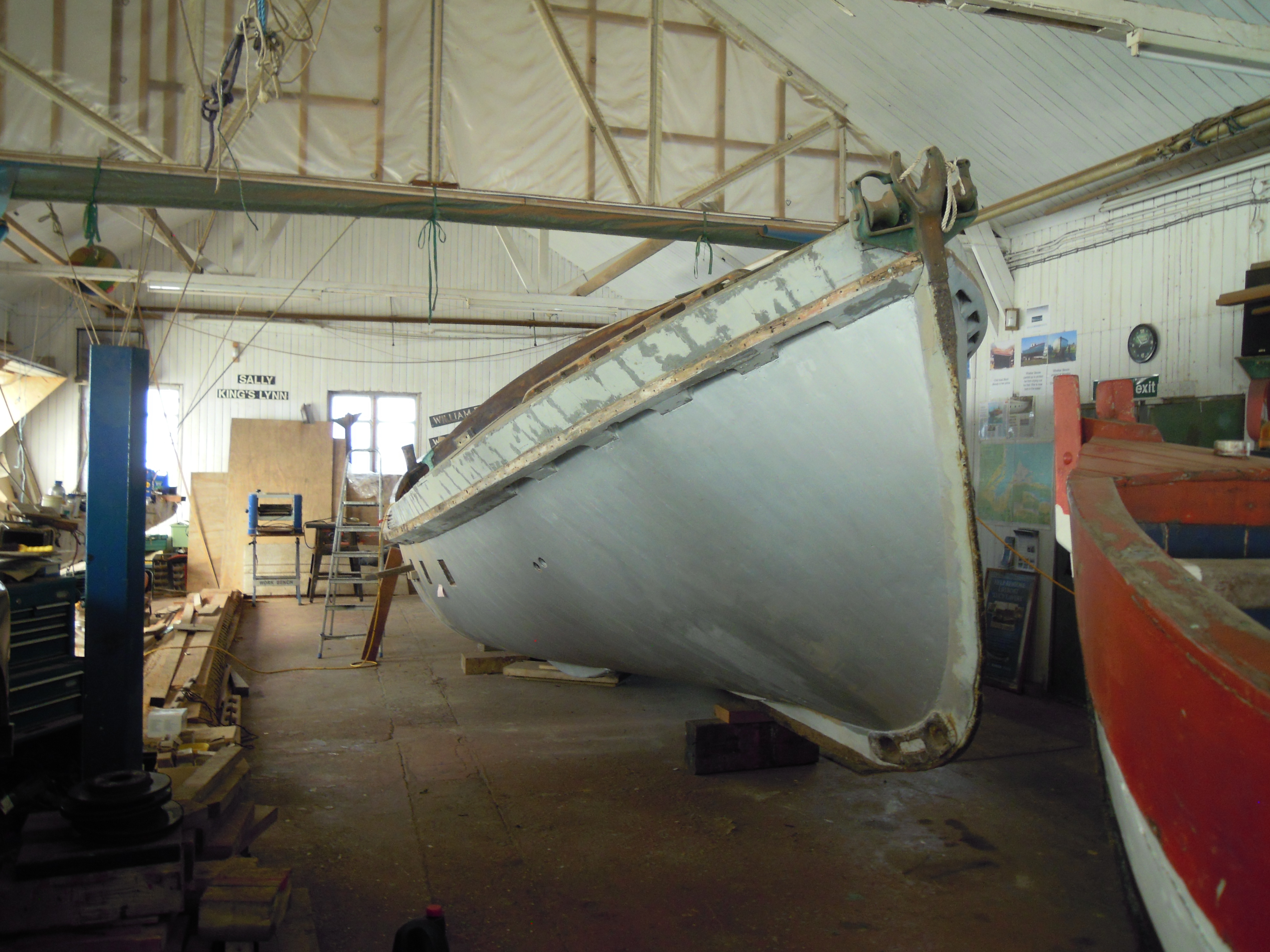
Undergoing restoration at Stiffkey, Norfolk (August 2013)

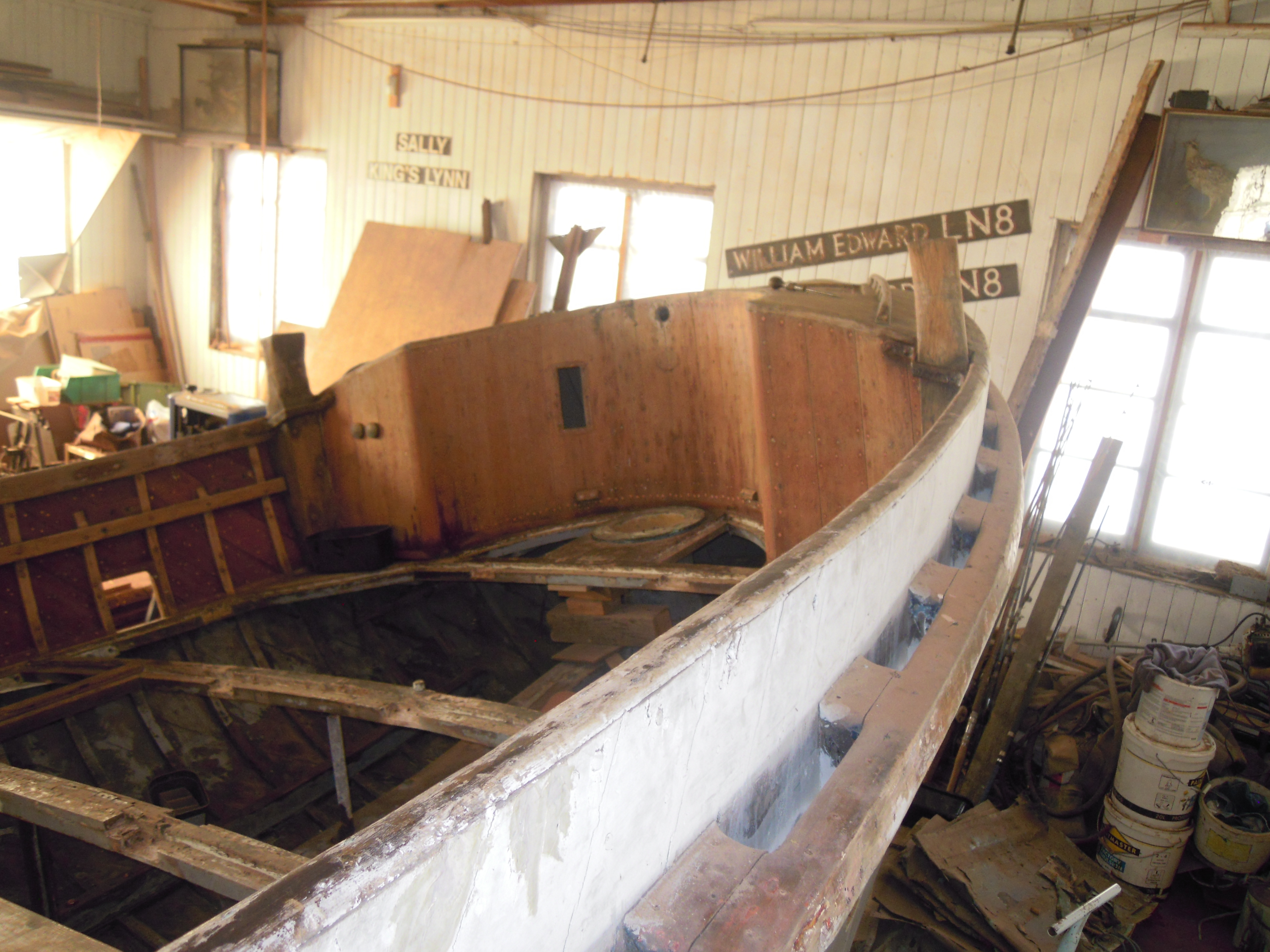

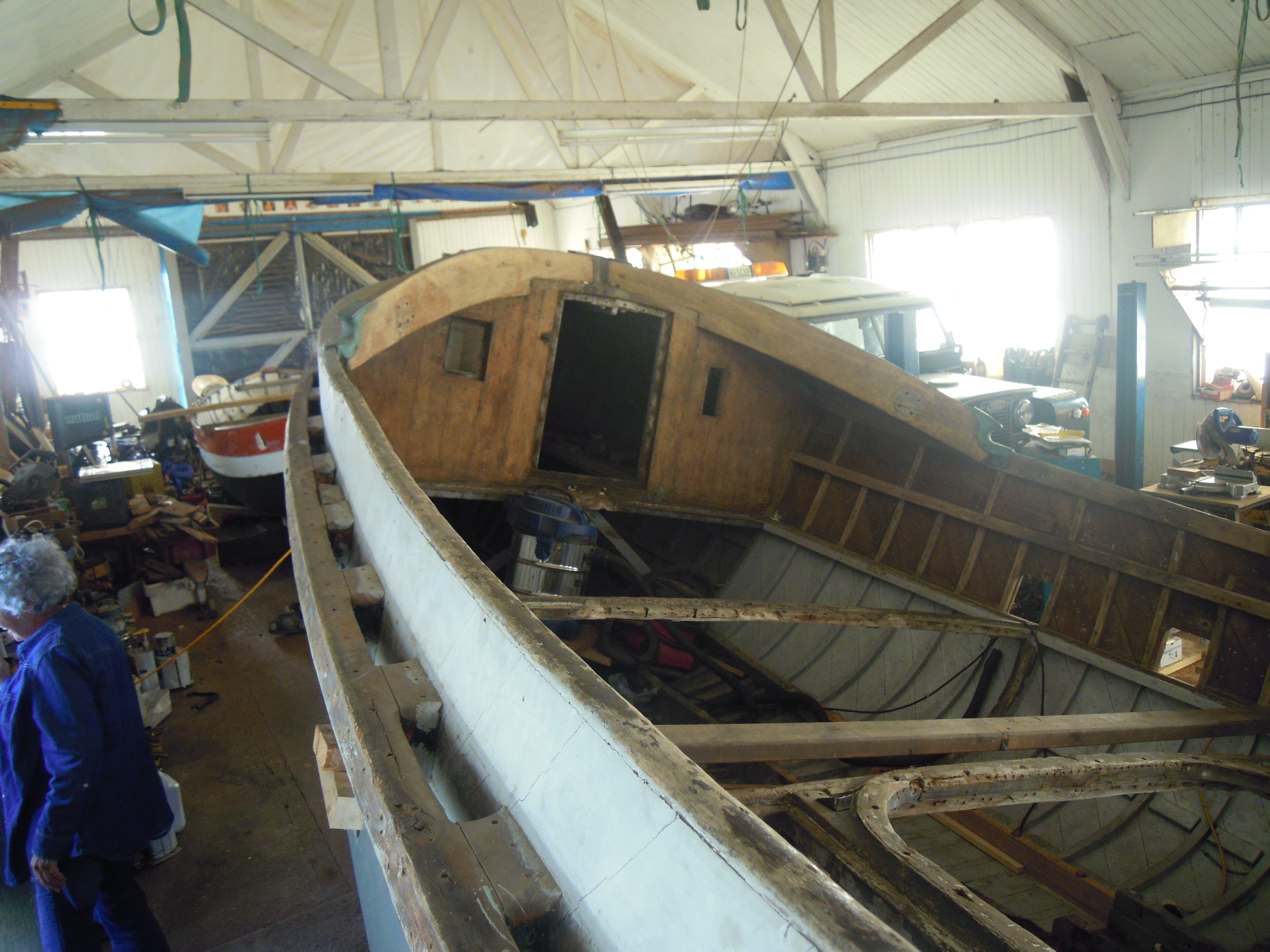

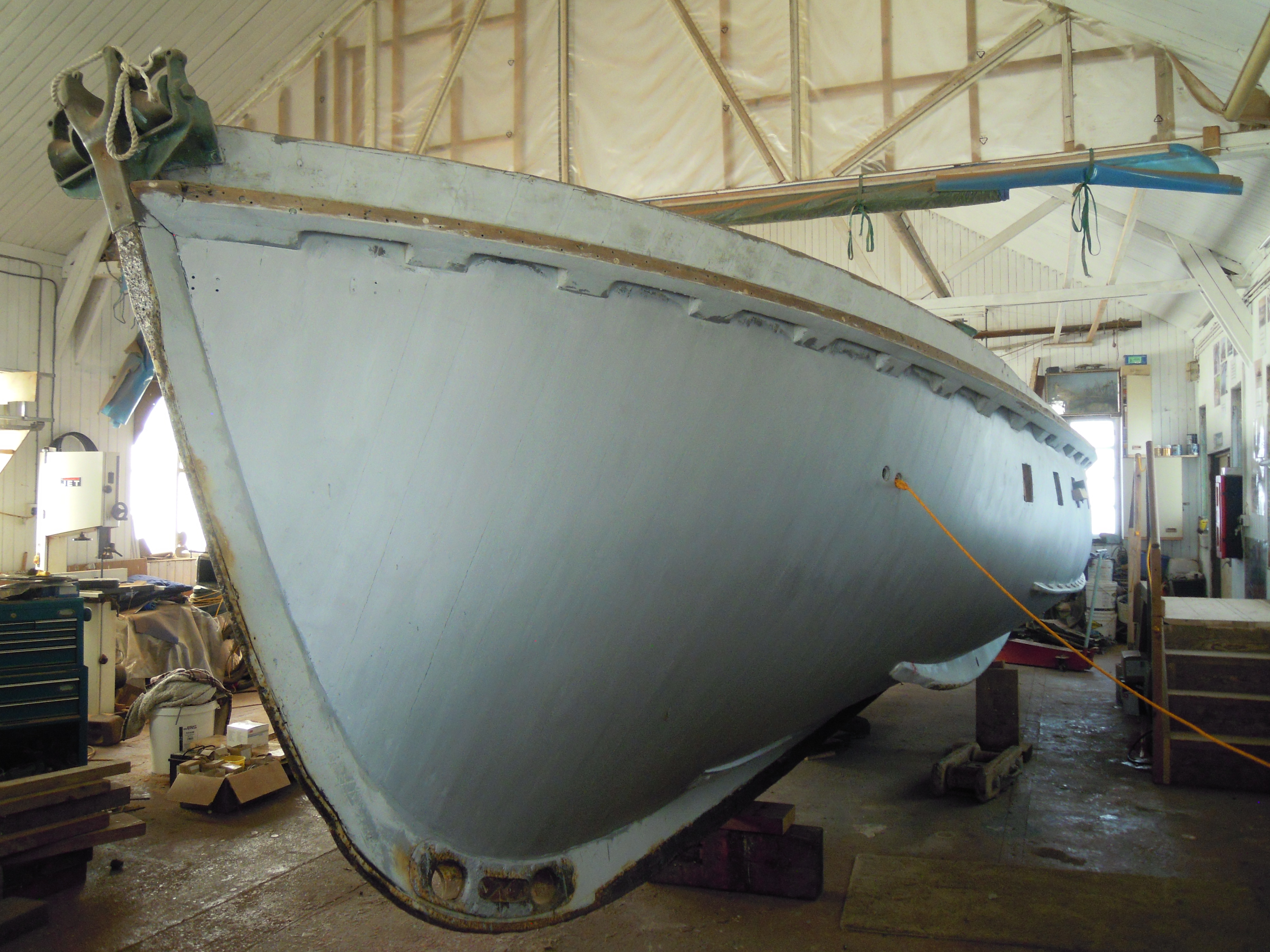

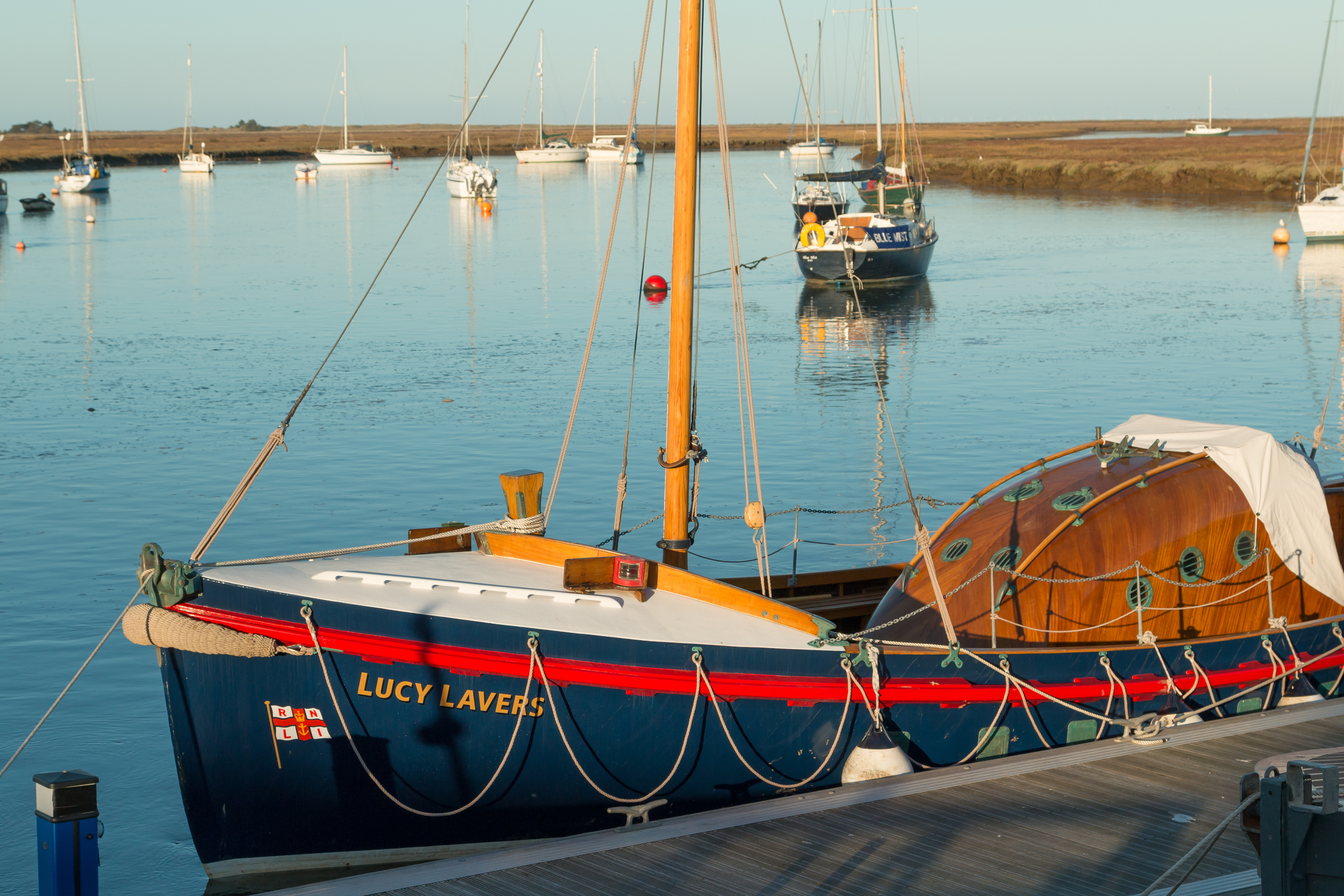
Fully Restored operating from Wells-Next-The-Sea (Norfolk Coast)
