= Thomas A. Wright Sr. =

American civil rights leader

Thomas Alexander Wright Sr.
- Born: March 26, 1920; Moultrie, Georgia
- Died: December 9, 2014 (aged 94); Gainesville, Florida
- Church: Mount Carmel Baptist Church

Reverend Thomas Alexander Wright Sr. (March 26, 1920 – December 9, 2014) was a civil rights leader and former president of the Gainesville, Florida chapter of the NAACP in the early 1960s. Wright was a prominent religious leader who preached throughout various parts of Florida, as well as a World War II veteran. He is credited for being one of the first to introduce the Civil Rights Movement to Gainesville, Florida in the 1960s.

== Early life ==
=== Family and personal life ===
Reverend Thomas A. Wright Sr. was born on March 26, 1920, in Moultrie, Georgia to his farmer and primitive Baptist preacher father, Albert Wright, and stay-at-home mother, Roxy Sky White. He was the middle child of seven brothers and one sister. In 1923, Wright and his family moved to Boynton Beach, Florida. There, Wright’s father became invested in religion, although neither of his parents attended church regularly. When Wright was twelve, his father died. In his youth, Wright would frequently find himself working as a farmhand or doing other types of manual labor. At thirteen, Wright dropped out of school to start working his first job. However, soon after his mother encouraged him to go back to school and begin attending church.

=== Elementary education ===
Young Thomas A. Wright Sr., with the support of a local elementary school principal, Ozzie Youngblood, who he cites as being “the most influential on [his] life," furthered his education by studying at night, using his cousin as a tutor, and working around his work schedule to participate in special programs offered by the school. However, these efforts were met with opposition from school trustees who prevented Wright from marching at eighth-grade graduation. During his lifetime, Wright frequently mentioned a moment from his childhood that instilled in him values that he carried on later in his religious practice and civil rights work. This would be his involvement in an oratorical contest in West Palm Beach, that he was specifically chosen to participate in by Ozzie Youngblood despite his invalid status as a student of the school. Wright talked about the event and his second place win as “a true feeling of accomplishment” in which he “knew [he] had rendered a job well done." In his autobiography, Courage in Persona, he describes the limitations imposed on African Americans and their education in Florida in his early years of life which prevented them from excelling past elementary school. Nevertheless, Wright claimed to also be heavily motivated by deacons of his church and those who demonstrated dedication to the church.

=== Affie Mae Clayton ===
Thomas A. Wright Sr. met the person who would later become his wife, Affie Mae Clayton, at the age of 14. Clayton and Wright attended church and Sunday School together. In 1940, when Wright was 20 years old and Clayton was 18, the two decided to travel to Fort Lauderdale, Florida together to try and wed. However, after being turned away due to being underage, they continued to Miami where they would then lie about their age, claiming they were both 21, and follow through with the marriage. Thomas A. Wright Sr. and Affie Mae Clayton had four children together, Philoron A. Wright, Patricia A. Murray, Thomas A. Wright Jr., and Lavon Wright Bracy.

== Military career ==
Philadelphia

In 1942, declining job opportunities in Boynton Beach as a result of WWII prompted the two, along with Wright’s brother and his wife, to move to Philadelphia, Pennsylvania, leaving behind their first child, Patricia. Here, Wright would earn a job working at the Philadelphia Navy Yard “as a pipe fitter-helper." While here, Wright attended the Bright Hope Baptist Church. It was during this time in Pennsylvania that Wright would be inducted into the army.

Deployment

Starting in 1944, Thomas A. Wright Sr. served in England, New Guinea, the Philippines, and Japan. Wright’s second child, Thomas, would be born while he was deployed and serving in World War II. After finishing his deployment in Japan, Wright made his way back to America, settling once again in Boynton Beach. Wright was greeted by his former principal, Ozzie Youngblood, who encouraged him to attend college with the help of the newly rewarded G.I. Bill benefits.

== Religious Education and Ministry ==
Florida Memorial College

In 1946, Thomas A. Wright Sr. enrolled in Florida Memorial College in St. Augustine, Florida as a veteran. His first semester would be spent completing the requirements to attain a high school diploma. Thomas A. Wright’s wife would also go on to attend Florida Memorial College. The third child of Thomas A. Wright Sr., Philoron, as well as his fourth and final child, LaVon, was born during his time at Florida Memorial College. Wright was ordained as a preacher in 1948 in his second year of college. He would complete his studies at Florida Memorial College in 1950 as an honor student and, in 1951, Wright would enroll in the Howard University School of Religion in Washington D.C.

Howard University

Wright was able to finance his time in seminary through a scholarship, as well as through working two part-time jobs. He would finish his studies there in 1954. During his time at the Howard University School of Divinity, Thomas A. Wright Sr. did field work relating to his religious studies in Baltimore, Maryland. His field work consisted of him preaching once a month on Sundays at Enon Baptist Church over the course of two years with the title of assistant pastor. Washington D.C. marked the first place where Thomas A. Wright Sr. would begin his anti-racism work. In his autobiography, Wright mentions how him and his peers, often in integrated groups, would frequently “test restaurants” by going into them and determining whether or not they would be kicked out or have the police called on them. He graduated from the Howard University Divinity School in 1954 with high honors.

St. Augustine

When his work and studies at Howard University were complete, Wright returned to Florida to take over Saint Mary’s Baptist Church in St. Augustine despite offers to take over as head pastor in Baltimore. St. Augustine became the first place Thomas A. Wright Sr. and his wife would solidify their work as activists in the Civil Rights Movement. Though there was no established NAACP at this time, Wright would be involved in the less formal, “Saint Augustine Improvement Association which cooperated with civil rights activities,” as well as the African American Recreation Committee. While Wright organized many sit-ins and other types of protests during this time, St. Augustine would prove to be a dangerous site for civil rights efforts. This danger prompted the Wright family to move to Gainesville, Florida where the Civil Rights Movement had yet to make headway.

== Activism and organizational leadership ==
Gainesville

In August 1962, Wright was asked to preach at Mount Carmel Baptist Church in Gainesville, Florida. While in Gainesville, Wright began to recognize social problems that he intended to bring awareness to and to address; a need for public housing and day care centers, support for black-owned businesses, and overall civil rights became important issues for Wright. In 1963, Wright ran unsuccessfully for City Commissioner “with the support of members of the University of Florida’s faculty and staff". He became involved with the integrated Gainesville Women for Equal Rights organization that was a counterpart to the NAACP, as well as the Eastside Student Assistant Association. Wright’s involvement with the Gainesville Women for Equal Rights organization would lead to his introduction into the NAACP, due to the fact that the organizations would hold joint meetings and many participants of the former would be compelled to join the latter. Wright believed there were substantial differences between civil rights activism in St. Augustine and that of Gainesville, most notably the increased involvement of European Americans in the movement in Gainesville as opposed to St. Augustine. Wright retire after 44 years of service at Mount Carmel Baptist Church in 2006.

== NAACP Presidency ==
At an NAACP meeting at Mount Pleasant United Methodist Church in Gainesville, Wright was asked to take over the position of president of the local NAACP chapter. Despite being reluctant and insisting the position last just six months, Wright would remain president of the chapter for seventeen years. Wright would see his daughter become one of the first black students in the nation to attend an integrated school.

== Legacy ==
Wright was successful in recruiting members of the NAACP by speaking to various congregations and convincing them to join. While conducting his work in civil rights, Wright continued to preach at Mount Carmel Baptist Church and remained in its original edifice, built in the 1940s, for about twenty-four years. After expanding Mount Carmel, Wright was able to organize a number of social welfare projects, including affordable housing through the Gardenia Garden Apartments, a $1.3 million project. In 1987, he received a special appreciation gift for twenty-five years of service by the Mount Carmel Baptist Church. Thomas A. Wright Sr. is cited having said he believed economic competency in black leadership was a necessary trait to continue pursuing civil rights. in 2018 the City of Gainesville renamed Eight Avenue to Rev. Dr. Thomas A. Wright Boulevard.

== Death ==
Thomas A. Wright’s wife, Affie Mae Wright, died in April 1988 from diabetes. Before he died on December 9, 2014, Wright composed an autobiography titled Courage in Persona: The Autobiography of Thomas A. Wright Sr., which was published in 1993.
