= Thomas Wright (social commentator) =

English social commentator (1839–1909)

Thomas Wright (12 April 1839 – 19 February 1909) was an English social commentator.

He was the son of a blacksmith who became a tramping worker, before finding employment as a mutual labourer in an engineering firm. He studied on his own, and in 1872 became one of the first national school-board visitors. He wrote widely on the world of the working man into which he had been born.

Wright's essays on social commentary were published in three volumes: Some Habits and Customs of the Working Classes (1867), The Great Unwashed (1868), and Our New Masters (1873).
