= John B. Alley =

American businessman and politician

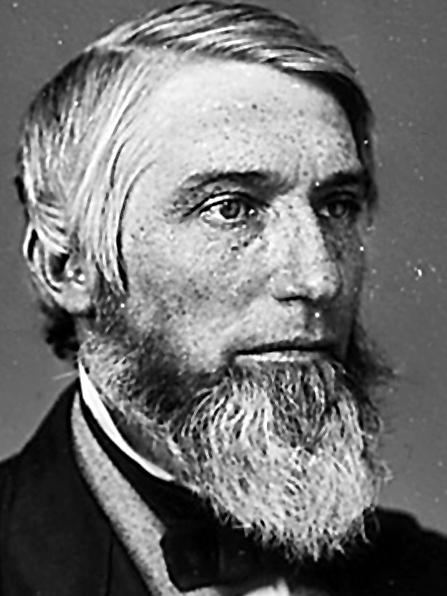
- Alley c. 1860–65

Member of the U.S. House of Representatives from Massachusetts
- In office March 4, 1859 – March 4, 1867
- Preceded by: Timothy Davis
- Succeeded by: Benjamin Butler
- Constituency: 6th district (1859–1863); 5th district (1863–1867)

Member of the Massachusetts State Senate from the Essex District
- In office 1852–1852

Member of the Massachusetts Executive Council
- In office 1847–1851

Member of the Lynn Board of Aldermen
- In office 1850–1850
- Preceded by: Office established

Personal details
- Born: John Bassett Alley; January 7, 1817 Lynn, Massachusetts, US
- Died: January 19, 1896 (aged 79) West Newton, Massachusetts, US
- Resting place: Pine Grove Cemetery
- Party: Liberty; Free Soil; Republican
- Spouse: Hannah Maria Rhodes
- Children: John and Emma
- Profession: Shoe Manufacture

John Bassett Alley (January 7, 1817 – January 19, 1896) was a 19th-century American businessman and politician who served four terms as a U.S. representative from Massachusetts from 1859 to 1867.

== Early life ==
John Alley was born on January 7, 1817, in Lynn, Massachusetts. He attended the common schools and Phillips Academy Andover. At the age of fourteen, he was apprenticed to work for a shoemaker and was released at nineteen.

In 1832, his parents, John Sr. and Mercy (née Buffum), and his younger sister Sarah joined the Church of Christ in 1832, later renamed the Church of Jesus Christ of Latter Day Saints. They moved to Nauvoo, Illinois, where Sarah was one of the first women to marry polygamously and became the first Mormon woman to bear a child as a polygamist.

=== Early career ===
In 1836, Alley moved to Cincinnati, Ohio and took a job freighting merchandise up and down the Mississippi River. In 1838, he returned to Lynn and entered the shoe manufacturing business. He established a hide and leather house in Boston in 1847.

== Political career ==
Alley served as a member of the Massachusetts Governor's Council from 1847 to 1851. In 1850, he served as member of the first Board of Aldermen of Lynn.

He represented Lynn in the State Senate in 1852 and as a member of the Massachusetts Constitutional Convention of 1853.

=== United States Congress ===
In 1852, Alley was a Free Soil candidate for U.S. Representative, but lost. He joined the new Republican Party and was elected to the Thirty-sixth and to the three succeeding Congresses (March 4, 1859 – March 3, 1867). He served as chairman of the Committee on the Post Office and Post Roads (Thirty-eighth and Thirty-ninth Congresses). He was not a candidate for renomination in 1866. He became connected with the Union Pacific Railroad.

== Later life and death ==
During the 1880s and 1890s, Alley was involved in a protracted lawsuit known as the Snow-Alley case which damaged his health and cost him a large part of his fortune.

He abandoned active business pursuits in 1886 and died in West Newton, Massachusetts on January 19, 1896. He was interred in Pine Grove Cemetery, Lynn, Massachusetts.

== Bibliography ==
- United States Congress. "John B. Alley (id: A000155)". Biographical Directory of the United States Congress.
- Barstow, Benjamin: Speech of Benjamin Barstow, of Salem, page 6, (1853).
- History of Essex County, Massachusetts: With Biographical Sketches of Many of Its Pioneers and Prominent Men pages 360–361, (1888).
- Hobbs, Clarence W.: Lynn and Surroundings, page 139, (1886).
- Johnson, David Newhall: Sketches of Lynn, Or, The Changes of Fifty Years, pages 468–471, (1880).
- Johnson, Rossiter, ed. (1906). "Alley, John Buffum". The Biographical Dictionary of America. Vol. 1. Boston: American Biographical Society. p. 93.

U.S. House of Representatives
Preceded by Timothy Davis	Member of the U.S. House of Representatives from Massachusetts's 6th congressional district March 4, 1859 – March 3, 1863	Succeeded by Daniel W. Gooch
Preceded by Samuel Hooper	Member of the U.S. House of Representatives from Massachusetts's 5th congressional district March 4, 1863 – March 3, 1867	Succeeded by Benjamin Franklin Butler
