= Daniel W. Gooch =

American politician

Daniel Wheelwright Gooch
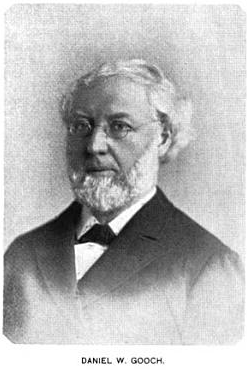

Member of the U.S. House of Representatives from Massachusetts
- In office January 31, 1858 – September 1, 1865
- Preceded by: Nathaniel P. Banks
- Succeeded by: Nathaniel P. Banks
- Constituency: 7th district (1858–63); 6th district (1863–65)
- In office March 4, 1873 – March 3, 1875
- Preceded by: Benjamin Butler
- Succeeded by: Nathaniel P. Banks
- Constituency: 5th district

Member of the Massachusetts Constitutional Convention of 1853
- In office 1853–1853

Member of the Massachusetts House of Representatives
- In office 1852

Personal details
- Born: January 8, 1820 Wells, Massachusetts (now Maine)
- Died: November 1, 1891 (aged 71) Melrose, Massachusetts
- Party: Republican
- Spouse: Hannah H. Pope
- Children: William W. Gooch, born September 8, 1857
- Education: Phillips Academy (Andover), Dartmouth College

Daniel Wheelwright Gooch (January 8, 1820 – November 1, 1891) was a United States representative from Massachusetts.

== Early life and education ==
Daniel W. Gooch was born on January 8, 1820, in Wells, York County (then part of Massachusetts, now Maine). He attended public schools and Phillips Academy, Andover, graduating from Dartmouth College in 1843. He studied law and was admitted to the bar in Boston in 1846.

== Career ==
Gooch served as a member of the Massachusetts House of Representatives, was a member of the State constitutional convention in 1853, and was elected as a Republican to the Thirty-fifth Congress to fill the vacancy caused by the resignation of Nathaniel P. Banks. He was reelected to the four succeeding Congresses and served from January 31, 1858, to September 1, 1865, when he resigned. He was appointed Navy agent of the port of Boston in 1865, but removed by President Andrew Johnson. He was again elected to the Forty-third Congress (March 4, 1873 – March 3, 1875), but was an unsuccessful candidate for reelection in 1874 to the Forty-fourth Congress.

He then became a pension agent in Boston 1876-1886, resumed the practice of law and also engaged in literary pursuits. Gooch died in Melrose on November 11, 1891, and was interred in Wyoming Cemetery.

U.S. House of Representatives
| Preceded by Nathaniel P. Banks | Member of the U.S. House of Representatives from Massachusetts's 7th congressional district January 31, 1858 – March 3, 1863 | Succeeded by George S. Boutwell |
| Preceded by John B. Alley | Member of the U.S. House of Representatives from Massachusetts's 6th congressional district March 4, 1863 – September 1, 1865 | Succeeded by Nathaniel P. Banks |
| Preceded by Benjamin F. Butler | Member of the U.S. House of Representatives from Massachusetts's 5th congressional district March 4, 1873 – March 3, 1875 | Succeeded by Nathaniel P. Banks |
