= Senator Griswold =

Senator Griswold may refer to:

== Members of the United States Senate ==
- Dwight Griswold (1893–1954), U.S. Senator from Nebraska from 1952 to 1954
- Stanley Griswold (1763–1815), U.S. Senator from Ohio in 1809

== United States state senate members ==
- George Griswold (1794–1857), Michigan State Senate
- Harry W. Griswold (1886–1939), Wisconsin State Senate
- Whiting Griswold (1814–1874), Massachusetts State Senate
- William M. Griswold (1823–1889), Wisconsin State Senate
