= Nathaniel P. Banks =

American politician and general (1816–1894)

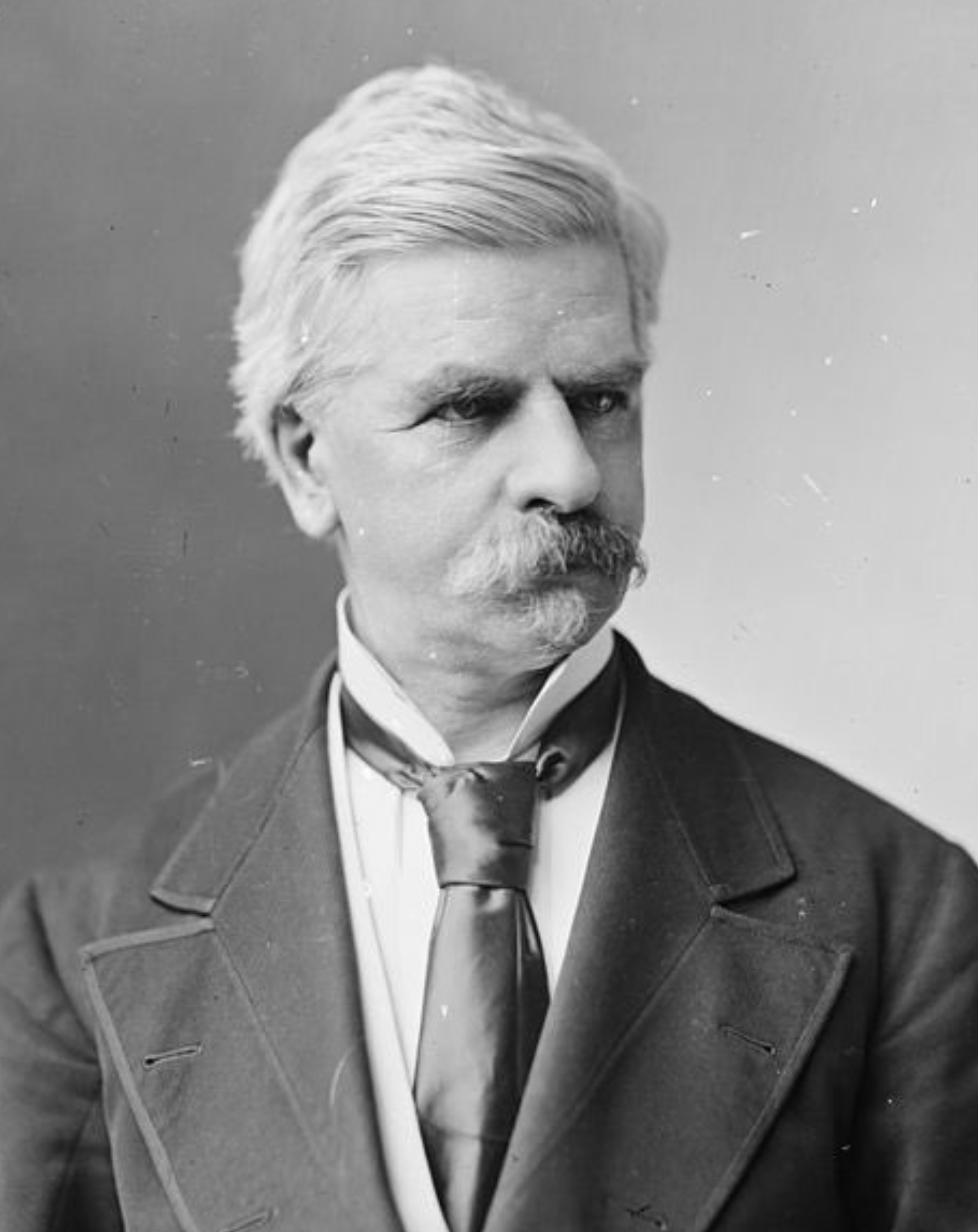
- Banks between 1865 and 1880

24th Governor of Massachusetts
- In office January 7, 1858 – January 3, 1861
- Lieutenant: Eliphalet Trask
- Preceded by: Henry Gardner
- Succeeded by: John Albion Andrew

21st Speaker of the United States House of Representatives
- In office February 2, 1856 – March 3, 1857
- Preceded by: Linn Boyd
- Succeeded by: James Lawrence Orr

Chairman of the House Republican Conference
- In office March 4, 1869 – March 3, 1871 Serving with Robert C. Schenck
- Speaker: James G. Blaine
- Preceded by: Justin S. Morrill (1867)
- Succeeded by: Austin Blair

Member of the U.S. House of Representatives from Massachusetts
- In office March 4, 1889 – March 3, 1891
- Preceded by: Edward D. Hayden
- Succeeded by: Sherman Hoar
- Constituency: 5th district
- In office March 4, 1875 – March 3, 1879
- Preceded by: Daniel W. Gooch
- Succeeded by: Selwyn Z. Bowman
- Constituency: 5th district
- In office December 4, 1865 – March 3, 1873
- Preceded by: Daniel W. Gooch
- Succeeded by: Benjamin Butler
- Constituency: 6th district
- In office March 4, 1853 – December 24, 1857
- Preceded by: John Z. Goodrich
- Succeeded by: Daniel W. Gooch
- Constituency: 7th district

Personal details
- Born: Nathaniel Prentice Banks; January 30, 1816 Waltham, Massachusetts, U.S.
- Died: September 1, 1894 (aged 78) Waltham, Massachusetts, U.S.
- Party: Democratic (1844–1854); American (1854–1857); Republican (1857–1872); Liberal Republican (1872–1873); Republican (1873–1891)
- Spouse: Mary Theodosia Palmer (m. 1847)
- Children: 4, including Maude Banks
- Occupation: Military officer; workman
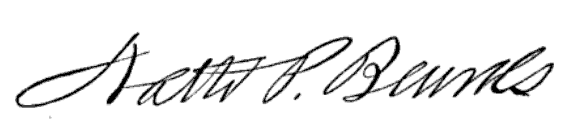
- Signature

Military service
- Allegiance: United States; Union
- Branch/service: United States Army; Union Army
- Years of service: 1861–1865
- Rank: Major General
- Commands: Army of the Shenandoah; V Corps; Army of the Gulf
- Battles/wars: American Civil War; Stonewall Jackson's Valley Campaign; First Battle of Kernstown; Battle of Front Royal; First Battle of Winchester; Northern Virginia Campaign; Battle of Cedar Mountain; Second Battle of Bull Run; Vicksburg Campaign; Siege of Port Hudson; Red River Campaign; Battle of Mansfield; Battle of Pleasant Hill

Nathaniel Prentice (or Prentiss) Banks (January 30, 1816 – September 1, 1894) was an American politician from Massachusetts and a Union general during the Civil War. A millworker, Banks became prominent in local debating societies and entered politics as a young adult. Initially a member of the Democratic Party, Banks's abolitionist views drew him to the nascent Republican Party, through which he won election to the United States House of Representatives and as Governor of Massachusetts in the 1850s. At the start of the 34th Congress, he was elected Speaker of the House in an election that spanned a record 133 ballots taken over the course of two months.

At the outbreak of the Civil War, Abraham Lincoln appointed Banks as one of the first political major generals, over the heads of West Point regulars, who initially resented him, but came to acknowledge his influence on the administration of the war. After suffering a series of inglorious setbacks in the Shenandoah River Valley at the hands of Stonewall Jackson, Banks replaced Benjamin Butler at New Orleans as commander of the Department of the Gulf, charged with the administration of Louisiana and gaining control of the Mississippi River. He failed to reinforce Grant at Vicksburg, and badly handled the Siege of Port Hudson, taking its surrender only after Vicksburg had fallen. He then launched the Red River Campaign, a failed attempt to occupy northern Louisiana and eastern Texas that prompted his recall. Banks was regularly criticized for the failures of his campaigns, notably in tactically important tasks, including reconnaissance. Banks was also instrumental in early reconstruction efforts in Louisiana, intended by Lincoln as a model for later such activities.

After the war, Banks returned to the Massachusetts political scene, serving in Congress, where he supported Manifest destiny, influenced the Alaska Purchase legislation, and supported women's suffrage. In his later years, he adopted more liberal progressive causes. He served as a United States marshal for Massachusetts before suffering a decline in his mental faculties.

== Early life ==
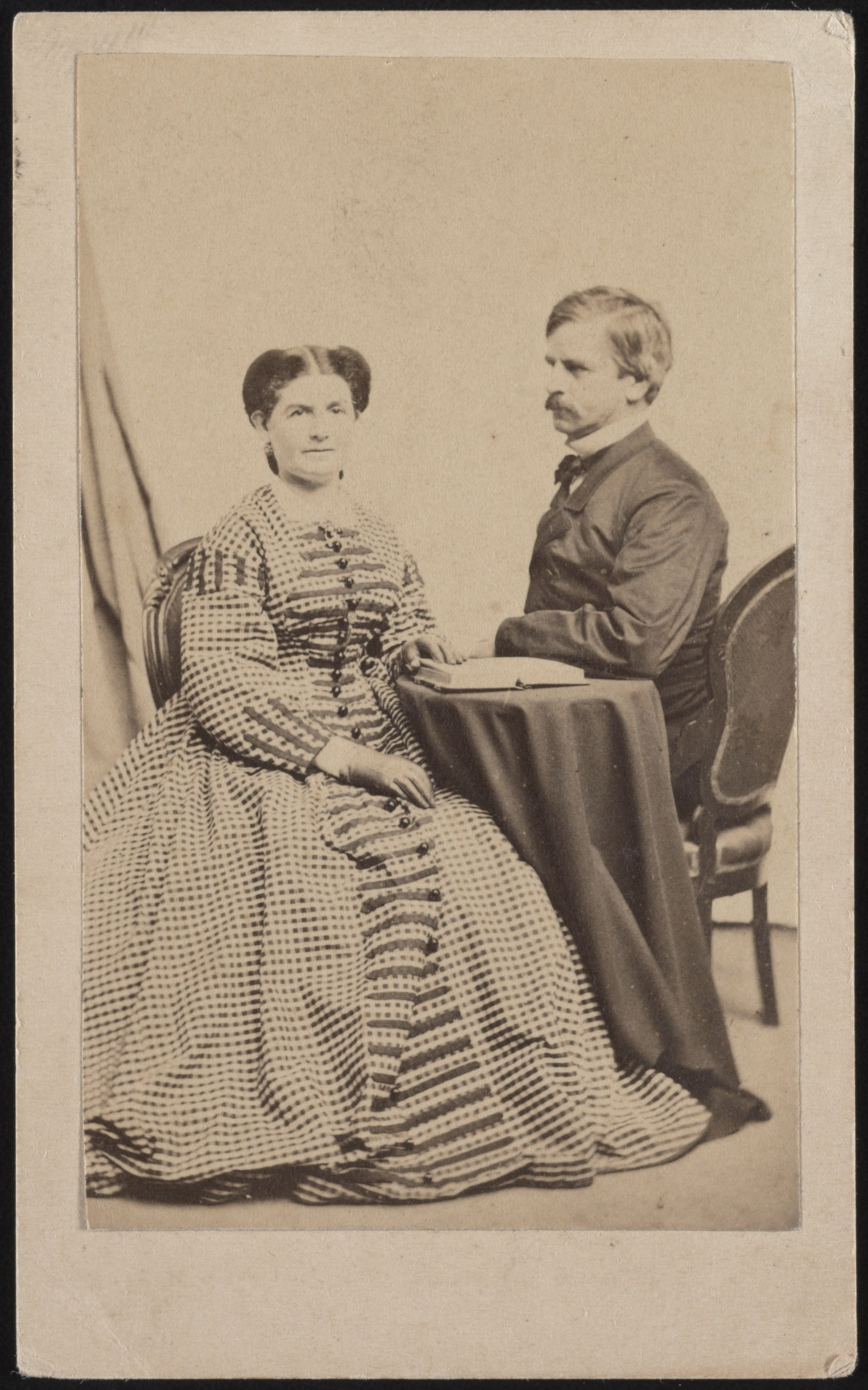
Major General Nathaniel Prentiss Banks of General Staff U.S. Volunteers Infantry Regiment in uniform, with his wife, Mary Theodosia Palmer Banks. From the Liljenquist Family Collection of Civil War Photographs, Prints and Photographs Division, Library of Congress

Nathaniel Prentice Banks was born at Waltham, Massachusetts, the first child of Nathaniel P. Banks Sr. and Rebecca Greenwood Banks, on January 30, 1816. His father worked in the textile mill of the Boston Manufacturing Company, eventually becoming a foreman. Banks went to local schools until the age of fourteen, at which point the family's financial demands compelled him to take a mill job. He started as a bobbin boy, responsible for replacing bobbins full of thread with empty ones, working in the mills of Waltham and Lowell. Because of this role he became known as Bobbin Boy Banks, a nickname he carried throughout his life. He was at one time apprenticed as a mechanic alongside Elias Howe, a cousin who later had the first patent for a sewing machine with a lockstitch design.

Recognizing the value of education, Banks continued to read, sometimes walking to Boston on his days off to visit the Atheneum Library. He attended company-sponsored lectures by luminaries of the day, including Daniel Webster and other orators. He formed a debate club with other mill workers to improve their oratorical skills and took up acting. He became involved in the local temperance movement; speaking at its events brought him to the attention of Democratic Party leaders, who asked him to speak at campaign events during the 1840 elections. He honed his oratorical and political skills by emulating Robert Rantoul Jr., a Democratic Congressman who also had humble beginnings. His personal good looks, voice, and flair for presentation were all assets that he used to gain advantage in the political sphere, and he deliberately sought to present himself with a more aristocratic bearing than was suggested by his humble beginnings.

Banks's success as a speaker convinced him to quit the mill. He first worked as an editor for two short-lived political newspapers; after they failed, he ran for a seat in the state legislature in 1844, but lost. He then applied for a job to Rantoul, who had been appointed Collector of the Port of Boston, a patronage position. Banks's job, which he held until political changes forced him out in 1849, gave him sufficient security that he was able to marry Mary Theodosia Palmer, an ex-factory employee he had been courting for some time. Banks again ran for the state legislature in 1847, but was unsuccessful.

== Antebellum political career ==
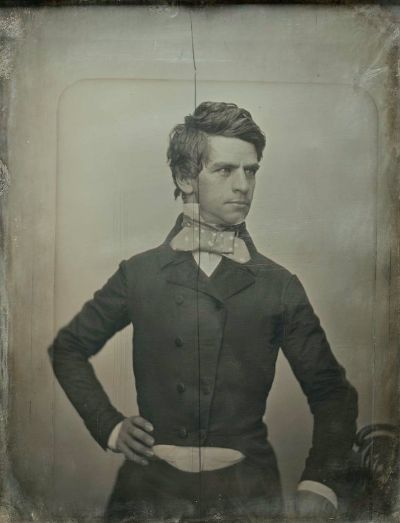
Banks in 1852, portrait by Southworth and Hawes

In 1848, Banks was victorious in another run for the state legislature, successfully organizing elements in Waltham whose votes were not easily controlled by the Whig-controlled Boston Manufacturing Company. Company leaders could effectively compel their workers to vote for Whig candidates because there was no secret ballot. He was at first moderate in opposition to the expansion of slavery, but recognizing the potency of the burgeoning abolitionist movement, he became more strongly attached to that cause as a vehicle for political advancement. This brought Banks, along with fellow Democrats Rantoul and George S. Boutwell to form a coalition with the Free Soil Party that successfully gained control of the legislature and governor's chair. The deals negotiated after the coalition's win in the 1850 election put Boutwell in the governor's chair and made Banks the Speaker of the Massachusetts House of Representatives. Although Banks did not like the radical Free Soiler Charles Sumner (either personally or for his strongly abolitionist politics), he supported the coalition agreement that resulted in Sumner's election to the United States Senate, despite opposition from conservative Democrats. His role as house speaker and his effectiveness in conducting business raised his status significantly, as did his publicity work for the state Board of Education.

=== Congress ===
In 1852, Banks sought the Democratic nomination for a seat in the United States Congress. While it was at first granted, his refusal to disavow abolitionist positions meant support was withdrawn by party conservatives. He ended up winning a narrow victory anyway, with Free Soil support. In 1853, he presided over the state Constitutional Convention of 1853. This convention produced a series of proposals for constitutional reform, including a new constitution, all of which were rejected by voters. The failure, which was led by Whigs and conservative anti-abolitionist Democrats, spelled the end of the Democratic-Free Soil coalition.

In Congress, Banks sat on the Committee of Military Affairs. He bucked the Democratic party line by voting against the Kansas–Nebraska Act, which overturned the 1820 Missouri Compromise, using his parliamentary skills in an effort to keep the bill from coming to a vote. Supported by his constituents, he then publicly endorsed the abolitionist cause. His opposition came despite long stated support for Manifest Destiny (the idea that the United States was destined to rule the North American continent), which the bill's proponents claimed it furthered. In 1854, he formally joined the so-called Know Nothing cause, a secretive populist and anti-immigration nativist movement – officially named American Party since 1855. He was renominated for Congress by the Democrats and Free Soilers, and won an easy victory in that year's Know Nothing landslide victory. Banks was, along with Henry Wilson and Governor Henry J. Gardner, considered one of the political leaders of the Know Nothing movement, although none of the three supported its extreme anti-immigrant positions of many of its supporters.

In 1855, Banks agreed to chair the convention of a new Republican Party convention, whose platform was intended to bring together antislavery interests from the Democrats, Whigs, Free Soilers, and Know Nothings. When Know Nothing Governor Henry Gardner refused to join in the fusion, Banks carefully kept his options open, passively supporting the Republican effort but also avoiding criticism of Gardner in his speeches. Gardner was reelected. During the summer of 1855, Banks was invited to speak at an antislavery rally in Portland, Maine, his first major speaking opportunity outside Massachusetts. In the speech, Banks expressed his opinion that the Union did not necessarily need to be preserved, say that under certain conditions it would be appropriate to "let [the Union] slide". Future political opponents would repeatedly use these words against him, accusing him of "disunionism".

At the opening of the 34th U.S. Congress in December 1855, after the Democrats had lost their majority and only made up 35% of the House, representatives from several parties opposed to slavery's spread gradually united in supporting the Know Nothing Banks for Speaker of the U.S. House of Representatives. After the longest speakership contests on record, lasting from December 3, 1855, to February 2, 1856, Banks was chosen on the 133rd ballot, receiving 103 votes out of 214 cast, or five less than an absolute majority. The coalition supporting him was formed by his American Party (known as the Know Nothing Party) and the Opposition Party, which opposed the Democrats, marking the first form of a coalition in congressional history. This victory was lauded at the time as the "first Republican victory" and "first Northern victory" – although Banks is officially affiliated as Speaker from the American Party – and greatly raised Banks's national profile. He gave antislavery men important posts in Congress for the first time, and cooperated with investigations of both the Kansas conflict and the caning of Charles Sumner on the floor of the Senate. Because of his fairness in dealing with the numerous factions, as well as his parliamentary ability, Banks was lauded by others in the body, including former Speaker Howell Cobb, who called him "in all respects the best presiding officer [I] had ever seen."

Banks played a key role in 1856 in bringing forward John C. Frémont as a moderate Republican presidential nominee. Because of his success as speaker, Banks was considered a possible presidential contender, and his name was put in nomination by supporters (knowing that he supported Frémont) at the Know Nothing convention, held one week before the Republicans met. Banks then refused the Know Nothing nomination, which went instead to former President Millard Fillmore. Banks was active on the stump in support of Frémont, who lost the election to James Buchanan. Banks easily won reelection to his own seat, though Democrats regained control of the House of Representatives. He was not re-nominated for speaker when the 35th Congress convened in December 1857.

=== Governor of Massachusetts ===
In 1857, Banks ran for Governor of Massachusetts against the incumbent Gardner. His nomination by the Republicans was contentious, with opposition coming primarily from radical abolitionist interests opposed to his comparatively moderate stand on the issue. After a contentious general election campaign Banks won a comfortable victory. One key action Banks took in support of the antislavery movement was the dismissal of Judge Edward G. Loring. Loring had ruled in 1854 that Anthony Burns, a fugitive slave, be returned to slavery under the terms of the Fugitive Slave Law of 1850. Under the pressure of a public petition campaign spearheaded by William Lloyd Garrison, the legislature passed two Bills of Address, in 1855 and 1856, calling for Loring's removal from his state office, but in both cases Gardner had declined to remove him. Banks signed a third such bill in 1858. He was rewarded with significant antislavery support, easily winning reelection in 1858.

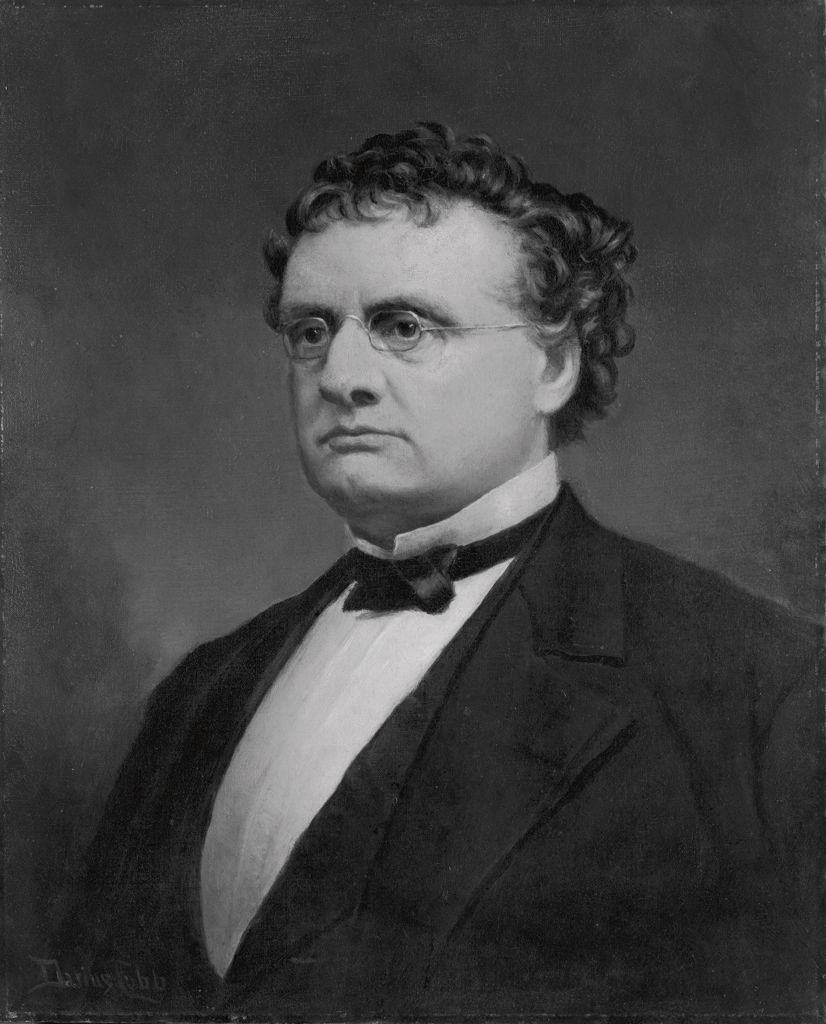
John Albion Andrew (portrait by Darius Cobb) succeeded Banks as governor.

Banks's 1859 reelection was influenced by two significant issues. One was a state constitutional amendment requiring newly naturalized citizens to wait two years before becoming eligible to vote. Promoted by the state's Know Nothings, it was passed by referendum in May of that year. Banks, catering to Know Nothing supporters, supported its passage, although Republicans elsewhere opposed such measures, because they were seeking immigrant votes. The amendment was repealed in 1863. The other issue was John Brown's raid on Harpers Ferry, which more radical Republicans (notably John Albion Andrew) supported. Not yet ready for armed conflict, the state voted for the more moderate Banks. After the election, Banks vetoed a series of bills, over provisions removing a restriction limiting state militia participation to whites. This incensed the radical abolitionist forces in the legislature, but they were unable to override his vetoes in that year's session, or of similar bills passed in the next.

Banks made a serious bid for the Republican presidential nomination in 1860, but dislike of him by the radicals in the state party harmed him. His failure to secure a majority in the state delegation prompted him to skip the national convention, where he received first-ballot votes as a nominee for Vice President. His attempt to promote Henry L. Dawes, another moderate Republican, as his successor in the governor's chair also failed: the party nominated the radical Andrew, who went on to win the general election. Banks's farewell speech, given with civil war looming, was an appeal for moderation and union.

During the summer of 1860, Banks accepted an offer to become a resident director of the Illinois Central Railroad, which had previously employed his mentor Robert Rantoul. Banks moved to Chicago after leaving office, and was engaged primarily in the promotion and sale of the railroad's extensive lands. He continued to speak out in Illinois against the breakup of the Union.

== Civil War ==
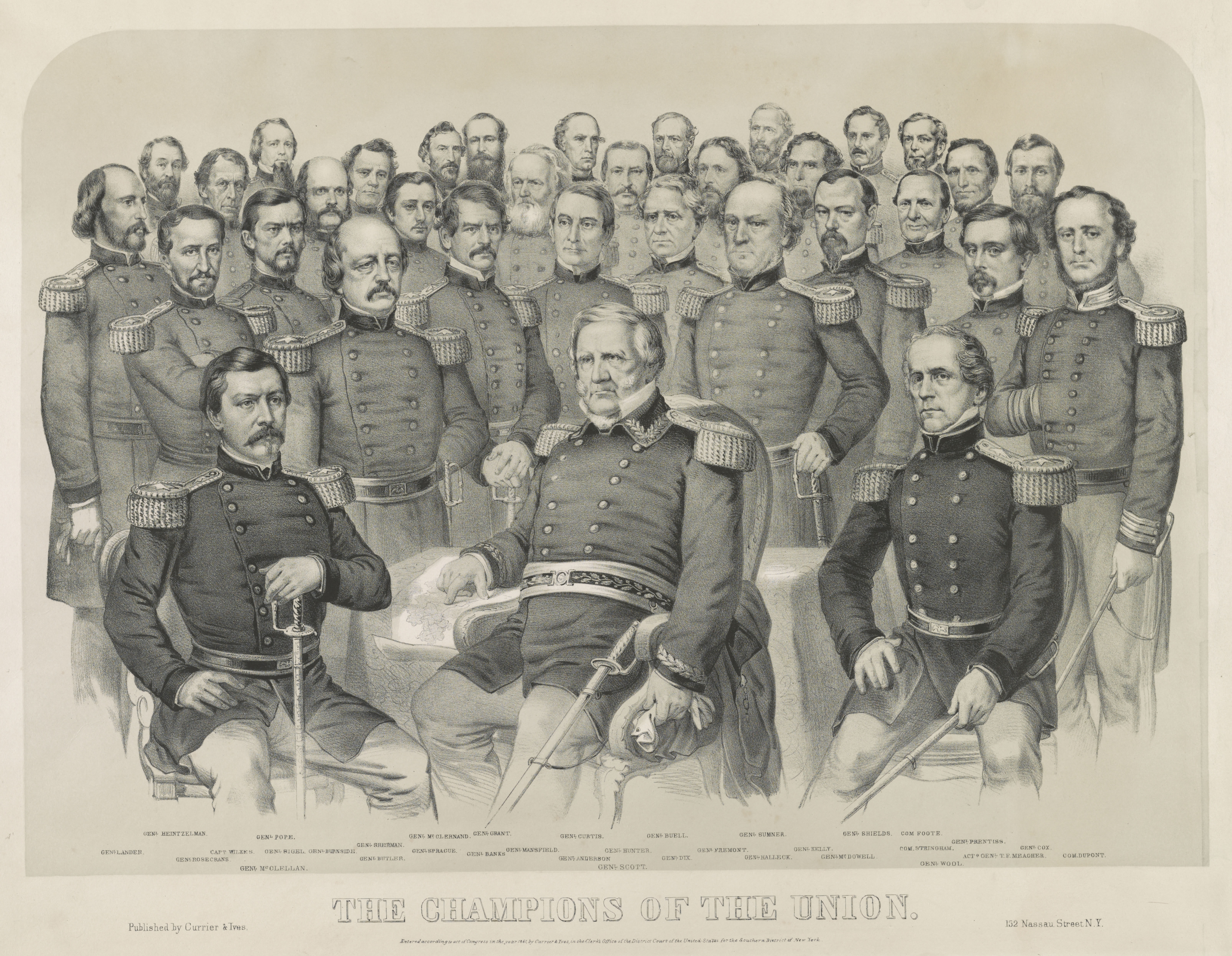
The champions of the Union, lithograph by Currier & Ives, 1861. Banks is among the frontmost standing figures, just left of the central seated figure, General Winfield Scott.

As the Civil War became imminent in early 1861, President Abraham Lincoln considered Banks for a cabinet post, despite a negative recommendation from Governor Andrew, who considered Banks to be unsuitable for any office. Lincoln rejected Banks in part because he had accepted the railroad job, but chose him as one of the first major generals (Maj. Gen.) of volunteers, appointing him on May 16, 1861. Many of the professional soldiers in the regular army were unhappy with this but Banks, given his national prominence as a leading Republican, brought political benefits to the administration, including the ability to attract recruits and money for the Union cause, despite his lack of field experience.

=== First command ===
Banks first commanded a military district in eastern Maryland, which notably included Baltimore, a hotbed of secessionist sentiment and a vital rail link. Banks for the most part stayed out of civil affairs, allowing political expression of secessionism to continue, while maintaining important rail connections between the north and Washington, DC. He did, however arrest the police chief and commissioners of the city of Baltimore, and replaced the police force with one that had more carefully vetted pro-Union sympathies. In August 1861, Banks was assigned to the western district of Maryland. There he was responsible for the arrest of legislators sympathetic to the Confederate cause (as was John Adams Dix, who succeeded Banks in the eastern district) in advance of legislative elections. This, combined with the release of local soldiers in his army to vote, ensured that the Maryland legislature remained pro-Union. Banks's actions had a chilling effect on Confederate sentiment in Maryland. Although it was a slave state, it remained loyal through the war.

=== Shenandoah Valley Campaign ===
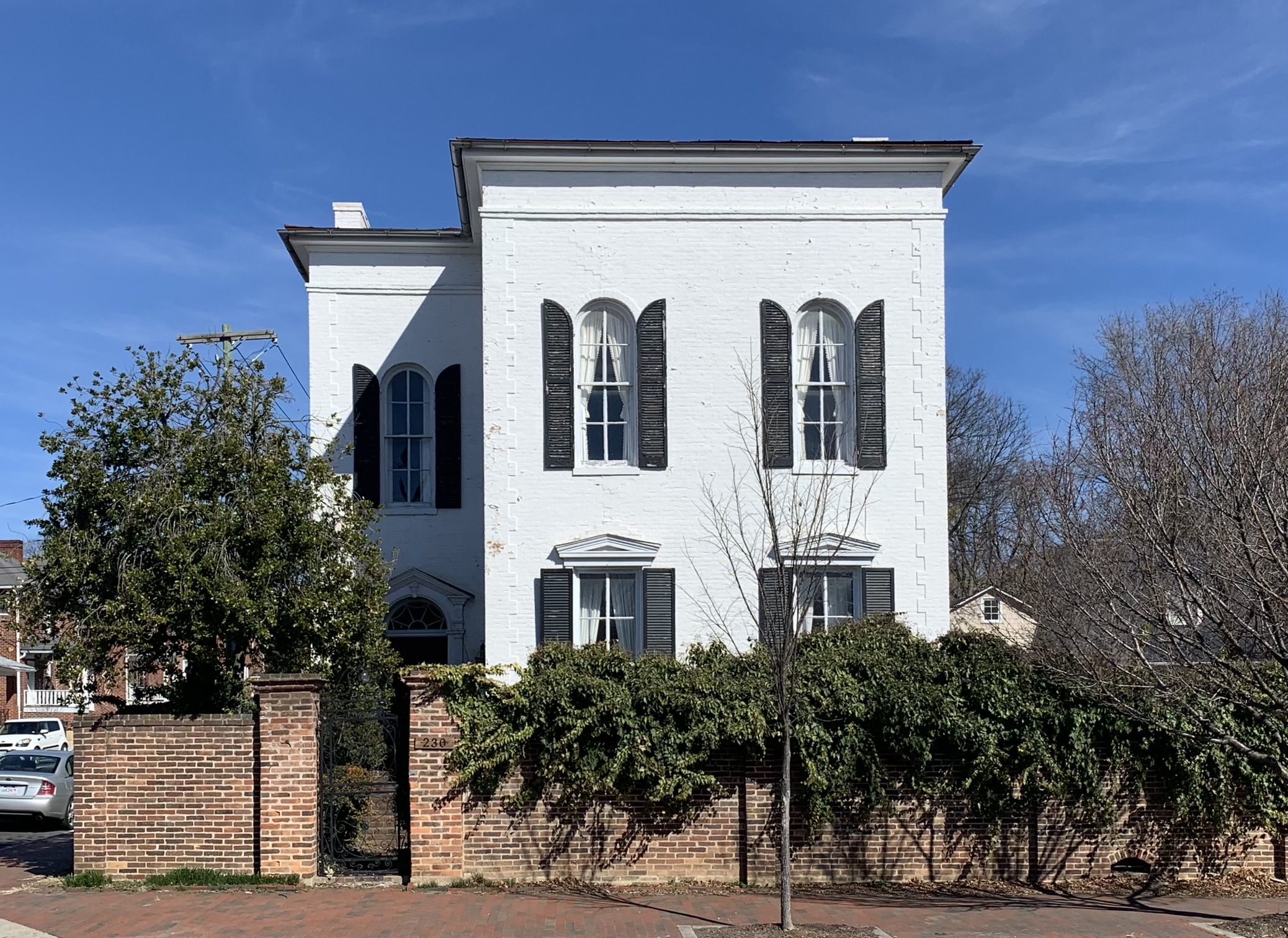
Banks' headquarters in Winchester, Virginia, during the Civil War

Banks's division technically belonged to George McClellan despite serving as an independent command in the Shenandoah Valley. On March 14, 1862, President Lincoln issued an executive order forming all troops in McClellan's department into corps. Banks thus became a corps commander, in charge of his own former division, now commanded by Brig. Gen Alpheus Williams, and the division of Brig. Gen James Shields, which was added to Banks's command. After Stonewall Jackson was turned back at the First Battle of Kernstown on March 23, Banks was instead ordered to pursue Jackson up the valley, to prevent him from reinforcing the defenses of Richmond. When Banks's men reached the southern Valley at the end of a difficult supply line, the president recalled them to Strasburg, at the northern end. Jackson then marched rapidly down the adjacent Luray Valley and encountered some of Banks' forces in the Battle of Front Royal on May 23. This prompted Banks to withdraw to Winchester, where Jackson again attacked on May 25. The Union forces were poorly arrayed in defense and retreated in disorder across the Potomac River and back into Maryland. An attempt to capture Jackson's forces in a pincer movement (with forces led by John Frémont and Irvin McDowell) failed, and Jackson was able to reinforce Richmond. Banks was criticized for mishandling his troops and performing inadequate reconnaissance in the campaign, while his political allies sought to pin the blame for the debacle on the War Department.

=== Northern Virginia Campaign ===
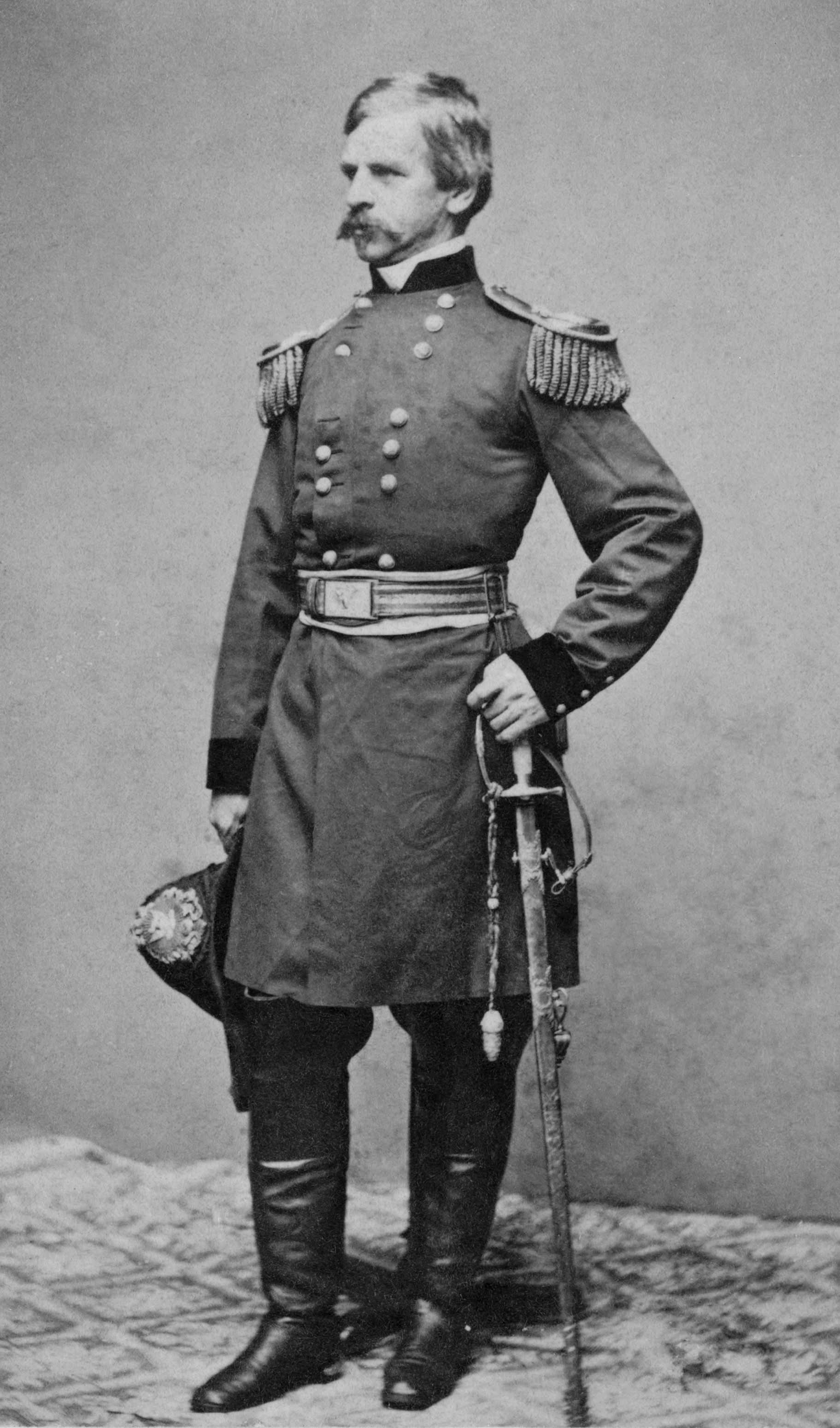
Banks in his military uniform, c. 1861, by Mathew Brady

In July, Maj. Gen John Pope was placed in command of the newly-formed Army of Virginia, which consisted of the commands of Banks, Irvin McDowell, and Franz Sigel. By early August, this force was in Culpeper County. Pope gave Banks an ambiguous series of orders, directing him south of Culpeper to determine enemy strength, hold a fortified defensive position, and to engage the enemy. Banks showed none of the caution he had displayed against Stonewall Jackson in the Valley campaign, and moved to meet a larger force. Confederates he faced were numerically stronger and held, particularly around Cedar Mountain, the high ground. After an artillery duel began the August 9 Battle of Cedar Mountain, he ordered a flanking maneuver on the Confederate right. Bank's bold attack seemed close to breaking in the Confederate line, and might have given him a victory if he had committed his reserves in a timely manner. Only excellent commanding by the Confederates at the crucial moment of the battle and the fortuitous arrival of Hill allowed their numerical superiority to tell. Banks thought the battle one of the "best fought"; one of his officers thought it an act of folly by an incompetent general."

The arrival at the end of the day of Union reinforcements under Pope, as well as the rest of Jackson's men, resulted in a two-day stand-off there, with the Confederates finally withdrawing from Cedar Mountain on August 11. Stonewall Jackson observed that Banks's men fought well, and Lincoln also expressed confidence in his leadership. During the Second Battle of Bull Run, Banks was stationed with his corps at Bristoe Station and did not participate in the battle. Afterwards, the corps was integrated into the Army of the Potomac as the XII Corps and marched north with the main army during the Confederate invasion of Maryland. On September 12, Banks was abruptly relieved of command.

=== Army of the Gulf ===
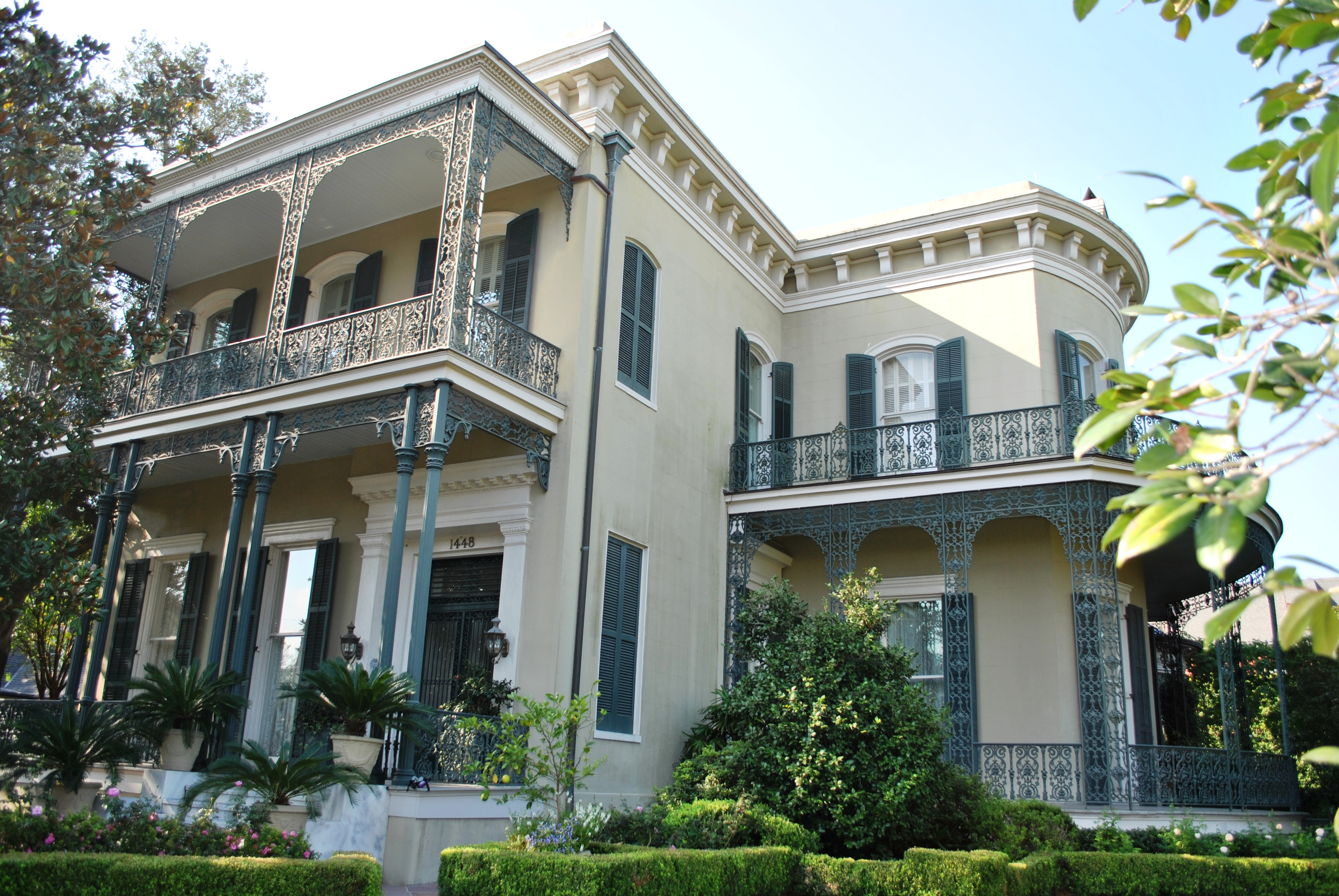
Colonel Short's Villa in New Orleans Garden District was the residence of Major General Nathaniel P. Banks, U.S. Commander, Department of the Gulf

In November 1862, President Lincoln gave Banks command of the Army of the Gulf, and asked him to organize a force of 30,000 new recruits, drawn from New York and New England. As a former governor of Massachusetts, he was politically connected to the governors of these states, and the recruitment effort was successful. In December, he sailed from New York with a large force of raw recruits to replace Maj. Gen. Benjamin Butler at New Orleans, Louisiana, as commander of the Department of the Gulf. Butler disliked Banks, but welcomed him to New Orleans and briefed him on civil and military affairs of importance. Gideon Welles, Secretary of the Navy, doubted the wisdom of replacing Butler (also a political general, and later a Massachusetts governor) with Banks, who he thought was a less able leader and administrator. Banks had to contend not just with Southern opposition to the occupation of New Orleans, but also to politically hostile Radical Republicans both in the city and in Washington, who criticized his moderate approach to administration.

=== Siege of Port Hudson ===
Part of Banks's orders included instructions to advance up the Mississippi River to join forces with Ulysses S. Grant, in order to gain control of the waterway, which was under Confederate control between Vicksburg, Mississippi and Port Hudson, Louisiana. Grant was moving against Vicksburg, and Banks was under orders to secure Port Hudson before joining Grant at Vicksburg. He did not move immediately, because the garrison at Port Hudson was reported to be large, his new recruits were ill-equipped and insufficiently trained for action, and he was overwhelmed by the bureaucratic demands of administering the occupied portions of Louisiana. He did send forces to reoccupy Baton Rouge, and sent a small expedition that briefly occupied Galveston, Texas but was evicted in the Battle of Galveston on January 1, 1863.

In 1862, several Union gunboats successfully passed onto the river between Vicksburg and Port Hudson, interfering with Confederate supply and troop movements. In March 1863, after they had been captured or destroyed, naval commander David Farragut sought to run the river past Port Hudson in a bid to regain control over that area, and convinced Banks to make a diversionary land attack on the Confederate stronghold. Banks marched with 12,000 men from Baton Rouge on March 13, but was unable to reach the enemy position due to inaccurate maps. He then compounded the failure to engage the enemy with miscommunications with Farragut. The naval commander successfully navigated two gunboats past Port Hudson, taking fire en route, without support. Banks ended up retreating back to Baton Rouge, his troops plundering all along the way. The episode was a further blow to Banks's reputation as a military commander, leaving many with the false impression that he had not wanted to support Farragut.

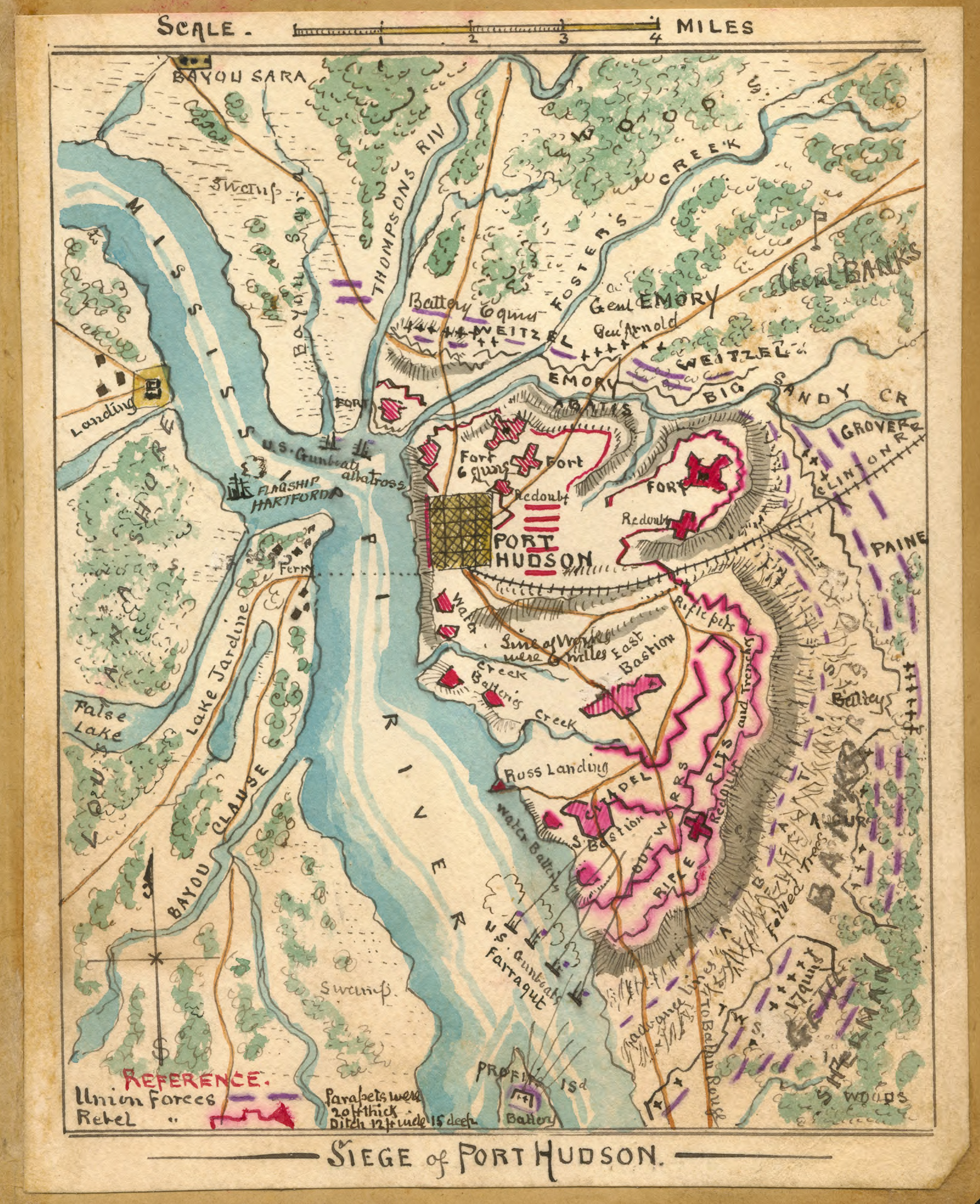
1860s map showing the Siege of Port Hudson

Under political pressure to show progress, Banks embarked on operations to secure a route that bypassed Port Hudson via the Red River in late March. He was eventually able to reach Alexandria, Louisiana, but stiff resistance from the smaller forces of Confederate General Richard Taylor meant he did not get there until early May. His army seized thousands of bales of cotton, and Banks claimed to have interrupted supplies to Confederate forces further east. During these operations, Admiral Farragut turned command of the naval forces assisting Banks over to David Porter, with whom Banks had a difficult and prickly relationship.

Following a request from Grant for assistance against Vicksburg, Banks finally laid siege to Port Hudson in May 1863. Two attempts to storm the works, as with Grant at Vicksburg, were dismal failures. The first, made against the entrenched enemy on May 27, failed because of inadequate reconnaissance and because Banks failed to ensure the attacks along the line were coordinated. After a bloody repulse, Banks continued the siege, and launched a second assault on June 14. It was also badly coordinated, and the repulse was equally bloody: each of the two attacks resulted in more than 1,800 Union casualties. The Confederate garrison under General Franklin Gardner surrendered on July 9, 1863, after receiving word that Vicksburg had fallen. This brought the entire Mississippi River under Union control. The siege of Port Hudson was the first time that African-American soldiers were used in a major Civil War battle. The United States Colored Troops were authorized in 1863, and recruiting and training had to be conducted.

In the autumn of 1863, Lincoln and Chief of Staff Henry Halleck informed Banks that plans should be made for operations against the coast of Texas, chiefly for the purpose of preventing the French in Mexico from aiding the Confederates or occupying Texas, and to interdict Confederate supplies from Texas heading east. The second objective he attempted to achieve at first by sending a force against Galveston; his troops were badly beaten in the Second Battle of Sabine Pass on September 8. An expedition sent to Brownsville secured possession of the region near the mouth of the Rio Grande and the Texas outer islands in November.

=== Red River Campaign ===
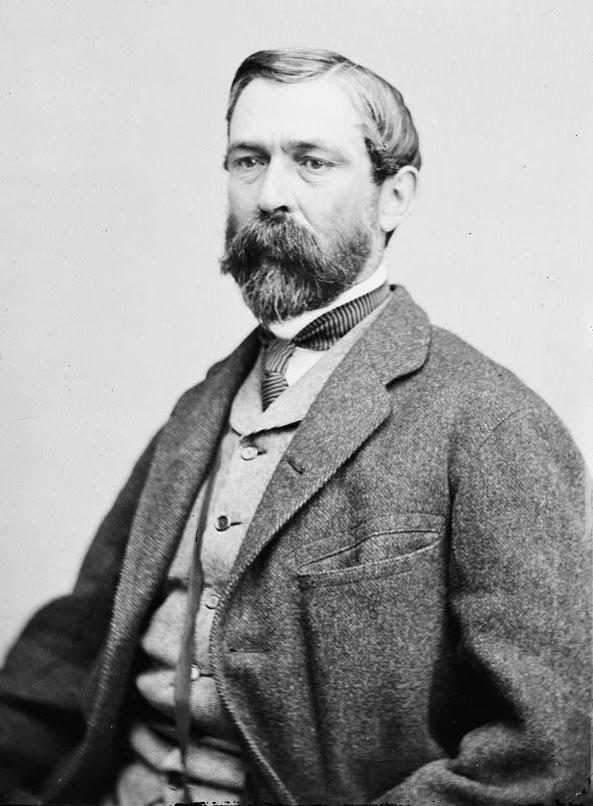
Confederate General Richard Taylor opposed Banks in Louisiana.

As part of operations against Texas, Halleck also encouraged Banks to undertake the Red River Campaign, an overland operation into the resource-rich but well-defended parts of northern Texas. Banks and General Grant both considered the Red River Campaign a strategic distraction, with an eastward thrust to capture Mobile, Alabama preferred. Political forces prevailed, and Halleck drafted a plan for operations on the Red River.

The campaign lasted from March to May 1864 and was a major failure. Banks's army was routed at the Battle of Mansfield (April 8) by General Taylor and retreated 20 miles (32 km) to make a stand the next day at the Battle of Pleasant Hill. Despite winning a tactical victory at Pleasant Hill, Banks continued the retreat to Alexandria, his force rejoining part of Porter's Federal Inland Fleet. That naval force had joined the Red River Campaign to support the army and to take on cotton as a lucrative prize of war. Banks was accused of allowing "hordes" of private cotton speculators to accompany the expedition, but only a few did, and most of the cotton seized was taken by the army or navy. Banks did little, however, to prevent unauthorized agents from working the area. A cooperating land force launched from Little Rock, Arkansas was turned back in the Camden Expedition.

Part of Porter's large fleet became trapped above the falls at Alexandria by low water, engineered by Confederates blowing a dam that had been constructed to artificially raise the water level when first entered by Porter's fleet. Banks and others approved a plan proposed by Joseph Bailey to build wing dams as a means to raise what little water was left in the channel. In ten days, 10,000 troops built two dams and managed to rescue Porter's fleet, allowing all to retreat to the Mississippi River. After the campaign, General William T. Sherman famously said of the Red River campaign that it was "One damn blunder from beginning to end", and Banks earned the dislike and loss of respect of his officers and rank and file for his mishandling of the campaign. On hearing of Banks's retreat in late April, Grant wired Chief of Staff Halleck asking for Banks to be removed from command. The Confederates held the Red River for the remainder of the war.

=== Louisiana Reconstruction ===
Banks undertook a number of steps intended to facilitate the Reconstruction plans of President Lincoln in Louisiana. When Banks arrived in New Orleans, the atmosphere was somewhat hostile to the Union owing to some of Butler's actions. Banks moderated some of Butler's policies, freeing civilians that Butler had detained and reopening churches whose ministers refused to support the Union. He recruited large numbers of African Americans for the military, and he instituted formal work and education programs to organize the many slaves who had left their plantations, believing they had been freed. Because Banks believed the plantation owners would need to play a role in Reconstruction, the work program was not particularly friendly to African Americans, requiring them to sign year-long work contracts and subjecting vagrants to involuntary public work. The education program was effectively shut down after Southerners regained control of the city in 1865.

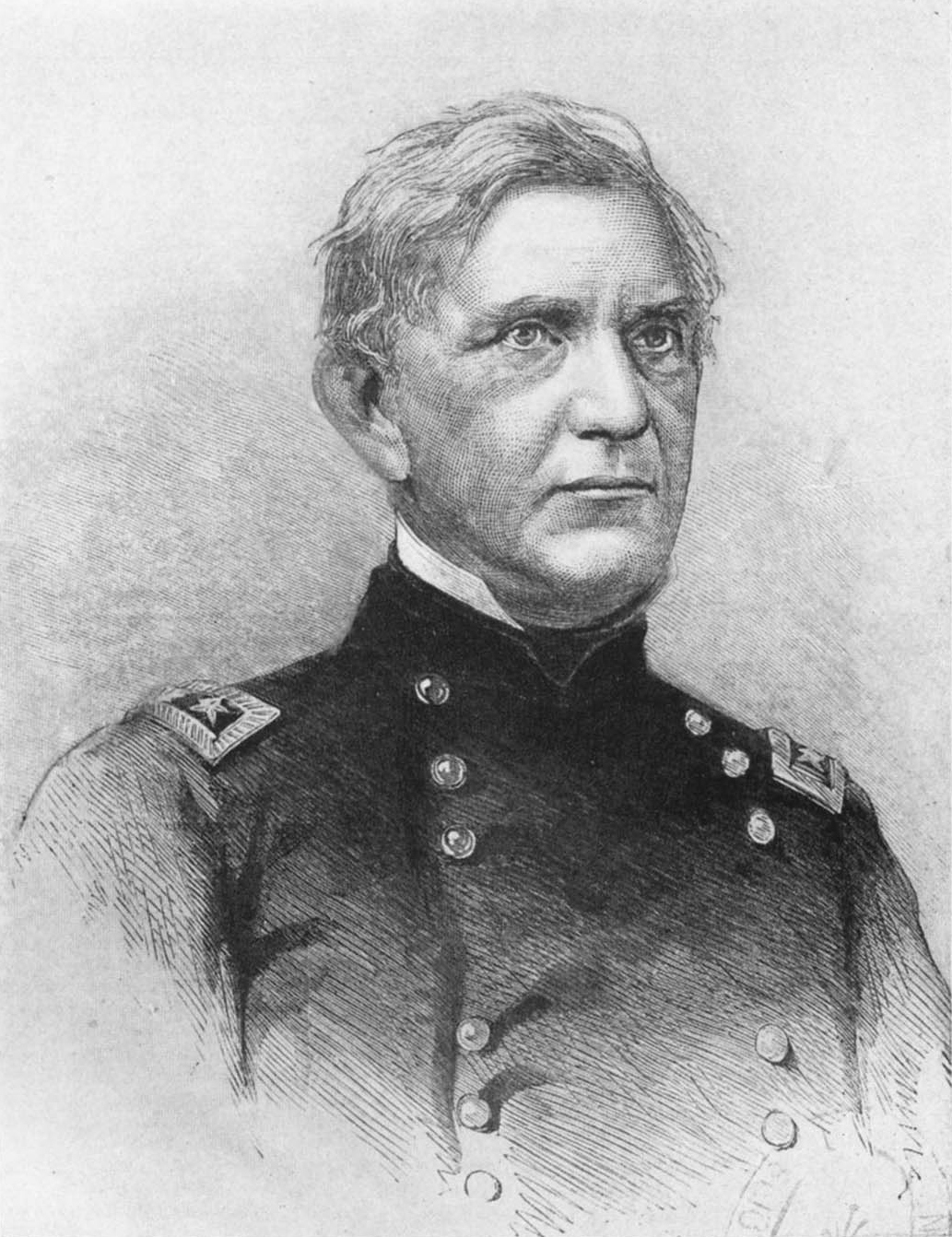
General Edward Canby succeeded Banks in Louisiana.

In August 1863, President Lincoln ordered Banks to oversee the creation of a new state constitution, and in December, he granted Banks wide-ranging authority to create a new civilian government. However, because voter enrollment was low, Banks canceled planned Congressional elections and worked with civilian authorities to increase enrollment rates. After a February 1864 election organized by Banks, a Unionist government was elected in Louisiana, and Banks optimistically reported to Lincoln that Louisiana would "become in two years, under a wise and strong government, one of the most loyal and prosperous States the world has ever seen." A constitutional convention held from April to July 1864 drafted a new constitution that provided for the emancipation of slaves. Banks was a significant influence on the convention, insisting that provisions be included for African-American education and at least partial suffrage.

By the time the convention ended, Banks's Red River Campaign had come to its ignominious end, and Banks was superseded in military (but not political) matters by Major General Edward Canby. President Lincoln ordered Banks to oversee elections held under the new constitution in September, and then ordered him to return to Washington to lobby Congress for acceptance of Louisiana's constitution and elected Congressmen. Radical Republicans in Congress railed against his political efforts in Louisiana, and refused to seat Louisiana's two Congressmen in early 1865. After six months, Banks returned to Louisiana to resume his military command under Canby. However, he was politically trapped between the civilian government and Canby, and resigned from the army in May 1865 after one month in New Orleans. He returned to Massachusetts in September 1865. In early 1865, Secretary of War Halleck ordered William Farrar Smith and James T. Brady to investigate breaches of Army regulations during the occupation of New Orleans. The commissioners' report, which was not published, found that the military administration was riddled by "oppression, peculation, and graft".

Military recognition of Banks's service in the war included election in 1867 and 1875 as commander of the Ancient and Honorable Artillery Company of Massachusetts. In 1892, he was elected as a Veteran First Class Companion of the Massachusetts Commandery of the Military Order of the Loyal Legion of the United States, a military society for officers who had served the Union during the Civil War.

== Postbellum career ==
On his return to Massachusetts, Banks immediately ran for Congress, for a seat vacated by the resignation of Radical Republican Daniel W. Gooch. The Massachusetts Republican Party, dominated by Radicals, opposed his run, but he prevailed easily at the state convention and in the general election, partially by wooing Radical voters by proclaiming support for Negro suffrage. He served from 1865 to 1873, during which time he chaired the Foreign Affairs Committee. Despite his nominally moderate politics, he was forced to vote with the Radicals on many issues, to avoid being seen as a supporter of President Johnson's policies. He was active in supporting the reconstruction work he had done in Louisiana, trying to get its Congressional delegation seated in 1865. He was opposed in this by a powerful faction in Louisiana, who argued he had essentially set up a puppet regime. He also alienated Radical Republicans by accepting a bill on the matter that omitted a requirement that states not be readmitted until they had given their African-American citizenry voting rights. Despite his position as chair of an important committee, Banks was snubbed by President Grant, who worked around him whenever possible.

During this period in Congress, Banks was one of the strongest advocates of Manifest destiny. He introduced the Annexation Bill of 1866 promoting offers to annex all of British North America (effectively today's Canada) in order to appeal to his heavily Irish-American constituency and to tap into the anger the American public felt towards Britain in its unofficial support for the Confederacy, such as blockade runners supplying weapons (which lengthened the war by two years and killed 400,000 additional Americans). This and other proposals he made died in the Senate Foreign Relations Committee, chaired by Charles Sumner. Banks also played a significant role in securing passage of the Alaska Purchase funding bill, enacted in 1868. Banks' financial records strongly suggest he received a large gratuity from the Russian minister after the Alaska legislation passed. Although questions were raised not long after the bill's passage, a House investigation of the matter effectively whitewashed the affair. Biographer Fred Harrington believes that Banks would have supported the legislation regardless of the payment he is alleged to have received. Banks also supported unsuccessful efforts to acquire some Caribbean islands, including the Danish West Indies and the Dominican Republic. He spoke out in support of Cuban independence.

In 1872, Banks joined the Liberal-Republican revolt in support of Horace Greeley. He had to some degree opposed a party trend away from labor reform, a subject that was close to many of his working-class constituents, but not the wealthy businessmen who were coming to dominate the Republican Party. While Banks was campaigning across the North for Greeley, the Radical Daniel W. Gooch successfully gathered enough support to defeat him for reelection; it was Banks' first defeat by Massachusetts voters. After his loss, Banks invested in an unsuccessful start-up Kentucky railroad headed by John Frémont, hoping its income would substitute for the political loss.

Seeking a revival of his political fortunes, in 1873, Banks ran successfully for the Massachusetts Senate, supported by a coalition of Liberal Republicans, Democrats, and Labor Reform groups. The latter groups he wooed in particular, adopting support for shorter workdays. In that term, he helped draft and secure passage of a bill restricting hours of women and children to ten hours per day. In 1874, Banks was elected to Congress again, supported by a similar coalition in defeating Gooch. He served two terms (1875–1879), losing in the 1878 nominating process after formally rejoining the Republican fold. He was accused in that campaign of changing his positions too often to be considered reliable. After his defeat, President Rutherford B. Hayes appointed Banks as a United States marshal for Massachusetts as a patronage reward for his service. He held the post from 1879 until 1888, but exercised poor oversight over his subordinates. He consequently became embroiled in legal action over the recovery of unpaid fees.

In 1888, Banks once again won a seat in Congress. He did not have much influence, because his mental health was failing. After one term he was not renominated, and retired to Waltham where he was diagnosed with dementia. His health continued to deteriorate, and he was briefly sent to McLean Hospital shortly before his death in Waltham on September 1, 1894. His death made nationwide headlines; he is buried in Waltham's Grove Hill Cemetery.

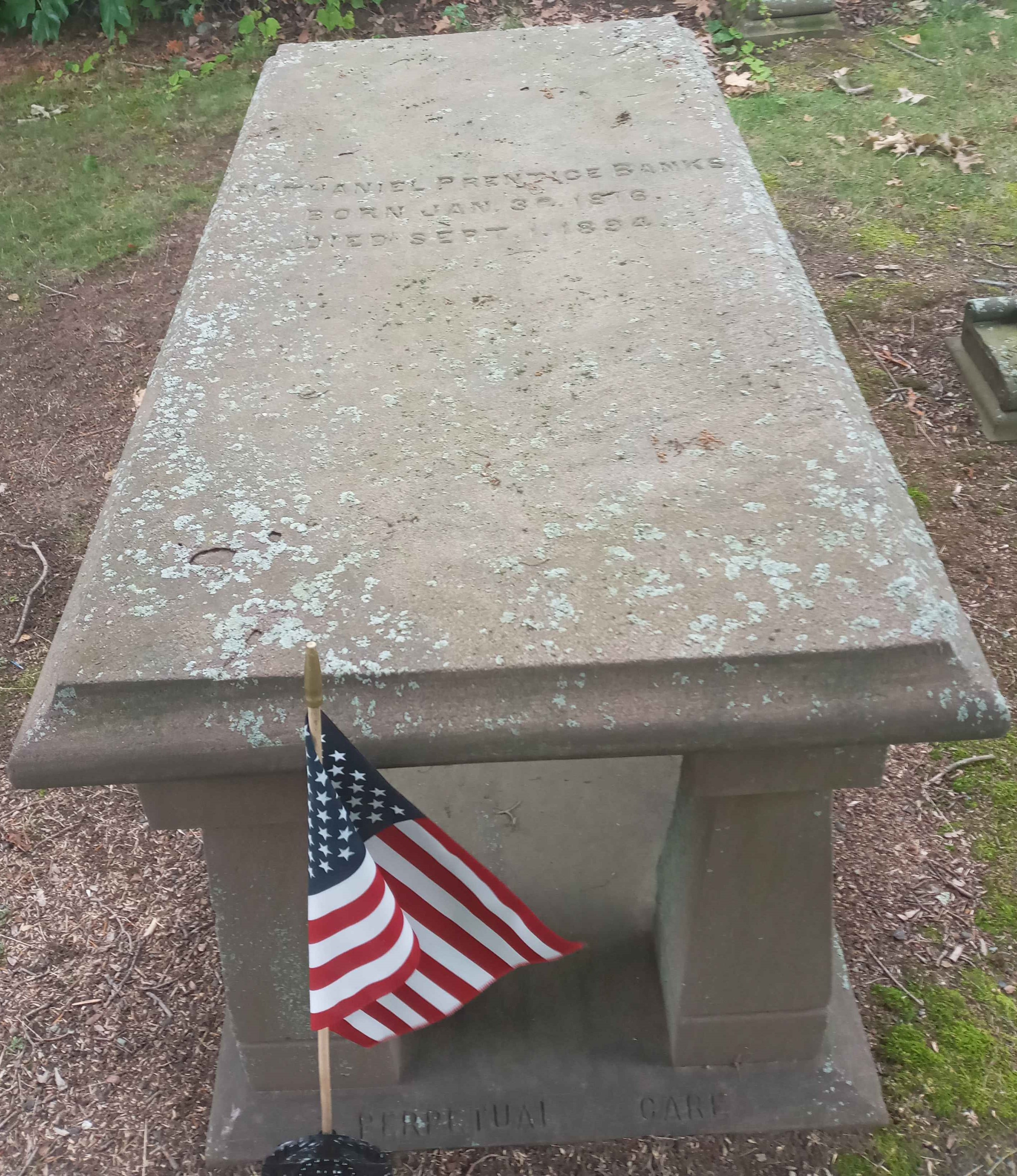
The gravesite of Nathaniel P. Banks

== Legacy and honors ==
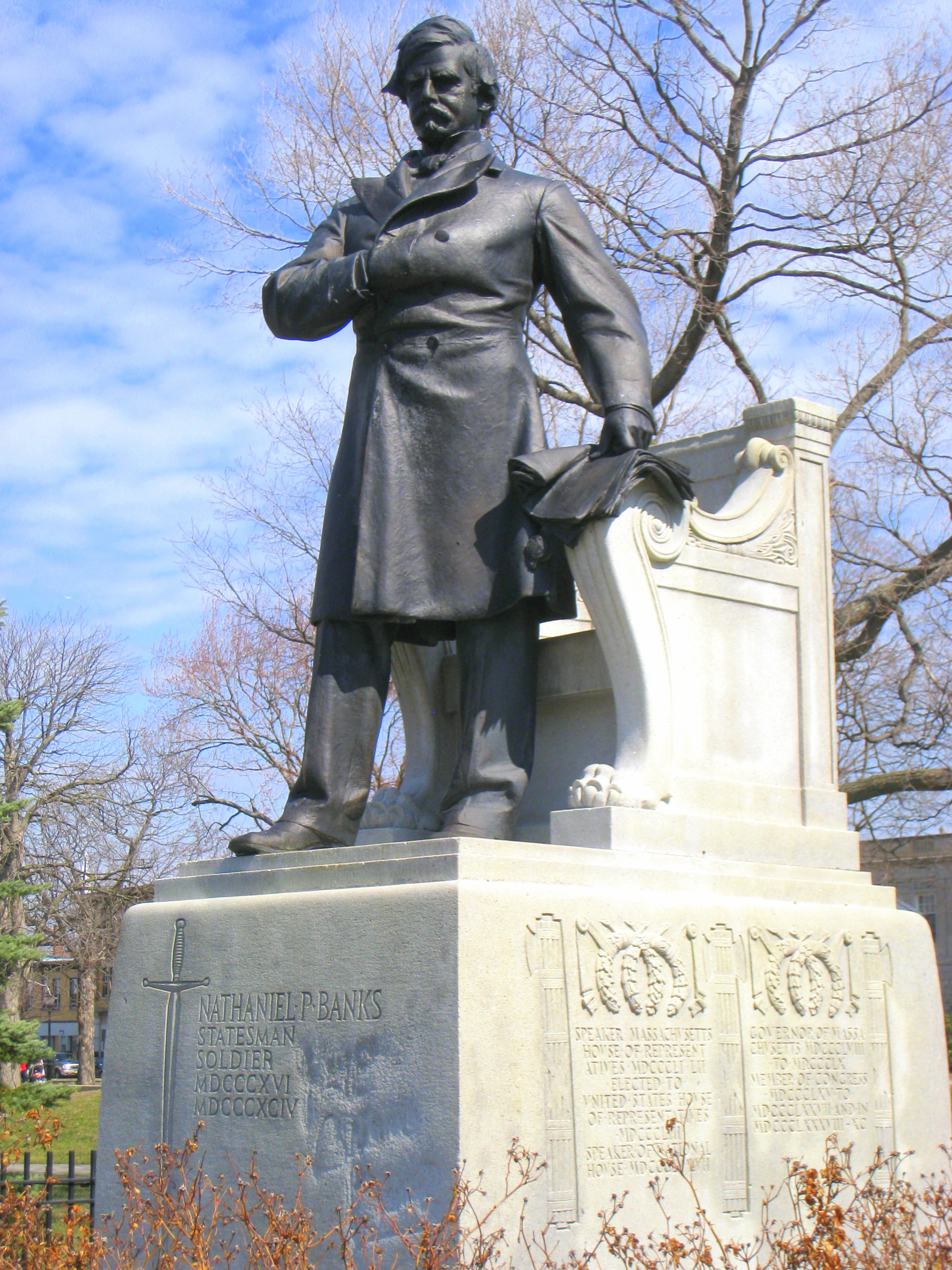
Statue of Banks by Henry Hudson Kitson in Waltham, Massachusetts

Fort Banks in Winthrop, Massachusetts, built in the late 1890s, was named for him. A statue of him stands in Waltham's Central Square, and Banks Court in Chicago's Gold Coast neighborhood is named after him. The incorporated village of Banks, Michigan, was named for him in 1871. The Gale-Banks House, his home in Waltham from 1855 to his death, is listed on the National Register of Historic Places.

== See also ==
- List of American Civil War generals (Union)
- List of Massachusetts generals in the American Civil War
- Massachusetts in the American Civil War
- Bibliography of the American Civil War
- Bibliography of American Civil War military leaders
- James Kendall Hosmer, American historian who served under Major-General Banks

== Sources ==
- Banks, Raymond H. (2025). General Nathaniel Prentice Banks: The War Years. Orlando: R.H. Banks. p. 778. ISBN 979-8-218-83208-7.
- Baum, Dale (1984). The Civil War Party System: The Case of Massachusetts, 1848–1876. Chapel Hill, NC: University of North Carolina Press. ISBN 978-0-8078-1588-5.
- Capers, Gerald (2015). Occupied City: New Orleans Under the Federals 1862–1865. Lexington, KY: University Press of Kentucky. ISBN 978-0-8131-6237-9. OCLC 900345154.
- Dawson, Joseph (1994). Army Generals and Reconstruction: Louisiana 1862–1877. Baton Rouge, LA: Louisiana State University Press. ISBN 978-0-8071-1960-0. OCLC 31399333.
- Dupree, Stephen (2008). Planting the Union flag in Texas: The Campaigns of Major General Nathaniel P. Banks in the West. College Station, TX: Texas A&M University Press. ISBN 978-1-58544-641-4. OCLC 153772989.
- Harrington, Fred Harvey (1948). Fighting Politician: Major General N. P. Banks. Philadelphia: University of Pennsylvania Press.
- Hewitt, Lawrence Lee (1994). Port Hudson, Confederate Bastion on the Mississippi. Baton Rouge, LA: LSU Press. ISBN 978-0-8071-1961-7. OCLC 31399457.
- Hollandsworth, James (1998). Pretense of Glory: The Life of General Nathaniel P. Banks. Baton Rouge, LA: Louisiana State University Press. ISBN 0-8071-2293-9.
- Johnson, Ludwell H (1993) [1958]. Red River Campaign: Politics and Cotton in the Civil War. Kent, OH: Kent State University Press. ISBN 978-0-87338-486-5. OCLC 27035762.
- Joiner, Gary (2002). One Damn Blunder from Beginning to End: The Red River Campaign of 1864. Wilmington, DE: Scholarly Resources. ISBN 978-0-8420-2936-0. OCLC 225998148.
- McPherson, James M. (1988). Battle Cry of Freedom: The Civil War Era. Oxford History of the United States. New York: Oxford University Press. ISBN 0-19-503863-0.
- Otto, David (August 17, 2010). Insiders Guide to Shreveport. Guilford, CT: Footprint. ISBN 978-0-7627-6340-5. OCLC 841494950.
- Patterson, Benton Rain (2014). Lincoln's Political Generals: The Battlefield Performance of Seven Controversial Appointees. Jefferson, NC: McFarland. ISBN 978-0-7864-7857-6. OCLC 877370980.
- Pearson, Henry (1904). The Life of John A. Andrew. Cambridge, MA: Houghton, Mifflin. OCLC 1453615. (Volume 1, Volume 2)
- Reef, Catherine (2009). Education and Learning in America. New York: Facts on File. ISBN 978-1-4381-2690-6. OCLC 435912035.
- Richards, Leonard (2015). Who Freed the Slaves?: The Fight Over the Thirteenth Amendment. Chicago: University of Chicago Press. ISBN 978-0-226-17820-2. OCLC 881469687.
- Robertson, Henry (2016). The Red River Campaign and Its Toll: 69 Bloody Days in Louisiana, March-May 1864. Jefferson, NC: McFarland. ISBN 978-1-4766-2447-1. OCLC 946887780.
- Rosenberg, Chaim (2004). The Great Workshop: Boston's Victorian Age. Charleston, SC: Arcadia Publishing. ISBN 978-0-7385-2468-9. OCLC 60246514.
- Smith, Justin Harvey (1903). The Historie Booke: Done to Keep in Lasting Remembrance the Joyous Meeting of the Honourable Artillery Company of London and the Ancient and Honorable Artillery Company of the Massachusetts in the Towne of Boston, A.D. 1903. Norwood, MA: The Norwood Press. OCLC 3623362.
- Von Frank, Albert (1998). The Trials of Anthony Burns. Cambridge, MA: Harvard University Press. ISBN 978-0-674-03954-4. OCLC 37721476.
- Voss-Hubbard, Mark (August 1995). "The Political Culture of Emancipation: Morality, Politics, and the State in Garrisonian Abolitionism, 1854–1863". Journal of American Studies. 29 (2): 159–184. doi:10.1017/S0021875800020806. JSTOR 27555920. S2CID 145353199.
- Tunnell, Ted (1984). Crucible of Reconstruction: War, Radicalism and Race in Louisiana; 1862–1877. Baton Rouge, LA: Louisiana State University Press. ISBN 978-0-8071-1803-0.
- Winters, John D. (1963). The Civil War in Louisiana. Baton Rouge: Louisiana State University Press. OCLC 1391726.
- Work, David (2012) [2009]. Lincoln's Political Generals. Urbana, IL: University of Illinois Press. ISBN 978-0-252-07861-3. OCLC 776777739.

Party political offices
Preceded by Henry Gardner	Republican nominee for Governor of Massachusetts; 1857, 1858, 1859	Succeeded by John Albion Andrew
Military offices
Preceded by Robert Patterson	Commander of the Department of the Shenandoah; July 25, 1861 – March 18, 1862	Succeeded by Command reorganized as V Corps
Preceded by Himself as Commander of Department of the Shenandoah	Commander of V Corps; March 18, 1862–4 April 1862	Succeeded by Command reorganized as Department of the Shenandoah
Preceded by Himself as commander of V Corps	Commander of the Department of the Shenandoah; April 4, 1862 – June 26, 1862	Succeeded by Command reorganized as II Corps Army of Virginia
Preceded by Himself as Commander of Department of the Shenandoah	Commander of II Corps Army of Virginia; June 26, 1862 – September 12, 1862	Succeeded by Alpheus S. Williams
Preceded by Benjamin Butler	Commander of the Department of the Gulf; December 15, 1862 – September 23, 1864	Succeeded by Stephen A. Hurlbut
Political offices
Preceded by Henry J. Gardner	Governor of Massachusetts; January 7, 1858 – January 3, 1861	Succeeded by John A. Andrew
U.S. House of Representatives
Preceded by John Z. Goodrich	Member of the U.S. House of Representatives from Massachusetts's 7th congressional district March 4, 1853 – December 24, 1857	Succeeded by Daniel W. Gooch
Preceded by Linn Boyd	Speaker of the U.S. House of Representatives; February 2, 1856 – March 3, 1857	Succeeded by James L. Orr
Preceded by Daniel W. Gooch	Member of the U.S. House of Representatives from Massachusetts's 6th congressional district December 4, 1865 – March 3, 1873	Succeeded by Benjamin Butler
Preceded by Daniel W. Gooch	Member of the U.S. House of Representatives from Massachusetts's 5th congressional district March 4, 1875 – March 3, 1879	Succeeded by Selwyn Z. Bowman
Preceded by Edward D. Hayden	Member of the U.S. House of Representatives from Massachusetts's 5th congressional district March 4, 1889 – March 3, 1891	Succeeded by Sherman Hoar
