= Timothy Davis (Massachusetts politician) =

American politician

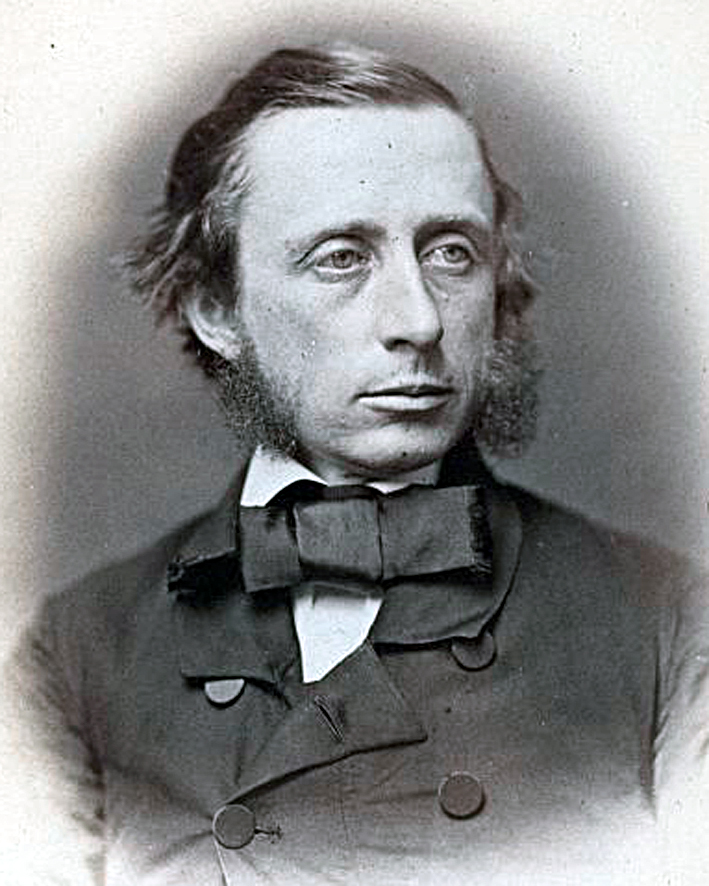

Member of the U.S. House of Representatives from Massachusetts's 6th district
- In office March 4, 1855 – March 3, 1859
- Preceded by: Charles Wentworth Upham
- Succeeded by: John B. Alley

Member of the Massachusetts House of Representatives
- In office 1870-1871

Personal details
- Born: April 12, 1821 Gloucester, Massachusetts, U.S.
- Died: October 23, 1888 (aged 67) Boston, Massachusetts, U.S.
- Party: American Party, Republican
- Profession: Printer, Merchant

Timothy Davis (April 12, 1821 – October 23, 1888) was a member of the United States House of Representatives from Massachusetts.

Davis was born in Gloucester, Massachusetts and attended the public schools. He served two years in a printing office, engaged in mercantile pursuits in Boston.

== Political career ==
Davis served as member of the Massachusetts House of Representatives in 1870 and 1871. He was elected as the candidate of the American Party to the Thirty-fourth Congress and as a Republican to the Thirty-fifth Congress (March 4, 1855 – March 3, 1859).

== Life after Congress ==
Davis served as delegate to the Republican National Convention in 1860. He was appointed assistant appraiser in the Boston customhouse in 1861. He engaged in the prosecution of claims against the Government. He died in Boston, Massachusetts, on October 23, 1888. He was interred in Oak Grove Cemetery.

U.S. House of Representatives
Preceded by Charles W. Upham	Member of the U.S. House of Representatives from Massachusetts's 6th congressional district March 4, 1855-March 3, 1859	Succeeded by John B. Alley
