= Giles Crouch Kellogg =

American politician (1781–1861)

Giles Crouch Kellogg (August 12, 1781 – June 19, 1861) was an American politician.

== Early life ==
Giles Crouch Kellogg was born on August 12, 1781, in Hadley, Massachusetts, to Mary (née Catlin) and Dr. Giles C. Kellogg. He graduated from Yale University in 1800. He studied law with Jonathan E. Porter and was admitted to the bar in Hampshire County.

== Career ==
Kellogg opened a law office in Hadley. He served as the town clerk and treasurer and was register of deeds for Hampshire County for 13 years. He was a representative to the General Court of Massachusetts. He was a member of the Massachusetts Constitutional Convention of 1853. In the War of 1812, he served as an adjutant in one of the Massachusetts regiments.

Kellogg was an educator at Hopkins Academy in Hadley. He served in the Massachusetts Senate.

== Personal life ==
Kellogg died on June 19, 1861, in Hadley. A monument was erected at Old Hadley Cemetery in his honor.
