= Edward D. Hayden =

American politician (1833-1908)

Edward Daniel Hayden
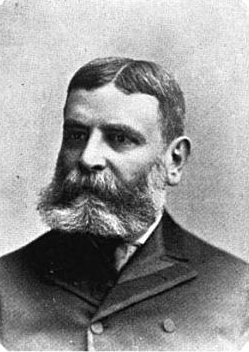

Member of the U.S. House of Representatives from Massachusetts's 5th district
- In office March 4, 1885 – March 3, 1889
- Preceded by: Leopold Morse
- Succeeded by: Nathaniel P. Banks

Member of the Massachusetts House of Representatives 13th Middlesex District
- In office 1880–1882

Personal details
- Born: December 27, 1833 Cambridge, Massachusetts, U.S.
- Died: November 15, 1908 (aged 74) Woburn, Massachusetts, U.S.
- Resting place: Mount Auburn Cemetery
- Party: Republican
- Spouse(s): Marcia N, Winne, m. 1860 d. 1862;
- Education: Harvard

Military service
- Allegiance: United States of America
- Branch/service: Navy
- Battles/wars: American Civil War; Vicksburg and Red River campaigns

Edward Daniel Hayden (December 27, 1833 – November 15, 1908) was a U.S. representative from Massachusetts.

== Biography ==
=== Early life ===
Born in Cambridge, Massachusetts, Hayden attended the Lawrence Academy, Groton, Massachusetts, and graduated from Harvard University in 1854. He studied law. He was admitted to the bar in 1857 and commenced practice in Woburn, Massachusetts.

=== Civil War service ===
He entered the United States Navy as assistant paymaster in 1861, and served in the Mississippi Squadron under Admiral David D. Porter in the Vicksburg and Red River campaigns. After the war, he was elected as a companion of the Massachusetts Commandery of the Military Order of the Loyal Legion of the United States.

=== Post war ===
He returned to Woburn, Massachusetts, in 1866 and engaged in mercantile pursuits. He served as president of the First National Bank 1874–1900.

=== Political career ===
He served as a selectman and later as an alderman in Woburn and then served as a member of the Massachusetts House of Representatives from 1880 to 1882. Hayden was elected as a Republican to the Forty-ninth and Fiftieth Congresses (March 4, 1885 – March 3, 1889) and was not a candidate for renomination in 1888. He served as a delegate to the Republican National Convention in 1888.

He served for more than thirty years on the directorate of the Boston & Albany Railroad, and at the time of his death was vice president.

He served as a director of the Shawmut National Bank of Boston.

=== Death and burial ===
He died in Woburn, Massachusetts, November 15, 1908. He was interred in Mount Auburn Cemetery, Cambridge, Massachusetts.

U.S. House of Representatives
Preceded by Leopold Morse	Member of the U.S. House of Representatives from Massachusetts's 5th congressional district 1885–1889	Succeeded by Nathaniel P. Banks
Political offices
Preceded by	Member of the Massachusetts House of Representatives 13th Middlesex District; 1881–1882	Succeeded by
