= Freeman Clark Griswold =

American politician

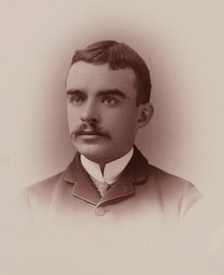
- Griswold, c. 1888

Member of the Massachusetts House of Representatives
- In office 1888–1888

Personal details
- Born: December 15, 1858 Greenfield, Massachusetts
- Died: January 29, 1910 (aged 51) Boston, Massachusetts
- Party: Democratic
- Education: Williston Seminary, 1877; Yale University, 1881; Harvard Law School, LLB, 1884
- Profession: Attorney

Freeman Clark Griswold (December 15, 1858 – January 29, 1910) was an American lawyer and politician who served as a member of the Massachusetts House of Representatives.

== Early life ==
Griswold was born to Whiting and Fannie L. (Clark) Griswold. He was left an orphan in 1874 when his father died.

== Education ==
Griswold attended Williston Seminary graduating in 1877, then attended Yale University graduating with his A.B. in 1881. He then entered Harvard Law School, graduating with his L.L.B. in 1884.
