= Leopold Morse =

American politician (1831-1892)

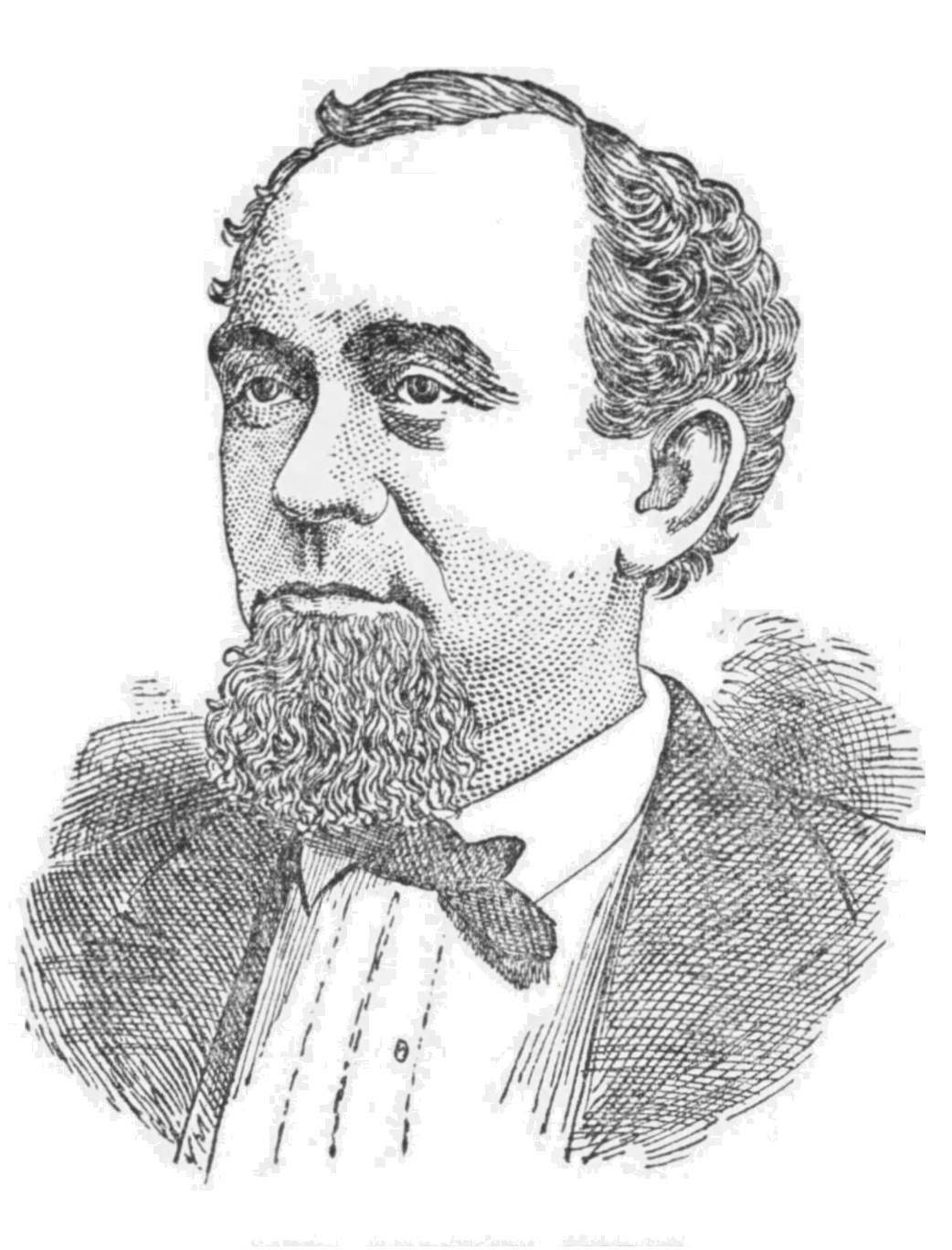

Member of the U.S. House of Representatives from Massachusetts
- In office March 4, 1877 – March 3, 1885
- Preceded by: Josiah Gardner Abbott
- Succeeded by: Edward D. Hayden
- Constituency: 4th district (1877–83); 5th district (1883–85)
- In office March 4, 1887 – March 3, 1889
- Preceded by: Ambrose Ranney
- Succeeded by: John F. Andrew
- Constituency: 3rd district

Personal details
- Born: August 15, 1831 Wachenheim, Bavaria, German Confederation
- Died: December 15, 1892 (aged 61) Boston, Massachusetts, U.S.
- Party: Democratic
- Profession: Clothier

Leopold Morse (August 15, 1831 – December 15, 1892) was a United States representative from Massachusetts.

== Biography ==
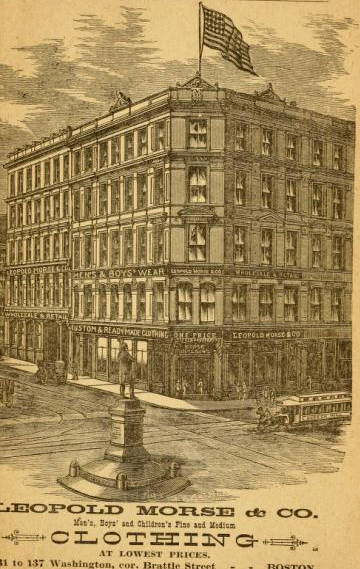
Leopold Morse's Store in Boston, cir. 1886

Morse was born in Wachenheim, Bavaria, in the German Confederation, the son of Charlotte (Mehlinger) and Jacob Morse. His family was Jewish. He attended the common schools in Wachenheim. He immigrated to the United States in 1849 and resided for about a year in Sandwich, New Hampshire.

He moved to Boston, Massachusetts and worked in a clothing store, which he later purchased and operated until his death.

About 1850 Morse opened a clothing store in New Bedford, Massachusetts.

Morse was a delegate to the Democratic National Convention in 1876 and 1880. He was an unsuccessful Democratic candidate in 1870 and 1872 for election to the Forty-second and Forty-third Congresses. The Boston Globe later noted that "few men step, as he did, from private station, immediately upon the floor of Congress, and he [had] never gone before the people except as a candidate for membership in that body". He was elected to the Forty-fifth and to the three succeeding Congresses (March 4, 1877 - March 3, 1885). He served as chairman of the Committee on Expenditures in the Department of the Navy (Forty-eighth Congress). He declined to accept a renomination in 1884. Morse was elected president of the Post Publishing Co. publisher of The Boston Post, in that year. He returned to elected office as a Representative to the Fiftieth Congress (March 4, 1887 - March 3, 1889). He served as chairman of the U.S. House Committee on Expenditures in the Department of State for the Congress.

Morse was not a candidate for renomination in 1888. He resumed business activities, and died in Boston on December 15, 1892.

Morse was interred in Mount Auburn Cemetery in Cambridge.

Morse's brother was lawyer Godfrey Morse.

U.S. House of Representatives
Preceded by Josiah Gardner Abbott	Member of the U.S. House of Representatives from Massachusetts's 4th congressional district March 4, 1877 - March 3, 1883	Succeeded by Patrick A. Collins
Preceded by Selwyn Z. Bowman	Member of the U.S. House of Representatives from Massachusetts's 5th congressional district March 4, 1883 - March 3, 1885	Succeeded by Edward D. Hayden
Preceded by Ambrose Ranney	Member of the U.S. House of Representatives from Massachusetts's 3rd congressional district March 4, 1887 - March 3, 1889	Succeeded by John F. Andrew

== See also ==
- List of Jewish members of the United States Congress
