= Massachusetts's 5th congressional district =

U.S. House district for Massachusetts

Coordinates: 42°21′19″N 71°17′54″W

- Interactive map of district boundaries since January 3, 2023
- Representative: Katherine Clark; D–Revere
- Population (2025): 792,642
- Median household income: $121,869
- Ethnicity: 64.6% White; 12.8% Asian; 10.5% Hispanic; 5.1% Two or more races; 5.0% Black; 2.0% other
- Cook PVI: D+24

Massachusetts's 5th congressional district is a congressional district in eastern Massachusetts. The district is represented by Katherine Clark of the Democratic Party. Massachusetts's congressional redistricting after the 2010 census changed the borders of the district starting with the elections of 2012, with the new 3rd District largely taking the place of the old 5th. The 5th District covers many of the communities represented in the old 7th District.

On July 15, 2013, Ed Markey resigned from the seat to become the junior Senator from Massachusetts. On December 10, 2013, Democrat Katherine Clark won a special election to fill the seat for the remainder of the 113th Congress. She was sworn into office on December 12, 2013, and since January 2023 serves as the House Minority Whip.

The district has been in Democratic hands without interruption since 1975. Before Paul Tsongas' victory that year, it had only elected three Democrats in its entire existence and had been in Republican hands since 1895. It was one of the more moderate districts in heavily Democratic Massachusetts before redistricting in 2013. In state races, it supported Republican candidates for Governor William Weld, Paul Celluci, and Mitt Romney. In the 2007 special election to replace Marty Meehan, Republican candidate Jim Ogonowski ran an unexpectedly strong race before ultimately losing, 51–45%.

== Composition ==
Massachusetts's congressional redistricting after the 2020 census (commencing with the 2022 election and the 118th Congress, whose House members were sworn in on January 3, 2023) assigns the 5th congressional district to much of Middlesex County, part of Norfolk County, and part of Suffolk County. It is the wealthiest congressional district in Massachusetts, and in 2024, was the eighteenth-wealthiest nationally, with 30.1 percent of households earning over $200,000.

== History and geography ==
=== Current ===
There are 23 municipalities in the 5th district, as of the 2021 redistricting. This list is sorted by county.

Middlesex County (20)

Arlington, Bedford (part; also 6th), Belmont, Cambridge (part; also 7th), Framingham, Lexington, Lincoln, Malden, Maynard, Medford, Melrose, Natick, Stoneham, Sudbury, Waltham, Watertown, Wayland, Weston, Winchester, Woburn

Norfolk County (1)

Wellesley (part; also 4th)

Suffolk County (2)

Revere, Winthrop

=== Past ===
From 2013 through 2023, the municipalities of the 5th District were:

==== Middlesex County ====
- Arlington
- Ashland
- Belmont
- Cambridge (parts of)
- Framingham
- Holliston
- Lexington
- Lincoln
- Malden
- Medford
- Melrose
- Natick
- Sherborn
- Stoneham
- Sudbury (parts of)
- Waltham
- Watertown
- Wayland
- Weston
- Winchester
- Woburn

==== Other ====
- Revere, Suffolk County
- Southborough, Worcester County
- Winthrop, Suffolk County

== Recent election results from statewide races ==
Year	Office	Results
2008	President	Obama 67% - 32%
2008	Senate	Kerry 72% - 28%
2010	Senate (Spec.)	Coakley 56% - 44%
2010	Governor	Patrick 54% - 38%
2012	President	Obama 67% - 33%
2012	Senate	Warren 59% - 41%
2014	Senate	Markey 70% - 30%
2014	Governor	Coakley 53% - 43%
2016	President	Clinton 69% - 25%
2018	Senate	Warren 69% - 27%
2018	Governor	Baker 60% - 40%
2018	Secretary of the Commonwealth	Galvin 77% - 19%
2018	Attorney General	Healey 78% - 22%
2018	Treasurer and Receiver-General	Goldberg 75% - 22%
2018	Auditor	Bump 68% - 25%
2020	President	Biden 74% - 23%
2020	Senate	Markey 75% - 24%
2022	Governor	Healey 73% - 25%
2022	Secretary of the Commonwealth	Galvin 76% - 21%
2022	Attorney General	Campbell 73% - 27%
2022	Auditor	DiZoglio 63% - 31%
2024	President	Harris 71% - 26%
2024	Senate	Warren 70% - 30%

== Recent election results ==
1990 election
Party	Candidate	Votes	%	±%
Democratic	Chester G. Atkins (incumbent)	110,232	49.85	
Republican	John MacGovern	101,017	45.68	
Other		9,891	4.47	
Turnout		221,140		
Democratic hold		Swing		

1992 election
Party	Candidate	Votes	%	±%
Democratic	Marty Meehan	133,844	52.17	+2.32
Republican	Paul W. Cronin	96,206	37.50	−8.18
Independent	Mary Farinelli	19,077	7.44	+7.44
Independent	David E. Coleman	7,214	2.81	+2.81
Write-in		223	0.09	−4.38
Turnout		256,564		
Democratic hold		Swing	+2.32	

1994 election
Party	Candidate	Votes	%	±%
Democratic	Marty Meehan (incumbent)	140,725	69.83	+17.66
Republican	David E. Coleman	60,734	30.14	−7.36
Write-in		65	0.03	−0.06
Turnout		201,524		
Democratic hold		Swing	+17.66	

1996 election
Party	Candidate	Votes	%	±%
Democratic	Marty Meehan (incumbent)	183,429	99.08	+29.25
N/A	Write-in	1,708	0.92	+0.89
Turnout		185,137		
Democratic hold		Swing	+29.25	

1998 election
Party	Candidate	Votes	%	±%
Democratic	Marty Meehan (incumbent)	127,418	70.70	−28.38
Republican	David E. Coleman	52,725	29.25	+29.25
Write-in		87	0.05	−0.87
Turnout		180,230		
Democratic hold		Swing	-28.38	

2000 election
Party	Candidate	Votes	%	±%
Democratic	Marty Meehan (incumbent)	199,601	98.02	+27.32
N/A	Write-in	4,040	1.98	+1.93
Turnout		203,641		
Democratic hold		Swing	+27.32	

2002 election
Party	Candidate	Votes	%	±%
Democratic	Marty Meehan (incumbent)	122,562	60.15	−37.87
Republican	Charles McCarthy	69,337	34.03	+34.03
Libertarian	Ilana Freedman	11,729	5.76	+5.76
Write-in		149	0.07	−1.91
Turnout		203,777		
Democratic hold		Swing	-37.87	

2004 election
Party	Candidate	Votes	%	±%
Democratic	Marty Meehan (incumbent)	179,652	66.99	+6.84
Republican	Thomas Tierney	88,232	32.90	−1.13
Write-in		305	0.11	+0.04
Turnout		268,189		
Democratic hold		Swing	+6.84	

2006 election
Party	Candidate	Votes	%	±%
Democratic	Marty Meehan (incumbent)	159,120	98.98	+31.99
N/A	Write-in	3,152	1.02	+0.91
Turnout		216,832		
Democratic hold		Swing	+31.99	

2007 Special election, 2007
Party	Candidate	Votes	%	±%
Democratic	Niki Tsongas	54,363	51.32	−47.66
Republican	Jim Ogonowski	47,770	45.10	+45.10
Independent	Patrick Murphy	2,170	2.05	+2.05
Independent	Kurt Hayes	1,125	1.06	+1.06
Constitution	Kevin Thompson	494	0.47	+0.47
Turnout		105,922		
Democratic hold		Swing	-47.66	

2008 election
Party	Candidate	Votes	%	±%
Democratic	Niki Tsongas (incumbent)	225,947	98.71	+37.39
N/A	Write-in	2,960	1.29	−2.29
Turnout		302,397		
Democratic hold		Swing	+37.39	

2010 election
Party	Candidate	Votes	%	±%
Democratic	Niki Tsongas (incumbent)	122,858	54.84	−43.87
Republican	Jonathan A. Golnik	94,646	42.25	+42.25
Independent	Dale E. Brown	4,387	1.96	+1.96
Independent	Robert M. Clark	1,991	0.89	+0.89
All Others		147	0.07	−1.22
Turnout		229,647		
Democratic hold		Swing	-43.87	

2012 election
Party	Candidate	Votes	%
Democratic	Ed Markey (incumbent)	257,490	75.5
Republican	Tom Tierney	82,944	24.3
n/a	Write-ins	675	0.2
Total votes		341,109	100.0
Democratic hold			

2014 election
Party	Candidate	Votes	%
Democratic	Katherine Clark (incumbent)	182,100	98.3
N/A	Write-ins	3,159	1.7
Total votes		185,259	100.0
Democratic hold			

2016 election
Party	Candidate	Votes	%
Democratic	Katherine Clark (Incumbent)	285,606	98.6
n/a	Write-ins	4,201	1.4
Total votes		289,807	100.0
Democratic hold			

2018 election
Party	Candidate	Votes	%
Democratic	Katherine Clark (incumbent)	236,243	75.9
Republican	John Hugo	74,856	24.0
Write-in		225	0.1
Total votes		311,324	100.0
Democratic hold			

2020 election
Party	Candidate	Votes	%
Democratic	Katherine Clark (incumbent)	294,427	74.3
Republican	Caroline Colarusso	101,351	25.6
Write-in		405	0.1
Total votes		396,183	100.0
Democratic hold			

2022 election
Party	Candidate	Votes	%
Democratic	Katherine Clark (incumbent)	203,994	74.0
Republican	Caroline Colarusso	71,491	25.9
Write-in		186	0.1
Total votes		284,881	100.0
Democratic hold			

=== 2024 ===
2024 Massachusetts's 5th congressional district election
Party	Candidate	Votes	%
Democratic	Katherine Clark (incumbent)	286,689	98.2
Write-in		5,201	1.8
Total votes		291,890	100.0
Democratic hold			

== List of members representing the district ==
Member (District home)	Party	Years ↑	Cong ress	Electoral history	District location
District created March 4, 1789
George Partridge (Duxbury)	Pro-Administration	March 4, 1789 – August 14, 1790	1st	Elected in 1788. Resigned.	1789–1793; Barnstable County and Plymouth County
Vacant		August 15, 1790 – March 3, 1791	1st		1789–1793; Barnstable County and Plymouth County
Shearjashub Bourne (Boston)	Pro-Administration	March 4, 1791 – March 3, 1793	2nd	Elected in 1790. Redistricted to the 3rd district.	1789–1793; Barnstable County and Plymouth County
District inactive		March 4, 1793 – March 3, 1795	3rd		
Nathaniel Freeman Jr. (Sandwich)	Democratic-Republican	March 4, 1795 – March 3, 1799	4th 5th	Elected in 1794. Re-elected in 1796. Retired.	1795–1803 "1st Southern district"
Lemuel Williams (New Bedford)	Federalist	March 4, 1799 – March 3, 1803	6th 7th	Elected in 1799. Re-elected in 1800. Redistricted to the 8th district.	1795–1803 "1st Southern district"
Thomas Dwight (Springfield)	Federalist	March 4, 1803 – March 3, 1805	8th	Elected in 1802. Retired.	1803–1823 "Hampshire South district"
William Ely (Springfield)	Federalist	March 4, 1805 – March 3, 1815	9th 10th 11th 12th 13th	Elected in 1804. Re-elected in 1806. Re-elected in 1808. Re-elected in 1810. Re-elected in 1812. Retired.	1803–1823 "Hampshire South district"
Elijah H. Mills (Northampton)	Federalist	March 4, 1815 – March 3, 1819	14th 15th	Elected in 1814. Re-elected in 1816. Lost re-election.	1803–1823 "Hampshire South district"
Samuel Lathrop (West Springfield)	Federalist	March 4, 1819 – March 3, 1823	16th 17th	Elected in 1819 on the second ballot. Re-elected in 1820. Redistricted to the 8th district.	1803–1823 "Hampshire South district"
Jonas Sibley (Worcester)	Democratic-Republican	March 4, 1823 – March 3, 1825	18th	Elected in 1823 on the second ballot. Lost re-election.	1823–1833 "Worcester South district"
John Davis (Worcester)	Anti-Jacksonian	March 4, 1825 – January 14, 1834	19th 20th 21st 22nd 23rd	Elected in 1825. Re-elected in 1826. Re-elected in 1828. Re-elected in 1830. Re-elected in 1833. Resigned to become Governor of Massachusetts.	1823–1833 "Worcester South district"
John Davis (Worcester)	Anti-Jacksonian	March 4, 1825 – January 14, 1834	19th 20th 21st 22nd 23rd	Elected in 1825. Re-elected in 1826. Re-elected in 1828. Re-elected in 1830. Re-elected in 1833. Resigned to become Governor of Massachusetts.	1833–1843 [data missing]
Vacant		January 15, 1834 – February 16, 1834	23rd		1833–1843 [data missing]
Levi Lincoln Jr. (Worcester)	Anti-Jacksonian	February 17, 1834 – March 3, 1837	23rd 24th 25th 26th	Elected to finish Davis's term. Re-elected later in 1834. Re-elected in 1836. Re-elected in 1838. Re-elected in 1840. Resigned to become Collector of the Port of Boston.	1833–1843 [data missing]
Levi Lincoln Jr. (Worcester)	Whig	March 4, 1837 – March 16, 1841	23rd 24th 25th 26th	Elected to finish Davis's term. Re-elected later in 1834. Re-elected in 1836. Re-elected in 1838. Re-elected in 1840. Resigned to become Collector of the Port of Boston.	1833–1843 [data missing]
Vacant		March 17, 1841 – May 2, 1841	27th		1833–1843 [data missing]
Charles Hudson (Westminster)	Whig	May 3, 1841 – March 3, 1849	27th 28th 29th 30th	Elected to finish Lincoln's term. Re-elected late in 1843. Re-elected in 1844. Re-elected in 1846. Lost re-election.	1833–1843 [data missing]
Charles Hudson (Westminster)	Whig	May 3, 1841 – March 3, 1849	27th 28th 29th 30th	Elected to finish Lincoln's term. Re-elected late in 1843. Re-elected in 1844. Re-elected in 1846. Lost re-election.	1843–1853 [data missing]
Charles Allen (Worcester)	Free Soil	March 4, 1849 – March 3, 1853	31st 32nd	Elected late in 1849. Re-elected late in 1851. Retired.	1843–1853 [data missing]
William Appleton (Boston)	Whig	March 4, 1853 – March 3, 1855	33rd	Redistricted from the 1st district and re-elected in 1852. Lost re-election.	1853–1863 [data missing]
Anson Burlingame (Cambridge)	American	March 4, 1855 – March 3, 1857	34th 35th 36th	Elected in 1854. Re-elected in 1856. Re-elected in 1858. Lost re-election.	1853–1863 [data missing]
Anson Burlingame (Cambridge)	Republican	March 4, 1857 – March 3, 1861	34th 35th 36th	Elected in 1854. Re-elected in 1856. Re-elected in 1858. Lost re-election.	1853–1863 [data missing]
William Appleton (Boston)	Constitutional Unionist	March 4, 1861 – September 27, 1861	37th	Elected in 1860. Resigned because of failing health.	1853–1863 [data missing]
Vacant		September 28, 1861 – December 1, 1861	37th		1853–1863 [data missing]
Samuel Hooper (Boston)	Republican	December 2, 1861 – March 3, 1863	37th	Elected to finish Appleton's term. Redistricted to the 4th district.	1853–1863 [data missing]
John B. Alley (Lynn)	Republican	March 4, 1863 – March 3, 1867	38th 39th	Redistricted from the 6th district and re-elected in 1862. Re-elected in 1864. [data missing]	1863–1873 [data missing]
Benjamin F. Butler (Lowell)	Republican	March 4, 1867 – March 3, 1873	40th 41st 42nd	Elected in 1866. Re-elected in 1868. Re-elected in 1870. Redistricted to the 6th district.	1863–1873 [data missing]
Daniel W. Gooch (Melrose)	Republican	March 4, 1873 – March 3, 1875	43rd	Elected in 1872. Lost re-election.	1873–1883 [data missing]
Nathaniel P. Banks (Waltham)	Independent	March 4, 1875 – March 3, 1877	44th 45th	Elected in 1874. Re-elected in 1876. Lost renomination.	1873–1883 [data missing]
Nathaniel P. Banks (Waltham)	Republican	March 4, 1877 – March 3, 1879	44th 45th	Elected in 1874. Re-elected in 1876. Lost renomination.	1873–1883 [data missing]
Selwyn Z. Bowman (Somerville)	Republican	March 4, 1879 – March 3, 1883	46th 47th	Elected in 1878. Re-elected in 1880. Lost re-election.	1873–1883 [data missing]
Leopold Morse (Boston)	Democratic	March 4, 1883 – March 3, 1885	48th	Redistricted from the 4th district and re-elected in 1882. Retired.	1883–1893 [data missing]
Edward D. Hayden (Woburn)	Republican	March 4, 1885 – March 3, 1889	49th 50th	Elected in 1884. Re-elected in 1886. Retired.	1883–1893 [data missing]
Nathaniel P. Banks (Waltham)	Republican	March 4, 1889 – March 3, 1891	51st	Elected in 1888. Retired.	1883–1893 [data missing]
Sherman Hoar (Waltham)	Democratic	March 4, 1891 – March 3, 1893	52nd	Elected in 1890. Declined renomination.	1883–1893 [data missing]
Moses T. Stevens (North Andover)	Democratic	March 4, 1893 – March 3, 1895	53rd	Redistricted from the 8th district and re-elected in 1892. [data missing]	1893–1903 [data missing]
William S. Knox (Lawrence)	Republican	March 4, 1895 – March 3, 1903	54th 55th 56th 57th	Elected in 1894. Re-elected in 1896. Re-elected in 1898. Re-elected in 1900. Retired.	1893–1903 [data missing]
Butler Ames (Lowell)	Republican	March 4, 1903 – March 3, 1913	58th 59th 60th 61st 62nd	Elected in 1902. Re-elected in 1904. Re-elected in 1906. Re-elected in 1908. Re-elected in 1910. Retired.	1903–1913 [data missing]
John Jacob Rogers (Lowell)	Republican	March 4, 1913 – March 28, 1925	63rd 64th 65th 66th 67th 68th 69th	Elected in 1912. Re-elected in 1914. Re-elected in 1916. Re-elected in 1918. Re-elected in 1920. Re-elected in 1922. Re-elected in 1924. Died.	1913–1933 [data missing]
Vacant		March 28, 1925 – June 30, 1925	69th		1913–1933 [data missing]
Edith Nourse Rogers (Lowell)	Republican	June 30, 1925 – September 10, 1960	69th 70th 71st 72nd 73rd 74th 75th 76th 77th 78th 79th 80th 81st 82nd 83rd 84th 85th 86th	Elected to finish her husband's term. Re-elected in 1926. Re-elected in 1928. Re-elected in 1930. Re-elected in 1932. Re-elected in 1934. Re-elected in 1936. Re-elected in 1938. Re-elected in 1940. Re-elected in 1942. Re-elected in 1944. Re-elected in 1946. Re-elected in 1948. Re-elected in 1950. Re-elected in 1952. Re-elected in 1954. Re-elected in 1956. Re-elected in 1958. Died.	1913–1933 [data missing]
Edith Nourse Rogers (Lowell)	Republican	June 30, 1925 – September 10, 1960	69th 70th 71st 72nd 73rd 74th 75th 76th 77th 78th 79th 80th 81st 82nd 83rd 84th 85th 86th	Elected to finish her husband's term. Re-elected in 1926. Re-elected in 1928. Re-elected in 1930. Re-elected in 1932. Re-elected in 1934. Re-elected in 1936. Re-elected in 1938. Re-elected in 1940. Re-elected in 1942. Re-elected in 1944. Re-elected in 1946. Re-elected in 1948. Re-elected in 1950. Re-elected in 1952. Re-elected in 1954. Re-elected in 1956. Re-elected in 1958. Died.	1933–1943 [data missing]
Edith Nourse Rogers (Lowell)	Republican	June 30, 1925 – September 10, 1960	69th 70th 71st 72nd 73rd 74th 75th 76th 77th 78th 79th 80th 81st 82nd 83rd 84th 85th 86th	Elected to finish her husband's term. Re-elected in 1926. Re-elected in 1928. Re-elected in 1930. Re-elected in 1932. Re-elected in 1934. Re-elected in 1936. Re-elected in 1938. Re-elected in 1940. Re-elected in 1942. Re-elected in 1944. Re-elected in 1946. Re-elected in 1948. Re-elected in 1950. Re-elected in 1952. Re-elected in 1954. Re-elected in 1956. Re-elected in 1958. Died.	1943–1953 [data missing]
Edith Nourse Rogers (Lowell)	Republican	June 30, 1925 – September 10, 1960	69th 70th 71st 72nd 73rd 74th 75th 76th 77th 78th 79th 80th 81st 82nd 83rd 84th 85th 86th	Elected to finish her husband's term. Re-elected in 1926. Re-elected in 1928. Re-elected in 1930. Re-elected in 1932. Re-elected in 1934. Re-elected in 1936. Re-elected in 1938. Re-elected in 1940. Re-elected in 1942. Re-elected in 1944. Re-elected in 1946. Re-elected in 1948. Re-elected in 1950. Re-elected in 1952. Re-elected in 1954. Re-elected in 1956. Re-elected in 1958. Died.	1953–1963 [data missing]
Vacant		September 10, 1960 – January 3, 1961	86th		1953–1963 [data missing]
F. Bradford Morse (Lowell)	Republican	January 3, 1961 – May 1, 1972	87th 88th 89th 90th 91st 92nd	Elected in 1960. Re-elected in 1962. Re-elected in 1964. Re-elected in 1966. Re-elected in 1968. Re-elected in 1970. Resigned to become U.N. Under Secretary General for Political and General Assembly Affairs.	1953–1963 [data missing]
F. Bradford Morse (Lowell)	Republican	January 3, 1961 – May 1, 1972	87th 88th 89th 90th 91st 92nd	Elected in 1960. Re-elected in 1962. Re-elected in 1964. Re-elected in 1966. Re-elected in 1968. Re-elected in 1970. Resigned to become U.N. Under Secretary General for Political and General Assembly Affairs.	1963–1973 [data missing]
Vacant		May 1, 1972 – January 3, 1973	92nd		1963–1973 [data missing]
Paul W. Cronin (Andover)	Republican	January 3, 1973 – January 3, 1975	93rd	Elected in 1972. Lost re-election.	1973–1983 [data missing]
Paul Tsongas (Lowell)	Democratic	January 3, 1975 – January 3, 1979	94th 95th	Elected in 1974. Re-elected in 1976. Retired to run for U.S. senator.	1973–1983 [data missing]
James Shannon (Lawrence)	Democratic	January 3, 1979 – January 3, 1983	96th 97th 98th	Elected in 1978. Re-elected in 1980. Re-elected in 1982. Retired to run for U.S. senator.	1973–1983 [data missing]
James Shannon (Lawrence)	Democratic	January 3, 1983 – January 3, 1985	96th 97th 98th	Elected in 1978. Re-elected in 1980. Re-elected in 1982. Retired to run for U.S. senator.	1983–1993 [data missing]
Chester G. Atkins (Concord)	Democratic	January 3, 1985 – January 3, 1993	99th 100th 101st 102nd	Re-elected in 1984. Re-elected in 1986. Re-elected in 1988. Re-elected in 1990. Lost renomination.	1983–1993 [data missing]
Marty Meehan (Lowell)	Democratic	January 3, 1993 – July 1, 2007	103rd 104th 105th 106th 107th 108th 109th 110th	Elected in 1992. Re-elected in 1994. Re-elected in 1996. Re-elected in 1998. Re-elected in 2000. Re-elected in 2002. Re-elected in 2004. Re-elected in 2006. Resigned to become Chancellor of University of Massachusetts Lowell.	1993–2003 [data missing]
Marty Meehan (Lowell)	Democratic	January 3, 1993 – July 1, 2007	103rd 104th 105th 106th 107th 108th 109th 110th	Elected in 1992. Re-elected in 1994. Re-elected in 1996. Re-elected in 1998. Re-elected in 2000. Re-elected in 2002. Re-elected in 2004. Re-elected in 2006. Resigned to become Chancellor of University of Massachusetts Lowell.	2003–2013 [data missing]
Vacant		July 1, 2007 – October 16, 2007	110th		2003–2013 [data missing]
Niki Tsongas (Lowell)	Democratic	October 16, 2007 – January 3, 2013	110th 111th 112th	Elected to finish Meehan's term. Re-elected in 2008. Re-elected in 2010. Redistricted to the 3rd district.	2003–2013 [data missing]
Ed Markey (Malden)	Democratic	January 3, 2013 – July 15, 2013	113th	Redistricted from the 7th district and re-elected in 2012. Resigned when elected U.S. senator.	2013–2023
Vacant		July 15, 2013 – December 10, 2013	113th		2013–2023
Katherine Clark (Revere)	Democratic	December 10, 2013 – present	113th 114th 115th 116th 117th 118th 119th	Elected to finish Markey's term. Re-elected in 2014. Re-elected in 2016. Re-elected in 2018. Re-elected in 2020. Re-elected in 2022. Re-elected in 2024. Re-elected in 2026.	2013–2023
Katherine Clark (Revere)	Democratic	December 10, 2013 – present	113th 114th 115th 116th 117th 118th 119th	Elected to finish Markey's term. Re-elected in 2014. Re-elected in 2016. Re-elected in 2018. Re-elected in 2020. Re-elected in 2022. Re-elected in 2024. Re-elected in 2026.	2023–present
