= Selwyn Z. Bowman =

American attorney and politician (1840–1928)

Selwyn Zadock Bowman
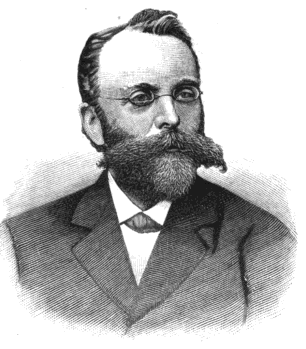

Member of the U.S. House of Representatives from Massachusetts's 5th district
- In office March 4, 1879 – March 3, 1883
- Preceded by: Nathaniel P. Banks
- Succeeded by: Leopold Morse

Member of the Massachusetts House of Representatives
- In office 1870–1871; 1875

Member of the Massachusetts Senate
- In office 1876–1877

Personal details
- Born: May 11, 1840 Charlestown, Massachusetts, U.S.
- Died: September 30, 1928 (aged 88) Framingham, Massachusetts, U.S.
- Resting place: Mount Auburn Cemetery
- Party: Republican
- Spouse: Martha Emily Tufts
- Children: Mabel E. Bowman, Ethel Bowman
- Education: Harvard College, 1860; Harvard Law School, 1863
- Profession: Attorney

Selwyn Zadock Bowman (May 11, 1840 – September 30, 1928) was an American attorney and politician who served in several public offices, including that of the U.S. representative from Massachusetts.

Bowman was born in Charlestown, Massachusetts, to Zadock and Rosetta (Crane) Bowman. He attended the Charlestown public schools and Charlestown High School. He moved to Somerville, Massachusetts, with his parents in 1856.

He graduated from Harvard University in 1860 and from its law school in 1863. He was admitted to the bar in 1863, commenced practice in Boston, Massachusetts, and continued his residence in Somerville.

He served as a member of the State House of Representatives in 1870, 1871, and again in 1875. He served as city solicitor of Somerville, Massachusetts, in 1872 and 1873. He served in the state senate in 1876 and 1877.

Bowman was elected as a Republican to the forty-sixth and forty-seventh Congresses (March 4, 1879 – March 3, 1883). He was an unsuccessful candidate for reelection in 1882 to the Forty-eighth Congress.

He returned to Somerville and resumed the practice of law in Boston. He again served as city solicitor for Somerville from 1888 to 1897. He moved to Cohasset in 1914 and continued the practice of law in Boston.

Bowman died in Framingham, Massachusetts, on September 30, 1928. He was interred in Mount Auburn Cemetery in Cambridge.

== See also ==
- 1875 Massachusetts legislature
- 1876 Massachusetts legislature
- 1877 Massachusetts legislature

U.S. House of Representatives
Preceded by Nathaniel P. Banks	Member of the U.S. House of Representatives from Massachusetts's 5th congressional district March 4, 1879 – March 3, 1883	Succeeded by Leopold Morse
