= Whiting Griswold =

American politician

Member of the Massachusetts Constitutional Convention of 1853
- In office 1853–1853

Member of the Massachusetts Senate
- In office 1851–1852

Member of the Massachusetts House of Representatives
- In office 1848–1850

Personal details
- Born: November 12, 1814 Buckland, Massachusetts
- Died: October 28, 1874 (aged 59) Greenfield, Massachusetts
- Party: Democrat, Free Soil
- Spouse: Fannie L. Clark
- Children: Freeman Clark Griswold
- Education: Amherst College, 1838
- Profession: Attorney

Whiting Griswold (November 12, 1814 – October 28, 1874) was an American abolitionist, lawyer and politician who served as a member of the Massachusetts House of Representatives and in the Massachusetts Senate. In 1864 Griswold was a presidential elector from Massachusetts for Abraham Lincoln.

== Career ==
In 1842 Griswold was admitted to the Massachusetts Bar at Northampton, Massachusetts.

== See also ==
- 1869 Massachusetts legislature
