= Massachusetts Constitutional Convention of 1853 =

Third constitutional convention of Massachusetts, USA

The Massachusetts Constitutional Convention of 1853 met from May 4 to August 2 in order to consider changes to the Massachusetts Constitution. This was the third such convention in Massachusetts history, following the original constitutional convention, in 1779–80 and the second, in 1820–21, which resulted in the adoption of the first nine amendments.

The 1853 convention was dominated by the waning Democratic-Free Soil coalition and proposed an entirely new constitution and seven separate provisions, which could be passed with or without the core constitution. The primary point of contention was the reallocation of political representation in the state; the coalition proposed a maintenance of the town representative system, while the Whigs proposed a proportional representation system that would be dominated by the cities. Every proposal was rejected narrowly by popular referendum, although a number of individual ideas arising from the convention were later adopted by individual amendment processes.

Since 1853, Massachusetts has had one subsequent constitutional convention, in 1917–1918.

== Background ==
=== Social changes ===
Since 1820, the date of the prior constitutional convention, Massachusetts had undergone radical industrialization. The establishment of the first textile mills in the United States at Waltham and Lowell had altered the state's social and political character, creating dense (by the standards of the day) urban centers.

=== Failed 1851 attempt to call a convention ===
Democrat George S. Boutwell was elected Governor of Massachusetts in January 1851 by a coalition of Democratic Party and Free Soil Party voters and legislators. The coalition government marked the apex of a determined drive against the Whig hegemony which had dominated the Second Party System in Massachusetts. A joint committee of the Massachusetts General Court recommended an amendment giving smaller towns a representative advantage over cities, which were typically Whig-dominated, but it failed to reach the required two-thirds majority in the House of Representatives. However, the drive for reform persisted, and a Senate bill put the question of a constitutional convention to a popular vote. The bill passed, but on November 10, 1851, the idea of a convention was rejected by a vote of 65,846 against to 60,972 in favor.

=== Successful 1852 call ===
Undeterred, on May 7, 1852, the General Court passed "An Act relating to the calling a Convention of Delegates of the People, for the purpose of revising the Constitution". On November 8 of that year, the following question was answered in the affirmative by the voters:

Is it expedient that delegates should be chosen to meet in convention for the purpose of revising or altering the Constitution of government of this Commonwealth?

=== Delegates ===
==== Election ====
Delegates were elected on March 7, 1853. Each town was entitled to a number of delegates equal to its number of representatives in the state House. Each town was eligible to elect at least one delegate, and all but eight did so. The apportionment favored the towns over cities. The Commonwealth's 139 smallest towns, with an average population of 1,000, elected 139 delegates; the ten largest cities, with an average population of 29,500, elected only 93.

In the delegate elections, the coalition played to its strengths, stumping the interior on a promise that a vote for coalition delegates would ensure increased power in the state legislature.

==== Composition ====
419 delegates were elected in total. Around one third of the delegates were farmers, by far the largest socioeconomic group present. Another third were made up of lawyers, merchants, and traders. The remainder were mostly small businessmen, professionals, and small-town artisans. Only one of ten came from the working class. Over half of the delegates had experience in the legislature. Historian John Mulkern described the convention as Locofocoist, combining a "progressive antimonopoly and populist spirit" with a "retrogressive anti-city bias."

Only one delegate was an Irish Catholic. Every delegate was male.

Notable delegates included:

- Nathaniel P. Banks
- Lyman Beecher
- Francis W. Bird
- Benjamin Butler
- Rufus Choate
- Richard Henry Dana Jr.
- Whiting Griswold
- Nathan Hale
- Benjamin F. Hallett
- Giles Crouch Kellogg
- Edward L. Keyes
- William Schouler
- Charles Sumner
- Ezra W. Wilkinson
- Henry Wilson

== Convention ==
The Constitutional Convention met at noon on Wednesday, May 4, 1853, at the State House in Boston. There is no record of any oath having been used to swear in the members.

Generally, less than the full 419 delegates were in attendance. For instance, on a vote taken July 28, only 165 members—less than half the full body—were present and voting.

After 72 days of work, it adjourned sine die on Tuesday, August 2, 1853, at 1:54 am. The convention submitted eight proposals to popular vote. The Committee on the Pay Roll reported an expense figure of $114,092 for the convention.

=== Organization ===
On the first day of the convention, Democrat Nathaniel P. Banks was elected president over Whig George N. Briggs, 250–137, with four others winning one vote each.

Also on the convention's opening day, one man from each county was selected in order to sit on a committee to establish how best to proceed. They reported back two days later with a recommendation of standing committees. These were as follows:

1. Standing Committee on so much of the Constitution as is contained in the Preamble and Declaration of Rights. (13 members)
2. Standing Committee on so much of the Constitution as relates to the Frame of Government, Elections by the Legislature, &c. (13 members)
3. Standing Committee on so much of the Constitution as relates to the Senate. (21 members)
4. Standing Committee on so much of the Constitution as relates to the House of Representatives. (21 members)
5. Standing Committee on so much of the Constitution as relates to the Governor, &c. (13 members)
6. Standing Committee on so much of the Constitution as relates to the Militia, &c. (13 members)
7. Standing Committee on so much of the Constitution as relates to the Lieutenant-Governor, &c. (13 members)
8. Standing Committee on so much of the Constitution as relates to the council, &c. (13 members)
9. Standing Committee on so much of the Constitution as relates to the Secretary and Treasurer, and the Attorney-General, Solicitor-General, Sheriffs, Coroners, Registers of Probate, and Notaries Public, &c. (13 members)
10. Standing Committee on so much of the Constitution as relates to the Judiciary, &c. (13 members)
11. Standing Committee on so much of the Constitution as relates to the University at Cambridge, &c. (13 members)
12. Standing Committee on so much of the Constitution as relates to the Encouragement of Literature. (13 members)
13. Standing Committee on so much of the Constitution as relates to Oaths and Subscriptions, Incompatibility and Exclusion from Office, Pecuniary Qualifications, &c. (13 members)
14. Standing Committee on so much of the Constitution as relates to the Qualification of Voters, &c. (13 members)
15. Standing Committee on so much of the Constitution as relates to Amendments and Enrolment. (13 members)

Fifteen ministers were in attendance; on the second day of the convention, Rev. Warren Burton was elected chaplain from among these. Of 385 votes cast, he received 224, with Lyman Beecher garnering 129, James D. Farnsworth 17, and the rest one or two votes apiece.

Additionally, during the course of its business, the convention found it expedient to organize Committees on Vacancies; the Adoption of the Principle of Plurality in Elections; the Loan and Credit of the State; Banking Corporations; General Corporations; and on the Order of Business. Finally, although the legislature had abandoned this device some years previous, the convention met several times as a committee of the whole; this allowed it to circumvent some of the cumbersome rules of procedure normally used and to quickly gauge the support of a particular measure. As for petitions, they "could be presented to the Convention only on introduction by a delegate."

=== Debates ===
The debates notably saw the Whigs adopt a strategy of constitutional reform, a reversal from their historical record of conservative retrenchment. Free Soiler Francis W. Bird remarked, "I thought I came here as one of the progressive in company with a majority of this Convention, but I find that we have all turned to the 'right-about-face.' The conservatives are on the engine, and the radicals are on the brake."

==== Labor ====
The convention was essentially silent on labor, despite growing concerns by and about the new urban industrial population. Despite their salience in recent elections, hours, wages, working conditions, arbitrary contracts, and exploitation of children and women were unaddressed. None of the delegates acknowledged industrial workers, the largest socioeconomic group in the state, as a novel or separate interest group from the general working classes. The coalition push for a secret ballot, which would circumvent the political domination of workers by their managers, was the lone substantive labor issue mentioned.

==== Elections ====
Historically, Whigs had promoted the electoral majority rule system. No candidates for legislative office could win without a majority of the vote; if none received one, run-offs were held until one candidate did. This tended to favor wealthy interests, because working men could not take multiple days off of work to vote. Additionally, the thus-conservative General Court elected the governor if no candidate received a majority, which tended to favor the large Whig plurality. However, the victories of the coalition forces in 1850 and 1851, made possible by the combined majority of their parties, provoked an about-face from the Whig delegates; they now argued for plurality rule, under which Whig dominance would be assured.

The Whigs also reversed their historical opposition to popular election of executive officers, elimination of the general ticket, and elimination of the poll tax.

==== Representation ====
The primary issue at the convention was the problem of representation, which had been an issue with the constitution since its adoption in 1780. The coalition, led by Henry Wilson, hoped to preserve the town system of representation which had advantaged rural agrarian interests over the urban mercantile Whigs, while the Whig minority argued for proportional representation in both the Senate and House. The floor fight over representation last for nearly one month.

The resulting coalition proposals were reactionary in contrast to the otherwise egalitarian, democratic constitution. To this end, the committee on representation, chaired by Whiting Griswold of rural Franklin County, proposed a system by which less than one third of the electorate would choose a majority of Representatives. The Griswold plan was not straightforwardly a shift towards rural populations, but towns in particular. Under the plan, the rural (but staunchly Whig) maritime communities of Cape Cod, Nantucket, and Martha's Vineyard were underrepresented relative to agrarian Western Massachusetts, which had fewer people but more small towns.

Coalitionists argued that country towns had a "manifest difference" from urban life, appealing to history and morality. Free Soilers in particular stressed nativism, arguing that the disproportionate population of Massachusetts cities was in part due to massive waves of immigration. Even Bostonian Benjamin F. Hallett argued that cities "have great sores in them, which do not exist in the country."

Whigs, led by Rufus Choate, staked their argument on the principle of one man, one vote, which would entrench power in the Whig stronghold of Boston and eastern Massachusetts more generally. The Whig argument was straightforwardly populist, another apparent reversal from their history of conservatism. Choate and William Schouler noted that under the existing system, representation was granted by the "accident of place." Whigs readily made comparisons to the "rotten borough" system which England had already abandoned a generation earlier.

Coalition counter-arguments were largely resigned to cries of hypocrisy or the countercharge that, in the words of Francis W. Bird, "the district system ... would in a few years give the entire control of the State to the money power of Boston." On the final day of the convention, fearing that the constitution as written would not achieve popular support, Henry Wilson introduced a compromise provision that would abandon the Griswold plan and authorize the General Court to submit its own plan to popular vote after the next census. The proposal passed, though Whigs decried it as a "sham... to get votes for the Constitution."

=== Closing remarks ===
At the convention's closing session, former Governor George S. Boutwell addressed a message to the people. He noted that

As your delegates, we have sought for the principles of freedom in the ancient institutions of the State; but we have thought it wise also to accept the teachings and experience of nearly a century of independent existence. It has then been our purpose to unite in one system of organic law, the principles of American republican institutions, and the experiences of other free States, all contemplated in the light derived from the history and usages of Massachusetts

Up to that point, the Massachusetts Constitution had been amended 13 times, and some of those provisions had rendered parts of the document's original body inoperative. Boutwell asserted that "Constitutional laws should be plain, that they may be impartially interpreted and faithfully executed, 'that every man may at all times find his security in them'".

== Final proposals and vote ==
On November 11, 1853, the proposals of the Constitutional Convention were placed before the voters. Every single proposal, including the new Constitution, went down in defeat.

Proposition Number One Adopted by the convention and to be submitted to the people for a vote was a new Constitution overhauling that of 1780. Boutwell enumerated its main points:

- The Constitution of 1780 was to be preserved as the basis of a new Constitution, with changes incorporated.
- The General Court would have a 100-day session, with members' pay fixed by standing laws.
- The method of electing senators was changed. Previously, each county had elected between one and six senators; now, 40 districts of equal population were to be drawn, with one senator for each district.
- In the House of Representatives, the system of per-town representation kept, wherein each town, no matter how small, had at least one representative. Boutwell said, "We do not claim that this system, separately considered, is precisely equal; but if it is in some degree favorable to the rural districts, the loss sustained by the large towns and cities is in a fair measure compensated by the manifest advantages accorded to them in the constitution of the Council and the Senate."
- Realizing there was opposition to this, provision was made for the 1856 Legislature to present a district system to the people based on the results of the 1855 state census.
- No district could elect more than three representatives. "The election of many officers on a single general ticket, is not compatible with the freedom and purity of the representative system."
- The property requirement for Governor and Lieutenant Governor was abolished.
- The Massachusetts Governor's Council was now to be popularly elected in eight single-member districts and its records were to be made public.
- The Attorney General, Secretary of the Commonwealth, Auditor, and Treasurer, then appointed by the governor or chosen by the legislature, were to be elected annually. Judges and registers of probate, sheriffs, clerks of courts, commissioners of insolvency, and district attorneys, all appointed by the executive or the courts at the time, were to be popularly elected for 3-year terms.
- Justices of the Massachusetts Supreme Judicial Court and the Court of Common Pleas were hereafter to be appointed to 10-year terms.
- The procedure for removing judges was streamlined.
- Justices of the peace with chiefly ministerial duties were to be appointed by the governor and council; those with judicial authority were to be elected for 3-year terms.
- The property qualification for voting was entirely abolished.
- The secret ballot was enshrined in the Constitution.
- Previously, if no candidate attained a majority of votes, a subsequent runoff election would be held. Now, candidates having the highest number of votes would be deemed elected, even if this was not a majority of votes cast, in county and district elections.
- However, if candidates for Governor, Lieutenant Governor, Secretary of the Commonwealth, Attorney General, Treasurer, or Auditor failed to receive a majority, the election would (as before) be referred to the General Court. For General Court representatives and town officers, runoff elections were to be held if no majority were obtained on the first ballot. Provision was made that if the public demanded plurality voting, the legislature was authorized to introduce it.
- Provisions regarding the state militia were revised.
- Changes were proposed concerning Harvard University, which at the time received public funding: the General Court was instructed to provide means for the enlargement of the School Fund to no less than $2 million.
- Provision was made for periodical Constitutional Conventions (every 20 years) not subject to or restricted by previous or subsequent acts of the legislature.

Additionally, and this was not mentioned by Boutwell, the constitution provided that the Tuesday after the first Monday in November was to be the state election day, so as to align with the Congressional election day.

Boutwell closed by calling the adoption or revision of a constitution "an epoch in the history of a free people," stating that "We have no doubt that your decision will ... under Divine Providence, ... render more and more illustrious our ancient Commonwealth."

In addition to the new constitution, seven distinct amendments were proposed, numbered two through eight, as the constitution was number one. They were as follows:

#1 (New Constitution)
| Voted Yes | Percent Yes | Voted No | Percent No |
|---|---|---|---|
| 63,222 | 48.1 | 68,150 | 51.9 |

Proposition Number Two The writ of habeas corpus shall be granted as of right in all cases in which a discretion is not especially conferred upon the court by the legislature; but the legislature may prescribe forms of proceeding preliminary to the obtaining of the writ.

#2 (Habeas corpus broadened)
| Voted Yes | Percent Yes | Voted No | Percent No |
|---|---|---|---|
| 63,382 | 48.6 | 67,006 | 51.4 |

Proposition Number Three In all trials for criminal offenses, the jury, after having received the instruction of the court, shall have the right, in their verdict of guilty or not guilty, to determine the law and the facts of the case, but it shall be the duty of the court to superintend the course of the trials, to decide upon the admission and rejection of evidence, and upon all questions of law raised during the trials, and upon all collateral and incidental proceedings; and also to allow bills of exceptions. And the court may grant a new trial in case of conviction.

#3 (Right of Jury nullification)
| Voted Yes | Percent Yes | Voted No | Percent No |
|---|---|---|---|
| 61,699 | 47.4 | 68,382 | 52.6 |

Proposition Number Four Every person having a claim against the Commonwealth, ought to have a judicial remedy therefor.

#4 (Judicial investigations against the Commonwealth permitted)
| Voted Yes | Percent Yes | Voted No | Percent No |
|---|---|---|---|
| 63,805 | 48.9 | 66,828 | 51.1 |

Proposition Number Five No person shall be imprisoned for any debt hereafter contracted, unless in cases of fraud.

#5 (Restraints upon imprisonment of debtors increased)
| Voted Yes | Percent Yes | Voted No | Percent No |
|---|---|---|---|
| 64,015 | 49.1 | 66,432 | 50.9 |

Proposition Number Six All moneys raised by taxation in the towns and cities, for the support of public schools, and all moneys which may be appropriated by the state for the support of common schools, shall be supplied to and expended in no other schools than those which are conducted according to law, under the order and superintendence of the authorities of the town or city in which the money is to be expended; and such moneys shall never be appropriated to any religious sect, for the maintenance, exclusively, of its own schools.

#6 (State funding of religious schools prohibited)
| Voted Yes | Percent Yes | Voted No | Percent No |
|---|---|---|---|
| 65,111 | 49.85 | 65,512 | 50.15 |

Proposition Number Seven The legislature shall not create corporations by special act, when the object of the incorporation is attainable by general laws.

#7 (Businesses incorporated under general, not special, laws)
| Voted Yes | Percent Yes | Voted No | Percent No |
|---|---|---|---|
| 63,246 | 48.6 | 67,011 | 51.4 |

Proposition Number Eight The legislature shall have no power to pass any act granting any special charter for banking purposes, or any special act to increase the capital stock of any chartered bank; but corporations may be formed for such purposes, or the capital stock of chartered banks may be increased, under general laws.

The legislature shall provide by law for the registry of all notes or bills authorized by general laws to be issued or put in circulation as money; and shall require ample security for the redemption of such notes in specie.

#8 (Banks incorporated under general, not special, laws; banknotes redeemed in specie)
| Voted Yes | Percent Yes | Voted No | Percent No |
|---|---|---|---|
| 63,412 | 48.6 | 67,109 | 51.4 |

=== Analysis ===
The counties of Barnstable, Dukes, Essex, Hampshire, Middlesex, Nantucket, Norfolk, Plymouth, and Suffolk rejected every proposal. On the other hand, the counties of Berkshire, Franklin, Hampden, and Worcester voted in favor of each proposal, with support strongest in Worcester County, which approved each question by a margin of around 13,000 to 7,500. Bristol County was nearly evenly split on the questions, with proposals 1, 2, 4, 5, 7, and 8 carrying by margins of 31, 15, 74, 7, 54, and 35, respectively, while proposals 3 and 6 lost by 115 and 32 votes, respectively.

Had the convention submitted its proposed changes as individual amendments, "undoubtedly it would have proved a success," as evidenced by the adoption of most of its proposals as amendments in the coming years. The trouble was that it "did not know where to begin and where to end." On the one hand, it left the House of Representatives elected by the same method as before, and representation, since 1780 a contentious issue, "had been the real cause for the convocation of the convention." On the other hand, it took the radical step of reducing judges' terms from life to ten years for the SJC and Court of Common Pleas and three years for probate judges. This change "was too much; it brought down a veritable storm of excoriation upon the convention and its work, and resulted in the flat rejection of the whole."

== Aftermath ==
Although its ambitious proposals were all rejected, the convention's work was not for nothing: a series of constitutional amendments passed over the next few years incorporated many of the same changes into the Constitution.

Amendments XIV through XIX have a clear "post-convention" character to them, having been adopted by the 1854 and 1855 Legislatures and approved by the people on May 23, 1855:

- Amendment XIV provided for plurality voting for all civil officers of the state, to ensure that there would be no repeat of the unsatisfactory situation where the legislature decided the 1850 gubernatorial election.
- Amendment XV provided that all state elections be held on the Tuesday after the first Monday in November, harmonizing with Federal elections.
- Amendment XVI enacted reform of the Governor's Council, now to be popularly elected in eight single-member districts.
- Amendment XVII provided for popular election of the Secretary of the Commonwealth, Treasurer, Auditor, and Attorney General.
- Amendment XVIII prohibited state funding of sectarian schools. Voted on as Proposition Number Six in 1853, this was the proposal of the Convention that came closest to passing that year, which is unsurprising given the strength of the Know Nothing movement in Massachusetts at the time.
- Amendment XIX provided for the popular election of sheriffs, registers of probate, clerks of the courts, and District Attorneys, but not judges as had been specified in the proposed constitution.

Amendments XXI and XXII also bear the stamp of the convention's influence; they were adopted by the 1856 and 1857 legislatures and approved by the people on May 1, 1857:

- Amendment XXI finally fixed the size of the House of Representatives at 240 and abolished the per-town apportionment that had been so problematic. While this was not part of the convention's package of proposals, it was the convention that "gave the people a well-defined program of construction for matters which required change";

Finally, Amendment XXXIV, adopted by the 1891 and 1892 legislatures and approved by the people on November 8, 1892, abolished the property requirement for the Governor and Lieutenant Governor.
