= Margaret Wendell Huntington =

American painter

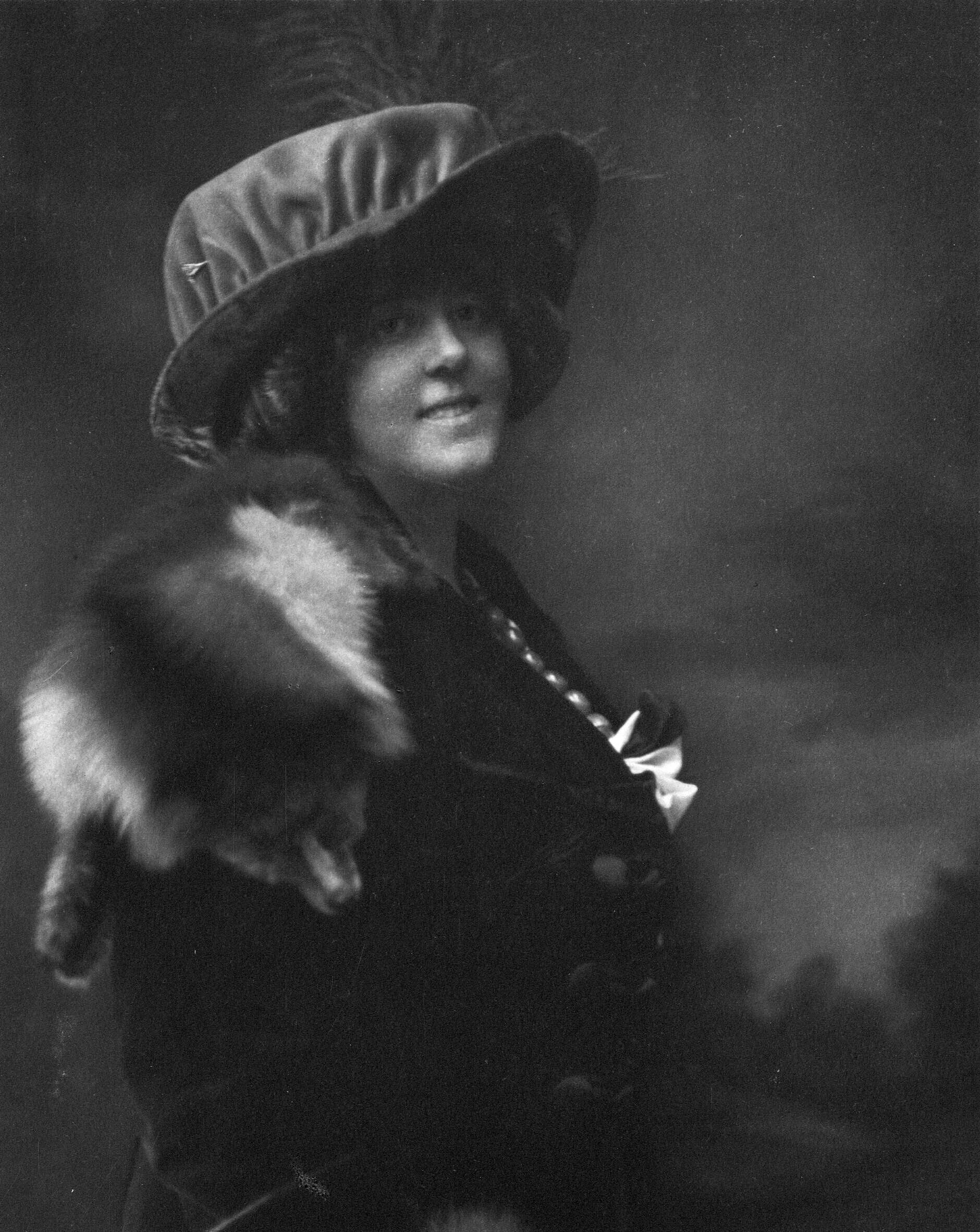
- Margaret Wendell Huntington, about 1918
- Born: July 6, 1866 [[Nahant, Massachusetts[]]
- Died: April 17, 1958 (aged 91); New York City
- Resting place: Mount Auburn Cemetery, Cambridge, Massachusetts

Margaret Wendell Huntington (July 6, 1866 – April 17, 1958) was an American artist known for realist landscapes, still lifes, and shore scenes. Critics admired her bright colors, her vigorous style, and the accurate rendering of her subjects. In a career that extended from the 1890s to the 1950s, she participated in many group and solo exhibitions in commercial and non-commercial galleries as well as museums and national expositions. She received instruction from prominent artists of the New York art community and Paris. Margaret Wendell Huntington should not be confused with another other artist of her generation, Margaret Huntington Boehner (1874–1973) whose career overlapped with hers and who lived and worked in the same geographic region. (Note: Margaret Huntington Watkeys Boehner lived and worked in Syracuse, New York, during a long career as a painter. In subject matter, style, and materials, Margaret Huntington Boehner's work was similar to Margaret Wendell Huntington's.)

== Early life and training ==
Huntington was the daughter of William Reed Huntington, a prominent Episcopal priest. She grew up in the rectory of Grace Church in Manhattan and in a summer home called "Inchcape" in Northeast Harbor on Mount Desert Island, Maine. Having decided to pursue art as a career, she studied in New York at the Art Students League under William Merritt Chase, Robert Reid, and J. Alden Weir; in Spain under Robert Henri; and in Paris under Lucien Simon.

== Career in art and critical reception ==
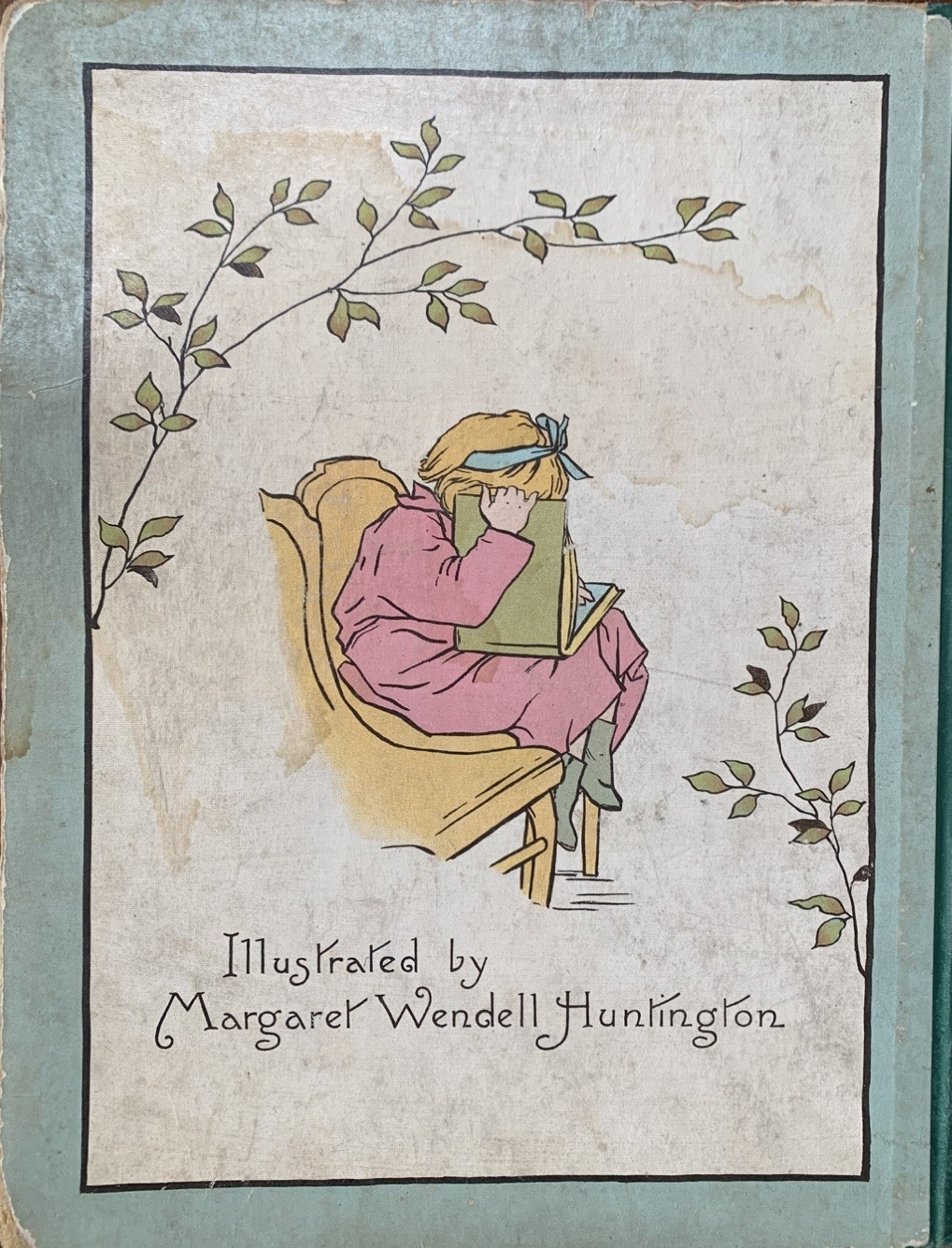
Margaret Huntington, 1894, back cover, Told in a Hammock (London, Marcus Ward & Co.)

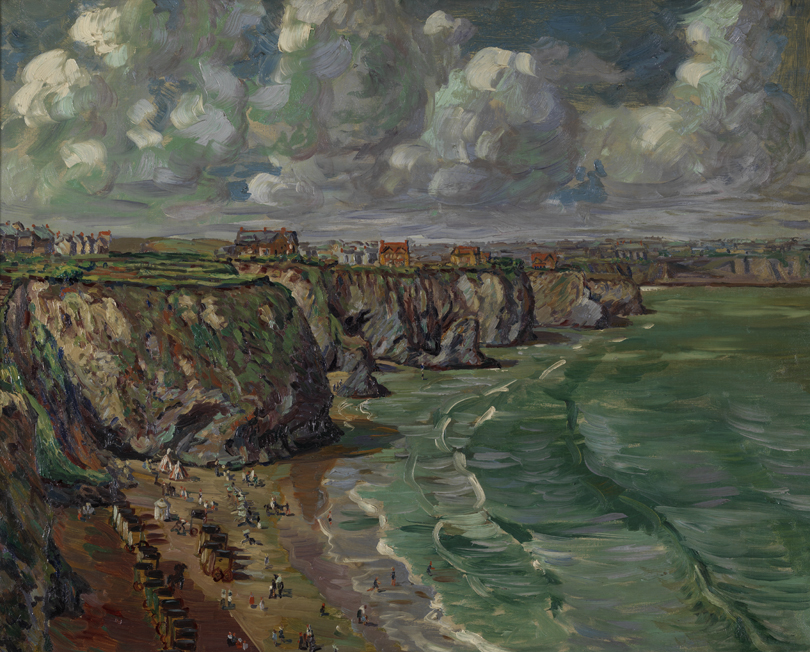
Margaret Huntington, Cornwall Cliffs, about 1918. oil on canvas, 23 15/16 x 30 inches

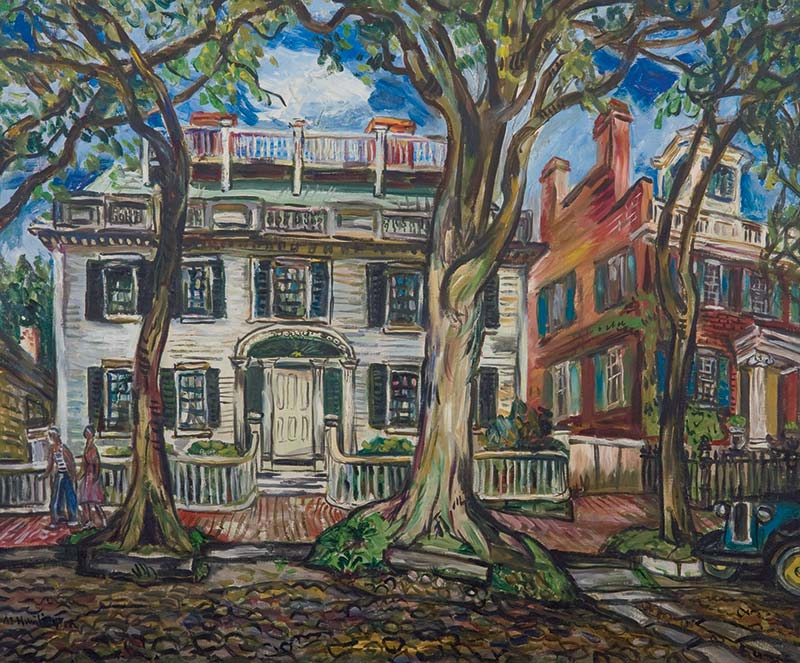
Margaret Huntington, 1932, Nantucket Houses, oil on canvas, 30 x 36 inches

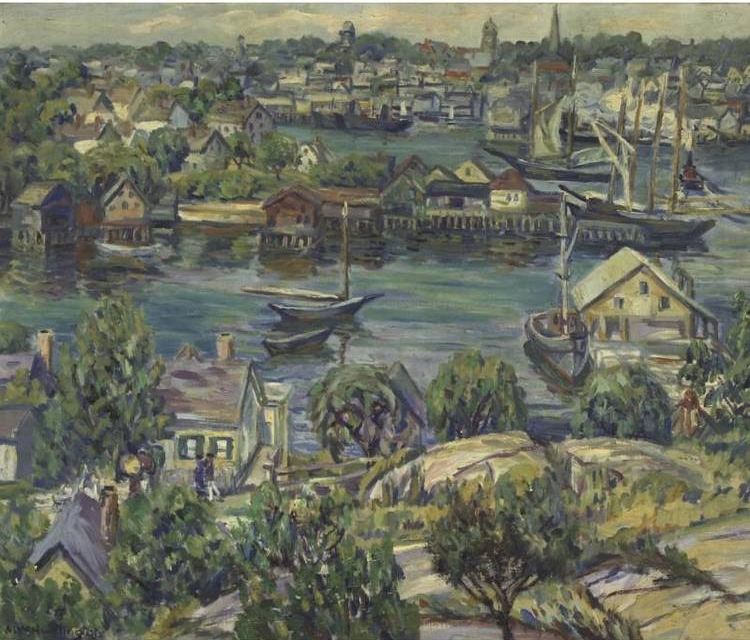
Margaret Huntington, 1932, Harbor Scene, oil on canvas, 27 x 32 inches

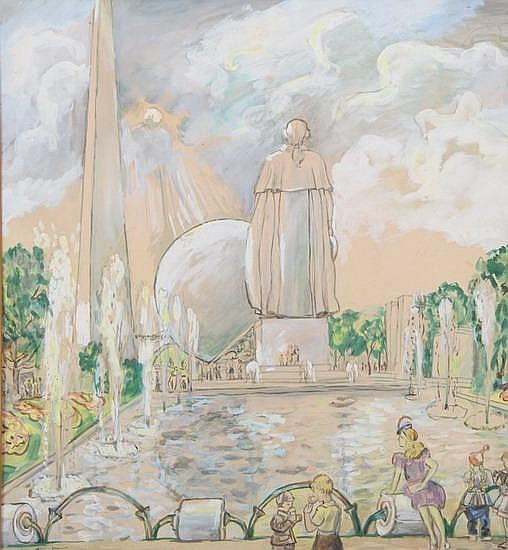
Margaret Huntington, 1939, World's Fair, watercolor and gouache on paper, 21 1/4 x 19 1/2 inches

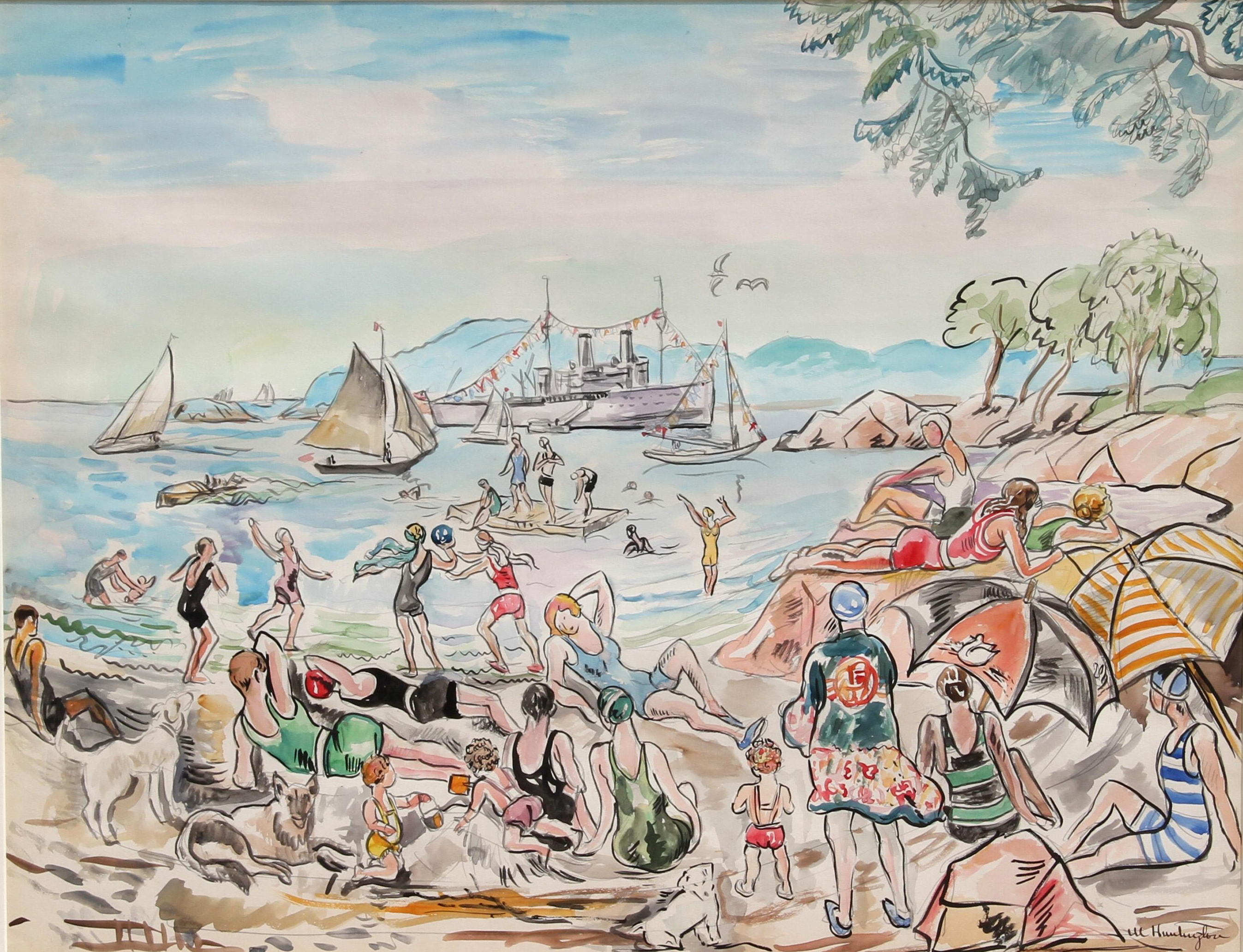
Margaret Huntington, about 1940, Beach Scene, watercolor, 22 x 28 inches

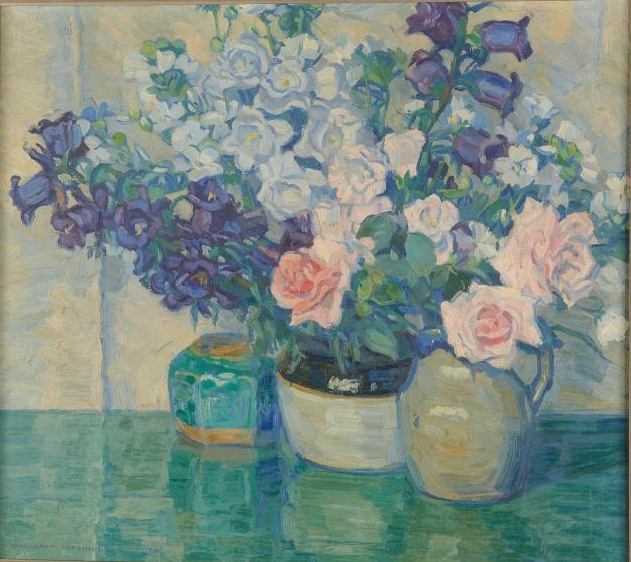
Margaret Huntington, about 1948, Flowers in a Vase, oil on canvas, 25 x 28 inches

In 1894, a London publisher issued a book of poems for young children that Huntington had written and illustrated. The book attracted little notice and proved to be the sole publication of her career. The following year, she participated in a Society of American Artists exhibition in Manhattan's Fine Arts Building. Reviewing the exhibition, a critic for the New York Press predicted that one of her paintings, called "Summer Breezes", would please viewers who had "advanced tastes" but disappoint traditionalists. Another reviewer praised two other Huntington paintings in this show, calling one "well painted" and the other "remarkable". When Huntington participated in an exhibition of bicycling posters later that year, a reviewer said her contributions were especially admirable. A few months later, the author and critic Clarence Cook discussed Huntington's paintings in an article criticizing the absence of "poetic conception" in contemporary work and chastising male artists for failing to capitalize on the advantages of their "larger opportunities and more assured position" over female artists. He praised the "breadth and decorative effect" Huntington displayed in her landscape paintings and said they demonstrated how much women artists had advanced beyond the characteristics — what he called "niggling treatment" and "love of petty details" — that the public had been using to deprecate women's art as trivial.

Huntington exhibited regularly with the Society of American Artists at end of the 19th century. (Note: Among others, she exhibited at the Society's exhibitions in 1898, when one of her paintings was called "clever"; in 1899, when she sold a painting for $250;) At the beginning of the next, just a few years before the Society merged with the National Academy of Design, she placed two paintings in one of the Academy's shows and at the same time participated in an exhibition of works by members, students, and instructors at the Art Students League. In the early 1900s, her paintings shown at the Pan-American Exposition (1901), and she begag to show frequently at the New York MacDowell Club. (Note: MacDowell Club appearances included show held in 1913, 1915, 1917, and 1919,) In 1911, when she showed paintings in her studio, a critic for American Art News praised her recent progress, called attention to "forceful marines painted on the Cornwall Coast", and admired in general the "breadth and directness" of her style. Reviewing her contributions to a MacDowell show in 1913, critics saw freshness and vivacity in one painting and a modernist use of broken colors and flat treatment in another.

Her work received mixed reviews when she showed eight paintings in a solo exhibition at the MacDowell Club that year. One critic thought two still lifes were grotesque but praised the "broad technique" evident in a painting of an old house. Another liked some of the work but thought that in one painting the method was "too intrusive". A third said the show was uneven: the shore scenes disappointing but the still lifes well executed and one still life, in particular, having brilliant colors in "the pointillist method" and a figure that was "capitally done".

In 1914, Huntington gave a solo exhibition of 125 paintings at Boston's Copely Hall Galleries. The show received a lengthy and entirely positive review in the Boston Evening Transcript and proved to be popular with the general public and art collectors. The Evening Transcript's reviewer praised Huntington's skill in handling a variety of styles while retaining "ardor, vigor, [and] gusto" in all her work. The following year, the Worcester Art Museum gave her a solo exhibition of 20 paintings and she contributed a painting to the fine arts exhibition of the Panama–Pacific International Exposition.

Huntington was a member of the National Association of Women Painters and Sculptors, participated regularly in their exhibitions from the mid-teens of the 20th century through the early 1940s, and served as the association's vice president for two years in the 1930s. In 1931, Henry McBride of the New York Sun said Huntington and another artist dominated an association exhibition and praised Huntington for her wit and satirical point of view. Reviewing the same show, a critic for Art News said none of the other exhibitors matched Huntington's ability.

She joined the Society of Independent Artists when it was formed in 1917 and was named a director the following year. She contributed paintings to its first annual exhibition and contributed to many others thereafter. Reviewing a show held in 1928, a critic for Art News singled out two Huntington watercolors as "stunning".

In 1919, she won a purchase prize for a painting called "Cornwall Cliffs" at the Pennsylvania Academy of the Fine Arts annual exhibition.

Huntington was a founding member of the New York Society of Women Artists. Established in 1925, the group aimed to control the quality of its exhibitions by restricting its membership to 30 carefully chosen members all of whom were welcome to participate in any show. The founders believed this method better than the jury selection of works used by the National Association of Women Painters and Sculptors. A writer for Art News said the charter members were "all progressive painters whose work is in the modern spirit". Another critic positioned the group as "poles apart from all that is conventional and academic". Ten years later, they were, according to one source, commonly identified as "the left wing of the feminine artistic movement". Huntington showed with the group from their first exhibition in 1926 through the rest of her career and was, at various times, the group's recording secretary, vice president, president.

When Huntington showed shore and harbor scenes in a solo exhibition at Manhattan's Midtown Galleries in 1934, the New York press praised her paintings as vigorous, brightly colored, and bold. One noted their "slashing rhythms" and "clarity of design". One said she had succeeded in eliminating unnecessary detail, while another, praising her dynamism and sense of vitality, said she had further to go in "simplifying her often overfilled compositions". She showed at the Midtown again two years later. The critical response was entirely positive. A reviewer for the New York Sun said she had "never shown to greater advantage" and one from Art News said she had dealt with her subjects delightfully.

In 1939, she received a solo exhibition in the Passedoit Gallery in New York. Called "The World's Fair in Water Color", the show took a satirical swipe at sculptures shown at the 1939 New York World's Fair. An Art News critic called the result funny but ephemeral. Two years later, she showed many of the same works at a solo exhibition at the Marie Sterner Gallery with proceeds from sales to benefit the British War Relief Society. In 1946, in reviewing a solo of oil paintings and watercolors at a gallery in the Barbizon Hotel, a critic for Art Digest said her work was "wonderful and direct". She showed infrequently in the 1950s and died in her 92nd year in April 1958.

=== Technique and artistic style ===
Miss Huntington's teachers have been J. Alden Weir, Robert Reid, Robert Henri, and Lucien Simon. It would be quite impossible to imagine what a composite of these four men's styles should form, and Miss Huntington's style, or styles, rather, do not include anything that looks like a composite. She has had the benefit of influences outside of her teachers' classrooms, too, and her mind has been eagerly receptive of all wide-awake modern art movements, so that it is possible to classify her only in a general way as a modernist, very earnest and zealous, very experimental, and greatly in love with her vocation.

— Anonymous critic, writing for the Boston Evening Transcript, January 17, 1914, reviewing a solo exhibition at Copley Hall

Huntington made oil paintings as well as watercolors and gouaches. Her main subjects were landscapes, marines, and still lifes. All of her work was figurative and modernist, with one early critic noting "a pronounced distaste for the conventional."

She worked in a variety of styles. Her work was richly colored and critics said it was bold, forceful, and direct. A critic said her paintings "scintillate in rich color", Another said they were "vital and engaging". And a third credited her with "brilliant fusing of color and design".

Huntington did not usually date or give titles to her paintings. She signed them Margaret Huntington, Margaret W. Huntington, or Margaret Wendell Huntington.

== Personal life and family ==
Huntington was born on July 6, 1866, in Nahant, Massachusetts. Her birth name was Margaret Wendell Huntington. Her father was William Reed Huntington, a prominent Episcopalian priest. Her mother was Theresa Reynolds Huntington who kept house for the family until her untimely death in 1872. After that death, her mother's sister, Marion Reynolds, lived with the family and kept house. Huntington was educated in private schools in Worcester, Massachusetts. When her father was appointed Rector of Grace Church in Manhattan, she and the other members of the family moved from Worcester to New York. She continued to live with her father in the church rectory until his death in 1909. When she was not traveling, she usually spent her summers in a large cottage called Inchcape located in North East Harbor, Maine, which had been donated to the family by the philanthropist and art collector Catharine Lorillard Wolfe at the end of the 19th century. After 1909, she usually spent the colder months in Manhattan where she lived and worked at locations on Washington Square and streets in that vicinity.
