= Pedro de Matheu =

Salvadoran artist

- Born: Pedro Adolfo Francisco de Matheu Montalvo; 5 June 1900; Santa Ana, El Salvador
- Died: 22 April 1965 (aged 64); Madrid, Spain
- Occupation: Artist

Pedro "Pierre" Adolfo Francisco de Matheu Montalvo (5 June 1900 – 22 April 1965) was a Salvadoran artist. Born in Santa Ana, he moved to Europe with his family at the age of three. By the 1920s, he studied at the École des Beaux-Arts and worked in the workshops of painters Claudio Castelucho and Alexander Altmann. His artwork was exhibited in multiple museums in France before moving back to Spain. His work was part of the art competition at the 1932 Summer Olympics.

== Biography ==
Pedro "Pierre" Adolfo Francisco de Matheu Montalvo was born on 5 June 1900 in Santa Ana, El Salvador. His father, Pedro Jaime de Matheu Salazar, was the El Salvadorian ambassador to Spain and a member of the International Olympic Committee. de Matheu's cousin was Manuel de Falla, a Spanish musician.

At the age of three, de Matheu and his family moved to Europe and would live there for the rest of his life. For his education in the 1920s, he studied at the École des Beaux-Arts in Paris, France. He divided his time living in France and in Spain, where most of his family resided. In addition to his own studio, he worked in the workshops of painters Claudio Castelucho and Alexander Altmann. From 1923 to 1925, de Matheu's own art was exhibited in multiple museums such as the Maison de L'Amérique latine, Palais Galliera, and Galeries Georges Petit. In 1927, he moved to Spain permanently, living in Puerto Real.

Outside of painting, he also practiced interior design. For the 1932 Summer Olympics held in Los Angeles, United States, he submitted four works for the art competitions. Though, it is unknown whether his works were paintings or a different medium.

In 1941, his art was exhibited in El Salvador for the first time, doing so in the Ministry of Foreign Affairs' gallery. In 1950, he met fellow Salvadorian artist Carlos Cañas in Paris and befriended him. Four years later, de Matheu visited El Salvador for the first time since he was three to hold another exhibition, doing so in San Salvador. He later died on 22 April 1965 in Madrid, Spain, at the age of 66.
