= Senator Cushman =

Senator Cushman may refer to:

- Henry W. Cushman (1805–1863), Massachusetts State Senate
- Joshua Cushman (1761–1834), Massachusetts State Senate
