= Senator Folger =

Senator Folger may refer to:

- Charles J. Folger (1818–1884), New York State Senate
- John Hamlin Folger (1880–1963), North Carolina State Senate
- Walter Folger Jr. (1765–1849), Massachusetts State Senate
