= Mary Riter Hamilton =

Canadian artist (1867–1954)

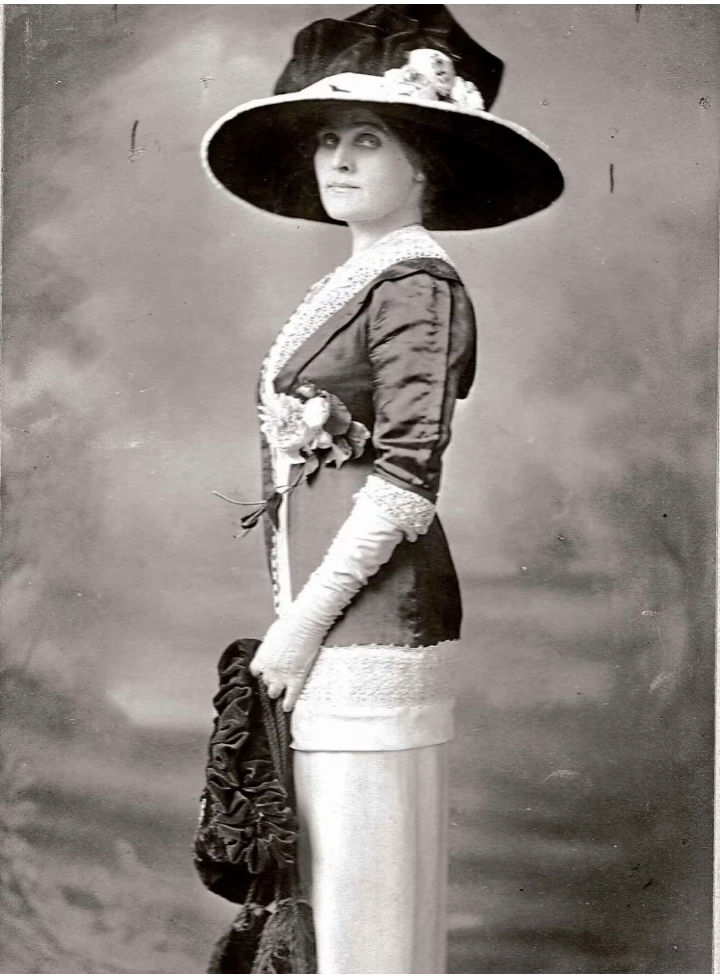
- Born: September 7, 1867; Culross, Ontario
- Died: April 5, 1954 (aged 86); Vancouver, British Columbia
- Spouse: Charles W. Hamilton

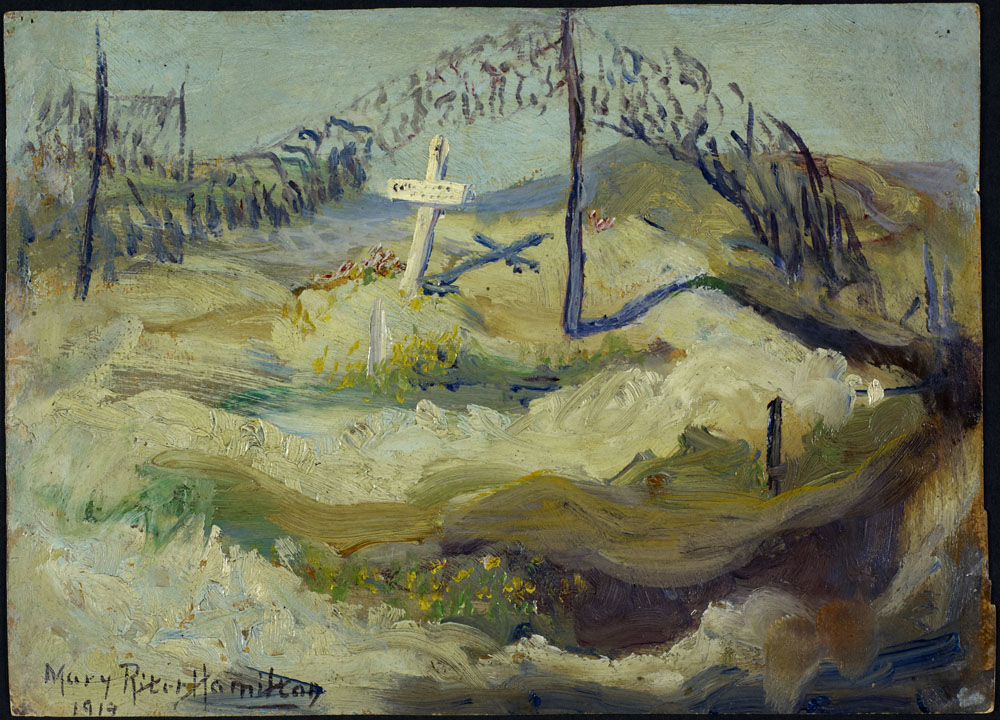
Isolated Grave and Camouflage, Vimy Ridge (1919), France

Mary Riter Hamilton (7 September 1867 – 5 April 1954) was a Canadian painter, etcher, drawing artist, textile artist, and ceramics artist who spent much of her career painting abroad in countries including Belgium, France, Germany, Holland, Italy, Spain, and the United States.

She gained renown as Canada's first female battlefield artist, pioneering an empathetic style of painting the trenches and ruined towns of Belgium and France in the immediate aftermath of the Great War. Among her most famous works are her oil on cardboard Trenches on the Somme (1919), her oil on wove paper Isolated Grave and Camouflage, Vimy Ridge (1919), and her oil on board Market Among the Ruins of Ypres, a depiction of the survivors of the war and the ongoing reconstruction in the war-battered town of Ypres. She shaped an ethical portrayal of the war by drawing attention to the war's destruction and by mourning the dead through her work.

Mary Riter Hamilton's work developed in three distinctive periods and styles. The first period (1901-1911) comprised over one hundred works painted and drawn in Europe that established her in Canada following her TransCanada exhibition tour from 1911 to 1912. This early style is best represented by her oil painting Easter Morning, La Petite Penitente (c. 1906) and her watercolour Young Girl in Blue Dress (1911).

Hamilton's second period (1912-1918) was inspired by her return to Canada in 1911, shifting her focus on Western Canada, as she painted the Rockies and the prairies, as well as scenery in the cities and forests of Alberta, British Columbia, Manitoba, and Saskatchewan. In this, she pursued a distinctive vision for rendering Canada's West and honouring its Indigenous peoples.

Hamilton's third period is focussed on her battlefield art as she depicted the destroyed landscapes of World War I, and drew the portraits of marginalized war workers and civilians returning to their destroyed villages. Exceptionally prolific and inspired, her over 320 battlefield works constitute her “magnum opus.”

Painting en plein air, with impressionistic flair, her work increasingly eschewed studio finish. In her work, Hamilton embraced the perspective of the underdog, showing sympathy for the socially underprivileged and the suffering, while being bold in transgressing constraining institutional boundaries. In this, she helped shape women's art and Canadian art, even though she was denied a place in the National Gallery of Canada.

== Life and career ==
Mary Riter was born in Culross, Ontario (now part of South Bruce, ON), on 7 September 1867. While there has been confusion regarding the year of her birth with scholars, curators, and archivists speculating that she was born in 1874, 1868, or 1867, Irene Gammel's 2020 book I Can Only Paint: The Story of Battlefield Artist Mary Riter Hamilton uses Census data to document that the accurate birth year is 1867. The Census data corroborates a consistent birth year of 1867 until her mid-twenties, when it first changes after the death of her husband. The subsequent census data testifies to the age deflation stemming from her own efforts to align her reported age with her new public identity and new life circumstances after the death of her husband. She projected a youthful image to escape the ageism and sexism of society.

As the youngest of five siblings, Mary was born to homesteading parents. Her mother, Charity Riter, and one of her brothers, Joseph, supported her striving for artistic expression from early on. Suffering setbacks when the farm burnt down, the Riter family showed collective resilience, eventually building a new life as homesteaders in Manitoba, where Mary lived for a few years as a teenager. Still in her teens, she returned to live in Port Arthur, now Thunder Bay, striking out on her own at an early age. Here she met Charles W. Hamilton, a dry goods merchant, with whom she partnered in running the Paris Dry Goods House. The pair married in July 1889, though the marriage was short-lived, as Charles Watson died suddenly in 1893 following an infection when Mary was in her mid-twenties. She also lost her baby son who was stillborn. These losses had a deep impact, prompting her new career.

While she had been taking sporadic painting lessons during her marriage, now she turned to building a professional artistic career. She began painting, exhibiting, and selling ceramics, what was then called china painting, and watercolours in Winnipeg, Manitoba. She studied in Toronto, Ontario, taking lessons from Mary Hiester Reid, as well as studying in the United States.

=== European Period (1901-1911) ===
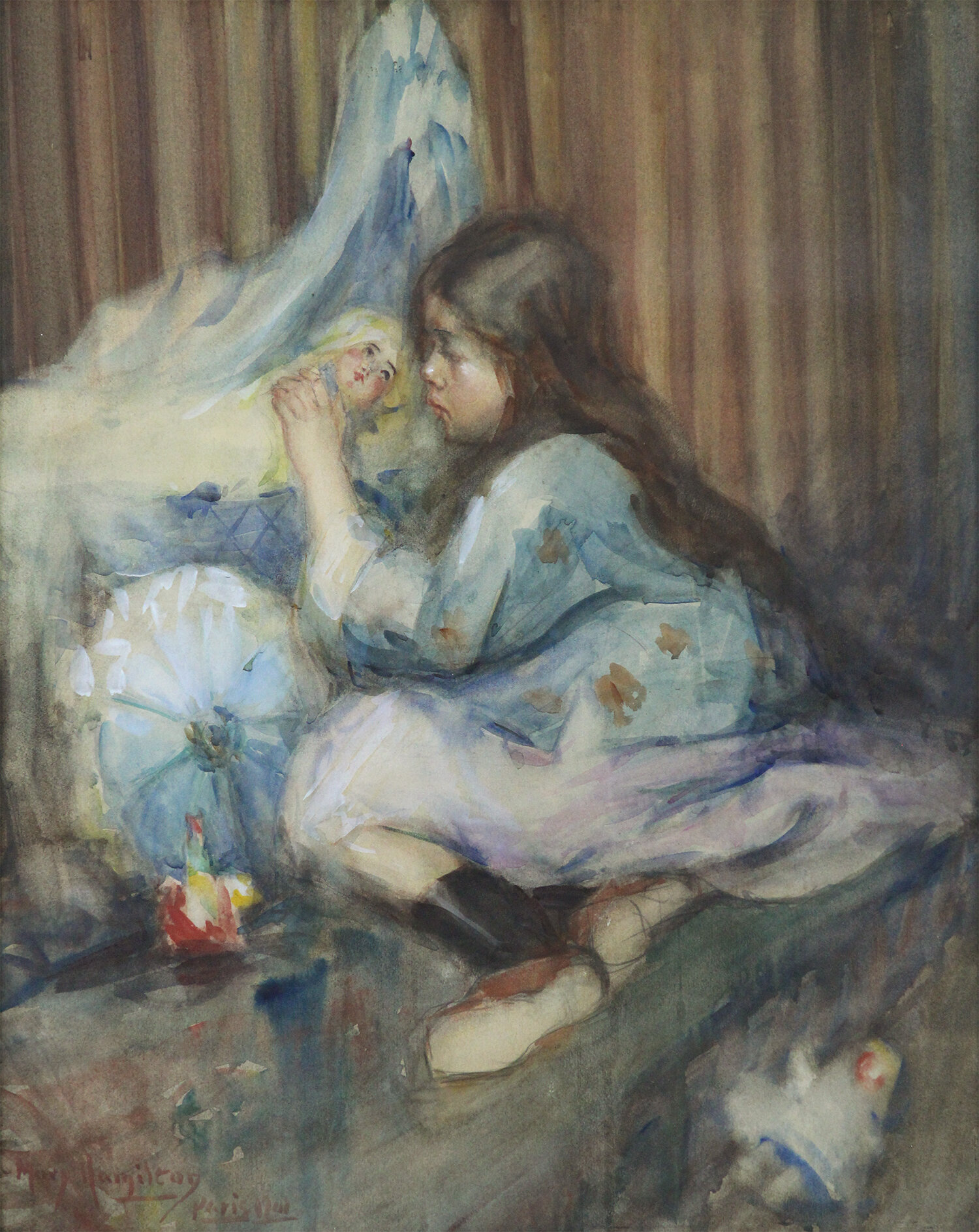
Young Girl in Blue Dress (1911), Uno Langmann Limited

In 1901, she sailed overseas to study in Berlin, Germany, taking private lessons from renowned Secession painter Franz Skarbina, as well as in Italy, the Netherlands, Spain, and France. In Paris, at the Académie Vitti, she took a portraiture class with Jacques-Émile Blanche, and studied with Luc-Olivier Merson and Paul Gervais, while taking private lessons from Claudio Castelucho. Settling in Paris, she lived and worked in studios on the Rue de la Grande Chaumière and later on Rue Notre Dame des Champs.

From 1905 on, she exhibited her work at the French Salon, the official art exhibition of the Académie des Beaux-Arts. During this time, she was extremely prolific, producing some 150 paintings and drawings including many scenes from Holland, Italy, Spain, and Brittany, France. She was inspired by themes like motherhood, as seen in her oil painting Maternity, as well as poverty, and experimented with self-portraiture. In 1911, after a decade in Europe, she returned her collection to Canada, marking her homecoming with a gallery show in Toronto with 150 paintings. This was followed by a highly successful exhibition tour of her work in Ottawa, Montreal, Winnipeg, Calgary, and Victoria, where she settled to paint, supporting herself by taking on portrait commissions.

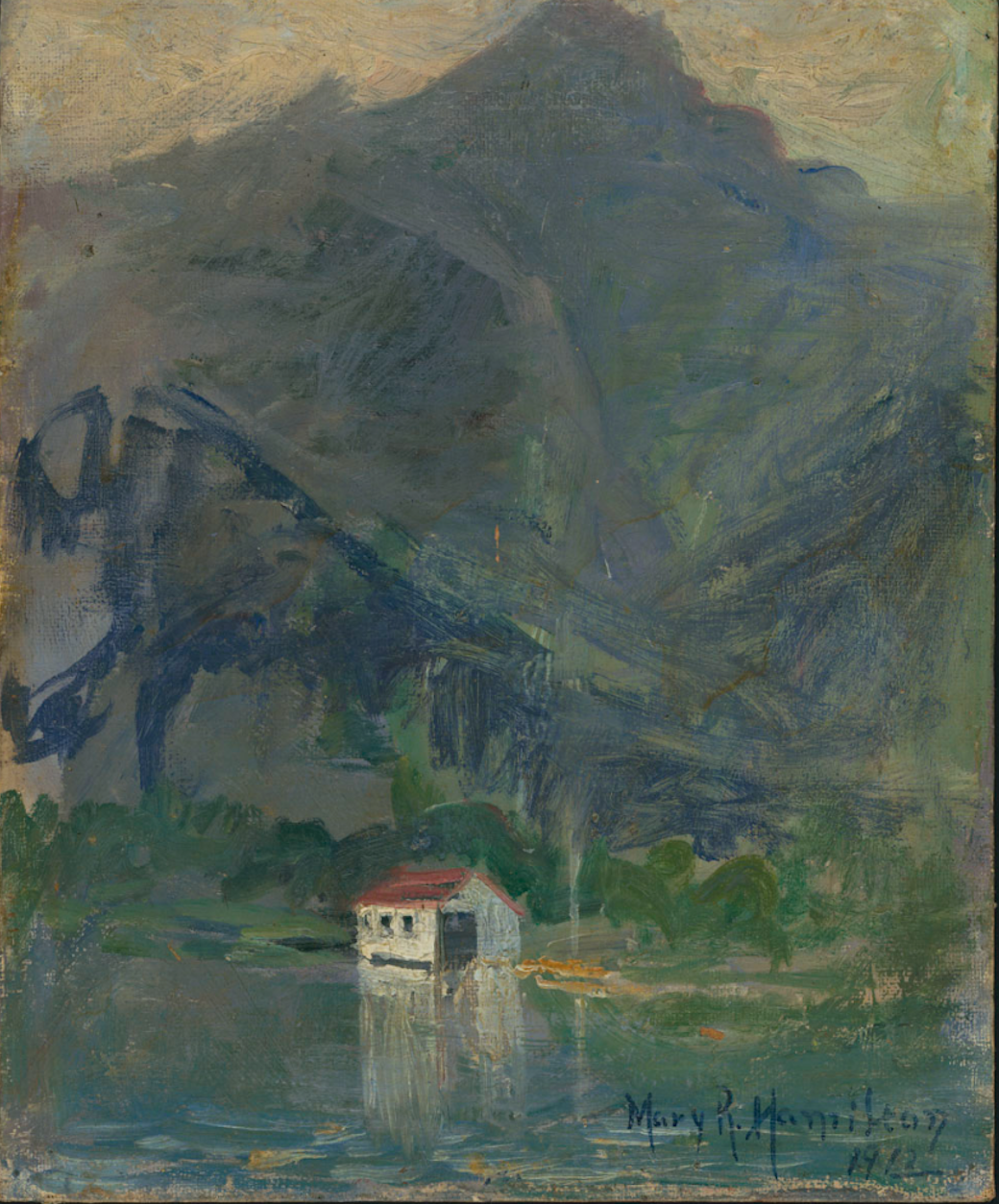
Canadian Rockies Sketch (1912), Library and Archives Canada

=== Canadian Period (1911-1918) ===
Upon returning to Canada in 1911, Mary Riter Hamilton's new vision was to paint the country by focusing on the West. As she saw it, the West was still neglected in Canada's art, the focus of the emerging National Gallery of Canada being on Central Canadian art and artists. Like the Group of Seven painters, who returned to Canada around the same time, to focus their eye on Northern Ontario, Hamilton had a patriotic vision for Canadian art. From 1911-1918, she painted and exhibited scenes of the Canadian West. Library and Archives Canada acquired one of these paintings entitled Canadian Rockies Sketch (1912). Hamilton's paintings depicted Indigenous peoples. She also made portraits of strong-minded women, a focus she would continue in her battlefield paintings and her later work. When Hamilton left Victoria in 1918, she was at the zenith of her career, surpassing the painter Emily Carr in recognition during that period.

=== Battlefield Period (1919-1921) ===
During the First World War, Mary Riter Hamilton actively campaigned to return to Europe as a war artist to document Canada's military contribution. She applied to the Canadian War Memorial Fund to become a war artist but was rejected, and it was only after moving to Vancouver in 1918 that she secured a commission from the War Amputations Club of British Columbia to travel overseas and paint the post-Armistice battlefields for their periodical, The Gold Stripe. This war veterans’ periodical collected stories, photographs, and memorabilia about the Great War.

In late April 1919, when Hamilton arrived at Vimy Ridge, "[i]t was cold and snowing," she recorded in her letter to The Gold Stripe, the weather mirroring that of two years prior when the Canadian Corps had seized the ridge. Her goal was to experience the spaces under hard conditions to get the spirit of them before it was too late to get a real impression, as she explained in this 1922 interview:

It is fortunate that I arrived before it was too late to get a real impression. The first day I went over Vimy [Ridge], snow and sleet were falling, and I was able to realize what the soldiers had suffered. If as you and others tell me, there is something of the suffering and heroism of the war in my pictures it is because at that moment the spirit of those who fought and died seemed to linger in the air. Every splintered tree and scarred clod spoke of their sacrifice. Since then, nature has been busy covering up the wounds, and in a few years the last sign of war will have disappeared. To have been able to preserve some memory of what this consecrated corner of the world looked like after the storm is a great privilege and all the reward an artist could hope for.

— Mary Riter Hamilton, in an interview with Frederick G. Falla, The McClure Newspaper Syndicate for release September 10, 1922

Unlike artists affiliated with the Canadian War Memorial Fund, who conducted brief sketching expeditions to battlefields and subsequently created large-sized paintings in their studios in London and Paris, Hamilton diverged from the established norms of war painting. Many of her paintings are small and intimate and were painted directly in the trenches. She pioneered a distinctive style characterized by its visceral quality, that communicates her artistic urgency.

For two and a half years, Hamilton lived in primitive huts and tents with a Canadian army contingent at Vimy Ridge and from late 1919 on her own. She travelled on foot. She painted on canvas as well as on plywood, paper, and cardboard, using repurposed supplies, and grinding her own colours on the battlefield.

Many of her artworks like her 1919 oil painting Battlefields possess a haunting emptiness, evoking the memory of the absent soldiers. Additionally, Hamilton depicted both the marked graves of individual soldiers and the mass graves where entire regiments had met their fate. Through these works, she emphasized the imperative of commemorating and grieving for each individual loss.

Between 1919 and 1922, Hamilton painted with whatever materials came to hand, recording the destruction left by the war, the commemorations of those lost and the celebrations of the return to normal life. She painted more than 320 images in the difficult and often dangerous conditions of the former Western Front.

She lived in makeshift shelters, including pillboxes, as seen in her oil The Sadness of the Somme (1920), defying the challenges including poor food, hostile weather, and the danger of unexploded shells. Mary Riter Hamilton produced the largest known collection of First World War art by a single artist.

During this time, she wrote letters to her friends at The Gold Stripe, but also to her sporadic patron, Margaret Janet Hart in Victoria, and others. These letters, held today at the archives of the Modern Literature and Culture Research Centre testify to the hardships of the experience and the physical and emotional demands of the expedition.

Exhibitions of the earlier paintings took place in Vancouver and Victoria in 1920. Further exhibitions were held at the Palais Garnier in Paris in 1922 and in Amiens at the Somme. In 1926, she donated 227 of her battlefield works to the Dominion Archives, paying homage to the wounded and the dead Canadian soldiers of the First World War.

== Gallery ==
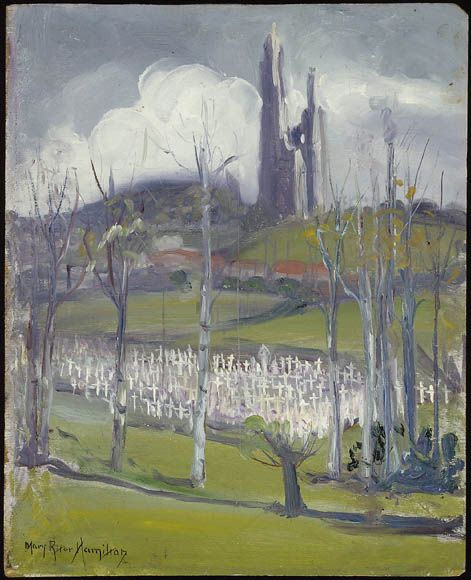
Mt. St. Eloi (c. 1919-1920), Library and Archives Canada

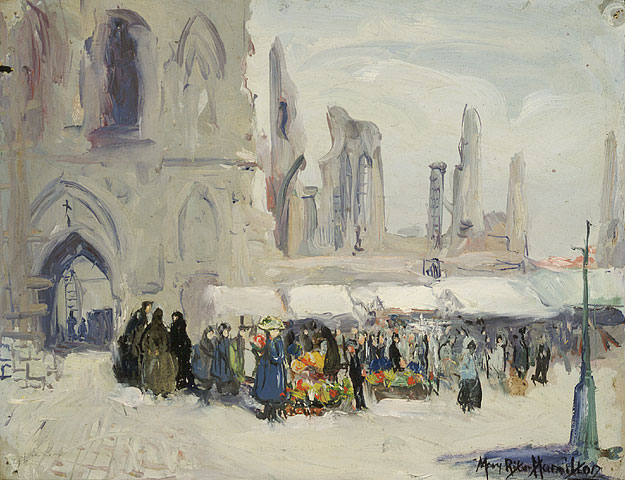
“Cloth Hall, Ypres – Market Day,” a painting by Mary Riter Hamilton, 1920 « Les Halles aux Draps d’Ypres par un jour de marché »; tableau peint par Mary Riter Hamilton en 1920 (16591440469)

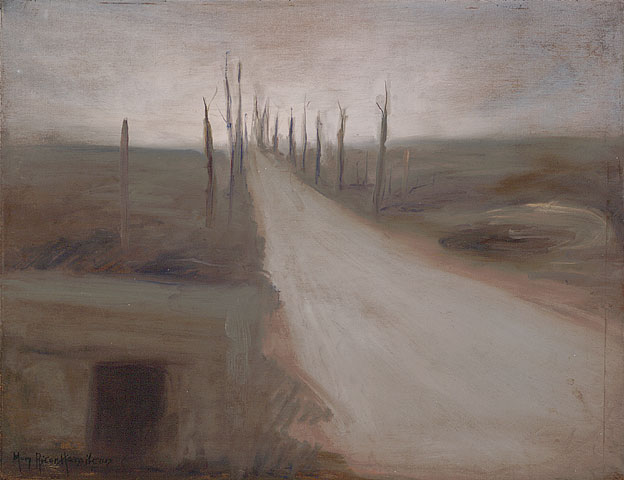
The Sadness of the Somme (1920), Library and Archives Canada

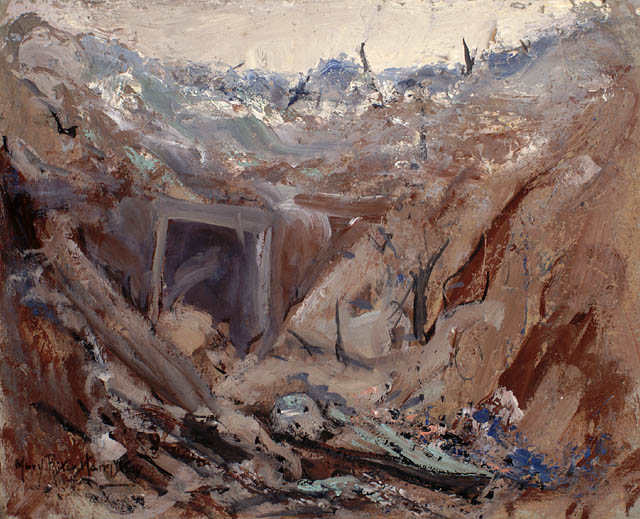
Dug Out on the Somme (1919), Library and Archives Canada

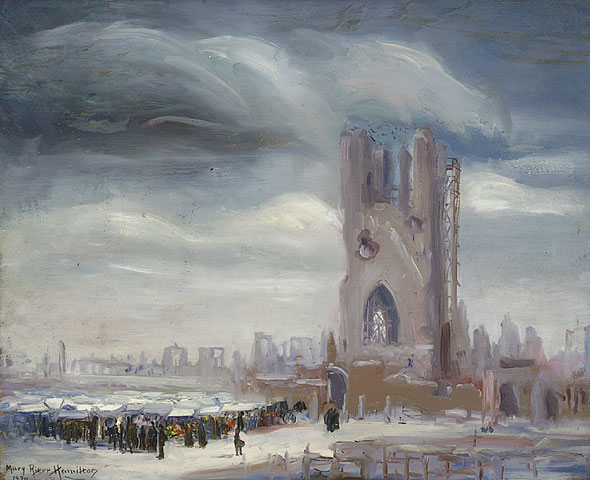
Market Among the Ruins of Ypres (1920), Library and Archives Canada

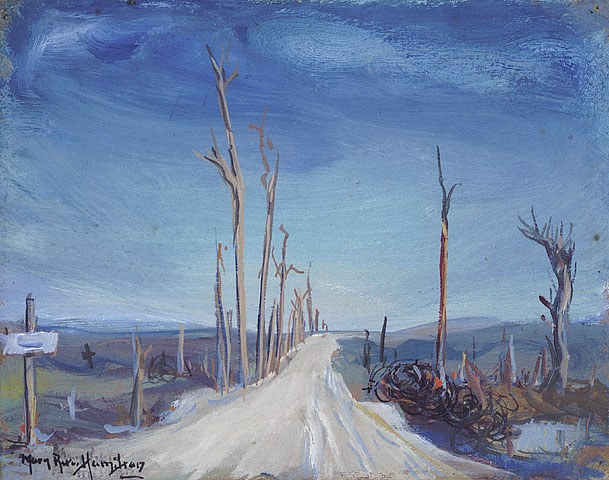
The Kemmel Road, Flanders (1920), Library and Archives Canada

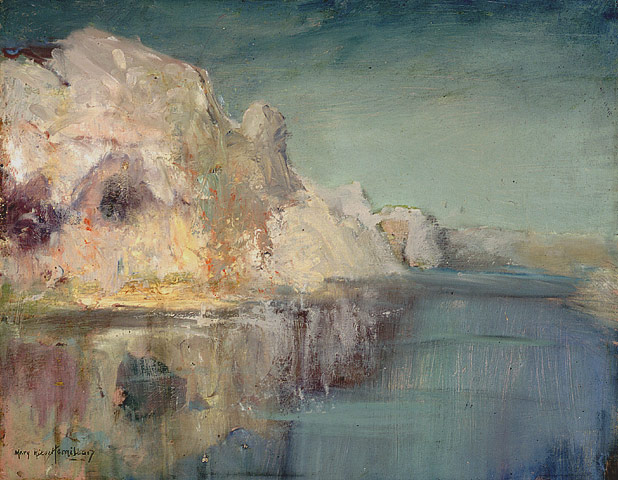
A Misty Morning, the Ramparts of Ypres (1921), Library and Archives Canada

== Later life ==
From the 1930s on, she lived in Vancouver, British Columbia, and earned an income by teaching students to paint. She still painted occasionally but never again with the prolific vigor that characterized her previous work. She did so until she was in her 80s.

She died in 1954. She had planned her funeral and instructed her executor, her nephew Frank Riter, to have her ashes transported to Port Arthur, Ontario, to be buried beside her husband.

== Honors ==
- Ordre des Palmes Académiques, Officier d'Académie, France, 1922 and the first Canadian made an officer of the Académie française;
- Diploma and Gold Medal, International Exposition of Modern Industrial and Decorative Arts, 1925

== Legacy ==
In 1988, War Amputations of Canada released No Man's Land, a documentary short focusing on Mary Riter Hamilton and the collection of her war paintings in the care of Library and Archives Canada.

- Silver Award (Historical Programming) - 1989 Houston International Film & Video Festival (Texas)
- Certificate for Creative Excellence (History) - 1989 U.S. Industrial Film & Video Festival (Illinois)
- Achievement Award - 1989 Society for Technical Communication's Audio/Visual Competition (California
- Honourable Mention - 1989 National Educational Film & Video Festival (California)
- Honourable Mention - 1989 Columbus International Film Festival (Ohio)

In 2020, Canada Post saluted the country's unofficial first woman battlefield artist by issuing a stamp for Remembrance Day featuring her work, Trenches on the Somme, (1919).

In 2024, Historica Canada released a Heritage Minute of Hamilton's work as a war artist starring Megan Follows.
