= Ellen Ravenscroft =

American painter

- Born: Ellen Caroline Ravenscroft; April 29, 1867; Jackson, Mississippi
- Died: January 9, 1949 (aged 81); New York, New York

Ellen Ravenscroft (April 29, 1867 – January 9, 1949) was an American artist known for her modernist paintings and prints. She was trained in New York by William Merritt Chase and Robert Henri and received additional training from Claudio Castelucho in Paris. She worked in oil and watercolor media and made lithographic and monotype prints. As a member of an early 20th-century group called the Provincetown Printers, she also used an innovative technique to make white-line woodblock prints. In all these media, her main subjects were landscapes, still lifes, and portraits. She exhibited widely, mainly with nonprofit clubs and societies in New York, other American cities, and Paris. Critics drew attention to admirable qualities in her work. For example, in 1912, a critic said her paintings were "strong and direct"; in 1924, a critic said a painting called "In the Steerage" had "something quite unusual and gripping about it"; and in 1926, the principal critic for the New York Evening Post said Ravenscroft "makes landscapes and flowers into abstractions, then gives them a little fillip of life and vibrant emotion."

Periodically throughout her career, Ravenscroft taught art students in private schools and outdoor summer classes. During the war years of the 1940s, she founded and managed the Studio Gallery on Fifth Avenue in Manhattan.

== Early life and training ==
Ellen Ravenscroft, 1916, Old Country Home, oil on canvas, 16 x 20 inches

Ellen Ravenscroft, 1918, Still Life, white-line block print, 16 1/2 x 12 inches

Ellen Ravenscroft, about 1920, Provincetown Street, white-line woodblock print, 7 3/4 x 8 3/4 inches

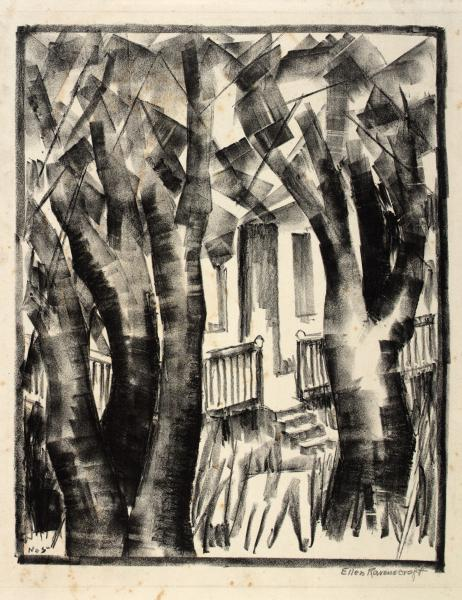
Ellen Ravenscroft, about 1920, untitled, lithograph on paper

Ellen Ravenscroft, about 1920, The Fountain, monoprint, 7 3/4 x 4 1/2 inches

Ellen Ravenscroft, 1930, Provincetown, white-line woodblock print, 11 x 13 1/2 inches

Ellen Ravenscroft, undated, Flowers in a Blue Striped Vase, oil on canvas, 9 1/2 x 15 1/2 inches

Ellen Ravenscroft, undated, Seascape with Nude, monoprint, 11 5/8 x 8 7/8 inches

Ravenscroft was born in Jackson, Mississippi, and raised in Troy, Alabama, and LaGrange, Georgia. In the 1890s, she moved to Manhattan and took art classes first at the National Academy of Design and then at the New York School of Art, where her teachers included William Merritt Chase and Robert Henri. She received honorable mention awards from the School of Art in 1895 and from a summer session art class in 1897. Early in the new century, she traveled to Paris to take classes with Claudio Castelucho at Académie Colarossi, and by 1905 was back in New York, having become a member of the Catherine Lorillard Wolfe Art Students' Club and won a prize for best portrait study in its annual exhibition of that year.

== Career in art ==
In the early 1900s, at the beginning of her career, Ravenscroft transitioned from showing with the sudents' subsidiary of Catherine Lorillard Wolfe Club to showing with the club itself. As her career progressed, she showed with art organizations outside New York, including the Portland Art Museum in Oregon, and the galleries in Provincetown, Massachusetts, where she spent most of her summers. From the mid-1920s to the end of her career, Ravenscroft continued to spend the summer months in Provincetown and spent the rest of the year in Manhattan, where she typically showed in organizations like the New York Society of Women Artists, the National Association of Women Artists, the National Association of Women Painters and Sculptors, and the Society of Independent Artists.

=== Pre-war years in Portland ===
After moving to Portland in 1911, Ravenscroft showed a painting in a 1912 exhibition at the city's art museum that a local critic saw as "strong and direct" and "post-impressionist in treatment."

=== War years in New York and New Jersey ===
She returned to Manhattan in 1914, and during the next four years she showed regularly in exhibitions staged by the Lorillard Wolfe Club. In 1915, she took the club's landscape prize for a painting called "Ice Storm". Reviewing the show, one critic praised Ravenscroft's ability to bring out the character of her subjects and another praised her paintings' composition and design. The following year, a critic noted "brilliant color" and "freshness of tone" in a club exhibition. Over the next few years after that, critics continued to comment on her contributions to club exhibitions.

In 1915, Ravenscroft joined with other women artists in a benefit exhibition at New York's Macbeth Galleries to support the women's suffrage movement. During 1915 and 1916, Ravenscroft painted in the large private gardens within estates located in Bernardsville, New Jersey. During these years, she joined the National Association of Women Painters and Sculptors.

In 1915, Ravenscroft participated in a two-person show at New York's Petrus Stuyvesant Club and the following year she began more than a decade of contributions to exhibitions staged by the Society of Independent Artists. In 1917, she showed pastels, watercolors and drawings in an exhibition at the New York MacDowell Club and left New York to spend the academic year in Washington, D.C.

=== 1920s in Manhattan and Provincetown ===
In 1918 and for much of the 1920s, Ravenscroft summered in Provincetown and spent the rest of the year in New York. During that time, she showed regularly with two organizations in Provincetown, the Sail Loft Club and the Provincetown Art Association. A critic for Art News commented that her contributions to a 1923 Sail Loft Club show were "well designed and executed". In 1924, she began showing with the Salons of America in New York.

In 1923, Ravenscroft spent the academic year teaching and painting in St. Louis. In an exhibition held at the Kansas City Art Institute, she won a special prize for one of her oil paintings and an honorable mention award for one of her watercolors. During this time, she continued to summer in Provincetown and began designing sets for that town's Wharf Players theater group.

On her return to Manhattan in 1924, she showed in a group at the newly opened Holt Gallery. Writing in the Evening Post, Margaret Breuning described a painting called "Steerage" as "particularly well realized", and a critic for Art News said there was "something quite unusual and gripping about it." The following year, she became a founding member and corresponding secretary of the New York Society of Women Artists. She remained an officer of the organization during succeeding years and in 1941 became its president.

At the same time, she also helped to organize a multi-gallery exhibition called the Southern Exposition. Held in Manhattan, the exhibition was limited to New York artists who had been born below the Mason-Dixon Line. Reviewing the show, a critic for the New York Times said a painting of hers was more modern than others that were shown.

Over the remaining years of the 1920s, Ravenscroft showed with the New York Society of Women Artists and the Provincetown Art Association. Reviewing an exhibition of the Society of Women Artists in 1926, Margaret Breuning said Ravenscroft "makes landscapes and flowers into abstractions, then gives them a little fillip of life and vibrant emotion." Writing in April 1926, a reporter for the Philadelphia Inquirer referred to her as a brilliant painter.

=== 1930s and 1940s ===
During the 1930s and 1940s, Ravenscroft continued to show with the New York Society of Women Artists, the National Association of Women Painters and Sculptors, the Provincetown Art Association, and other nonprofit organizations. In 1934, she participated in two New York shows devoted to works by artists from the US South, the first, staged by the Dixie Club of New York, and the second by the Southern Women's National Democratic Organization.

In 1935, Ravenscroft helped plan exhibitions in a temporary art gallery set up by the government of the City of New York to help artists whose livelihoods were threatened by the ongoing economic depression in the US. A year later, she joined with eleven other women in a successful application to appear as a group in one of the gallery's exhibitions.

Beginning in 1938 and into the war years, Ravenscroft and other New York artists found it more and more difficult to get back and forth to their summer studios in Provincetown. In that year, train service to Provincetown was suspended, and during the war, rationing and critical shortages inhibited their ability to get there by car. In 1943, Ravenscroft addressed the problem by establishing and managing a gallery in New York to display and sell the Provincetown artists' work. Called the Studio Gallery, the new exhibition space also showed paintings by other artists, including members of the New York Society of Women Artists.

== Art teacher ==
She lectured on the importance of art training and exhibiting in the United States, emphasizing that a European education was no longer necessary.

While living in Portland, Oregon, in 1911, Ravenscroft was an art teacher at an Episcopal girls' boarding school called St. Helen's Hall. She returned to New York in 1914 and taught outdoor classes in nearby Bernardsville over the next two summers. She moved to Washington, D.C. in 1917 to teach at Mount Vernon Seminary, and in 1920 she moved to St. Louis, Missouri, to teach at the Mary Institute. The left that position in June 1923 and resumed working summers in Provincetown and in New York the rest of the year.

=== Technique, artistic style, and critical reception ===
Although primarily seen as a painter, Ravenscroft showed monotypes as early as 1912 and white-line block prints by 1918. Her style was seen as "modern" by which critics seemed to mean she favored flattened design and decorative simplification and was, in general, influenced by the European modernism of Paul Cézanne and the cubists. As one critic said, she and other American modernists of her time understood Cubism but "they experimented instead with modified forms of abstraction that would not estrange American viewers and collectors."

== Personal life and family ==
Ravenscroft used Ellen Ravenscroft as her professional name. A Social Security record of 1936 gave her name as Ellen Caroline Ravenscroft. The 1881 probate records related to her mother's death gave her name as Ellen C. Ravenscroft and a news item of 1917 also used that name.

Three sources uncontroversially confirm the month and day of Ravenscroft's birth as April 29. Regarding the year of birth there is uncertainty. The available sources that gave a year mostly gave one later than 1870. These are unlikely to be accurate since she was reported as three years old in the 1870 U.S. Census, suggesting a birth year of 1867. That report was supported by the U.S. Census of 1880, which reported her as 13 years old. One later record, a 1932 report of passenger arrivals in New York, gave her full birth date as April 29, 1869. Neither the Census records nor the lists of arrivals are highly reliable sources, but, given their contemporaneity and the virtual certainty that they would not list a person who was not yet born, the Census records are most likely to be correct. Her birth year is thus highly likely to have been 1967. Regarding place of birth, most sources give Jackson, Mississippi.

Ravenscroft's father was Albert S. Ravenscroft, an English-born physician who practiced in Mississippi and Alabama and who died before her 13th birthday. Ravenscroft's mother was Elizabeth J. Ravenscroft, a homemaker who died when Ravenscroft was 14. Ravenscroft had four older siblings, Myra, Kate, Alfred, and Harry, and she had one younger one, Frank. (Note: Ravenscroft's obituary notice in the New York Times established her position in the family of Albert S. and Elizabeth C. Ravenscroft. The survivors it listed, Katherine Liddell and Frank H. Ravenscroft, were Ellen Ravenscroft's niece and nephew. Both are shown to be connected to the Albert Ravenscroft family in the 1900 and 1910 US Census reports. In addition, Katharine is shown to have been Ravenscroft's niece in Katharine's 1960 obituary.)

In 1923, Ravenscroft was a founding member of a Provincetown theater group called the Wharf Players. She designed sets for the group's shows, acted as its secretary during its early years, and later was an assistant technical director and teacher of costume design in the group's Wharf Theater School.

Ravenscroft's support for women's art organizations like the New York Society of Women Artists put her, as one reporter stated, on "the left wing of the feminine artistic movement". Before the passage of the 19th Amendment, she was an advocate for women's suffrage. During the years of the Great Depression, she joined the Southern Women's National Democratic Organization of New York and was an outspoken supporter of the Democratic Party.

She died in New York City on January 9, 1949.
