= John Reed Jr. =

American politician

Member of the U.S. House of Representatives from Massachusetts
- In office March 4, 1813 – March 3, 1817
- Preceded by: Isaiah L. Green
- Succeeded by: Walter Folger Jr.
- Constituency: 8th district (1813–15); 9th district (1815–17)
- In office March 4, 1821 – March 3, 1841
- Preceded by: Walter Folger Jr.
- Succeeded by: Barker Burnell
- Constituency: 9th district (1821–23); 13th district (1823–33); 11th district (1833–41)

17th Lieutenant Governor of Massachusetts
- In office January 9, 1844 – January 11, 1851
- Governor: George N. Briggs
- Preceded by: Henry H. Childs
- Succeeded by: Henry W. Cushman

Personal details
- Born: September 2, 1781 West Bridgewater, Massachusetts, U.S.
- Died: November 25, 1860 (aged 79) West Bridgewater, Massachusetts, U.S.
- Party: Federalist; National Republican; Anti-Masonic; Whig
- Education: Brown University
- Occupation: Lawyer

John Reed Jr. (September 2, 1781 – November 25, 1860) was an American politician who was a U.S. representative from Massachusetts from 1813 until 1817 and the 17th lieutenant governor of Massachusetts from 1845 until 1851.

== Biography ==
Reed was born in West Bridgewater, Massachusetts, the son of politician John Reed Sr. He graduated from Brown University, Providence, Rhode Island, in 1803, and was a tutor of languages in that institution for two years, and principal of the Bridgewater, Massachusetts Academy in 1806 and 1807. He studied law, was admitted to the bar, and commenced practice in Yarmouth, Massachusetts.

Reed was elected a member of the American Antiquarian Society in 1814, and a Fellow of the American Academy of Arts and Sciences in 1830.

He was elected as a Federalist to the Thirteenth and Fourteenth Congresses (March 4, 1813 – March 3, 1817); elected to the Seventeenth through Twenty-third Congresses; elected as an Anti-Masonic candidate to the Twenty-fourth Congress, and elected as a Whig to the Twenty-fifth and Twenty-sixth Congresses (March 4, 1821 – March 3, 1841). He was chairman of the Committee on Revisal and Unfinished Business (Twenty-second Congress). He declined to be candidate for reelection in 1840.

He was the 17th lieutenant governor of Massachusetts (1845–1851).

Reed died in West Bridgewater, Plymouth County, Massachusetts. Interment was in Mount Prospect Cemetery, Bridgewater, Massachusetts.

U.S. House of Representatives
Preceded by Isaiah L. Green	Member of the U.S. House of Representatives from Massachusetts's 8th congressional district March 4, 1813 - March 3, 1815	Succeeded by William Baylies
Preceded by Laban Wheaton	Member of the U.S. House of Representatives from Massachusetts's 9th congressional district March 4, 1815 - March 3, 1817	Succeeded by Walter Folger Jr.
Preceded by Walter Folger Jr.	Member of the U.S. House of Representatives from Massachusetts's 9th congressional district March 4, 1821 - March 3, 1823	Succeeded by Henry W. Dwight
Preceded by William Eustis	Member of the U.S. House of Representatives from Massachusetts's 13th congressional district March 4, 1823 - March 3, 1833	Succeeded by District eliminated
Preceded by John Quincy Adams	Member of the U.S. House of Representatives from Massachusetts's 11th congressional district March 4, 1833 - March 3, 1841	Succeeded by Barker Burnell
Political offices
Preceded by Henry H. Childs	Lieutenant Governor of Massachusetts; 1844–1851	Succeeded by Henry W. Cushman
