= Franz Skarbina =

German painter

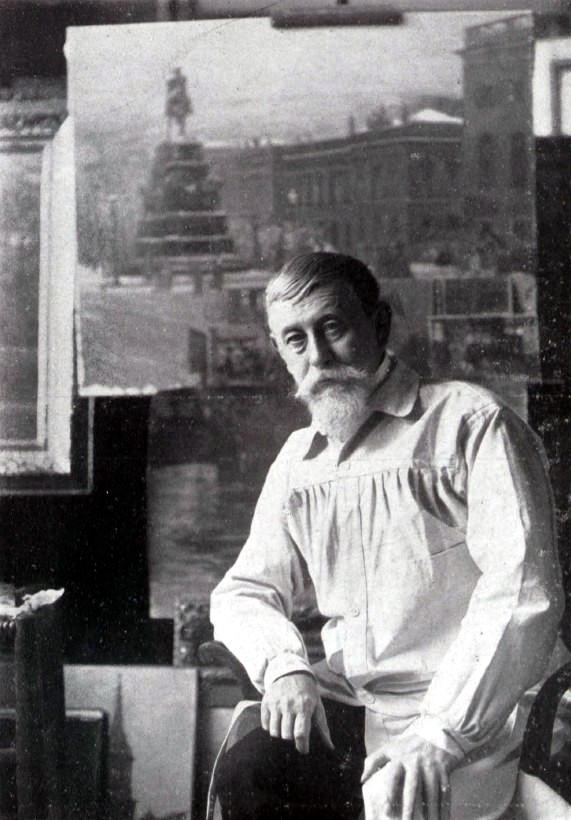
- Franz Skarbina in 1909. Photograph by Marta Wolff
- Born: February 24, 1849; Berlin, Prussia, German Confederation
- Died: May 18, 1910 (aged 61); Berlin, Prussia, German Empire

Franz Skarbina (24 February 1849 – 18 May 1910) was a German impressionist painter, draftsman, etcher and illustrator.

== Life ==
Born in Berlin, he was the son of a goldsmith from Zagreb. From 1865 to 1869, he studied at the Prussian Academy of Arts. After graduation, he spent two years as a tutor to the daughters of Count Friedrich von Perponcher-Sedlnitzky, during which time he travelled to Dresden, Vienna, Venice, Munich, Nuremberg and Merano. In 1877, he had acquired the funds to make a year-long study trip to the Netherlands, Belgium and France, where he came under the influence of impressionism.

He became an assistant teacher at the Prussian Academy in 1878 and, in 1881, he taught anatomical drawing at the Kunstgewerbemuseum Berlin. The following year, he returned to Paris and exhibited at the Salon. From 1885 to 1886, he was in Paris again, with side trips to Northern France, Belgium and the Netherlands. This is considered to be one of his most productive periods.

In 1888, he was appointed a professor at the Prussian Academy and, in 1892, became a full member there. A year later, however, he resigned his teaching position due to disagreements with the academy's Director, Anton von Werner. The problem stemmed from his participation in the "Group of Eleven", an association of artists dedicated to promoting their own exhibitions of what was then considered "radical" art, free of the academy's influence. This eventually (in 1898) led to the establishment of the Berlin Secession, of which Skarbina was a co-founder.

In 1895, he became a supervisory board member for the magazine Pan. In 1898, he served as one of the judges in a contest held by Ludwig Stollwerck to select the artists for a new series of trading cards.

In 1901, he gave private lessons to Canada’s first female battlefield artist Mary Riter Hamilton.

He died at his home in Berlin, from an acute kidney ailment, and is buried in the Old Cemetery of St. Jacobkirche. All of the items in his estate were destroyed during World War II.

== Selected paintings ==
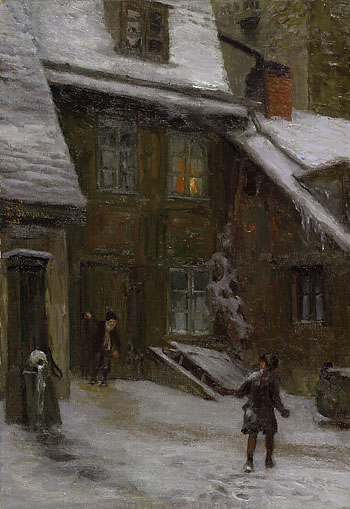
Courtyard in the Snow (1905)

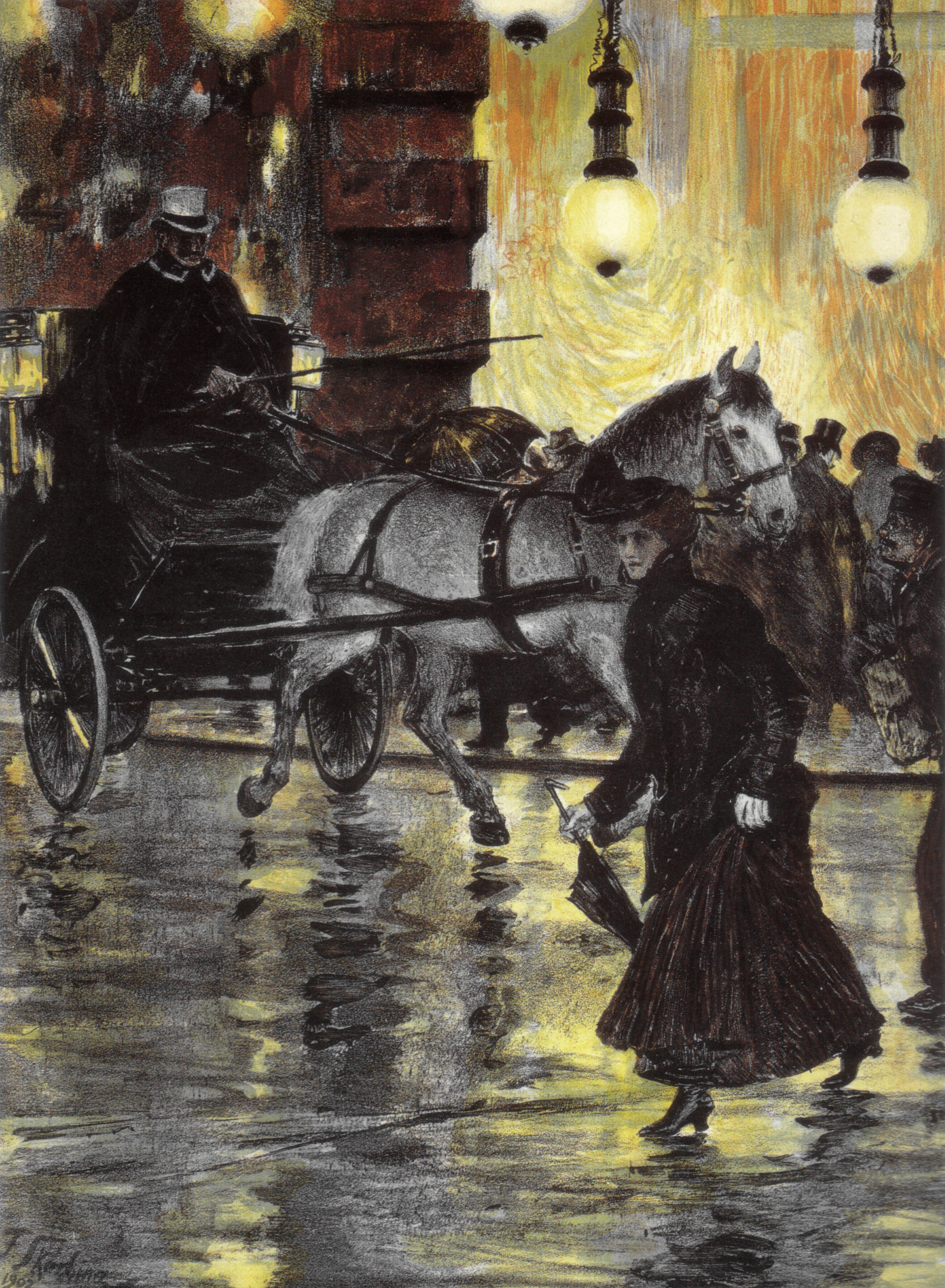
Friedrichstraße on a Rainy Evening (1902)

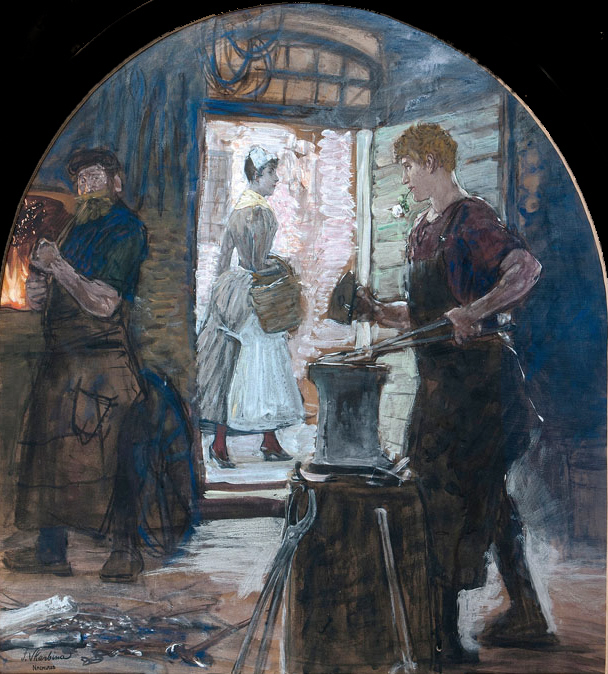
The Smith in Love

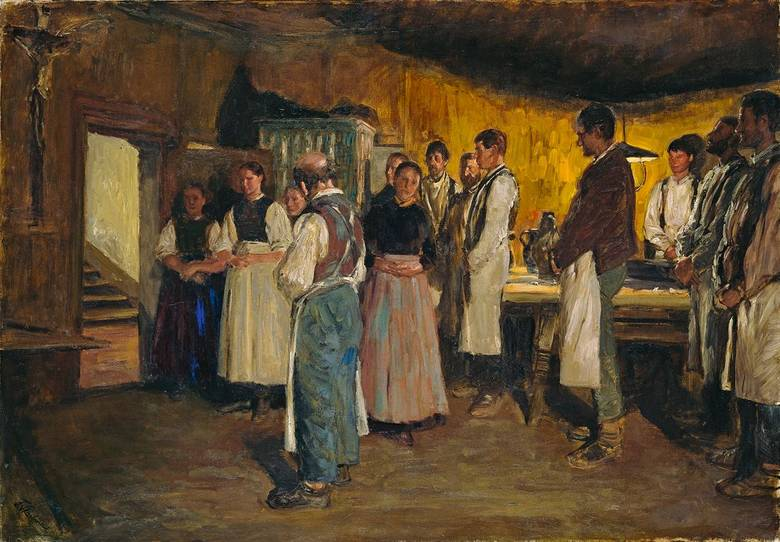
Evening Prayer (c. 1890)

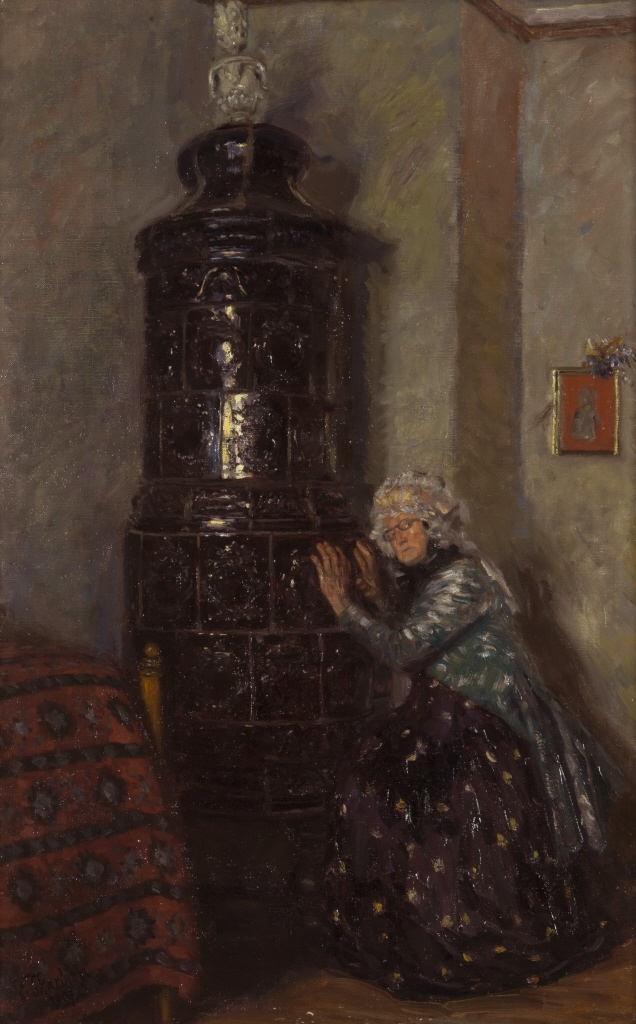
Old Woman
at the Oven (1907)

== Nazi-looted art ==
In 2016 Skarbina's Nach Hause was the object of a lawsuit filed by a Holocaust victim's son who was trying to locate the painting. David Toren requested that the Berlin auction house Villa Grisebach reveal the buyers of the Skarbina as well as two works by Beckmann.
