= Phebe Folger Coleman =

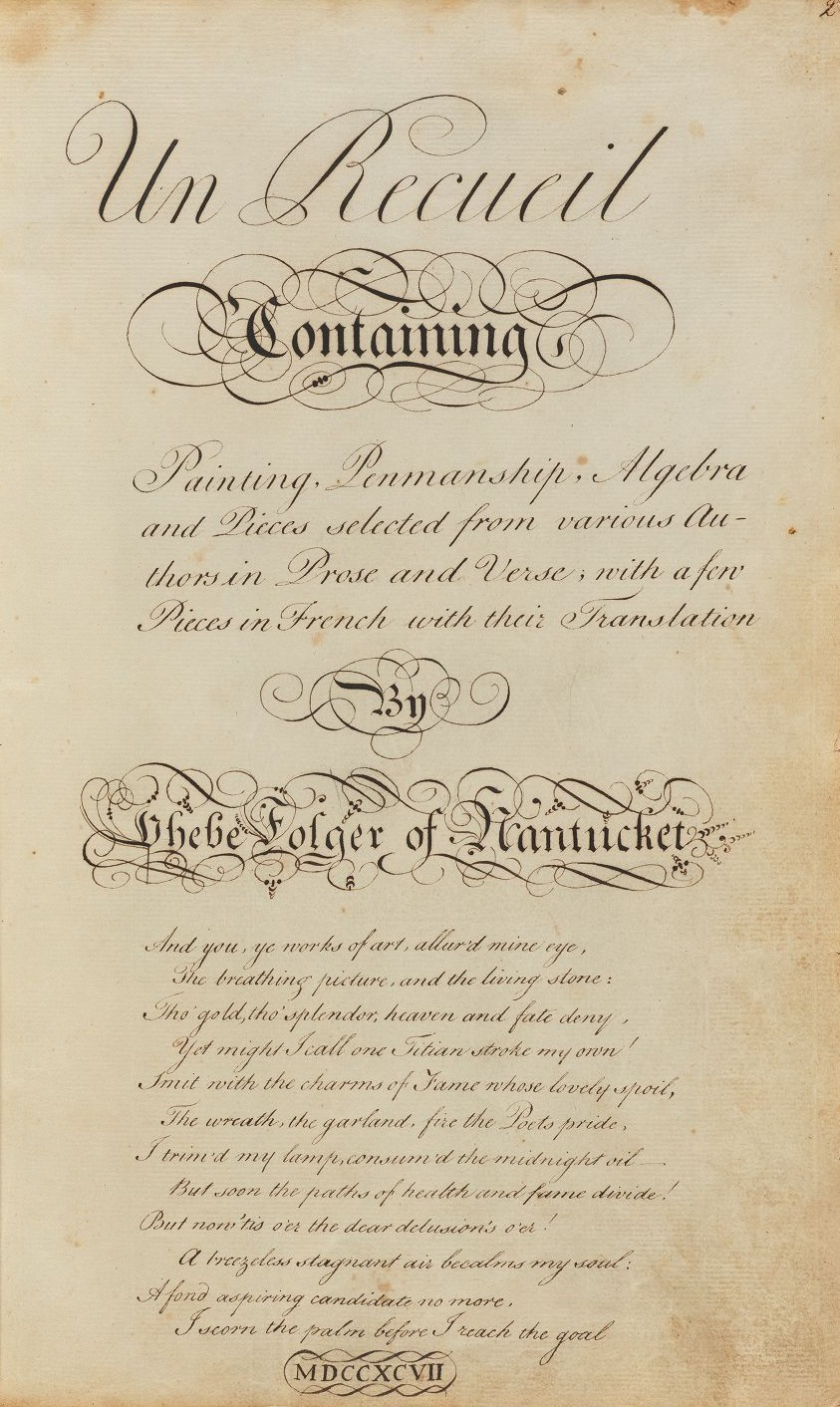
First page of the commonplace book of Phebe Folger Coleman, Houghton Library

Phebe Folger Coleman (November 10, 1771 - February 5, 1857) was an American diarist, poet, and watercolorist from Nantucket, Massachusetts.

== Biography ==
Phebe Folger was born in Nantucket, Massachusetts, to Walter and Elizabeth Starbuck Folger on November 10, 1771. She was the great-great-great granddaughter of Peter Foulger and Mary Morrill Folger and first cousin three times removed of Benjamin Franklin. Through her mother, she was also a member or the Starbuck whaling family of Nantucket. Her older brother, Walter Folger, Jr., was a legislator who also invented a type of astronomical clock, and taught her about science and other topics. Her niece Lydia Folger Fowler was the second woman to earn a medical degree in the United States. In 1797, Phebe Folger began a commonplace book she called Un Recueil and which included "Painting, Penmanship, Algebra" as well as prose and poetry, including literature she translated from French.

She married Samuel Coleman, a sailor and Quaker, in 1798. She taught him the mathematics and navigation she learned from her brother and, with his new knowledge, he became the captain of a ship. While he was away at sea, she supplemented the family income by keeping a school. Her letters to her husband often lament their separation: "[I] am willing to contribute my mite to accelerate that happy period when we shall not be obliged to separate" (1800) and, "I am very lonesome... thy absence grows more insupportable than it used to be... Why should so much of our time be spent apart?" (1808). After his death in 1828, she operated a local grist mill.

== Legacy ==
A collector named Philip Hofer purchased Coleman's commonplace book in the 20th century and donated it to the Houghton Library at Harvard University. The book has since been used by scholars to discover the lives of women whose husbands and families worked in maritime industries.
