= New York Society of Women Artists =

Artist society in New York, US

New York Society of Women Artists (NYSWA) is a group of women that aims to provide support and opportunities to New York-based female professional artists. The society was founded in 1925 by 26 women (23 painters and three sculptors). NYSWA organizes exhibitions and events featuring female artists living and working in New York only.

NYSWA was founded by ardent feminists involved in the Suffragist movement who were devoted to promoting avant-garde women artists by arranging shows of their work and raising the status of female artists. Anne Goldthwaite, a notable founding member of the New York Society of Women Artists, played a leading role in the Organizing Committee of the Exhibition of Painting and Sculpture by Women Artists for the Benefit of the Woman Suffrage Campaign held at Macbeth Gallery in New York City. "This is the first time there has been any concerted expression on the part of the women artists as to their attitude toward equal suffrage", reported the New York Evening Post in 1915.

The first officers of NYSWA included Marguerite Zorach, president; Anne Goldthwaite, vice-president, Ethel Meyers, treasurer; Ellen Ravenscroft, corresponding secretary and Ethel Paddock, recording secretary; Its membership included Theresa Bernstein, Lucile Blanch, Sonia Gordon Brown, Louise Upton Brumback, E. Varian Cockcroft, Gladys Roosevelt Dick, Elizabeth Grandin, Minna Harkavy, Margaret Huntington, Adelaide Lawson, Blanche Lazell, Lucy L'engle, Katherine Liddell, Marjorie Organ, Doris Rosenthal, Concetta Scaravaglione, Flora Schofield, Henrietta Shore, Mary Tannahill, Harriet Titlow, and Agnes Weinrich.

== Exhibitions ==
- Brooklyn Museum Exhibition: Paintings, Sculpture & Prints by the New York Society of Women Artists & the Society of Swedish Women Artists, 1931–1932
- The Primacy Of Color III, Carriage Barn Arts Center (June 2017)
- ART & SOUL, Prince Street Gallery (July 2018)
- Between The Lines, Blue Mountain Gallery (July 2019)
- Taller Boricua Gallery Exhibition (March 2021)
- Evolution/Revolution, Taller Boricua Gallery (May 2022)

== See also ==
- Society of Women Artists
