= Elisha Huntington =

American physician and politician (1796–1865)

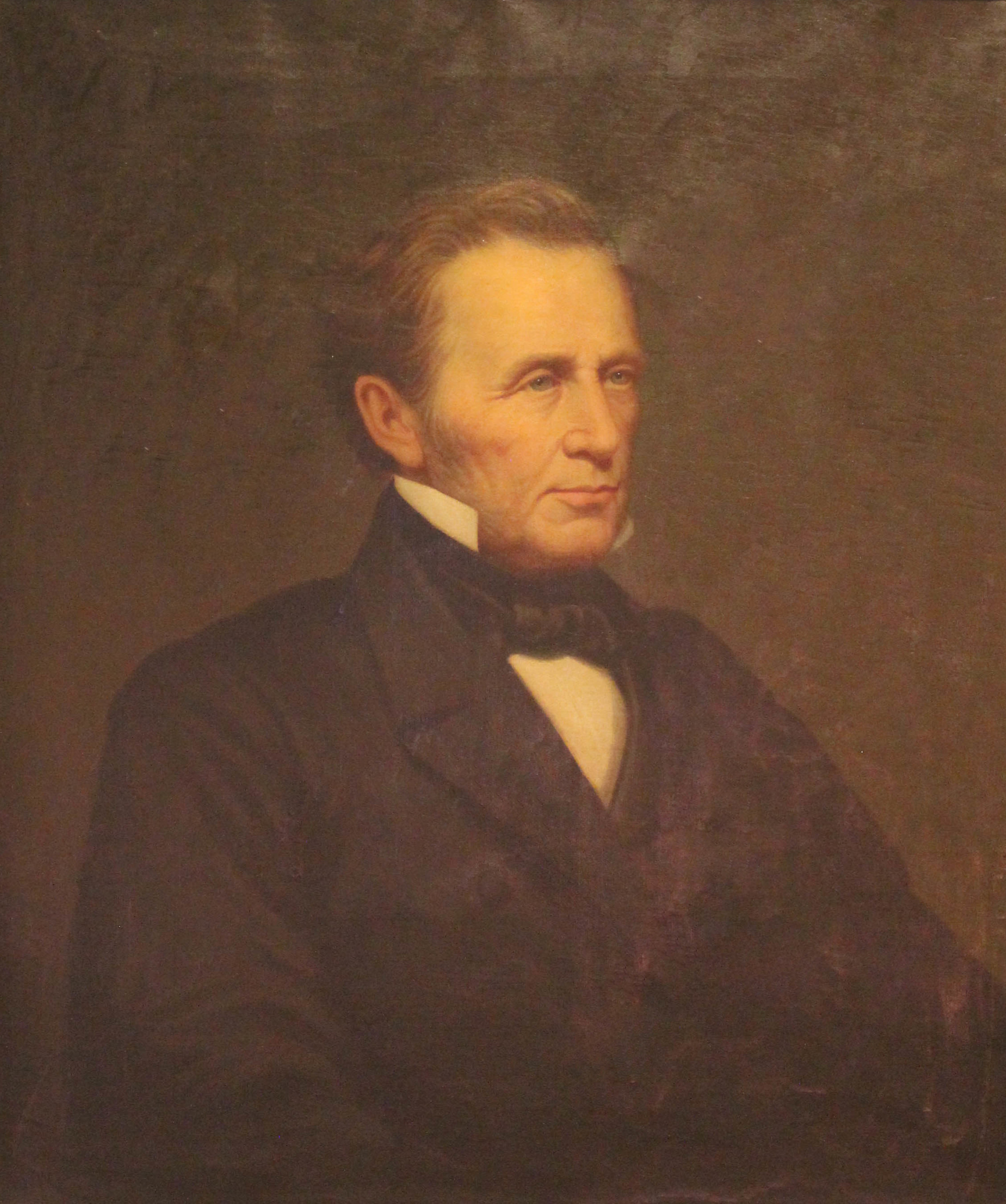

19th Lieutenant Governor of Massachusetts
- In office January 14, 1853 – January 12, 1854
- Governor: John H. Clifford
- Preceded by: Henry W. Cushman
- Succeeded by: William C. Plunkett

3rd Mayor of Lowell, Massachusetts
- In office April 1840 – April 1842
- Preceded by: Himself as Acting Mayor
- Succeeded by: Nathaniel Wright

5th Mayor of Lowell, Massachusetts
- In office April 1844 – January 1846
- Preceded by: Nathaniel Wright
- Succeeded by: Jefferson Bancroft

9th Mayor of Lowell, Massachusetts
- In office January 1852 – January 1853
- Preceded by: James H. B. Ayer
- Succeeded by: Sewall G. Mack

12th Mayor of Lowell, Massachusetts
- In office January 1856 – January 1857
- Preceded by: Ambrose Lawrence
- Succeeded by: Stephen Mansur

14th Mayor of Lowell, Massachusetts
- In office January 1858 – January 1859
- Preceded by: Stephen Mansur
- Succeeded by: James Cook

Acting Mayor of Lowell, Massachusetts
- In office 1839 – April 1840
- Preceded by: Luther Lawrence
- Succeeded by: Himself as 3rd Mayor

President of the Lowell, Massachusetts Common Council
- In office 1838–1839
- Preceded by: John Clark
- Succeeded by: Thomas Hopkinson

Member of the Lowell, Massachusetts Common Council Ward 3
- In office 1837–1839

Member of the Lowell, Massachusetts Board of Aldermen
- In office 1847–1847
- In office 1853–1854

Member of the Lowell, Massachusetts Board of Selectmen
- In office 1833–1834
- Preceded by: Joshua Crosby

Personal details
- Born: April 9, 1796
- Died: December 13, 1865 (aged 69) Lowell, Massachusetts
- Party: Whig
- Children: 5, including William Reed Huntington

Elisha Huntington (April 9, 1796 – December 13, 1865) was an American medical doctor and politician who served as the mayor of Lowell, Massachusetts and as the 19th lieutenant governor of Massachusetts from 1853 to 1854.

== Early life ==
Huntington was born in Topsfield, Massachusetts on July 23, 1798 to Rev. Asahel and Alethea (Lord) Huntington. Huntington was the brother of Salem, Massachusetts mayor Asahel Huntington.

He graduated from Dartmouth College in 1815 and from Yale Medical School in 1823. Commencing his professional life at Lowell in 1824, two years before the incorporation of the city, he was identified for the last quarter of a century with its growth and improvement, and was elected mayor eight times. In 1853 he was Lieutenant Governor of Massachusetts. He was also at one time president of the Massachusetts Medical Society, and from 1860 to 1865 an overseer of Harvard College. He was married in 1825 to Hannah Hinckley, of Marblehead, who died in 1859. They had five children, including William Reed Huntington.

This article incorporates public domain material from the Yale Obituary Record.

== Notes ==
Political offices
Preceded by Henry W. Cushman	Lieutenant Governor of Massachusetts; 1853–1854	Succeeded by William C. Plunkett
Preceded by Stephen Mansur	Mayor of Lowell, Massachusetts; January 1858 – January 1859	Succeeded by James Cook
Preceded by Ambrose Lawrence	Mayor of Lowell, Massachusetts; January 1856 – January 1857	Succeeded by Stephen Mansur
Preceded by James H. B. Ayer	Mayor of Lowell, Massachusetts; January 1852 – January 1853	Succeeded by Sewall G. Mack
Preceded by Nathaniel Wright	Mayor of Lowell, Massachusetts; April 1844 – January 1846	Succeeded by Jefferson Bancroft
Preceded by Luther Lawrence	Mayor of Lowell, Massachusetts; April 1840 – April 1842	Succeeded by Nathaniel Wright
Preceded by Luther Lawrence	Acting Mayor of Lowell, Massachusetts; 1839 – April 1840	Succeeded by Nathaniel Wright
Preceded by John Clark	President of the Lowell, Massachusetts Common Council; 1838–1839	Succeeded by Thomas Hopkinson
