= Nathaniel Wright =

American politician

4th Mayor of Lowell, MA
- In office 1842–1843
- Preceded by: Elisha Huntington
- Succeeded by: Elisha Huntington

Member of the Massachusetts Senate
- In office 1834–1834
- Succeeded by: John P. Robinson

Member of the Massachusetts House of Representatives
- In office 1827–1828

Chairman of the Lowell, Massachusetts Board of Selectmen
- In office 1827–1830

Member of the Lowell, Massachusetts Board of Selectmen
- In office 1827–1830
- Preceded by: None
- Succeeded by: James Tyler

Personal details
- Born: February 13, 1785 Sterling, Massachusetts
- Died: November 5, 1858 (aged 73) Lowell, Massachusetts
- Spouse: Laura Hoar
- Children: Nathaniel Wright, Jr.
- Education: Harvard; Class of 1808.
- Profession: Attorney

Nathaniel Wright (February 13, 1785 – November 5, 1858) was an American businessman and lawyer who was the fourth Mayor of Lowell, Massachusetts.

== Early life ==
Wright was born in Sterling, Massachusetts on February 13, 1785, the oldest son of Hon. Thomas and Eunice (Osgood) Wright.

== Family life ==
Wright married Laura Hoar on March 5, 1820.

== Business career ==
Wright was president of the Lowell Bank from its organization, June 2, 1828, until his resignation on October 2, 1858.

== Notes ==
Political offices
Preceded by Elisha Huntington	4th Mayor of Lowell, Massachusetts; April 1842 – April 1844	Succeeded by Elisha Huntington
