= Chicago–Lambeth Quadrilateral =

Four-point articulation of Anglican identity

The Chicago–Lambeth Quadrilateral, frequently referred to as the Lambeth Quadrilateral or the Lambeth–Chicago Quadrilateral, is a four-point articulation of Anglican identity, often cited as encapsulating the fundamentals of the Anglican Communion's doctrine and as a reference point for ecumenical discussion with other Christian denominations. The four points are:

1. The Holy Scriptures, as containing all things necessary to salvation;
2. The creeds (specifically, the Apostles' and Nicene Creeds), as the sufficient statement of Christian faith;
3. The dominical sacraments of baptism and Holy Communion;
4. The historic episcopate, locally adapted.

The quadrilateral had its genesis in an 1870 essay by the American Episcopal priest William Reed Huntington, and was officially adopted by the bishops of the Anglican Communion in 1888. The four elements were held to establish "a basis on which approach may be by God's blessing, made toward Home Reunion", that is, with the Catholic and Eastern Orthodox churches.

== American House of Bishops resolution ==
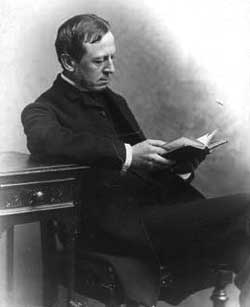
William Reed Huntington's essay was the basis of the quadrilateral.

The four points found their way into a resolution of the House of Bishops of the American Episcopal Church, meeting in Chicago in 1886. As passed there, the resolution reads as follows:

We, Bishops of the Protestant Episcopal Church in the United States of America, in Council assembled as Bishops in the Church of God, do hereby solemnly declare to all whom it may concern, and especially to our fellow-Christians of the different Communions in this land, who, in their several spheres, have contended for the religion of Christ:

1. Our earnest desire that the Savior's prayer, "That we all may be one," may, in its deepest and truest sense, be speedily fulfilled;
2. That we believe that all who have been duly baptized with water, in the name of the Father, and of the Son, and of the Holy Ghost, are members of the Holy Catholic Church.
3. That in all things of human ordering or human choice, relating to modes of worship and discipline, or to traditional customs, this Church is ready in the spirit of love and humility to forego all preferences of her own;
4. That this Church does not seek to absorb other Communions, but rather, co-operating with them on the basis of a common Faith and Order, to discountenance schism, to heal the wounds of the Body of Christ, and to promote the charity which is the chief of Christian graces and the visible manifestation of Christ to the world.

But furthermore, we do hereby affirm that the Christian unity can be restored only by the return of all Christian communions to the principles of unity exemplified by the undivided Catholic Church during the first ages of its existence; which principles we believe to be the substantial deposit of Christian Faith and Order committed by Christ and his Apostles to the Church unto the end of the world, and therefore incapable of compromise or surrender by those who have been ordained to be its stewards and trustees for the common and equal benefit of all men.

As inherent parts of this sacred deposit, and therefore as essential to the restoration of unity among the divided branches of Christendom, we account the following, to wit:

1. The Holy Scriptures of the Old and New Testaments as the revealed Word of God.
2. The Nicene Creed as the sufficient statement of the Christian Faith.
3. The two Sacraments – Baptism and the Supper of the Lord – ministered with unfailing use of Christ's words of institution and of the elements ordained by Him.
4. The Historic Episcopate, locally adapted in the methods of its administration to the varying needs of the nations and peoples called of God into the unity of His Church.

Furthermore, Deeply grieved by the sad divisions which affect the Christian Church in our own land, we hereby declare our desire and readiness, so soon as there shall be any authorized response to this Declaration, to enter into brotherly conference with all or any Christian Bodies seeking the restoration of the organic unity of the Church, with a view to the earnest study of the conditions under which so priceless a blessing might happily be brought to pass.

== Lambeth Conference resolution ==
In 1888, the third Lambeth Conference (an international consultation of bishops of the Anglican Communion) passed Resolution 11. This was a scaled-back version of the resolution passed at Chicago two years earlier, more closely aligned with Huntington's original wording, and reads as follows:

That, in the opinion of this Conference, the following Articles supply a basis on which approach may be by God's blessing made towards Home Reunion:

1. The Holy Scriptures of the Old and New Testaments, as "containing all things necessary to salvation," and as being the rule and ultimate standard of faith.
2. The Apostles' Creed, as the Baptismal Symbol; and the Nicene Creed, as the sufficient statement of the Christian faith.
3. The two Sacraments ordained by Christ Himself – Baptism and the Supper of the Lord – ministered with unfailing use of Christ's words of Institution, and of the elements ordained by Him.
4. The Historic Episcopate, locally adapted in the methods of its administration to the varying needs of the nations and peoples called of God into the Unity of His Church.

== The 1920 Appeal to all Christian People ==
The 1920 Lambeth Conference picked up and reiterated the points of the earlier documents in fresh language. The rewording of the fourth was radical:

A ministry acknowledged by every part of the Church as possessing not only the inward call of the Spirit, but also the commission of Christ and the authority of the whole body.

The episcopate was only expressly mentioned in the commentary which followed:

May we not reasonably claim that the Episcopate is the one means of providing such a ministry? It is not that we call in question for a moment the spiritual reality of the ministries of those Communions which do not possess the Episcopate. On the contrary, we thankfully acknowledge that these ministries have been manifestly blessed and owned by the Holy Spirit as effective means of grace ...

According to Michael Ramsey this conciliatory presentation aroused a great readiness to discuss reunion, but later declarations were more qualified and therefore frustrating for free churchmen.

== Significance of the quadrilateral ==
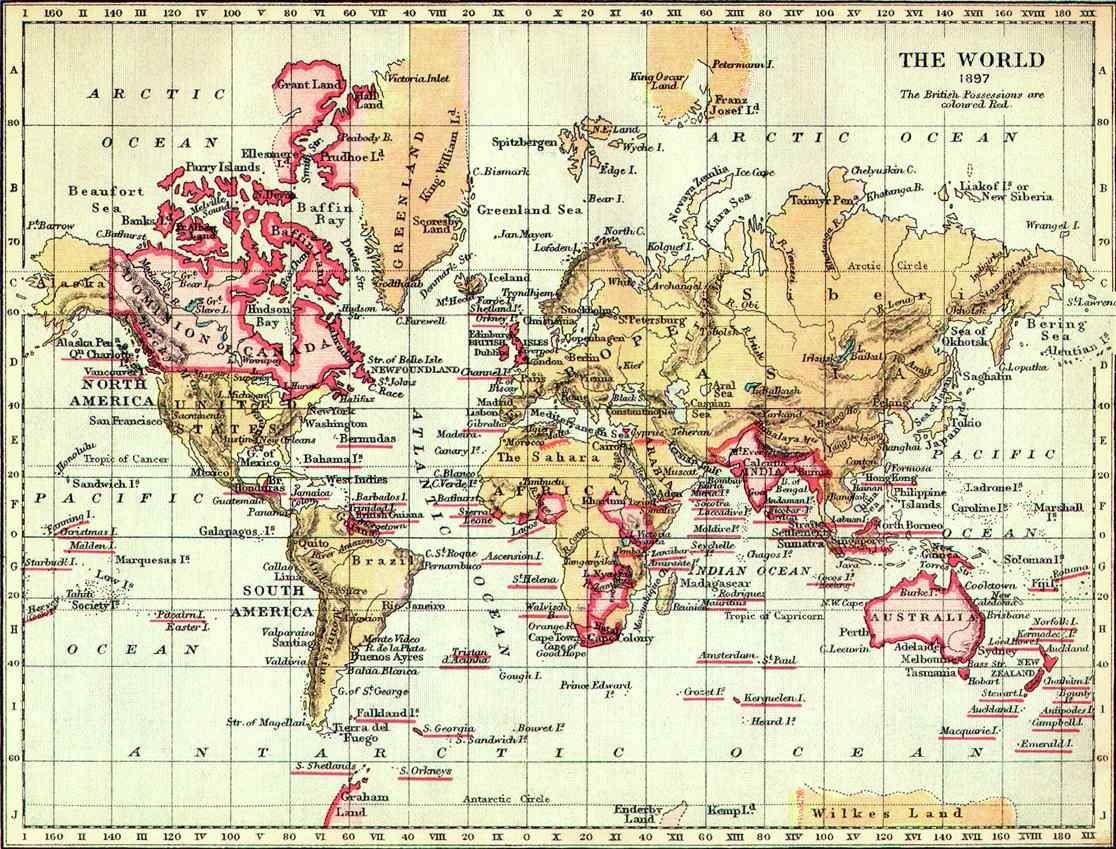
The Anglican Communion was growing throughout the British Empire, marked in pink, in the late 19th century.

The quadrilateral has had a significant impact on Anglican identity since its passage by the Lambeth Conference. The resolution came at a time of rapid expansion of the Anglican Communion, primarily in the territories of the British Empire. As such, it provided a basis for a shared ethos, one that became increasingly important as colonial churches influenced by British culture and values, evolved into national ones influenced by local norms. At the same time, it has been the locus of fervent debate, especially over its third and fourth points.

The first point, concerning what Anglicans call "the sufficiency of Scripture", takes its language directly from Article VI of the Thirty-Nine Articles, foundational to Anglican scriptural exegesis and hermeneutics since the sixteenth century. As such, it has been widely accepted as written. Similarly, the second point describes the sine qua non of catholic faith since antiquity, and so likewise has enjoyed broad acquiescence. To the extent that it has been controversial, the controversy has centered entirely on those parts of the Communion that have sought to expand a sufficient statement of faith to include other formulae. The third point has been controversial among some Anglicans as being inappropriately limited. In particular, many Anglo-Catholics have maintained that the five other sacraments should be included as essential marks of the Church (see Anglican sacraments). By far, the most controversial point has been the fourth, which many believe could open the door to challenging the Church's episcopal tradition of apostolic succession.

== The quadrilateral in ecumenical dialogue ==
The Chicago-Lambeth Quadrilateral has also been important to ecumenical dialogue. In this context, it had been helpful in consultations between the Anglican and Roman Catholic communions and between certain Anglican ecclesiastical provinces and national Lutheran organizations.

Apostolicae curae is the title of a papal bull issued in 1896 by Pope Leo XIII declaring all Anglican ordinations to be "absolutely null and utterly void". It has been described as an early Roman Catholic response to the ecumenical efforts of the Chicago-Lambeth Quadrilateral. This papal bull was in turn responded to by "Saepius officio" written by the then Archbishops of Canterbury and York, Frederick Temple and William Maclagan.

The quadrilateral has also proved a stumbling block, however, as in the discussions between the Anglican Church of Canada and the United Church of Canada, between the Church of England and the Methodist Church of Great Britain, and between the Church of England and other free churches, all of which broke down largely due to the issue of episcopacy.

== See also ==
- Anglican Communion and ecumenism
- Four marks of the church
