= William Reed Huntington =

American Episcopal priest and author (1838–1909)

The Reverend Father William Reed Huntington D.D., D.C.L., L.H.D.
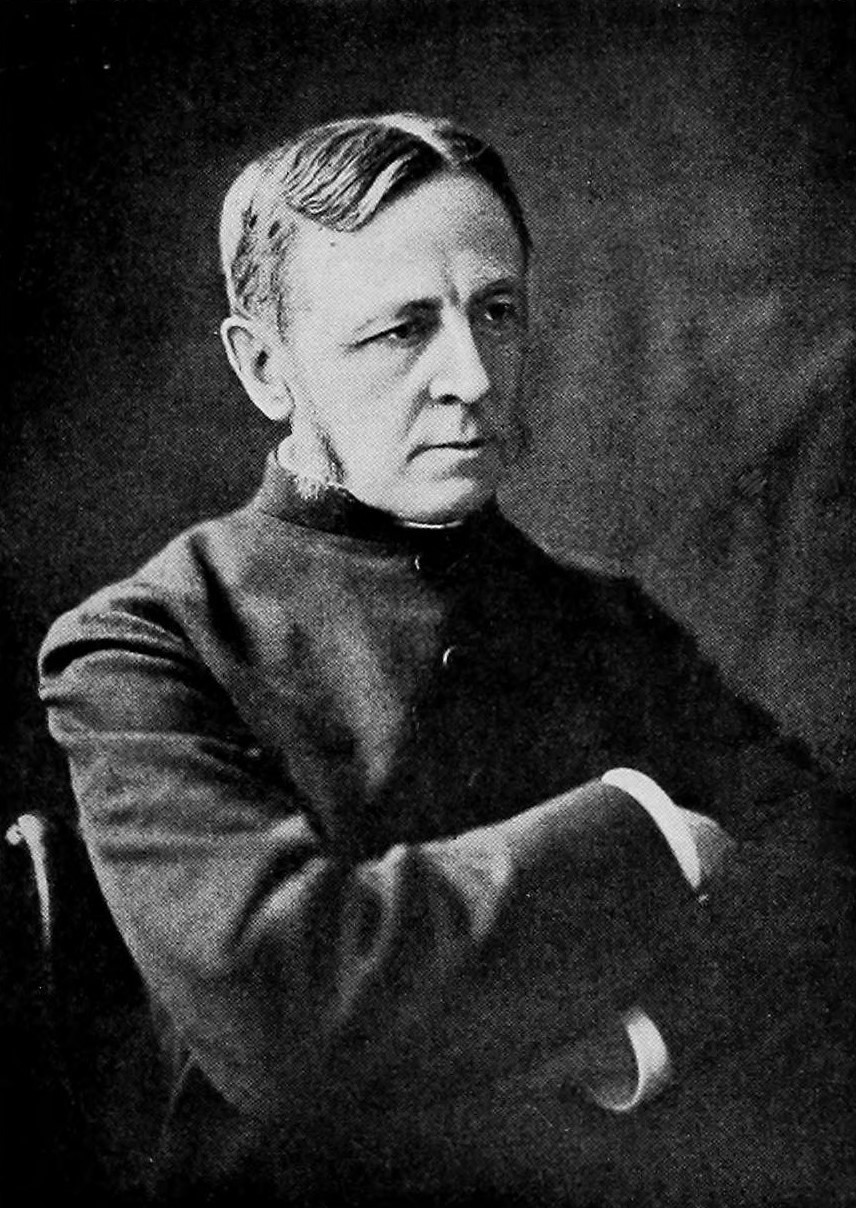

6th Rector of Grace Church Manhattan, New York City
- In office 1883–1909
- Preceded by: Henry Codman Potter
- Succeeded by: Charles Lewis Slattery

Rector of All Saints Church Worcester, Massachusetts
- In office 1862–1883
- Succeeded by: Alexander Hamilton Vinton

Assistant Rector of Emmanuel Episcopal Church, Boston
- In office 1860–1862

Personal life
- Born: September 20, 1838 Lowell, Massachusetts
- Died: July 26, 1909 (aged 70) Nahant, Massachusetts
- Spouse: Theresa Reynolds (m. 1863; died 1872)
- Education: Harvard University
- Relatives: Elisha Huntington (father); Asahel Huntington (uncle)

Religious life
- Religion: Christian
- Church: Episcopal Church
- Ordination: October 1, 1861 (deacon); December 3, 1862 (priest)

William Reed Huntington (September 20, 1838 – July 26, 1909) was an American Episcopal priest and author, and known as the "First Presbyter of the Episcopal Church."

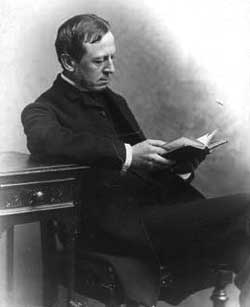
William Reed Huntington

== Life ==
Huntington was born September 20, 1838, in Lowell, Massachusetts. He was the son of Elisha Huntington and Hannah Hinckley. He was also descendant of Christopher Huntington, one of the founders of Norwich, Connecticut He began his education at Norwich University at Alden Partridge's military college in Norwich, Vermont, and eventually transferred and graduated from Harvard College in 1859 and in 1859–1860 taught as Assistant in Chemistry to Professor Josiah Parsons Cooke. Huntington studied theology under Frederick Dan Huntington and served as his assistant at Emmanuel Church in Boston, Massachusetts. Huntington was ordained deacon on October 1, 1861, and priest on December 3, 1862. Entering the Episcopal ministry, he was rector of All Saints Church, Worcester, Massachusetts, in 1862–1883 and of Grace Church in Manhattan, New York from 1883 until his death.

Huntington always took a prominent part in public affairs. He was active in the movement for liturgical revisions and was secretary of the Prayer-Book Revisions Committee, and editor with Samuel Hart of the Standard Prayer-Book of 1892. The 1892 General Convention adopted his proposal to set the Apostles' and Nicene Creeds as the confession of faith. Huntington was elected a member of the American Antiquarian Society in 1875.

In October, 1863, Huntington married Theresa Reynolds, granddaughter of John Phillips, the first Mayor of Boston, and niece of Wendell Phillips. Together they had four children: Francis, Margaret, Theresa, and Mary. Reynolds died in 1872. Huntington died July 26, 1909, in Nahant, Massachusetts.

== Works ==
The Chicago-Lambeth Quadrilateral had its genesis in an 1870 essay by Huntington. In The Church Idea, an Essay toward Unity Huntington's goal was to establish "a basis on which approach may be by God's blessing, made toward Home Reunion," i.e., with the Roman Catholic and Eastern Orthodox Churches. The Quadrilateral is a four-point articulation of Anglican identity, often cited as encapsulating the fundamentals of the Communion's doctrine and as a reference-point for ecumenical discussion with other Christian denominations. The four points are:

1. The Holy Scriptures, as containing all things necessary to salvation;
2. The Creeds (specifically, the Apostles' and Nicene Creeds), as the sufficient statement of Christian faith;
3. The dominical sacraments of Baptism and Holy Communion;
4. The historic episcopate, locally adapted.

The Quadrilateral has had a significant impact on Anglican identity since its passage by the Lambeth Conference. The Resolution came at a time of rapid expansion of the Anglican Communion, primarily in the territories of the British Empire. As such, it provided a basis for a shared ethos, one that became increasingly important as colonial churches influenced by British culture and values, evolved into national ones influenced by local norms.

Huntington also wrote:

- Conditional Immortality (1878)
- The Book Annexed: Its Critics and its Prospects (1886)
- Short History of the Book of Common Prayer (1893)
- A National Church (1898)
- Sonnets and a Dream. Jamaica, Queensborough, New York: The Marion Press, 1899.
- A Good Shepherd and Other Sermons (1906)

In 1907, he published Tract 91: The Articles of Religion from an American Point of View. Its title was a reference to John Henry Newman's Tract 90, which had also attempted a reinterpretation of the Thirty-Nine Articles. The New York Times called the book "an anachronism at the present day."

== Honors ==
Huntington received honorary Doctor of Divinity (D.D.) degrees from Columbia University, Princeton University, and Harvard University. He also received a Doctor of Civil Law (D.C.L.) degree from the University of the South and a Doctor of Humane Letters (L.H.D.) from Hobart College.

== Veneration ==
Huntington is honored with a feast day on the liturgical calendar of the Episcopal Church (USA) on July 27.
