= Henry W. Cushman =

American politician

Henry Wyles Cushman
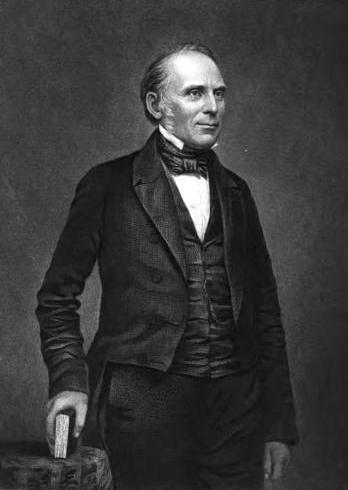

18th Lieutenant Governor of Massachusetts
- In office January 11, 1851 – January 14, 1853
- Governor: George S. Boutwell
- Preceded by: John Reed, Jr.
- Succeeded by: Elisha Huntington

Member of the Massachusetts State Senate
- In office 1844–1844
- Preceded by: William Whitaker

Member of the Massachusetts House of Representatives
- In office 1844–1844

Member of the Massachusetts House of Representatives
- In office 1839–1840

Member of the Massachusetts House of Representatives
- In office 1837–1837

Personal details
- Born: August 9, 1805 Bernardston, Massachusetts
- Died: November 21, 1863 (aged 58) Bernardston, Massachusetts
- Party: Democratic
- Spouse(s): Maria Louisa Dickman, m. June 16, 1828, died October 11, 1855; Anne Williams Fettyplace, m. June 2, 1858
- Profession: politician
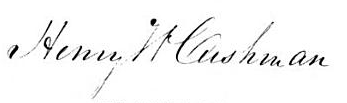
- Signature

Henry Wyles Cushman (August 9, 1805 – November 21, 1863) was an American politician who served both branches of the Massachusetts General Court and as the 18th lieutenant governor of Massachusetts from 1851 to 1853.

== Early life ==
Cushman was born to Polycarpus L. and Salley (Wyles) Cushman on August 9, 1805, in Bernardston, Massachusetts,

He worked as a teacher, farmer, and public house manager.

== Public service ==
Cushman was a delegate to the Massachusetts Constitutional Convention of 1853. He was elected a member of the American Antiquarian Society in 1862.

Political offices
Preceded by John Reed, Jr.	Lieutenant Governor of Massachusetts; 1851 – 1853	Succeeded by Elisha Huntington
