= Asahel Huntington =

American politician

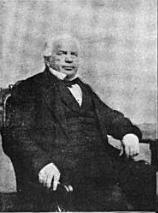

^{8th} Mayor of Salem, Massachusetts
- In office March 1853 – March 1854
- Preceded by: Charles Wentworth Upham
- Succeeded by: Joseph Andrews

District attorney for Essex County, Massachusetts
- In office 1848–1851
- Preceded by: Albert H. Nelson (as Northern District attorney)
- Succeeded by: Stephen Henry Phillips
- In office 1830–1832
- Preceded by: Stephen Minot
- Succeeded by: Himself (as Northern District attorney)

District Attorney for the Northern District of Massachusetts
- In office 1832–1845
- Preceded by: Himself (in Essex County); Asahel Stearns (in Middlesex County)
- Succeeded by: Albert H. Nelson

Personal details
- Born: July 28, 1798 Topsfield, Massachusetts, U.S.
- Died: September 5, 1870
- Spouse(s): Caroline Louisa (De Blois) Tucker, m. August 1842.
- Children: William De Blois Huntington; Sarah Louisa Huntington; Arthur Lord Huntington
- Education: Phillips Academy, class of 1815. Yale College, class of 1819.
- Profession

Asahel Huntington (July 28, 1798 – September 5, 1870) was an American politician who served as a Mayor of Salem, Massachusetts.

Huntington was born in Topsfield, Massachusetts on July 23, 1798. His father was the Rev. Asahel Huntington, and his mother was Alethea, daughter of Dr. Elisha Lord, of Pomfret, Connecticut. Huntington was the brother of Massachusetts Lieutenant Governor Elisha Huntington.

Huntington graduated from Yale College in 1819. After leaving College, Huntington commenced his legal studies at Newburyport, and after some interruptions completed them at Salem, Mass., where he was admitted to the bar in 1824. He continued in practice in Salem until 1851, when he was appointed clerk of all the courts in Essex County; this office he held till his death. He served the State repeatedly in the Massachusetts Legislature, and in the Massachusetts Constitutional Convention of 1853, and in the same year was mayor of the city of Salem. He was also a longtime member of the Salem school board. He died in Salem on September 5, 1870, after a brief illness.

On August 15, 1842, he married Caroline (Deblois) Tucker, of Boston, who survived him, with a son and daughter.

This article incorporates public domain material from the Yale Obituary Record.

Political offices
Preceded by Charles Wentworth Upham	Mayor of Salem, Massachusetts; 1853–1854	Succeeded by Joseph Andrews
