= Claudio Castelucho =

Spanish painter (1870–1927)

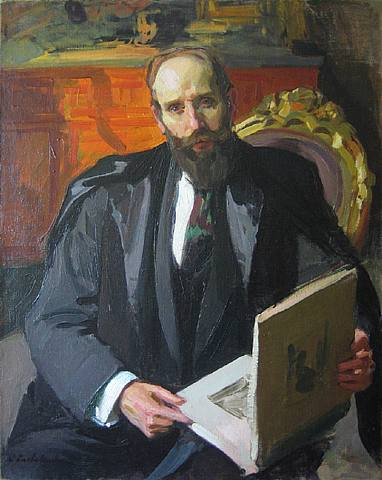
Self-portrait ("L'Amateur", 1907)

Claudio Castelucho y Diana (5 July 1870 in Barcelona – 31 October 1927 in Paris) was a Spanish sculptor, painter and art teacher from Catalonia who lived in France.

== Biography ==
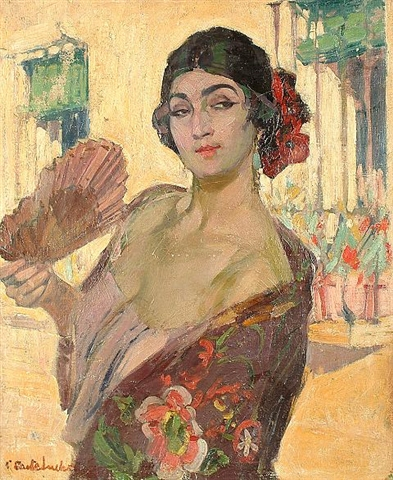
Flamenco Dancer (c.1905)

His father, Antoni Castelucho Vendrell, was a stage designer. Claudio received his first lessons from him and also collaborated on several artistic treatises dealing with the theory of perspective. He also began participating in exhibitions when he was barely out of his teens. In 1892, after some brief studies at the "Escuela de Bellas Artes de Barcelona", he moved to Paris with his family.

During his first years there, he worked together with his father and younger brother as a decorator and began painting landscapes in his spare time. He had his French début at the Salon of 1897 with those works. His paintings on Spanish themes proved to be the most popular, so he concentrated on producing more of them.

He began as a Professor at the Académie Colarossi and, in 1905, became one of the first group of Professors at the Académie de la Grande Chaumière, founded by Alice Dannenberg and Martha Stettler. As a teacher, he became very popular, especially among foreign artists studying in Paris. His students included Kathleen O'Connor (Australia), Edwin Holgate (Canada), Adolphe Milich (Poland), Mary Riter Hamilton (Canada), and Alice Pike Barney and Ellen Ravenscroft (USA).

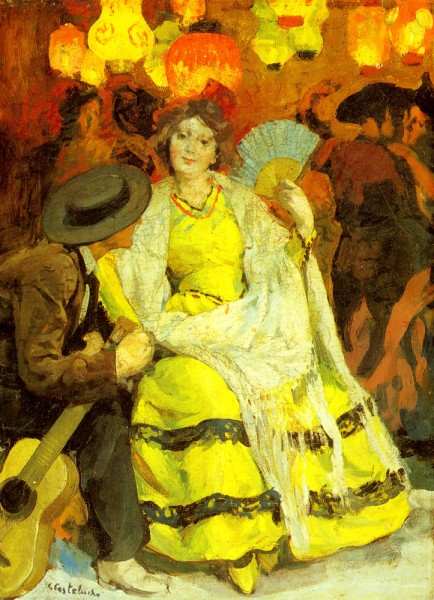
Listening to Music (1900s)

In 1913, he held a major exhibition at the Galerie Moos, a venue for modernist art in Geneva, where he presented some of his Spanish paintings from a brief visit home in 1910. Except for another short trip home at the beginning of World War I, he would remain in Paris for the rest of his life and continue to be a regular participant in the Salon.

=== Writings, with his father ===
- Tratado completo de Perspectiva aplicada á las bellas artes y artes industriales; Henrich & Co., 1891
- Escenografia Teatral: Aplicación de la perspectiva a la decoración escénica del Teatro, operando por el aumento visual de la planta de la escena; Henrich & Co., 1896
