= Walter Folger Jr. =

American politician (1765–1849)

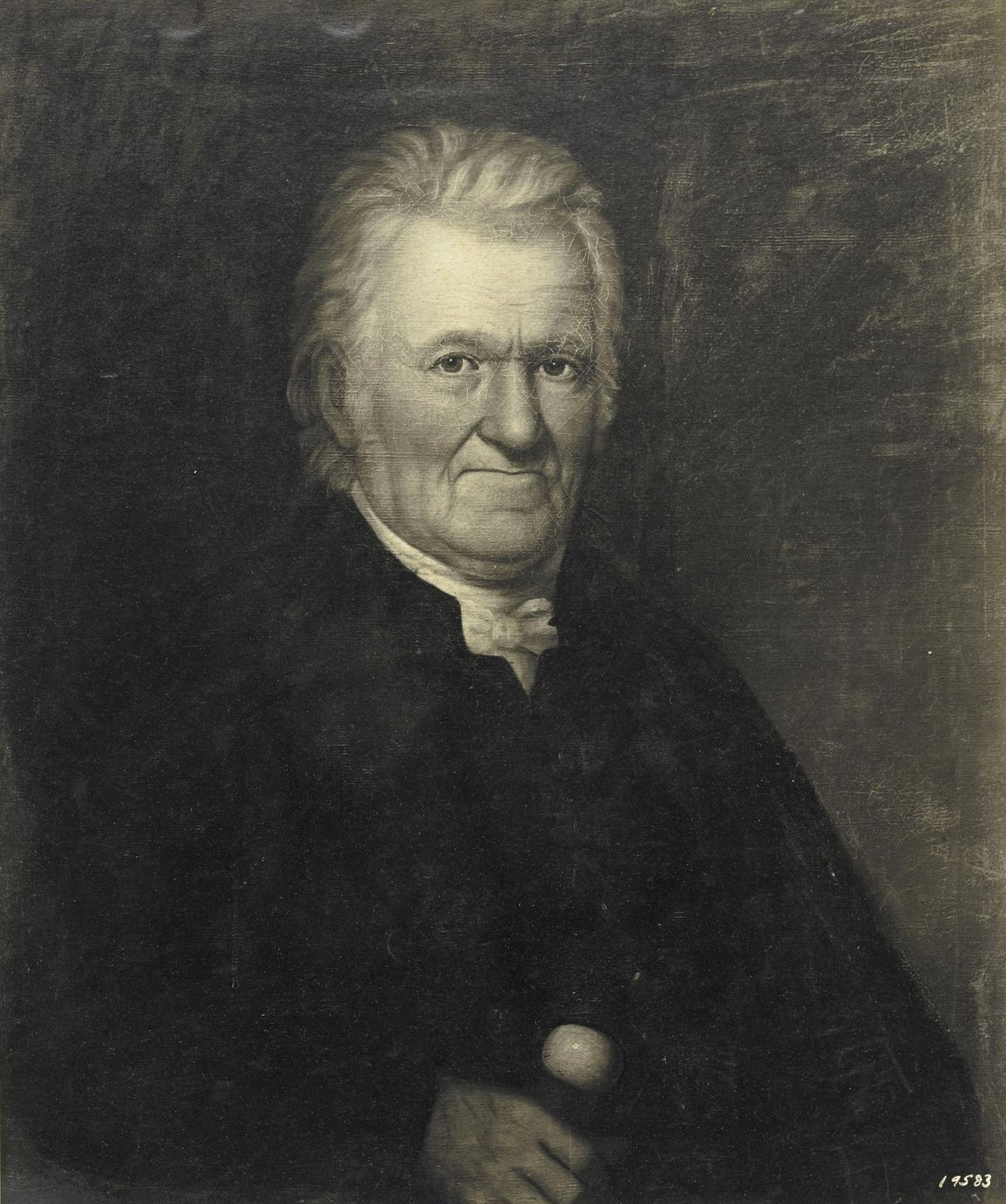

Member of the U.S. House of Representatives from Massachusetts's 9th district
- In office March 4, 1817 – March 3, 1821
- Preceded by: John Reed Jr.
- Succeeded by: John Reed Jr.

Member of the Massachusetts Senate
- In office 1809-1815

Personal details
- Born: June 12, 1765 Nantucket, Province of Massachusetts Bay, British America
- Died: September 8, 1849 (aged 84) Nantucket, Massachusetts, U.S.
- Party: Democratic-Republican
- Relations: Phebe Folger Coleman (sister); Lydia Folger Fowler (niece)
- Parent(s): Walter Folger Sr. Elizabeth Starbuck Folger
- Profession: Attorney

Walter Folger Jr. (June 12, 1765 – September 8, 1849) was a U.S. representative from Massachusetts.

== Biography ==
Born in Nantucket in the Province of Massachusetts Bay, Folger was a member of a large family that included his sister, diarist Phebe Folger Coleman. Notably he was the great-great-great grandson of Peter Folger and Mary Morrell Folger and first cousin three times removed of Benjamin Franklin. Through his mother he is also a member or the Starbuck whaling family of Nantucket.

He attended public schools before studying law. He was admitted to the bar and practiced before serving as member of the Massachusetts State Senate. Folger was elected as a Democratic-Republican to the Fifteenth Congress and reelected to the Sixteenth Congress (March 4, 1817 – March 3, 1821). He resumed the practice of law, and died in Nantucket on September 8, 1849. He was interred in Friends Burying Ground.

U.S. House of Representatives
Preceded by John Reed Jr.	Member of the U.S. House of Representatives from Massachusetts's 9th congressional district March 4, 1817 – March 3, 1821	Succeeded by John Reed Jr.
