= National Colonization =

National Colonization can refer to:

- Colonization Societies to repatriate slaves, including National Colonization Society of America
- A plan implemented by Australia's National Colonization Society; see History of South Australia
- The General Colonization Law, part of the 1824 Constitution of Mexico for claiming land in Mexican Texas for Mexico

== See also ==
- Colonization
