= Colonization societies =

A number of colonization societies which promoted the migration of African Americans to Africa have existed in the United States. Thomas Jefferson was a Founding Father who promoted the racial separation of Native Americans and the colonization of African Americans to places far away from Virginia. Jefferson was the most important early advocate of colonization. The Reverend Samuel Hopkins of Newport appears to have originated the idea of colonization in 1770.

== List of colonization societies ==
- Sierra Leone Company
- Maryland State Colonization Society
- African Colonization Society, (1800–1816) Based in the state of Virginia, perhaps at Richmond
- American Colonization Society (1817–onwards) Somehow, it became intermingled with the National Colonization Society. Samuel John Mills (1783–1818) was the founder, in conjunction with Dr. Finley
- International Migration Society (1894–1899), founded at the behest of Bishop Henry McNeil Turner. The IMS successfully transported three ships of African American migrants to Liberia.
- Liberia Exodus Joint Stock Steamship Company (1877–1880), sent one ship, the Azor, to Liberia at the behest of Martin Delany.
- The National Colonization Society of America, (Founded at Washington, D.C., December, 1816–onwards) The most successful group, it became a nationwide organization which involved many well-known Americans. See: American Colonization Society
- New York Colonization Society ( ? – ? ) A group that was active in Liberia in the 1890s.
- United Trans-Atlantic Society (1885–1887) formed in Kansas City at the behest of Benjamin "Pap" Singleton.

== See also ==
- American Colonization Society
- Ralph Randolph Gurley
- William Jay

== Publications ==
- Wilson, The History of the Rise and Fall of the Slave Power in America, Volume 1, (Boston, 1875)
- Alexander, A History of Colonization on the Western Coast of Africa (Philadelphia, 1846)
- Garrison, Thoughts on Colonization, (Boston, 1832)
- Birney, Letter on Colonization (New York, 1834)
- Jay (son of John Jay), An Inquiry into the Character and Tendency of the American Colonization and Antislavery Societies (New York, 1834)
