= James R. Osgood =

American publisher

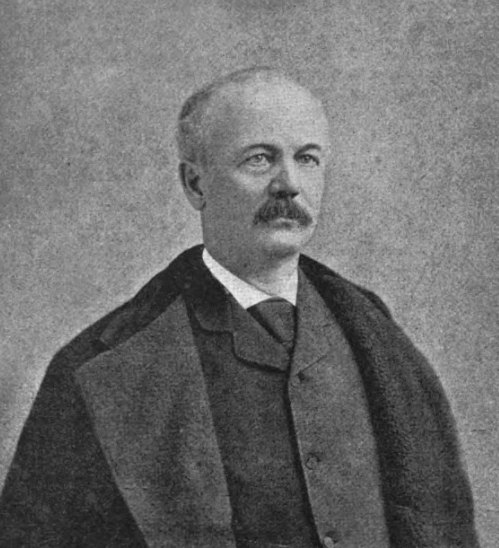
- Born: James Ripley Osgood; February 22, 1836; Fryeburg, Maine, US
- Died: May 18, 1892 (aged 56); London, England
- Burial place: Kensal Green Cemetery
- Education: Bowdoin College
- Occupation: Publisher

James Ripley Osgood (1836–1892) was an American publisher in Boston. He was involved with the publishing company that became Houghton Mifflin.

== Life and work ==
James Ripley Osgood was born in Fryeburg, Maine, on February 22, 1836. A reputed child prodigy, he knew Latin at the age of three and entered college at 12 years of age. He studied at Bowdoin College in Maine, graduating Phi Beta Kappa in 1854. While there, he was a member of the Peucinian Society among others.

He entered the publishing trade as a clerk in the Boston firm Ticknor and Fields and, by 1864, became a partner. It was reorganized in 1868 as Fields, Osgood, and Company. In 1869, the firm published abolitionist writer Harriet Beecher-Stowe's comedy-drama novel, Oldtown Folks.

The firm inherited The Atlantic Monthly, as did James R. Osgood and Company, the firm created by Osgood and two remaining partners after Fields retired on New Year's Day 1871. In an 1877 advertisement, James R. Osgood and Company are listed as the publishers of the weekly The American Architect and Building News, with the location listed as Winthrop Square (220 Devonshire Street).

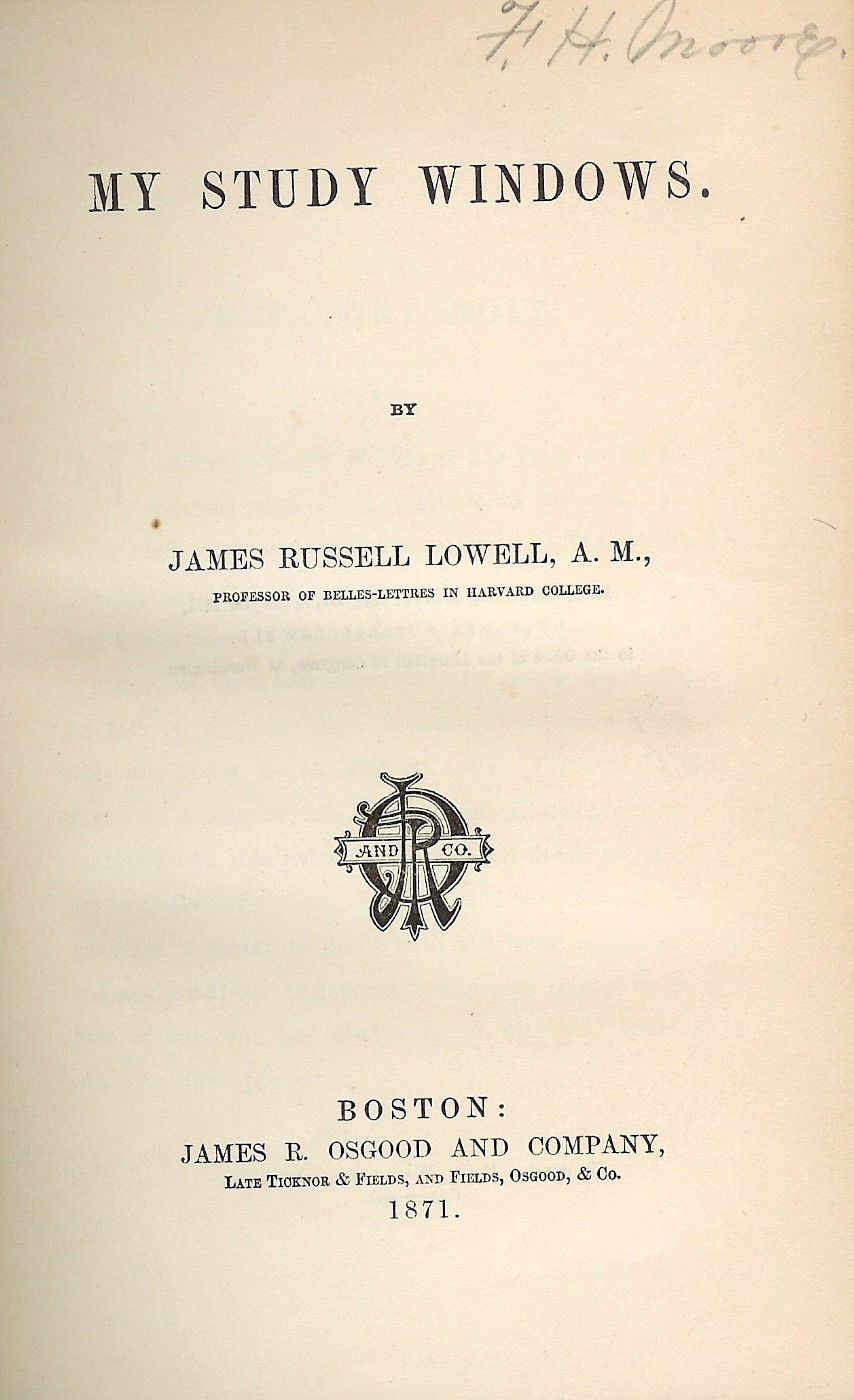
Title page of an 1871 book showing the James R. Osgood & Co. logo and imprint (second line: "late Ticknor & Fields, and Fields, Osgood, & Co.")

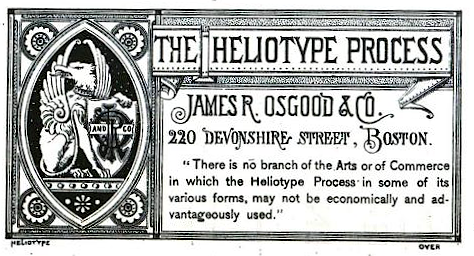
Advertisement, Boston Almanac, 1876

Successful book publications by Osgood & Co. included Bret Harte's The Luck of Roaring Camp and Other Stories, followed by a volume of Harte's poems and another of "condensed novels". Osgood advanced Bret Harte $10,000 for future work, but Harte never wrote another story. In 1875, Osgood published Blanche Willis Howard's One Summer, which became a best-selling novel.

In 1872 and 1877, Osgood & Co. brought out Henry Wilson's three-volume account of the Civil War, The History of the Rise and Fall of the Slave Power in America. Also in 1877 the firm sold the North American Review and published an edition of Edward FitzGerald's Rubaiyat of Omar Khayyam.

In 1878 the firm dissolved, and Osgood joined forces with Henry Oscar Houghton to form the short-lived Houghton, Osgood & Company. The firm's most successful book was William Dean Howells' The Lady of the Aroostook. In 1880 this firm became the New York branch of Houghton, Mifflin and Company. Osgood remained in Boston, where he founded a second publisher named James R. Osgood and Company.

The second Osgood company published an edition of Walt Whitman's Leaves of Grass in 1881 that was attacked by the Boston district attorney Oliver Stevens as "obscene literature". Osgood gave in to criticism and refused to bring out another edition, forcing Whitman to find another publisher.

By this time Osgood had befriended Samuel L. Clemens, whose pen name was "Mark Twain". In 1882 the company published Twain's The Prince and the Pauper and The Stolen White Elephant. That same year, Osgood accompanied Clemens on a riverboat trip collecting material for Life on the Mississippi, which was published by Osgood in 1883.

Osgood's firm was reportedly one of the most successful in Boston. However, in 1885 the company went bankrupt. Osgood's young partners, Thomas and Benjamin Ticknor, found a third partner and started a new firm. Osgood went to work for Harper's Magazine. In 1891 Osgood went into business again, with the magazine's permission, in partnership in London with Clarence McIlvaine as James R. Osgood, McIlvaine and Company. The firm had its greatest success with Thomas Hardy's Tess of the D'Urbervilles; Osgood saw its initial three volume publication in 1891, but died in London May 18, 1892, before its publication as a single volume later that year. He is buried in Kensal Green Cemetery, Kensington, England.

== In fiction ==
A fictionalized Osgood played a key role in Matthew Pearl's 2009 historical thriller The Last Dickens.
