= Blanche Willis Howard =

American novelist (1847–1898)

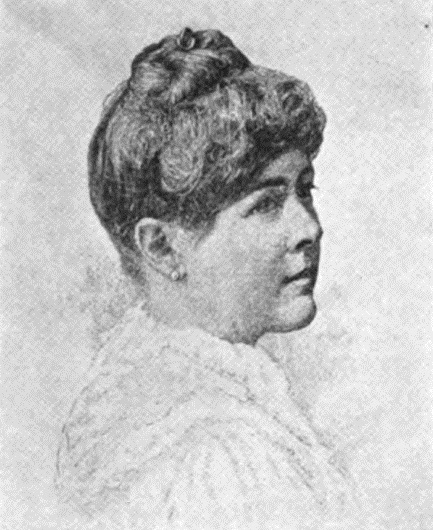
- Born: July 20, 1847; Bangor, Maine, United States
- Died: October 7, 1898 (aged 51); Munich, Germany
- Other names: Blanche Willis Howard von Teuffel
- Occupation: writer
- Known for: genre of Sentimentalism to Realism to the New Woman
- Notable work: One Summer
- Spouse: Baron Julius von Teuffel (m. 1890)

Blanche Willis Howard (July 20, 1847 – October 7, 1898) (married name: Blanche Willis Howard von Teuffel) was an American writer whose novels developed out of the genre of Sentimentalism to Realism to the New Woman. Her first novel, One Summer, and subsequent novels received critical praise. Howard lived most of her productive years in Stuttgart, Germany. She died in Munich, Germany, after a short illness.

== Early years ==
Howard was born and raised in Bangor, Maine. Her father was in the insurance industry and her mother came from a mercantile family. She had three siblings. After graduating from Bangor High School, she boarded at a New York City school where she developed her musical talents. She then lived for a year in Chicago with her sister Marion Howard Smith, who was married to Benjamin Fuller Smith, a son of former Maine Governor Samuel E. Smith.

== Career ==
Howard gained success with her first novel, One Summer (Boston, 1875), set in the coastal town Edgecomb, Maine, which is located near Wiscasset, Maine, the home of her married sister Marion's family. An 1877 edition of One Summer was illustrated by Augustus Hoppin. The publisher of One Summer was James R. Osgood, who began his career with Ticknor and Fields and later was in partnership with Henry Houghton. Osgood would be her most important publishing contact for much of her career.

Following publication of One Summer, Howard went to Europe, having received an assignment from the Boston Evening Transcript for a series of articles. Her articles were subsequently published as the travel book One Year Abroad (Boston, 1877).

Howard settled in Stuttgart, Germany and continued to write, producing novels, short fiction, poems, and essays. For two years, she was editor of Hallberger's Illustrated Magazine, an English-language magazine first edited by the German poet Ferdinand Freiligrath and funded by the publishing firm directed by Eduard Hallberger.

To supplement her income, Howard supervised the education of American girls in Stuttgart. Among her students were the three daughters of the actor Lawrence Barrett and the two daughters of Harriet Hubbard Ayer, founder of the cosmetics and patent medicine company Recamier Manufacturing.

In 1890, Howard married Baron Julius von Teuffel, a court physician to King Charles I of Württemberg, thereby becoming the Baroness von Teuffel. Howard died in Munich in 1898.

Some of Howard's publications were translated into several European languages, including French, German, and Italian. Howard was among the American novelists of this era who wrote about Americans abroad. The iconic example is Henry James. Howard was an accomplished pianist and she wrote about meeting Franz Liszt. Subsequent news reporting states that Liszt complimented her playing following a performance.

== Works ==
- One Summer (Boston: James R. Osgood, 1875).
- One Year Abroad (Boston: James R. Osgood, 1877).
- Aunt Serena (Boston: James R. Osgood, 1877).
- Guenn: A Wave on the Breton Coast (Boston: James R. Osgood, 1884).
- Aulnay Tower (Boston: Ticknor & Company, 1885).
- Tony, the Maid: A Novelette (New York: Harper and Brothers, 1887).
- The Open Door (Boston: Houghton Mifflin, 1889).
- A Battle and a Boy: A Story for Young People (New York: Tait, Sons, and Co., 1892).
- A Fellowe and His Wife (Boston: Houghton Mifflin, 1893), authored with William Sharp.
- No Heroes: A Story for Boys (Boston: Houghton Mifflin, 1893).
- Seven on the Highway (Boston: Houghton Mifflin, 1897).
- Dionysius, the Weaver's Heart's Dearest (New York: Charles Scribner's Sons, 1899).
- The Garden of Eden (New York: Charles Scribner's Sons, 1900).
