= The Stolen White Elephant =

1882 short story by Mark Twain

First edition

"The Stolen White Elephant" is a short story written by Mark Twain and published in 1882 by James R. Osgood. In this detective mystery, a Siamese white elephant, en route from Siam to Britain as a gift to the Queen, disappears in New Jersey. The local police department goes into high gear to solve the mystery but it all comes to a tragic end.

== Overview ==
The main characters of the story include:

- Mark Twain, who functions as the initial speaker and author of the story.
- An elderly gentleman, an Englishman in the British civil service in India, who told the story to Twain during a train ride and is in charge of transporting the white elephant.
- Chief Inspector Blunt, a detective who is in charge of finding the lost elephant; he first receives the report of the elephant’s disappearance.
- “Hassan Ben Ali Ben Selim Abdallah Mohammed Mois Alhammal Jamsetjejeebhoy Dhuleep Sultan Ebu Bhudpoor” or “Jumbo”, the white elephant
- Alaric, a young worker at the detectives’ office.
- Captain Burns, another employee of the detectives’ office; he is in charge of carrying out Inspector Blunt’s orders.

Also, a number of other detectives, servants and civilians play minor roles in the story.

It is just one of the stories in the first edition shown at right. The others are the same as were included in the earlier publication Punch Brothers Punch in 1878, with the omission of "Legend of Sagenfeld, In Germany", "Rogers", and "Speech on the Weather". And the addition of the titular story, "The Facts Concerning the Recent Carnival of Crime", "Mrs. McWilliams and the Lightning", and "A Curious Experience".

Contents include: "The Stolen White Elephant", "Some Rambling Notes of an Idle Excursion", "The Facts concerning the Recent Carnival of Crime", "About Magnanimous-Incident Literature", Punch Brothers Punch, "A Curious Experience", "The Great Revolution in Pitcairn", "Mrs McWilliams and the Lightning", "On the Decay of the Art of Lying", "The Canvassers Tale", "An Encounter with an Interviewer", "Paris Notes", "Speech on the Babies", "Concerning the American Language", "The Loves of Alonzo Fitz Clarence and Rosannah Ethelton".
