= History of the Rise and Fall of the Slave Power in America =

Book by Henry Wilson

The History of the Rise and Fall of the Slave Power in America is an early history of the American Civil War by Vice President Henry Wilson, who had been a United States senator from Massachusetts during the war.

The book was published in three volumes by J.R. Osgood and Company of Boston, Massachusetts. The first two volumes appeared in 1872, the year Wilson ran for vice president on the winning Republican ticket headed by Ulysses S. Grant. The last volume appeared in 1877, two years after the author's death in office.

Wilson's history went through several more Osgood editions, and was also published by Houghton Mifflin in the 1870s and afterward. A three-volume reprint was published in 1969 by Negro Universities Press. The work has also appeared in microform.

The book's title contains a relatively late usage of the term "Slave Power" for the politically powerful slaveholding class in the American South before the Civil War.
