= Henry Wilson =

Vice President of the United States from 1873 to 1875

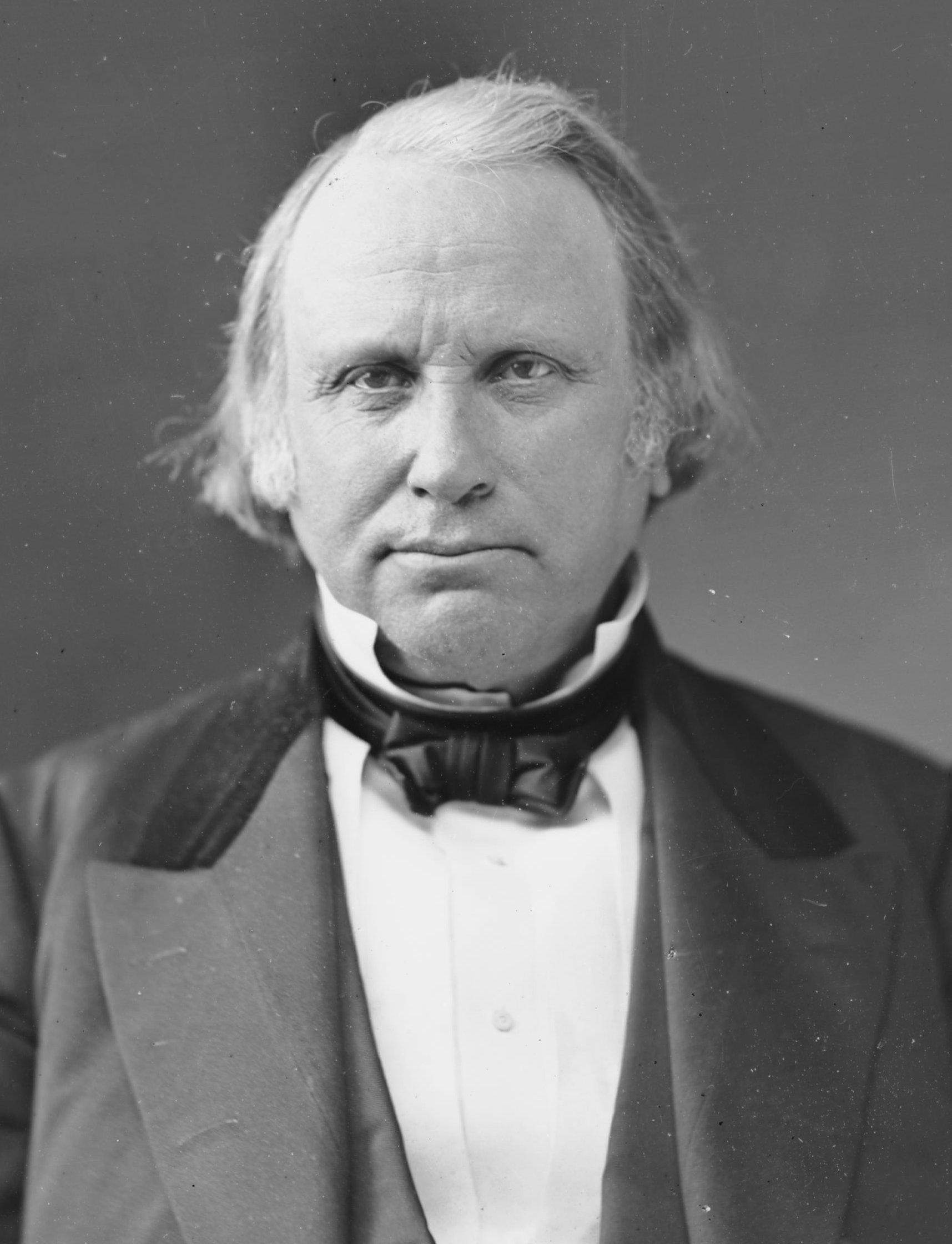
- Wilson in 1873

18th Vice President of the United States
- In office March 4, 1873 – November 22, 1875
- President: Ulysses S. Grant
- Preceded by: Schuyler Colfax
- Succeeded by: William A. Wheeler

United States Senator from Massachusetts
- In office January 31, 1855 – March 3, 1873
- Preceded by: Julius Rockwell
- Succeeded by: George S. Boutwell

Chair of the Senate Military Affairs Committee
- In office March 4, 1861 – March 3, 1873
- Preceded by: Jefferson Davis
- Succeeded by: John A. Logan

President of the Massachusetts Senate
- In office January 2, 1851 – January 6, 1853
- Preceded by: Marshall Wilder
- Succeeded by: Charles Henry Warren

Member of the Massachusetts Senate from Middlesex County
- In office January 2, 1851 – January 6, 1853 Serving with Multimember district (Note: Wilson served in the state senate with Joseph T. Buckingham (1851), John W. Graves (1851), John Boynton (1851), Luke Wellington (1851), James M. Usher (1851), Charles C. Hazewell (1852), Ithamar W. Beard (1852), Anson Burlingame (1852), Joseph Fuller (1852), and Samuel E. Sewall (1852))
- Preceded by: Multimember district (Note: Wilson's district was previously represented by Charles Choate, Joseph T. Buckingham, John W. Graves, Charles Thompson, Edwin Whitney, and Arnold Hutchinson)
- Succeeded by: Multimember district (Note: Wilson's district was subsequently represented by Benjamin Adams, G. Washington Warren, Sanford B. Perry, Winthrop E. Faulkner, Allen Cummings, and Samuel D. Davenport)
- In office January 3, 1844 – January 1, 1846 Serving with Multimember district (Note: Wilson served during this state senate term with Stevens Hayward (1844), Asa F. Lawrence (1844), Isaac Livermore (1844, 1845), Charles Choate (1844, 1845), Royal Southwick (1844, 1845), Stephen Hayward (1844, 1845), and James P. Whitney (1845))
- Preceded by: Multimember district (Note: In the previous term, Wilson's district was represented by James Fuller, Frederick Robinson, Josiah G. Abbott, Thomas J. Greenwood, Jonathan Hartwell, and Francis R. Gourgas)
- Succeeded by: Multimember district (Note: Wilson's district was subsequently represented by James P. Whitney, Thomas Hopkinson, Ebenezer R. Hoar, Eli Rice, Thomas Emerson, and Alfred Allen)

Member of the Massachusetts House of Representatives from Natick
- In office January 5, 1841 – January 3, 1843
- Preceded by: None (position not filled)
- Succeeded by: John Travis

Personal details
- Born: Jeremiah Jones Colbath; February 16, 1812 Farmington, New Hampshire, U.S.
- Died: November 22, 1875 (aged 63) Washington, D.C., U.S.
- Resting place: Old Dell Park Cemetery, Natick, Massachusetts
- Party: Whig (before 1848); Free Soil (1848–1854); Know Nothing (1854–1855); Republican (1855–1875)
- Spouse: Harriet Howe (m. 1840; died 1870)
- Children: 2

Military service
- Allegiance: Massachusetts; United States; Union
- Branch/service: Massachusetts Militia (MM); Union Army (UA)
- Years of service: 1843–1852 (MM); 1861 (UA)
- Rank: Brigadier general (MM); Colonel (UA)
- Commands: 1st Artillery Regiment (MM); 3rd Brigade (MM); 22nd Regiment Massachusetts Volunteer Infantry (UA)
- Battles/wars: American Civil War

Henry Wilson (born Jeremiah Jones Colbath; February 16, 1812 – November 22, 1875) was the 18th vice president of the United States, serving from 1873 until his death in 1875, and a senator from Massachusetts from 1855 to 1873. Before and during the American Civil War, he was a leading Republican, and a strong opponent of slavery. Wilson devoted his energies to the destruction of "Slave Power", the faction of slave owners and their political allies which anti-slavery Americans saw as dominating the country.

Originally a Whig, Wilson was a founder of the Free Soil Party in 1848. He served as the party chairman before and during the 1852 presidential election. Wilson worked diligently to build an anti-slavery coalition, which came to include the Free Soil Party, anti-slavery Democrats, New York Barnburners, the Liberty Party, anti-slavery members of the Know Nothings, and anti-slavery Whigs (called Conscience Whigs). When the Free Soil party dissolved in the mid-1850s, Wilson joined the Republican Party, which he helped found, and which was organized largely in line with the anti-slavery coalition he had nurtured in the 1840s and 1850s.

While a senator during the Civil War, Wilson was considered a "Radical Republican", and his experience as a militia general, organizer and commander of a Union Army regiment, and chairman of the Senate military committees enabled him to assist the Abraham Lincoln administration in the organization and oversight of the Union Army and Union Navy. Wilson successfully authored bills that outlawed slavery in Washington, D.C., and incorporated African Americans in the Union Civil War effort in 1862.

After the Civil War, he supported the Radical Republican program for Reconstruction. In 1872, Wilson was elected vice president as the running mate of Ulysses S. Grant, the incumbent president of the United States, who was running for a second term. The Grant and Wilson ticket was successful, and Wilson served as vice president from March 4, 1873, until his death on November 22, 1875. Wilson's effectiveness as vice president was limited after he suffered a debilitating stroke in May 1873, and his health continued to decline until he was the victim of a fatal stroke while working in the United States Capitol in late 1875.

Throughout his career, Wilson was known for championing causes that were unpopular, including workers' rights for both blacks and whites and the abolition of slavery. Massachusetts politician George Frisbie Hoar, who served in the United States House of Representatives while Wilson was a senator and later served in the Senate himself, believed Wilson to be the most skilled political organizer in the country. However, Wilson's reputation for personal integrity and principled politics was somewhat damaged late in his Senate career by his involvement in the Crédit Mobilier scandal.

== Early life and education ==
Wilson was born in Farmington, New Hampshire, on February 16, 1812, one of several children born to Winthrop and Abigail (Witham) Colbath. His father named him Jeremiah Jones Colbath after a wealthy neighbor who was a childless bachelor, vainly hoping that this gesture might result in an inheritance. Winthrop Colbath was a militia veteran of the War of 1812 who worked as a day laborer and hired himself out to local farms and businesses, in addition to occasionally running a sawmill.

The Colbath family was impoverished; after a brief elementary education, at the age of 10 Wilson was indentured to a neighboring farmer, where he worked as a laborer for the next 10 years. During this time two neighbors gave him books and Wilson enhanced his meager education by reading extensively on English history, American history and biographies of famous historical figures. At the end of his service he was given "six sheep and a yoke of oxen." Wilson immediately sold his animals for $85 (about $2,200 in 2021), which was the first money he had earned during his indenture.

Wilson apparently did not like his birth name, though the reasons given vary. Some sources indicate that he was not close to his family, or disliked his name because of his father's supposed intemperance and modest financial circumstances. Others indicate that he was called "Jed" and "Jerry," and disliked the nicknames so much that he resolved to change his name. (Note: That his name change resulted from disrespect of his father or lack of closeness with his family are belied by the fact that some of his relatives followed him after he relocated to Natick, Massachusetts, including brother George A. Colbath. In addition, Winthrop and Abigail Colbath moved to Natick in 1848. Winthrop died in Natick in 1860, and Abigail died there in 1866.) Whatever the reason, when he turned 21 he successfully petitioned the New Hampshire General Court to legally change it. He chose the name Henry Wilson, inspired either by a biography of a Philadelphia teacher or a portrait from a book on English clergymen.

== Career ==
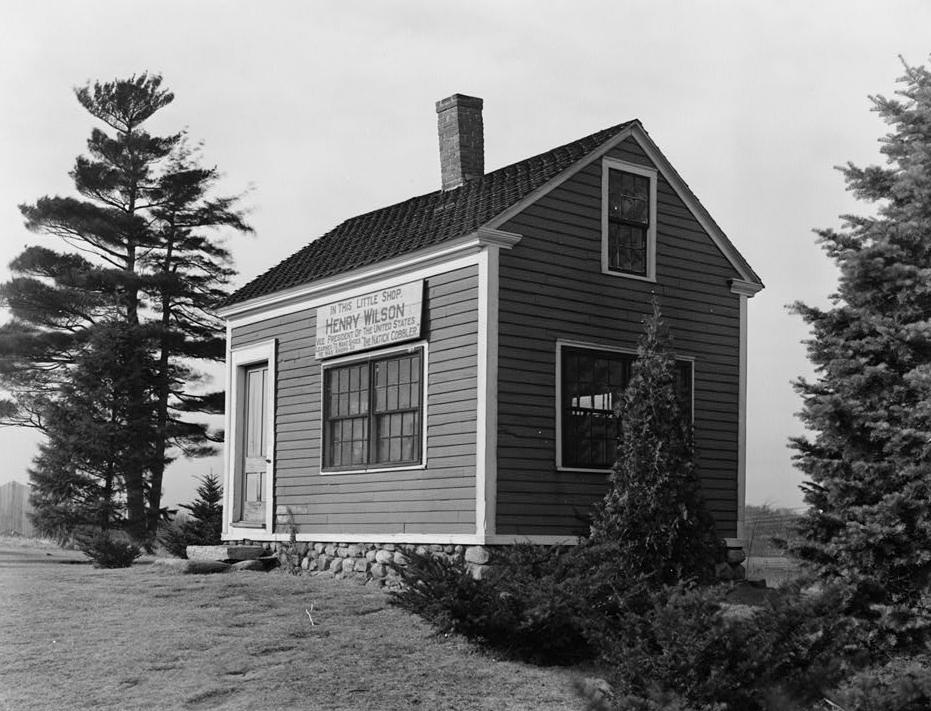
Henry Wilson's shoeshop in Natick, Massachusetts

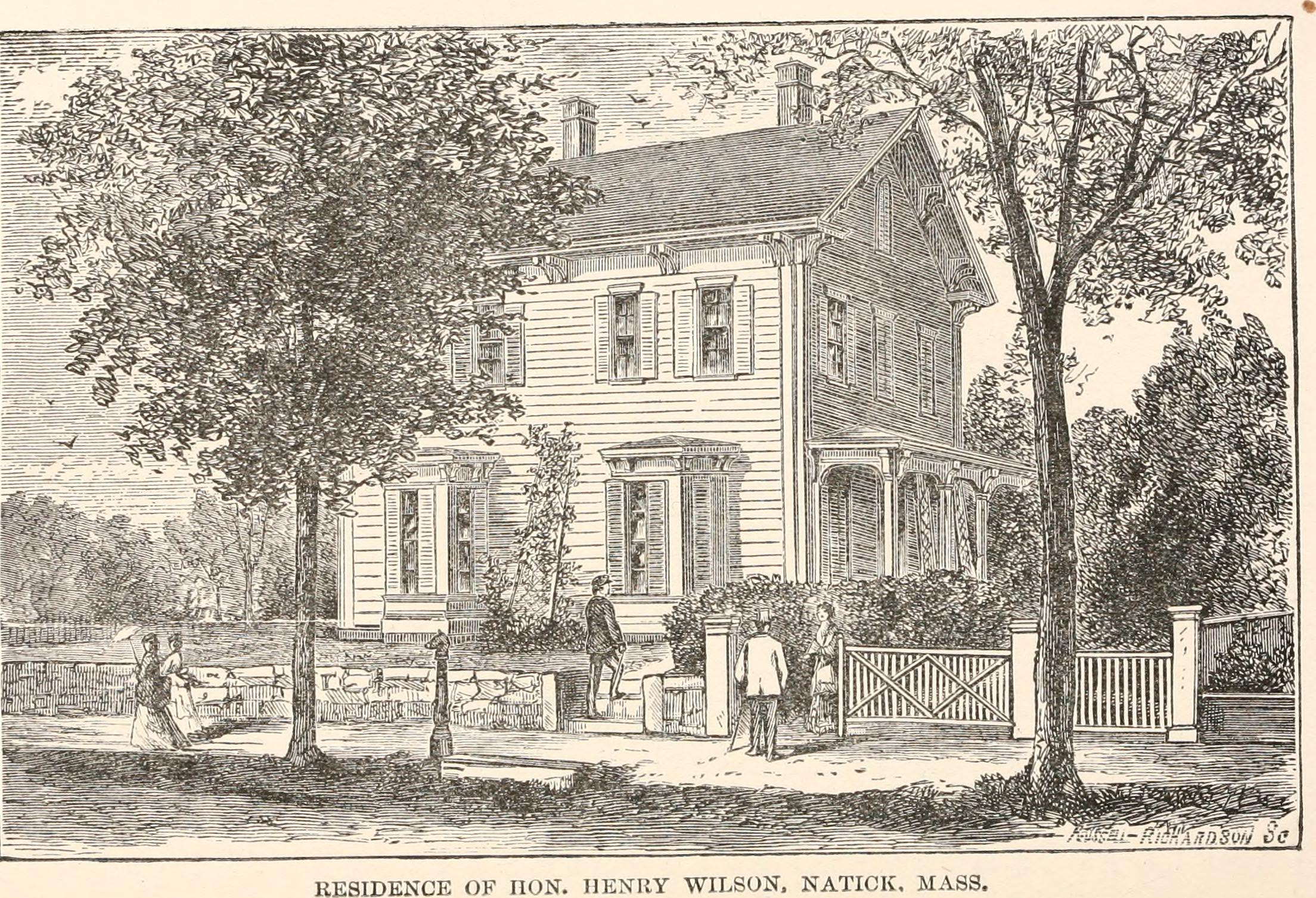
Henry Wilson's Natick home.

After trying and failing to find work in New Hampshire, in 1833 Wilson walked more than one hundred miles to Natick, Massachusetts, seeking employment or a trade. Having met William P. Legro, a shoemaker who was willing to train him, Wilson hired himself out for five months to learn to make leather shoes called brogans. Wilson learned the trade in a few weeks, bought out his employment contract for fifteen dollars, and opened his own shop, intending to save enough money to study law. Wilson had success as a shoemaker, and was able to save several hundred dollars in a relatively short time. This success gave rise to legends about Wilson's skill; according to one story that grew with retelling, he once attempted to make one hundred pairs of shoes without sleeping, and fell asleep with the one hundredth pair in his hand. Wilson's shoemaking experience led to the creation of the political nicknames his supporters later used to highlight his working class roots—the "Natick Cobbler" and the "Natick Shoemaker".

During this time Wilson read extensively and joined the Natick Debating Society, where he developed into an accomplished speaker. Wilson's health suffered as the result of the long hours he worked making shoes, and he traveled to Virginia to recuperate. During a stop in Washington, D.C., he heard Congressional debates on slavery and abolitionism, and observed African American families being separated as they were bought and sold in the Washington slave trade. Wilson resolved to dedicate himself "to the cause of emancipation in America," and after regaining his health returned to New England, where he furthered his education by attending several New Hampshire academies, including schools in Strafford, Wolfeboro, and Concord.

Having spent part of his savings on his traveling and schooling, and having lost some as the result of a loan that was not repaid, Wilson worked as a schoolteacher to get out of debt and begin saving money again, intending to start a business of his own. Beginning with an investment of only twelve dollars, Wilson started a shoe manufacturing company. This venture proved successful, and he eventually employed over 100 workers.

== Political career ==
Wilson became active politically as a Whig, and campaigned for William Henry Harrison in 1840. He had joined the Whigs out of disappointment with the fiscal policies of Democrats Andrew Jackson and Martin Van Buren, and like most Whigs blamed them for the Panic of 1837. In 1840 he was also elected to the Massachusetts House of Representatives, and served from 1841 to 1843.

Wilson was a member of the Massachusetts State Senate from 1844 to 1846 and 1850 to 1852. From 1851 to 1852 he was the Senate's President.

As early as 1845, Wilson had started to become disenchanted with the Whigs as the party attempted to compromise on the slavery issue, and as a Conscience Whig he took steps including the organization of a convention in Concord opposed to the annexation of Texas because it would expand slavery. As a result of this effort, in late 1845 Wilson and abolitionist John Greenleaf Whittier were chosen to submit in person a petition to Congress containing the signatures of 65,000 Massachusetts residents opposed to Texas annexation.

Wilson was a delegate to the 1848 Whig National Convention, but left the party after it nominated slave owner Zachary Taylor for president and took no position on the Wilmot Proviso, which would have prohibited slavery in territory acquired from Mexico in the Mexican–American War. Wilson and Charles Allen, another Massachusetts delegate, withdrew from the convention, and called for a new meeting of anti-slavery advocates in Buffalo, which launched the Free Soil Party.

Having left the Whig Party, Wilson worked to build coalitions with others opposed to slavery, including Free Soilers, anti-slavery Democrats, Barnburners from New York's Democratic Party, the Liberty Party, the anti-slavery elements of the Whig Party, and anti-slavery members of the Know Nothing or Native American Party. Although Wilson's new political coalition was initially castigated by "straight party" adherents of the mainstream Democratic and Whig parties, Wilson was successful in an effort to broker an alliance between the minority Free Soil and Democratic parties in the state elections of 1850, notably resulting in the election of Charles Sumner to the Senate.

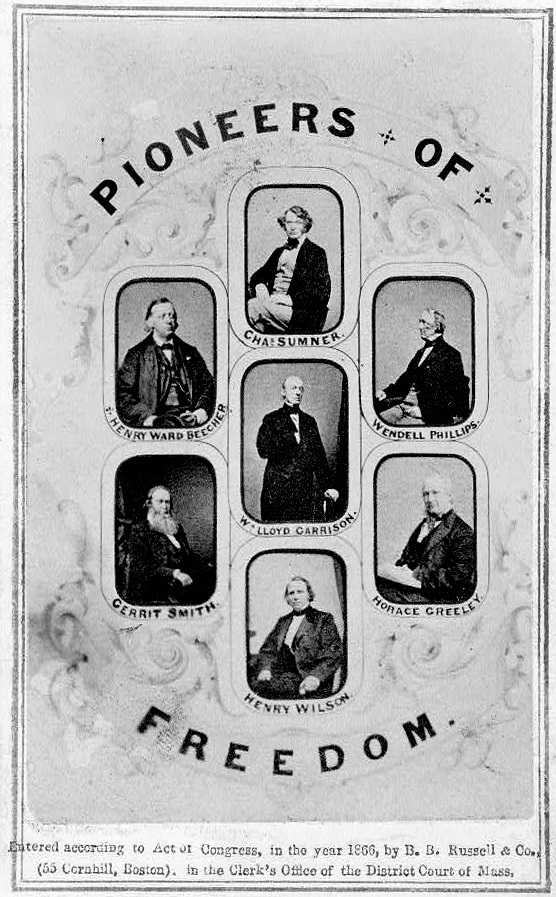
Abolitionist and Free Soil Party leaders Charles Sumner, Henry Ward Beecher, Wendell Phillips, William Lloyd Garrison, Gerrit Smith, Horace Greeley, and Henry Wilson.

From 1848 to 1851 Wilson was the owner and editor of the Boston Republican, which from 1841 to 1848 was a Whig outlet, and from 1848 to 1851 was the main Free Soil Party newspaper.

During his service in the Massachusetts legislature, Wilson took note that participation in the state militia had declined, and that it was not in a state of readiness. In addition to undertaking legislative efforts to provide uniforms and other equipment, in 1843 Wilson joined the militia himself, becoming a major in the 1st Artillery Regiment, which he later commanded with the rank of colonel. In 1846 Wilson was promoted to brigadier general as commander of the Massachusetts Militia's 3rd Brigade, a position he held until 1852.

=== Free Soil Party organizer ===
In 1852, Wilson was chairman of the Free Soil Party's national convention in Pittsburgh, which nominated John P. Hale for president and George Washington Julian for vice president. Later that year he was a Free Soil candidate for U.S. Representative, and lost to Whig Tappan Wentworth. He was a delegate to the state constitutional convention in 1853, which proposed a series of political and governmental reforms that were defeated by voters in a post-convention popular referendum. He ran unsuccessfully for Governor of Massachusetts as a Free Soil candidate in 1853 and 1854, but declined to be a candidate again in 1855 because he had his sights set on the U.S. Senate.

=== U.S. Senator (1855–1873) ===
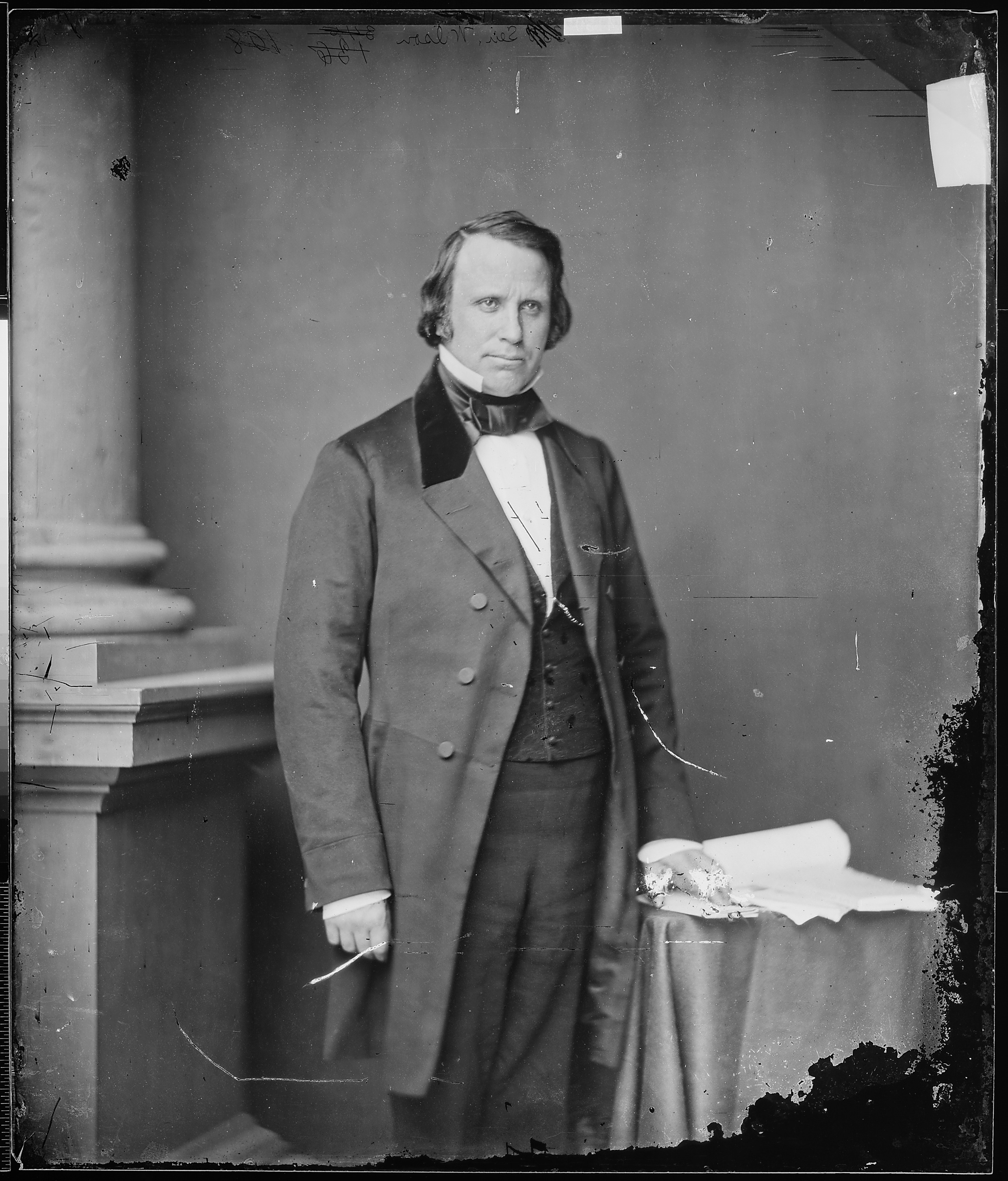
U.S. Senator Henry Wilson, photograph by Mathew Brady

In 1855 Wilson was elected to the United States Senate by a coalition of Free-Soilers, Know Nothings, and anti-slavery Democrats, filling the vacancy caused by the resignation of Edward Everett. He had briefly joined the Know-Nothings in an attempt to strengthen their anti-slavery efforts, but aligned himself with the Republican Party at its creation, formed largely along the lines of the anti-slavery coalition Wilson had helped develop and nurture. Wilson was reelected as a Republican in 1859, 1865 and 1871, and served from January 31, 1855, to March 3, 1873, when he resigned in order to begin his vice presidential term on March 4.

In his first Senate speech in 1855, Wilson continued to align himself with the abolitionists, who wanted to immediately end slavery in the United States and its territories. In his speech, Wilson said he wanted to abolish slavery "wherever we are morally and legally responsible for its existence", including Washington, D.C., Wilson also demanded repeal of the Fugitive Slave Act of 1850, believing the federal government should have no responsibility for enforcing slavery, and that once the act was repealed tensions between slavery proponents and opponents would abate, enabling those Southerners who opposed slavery to help end it in their own time.

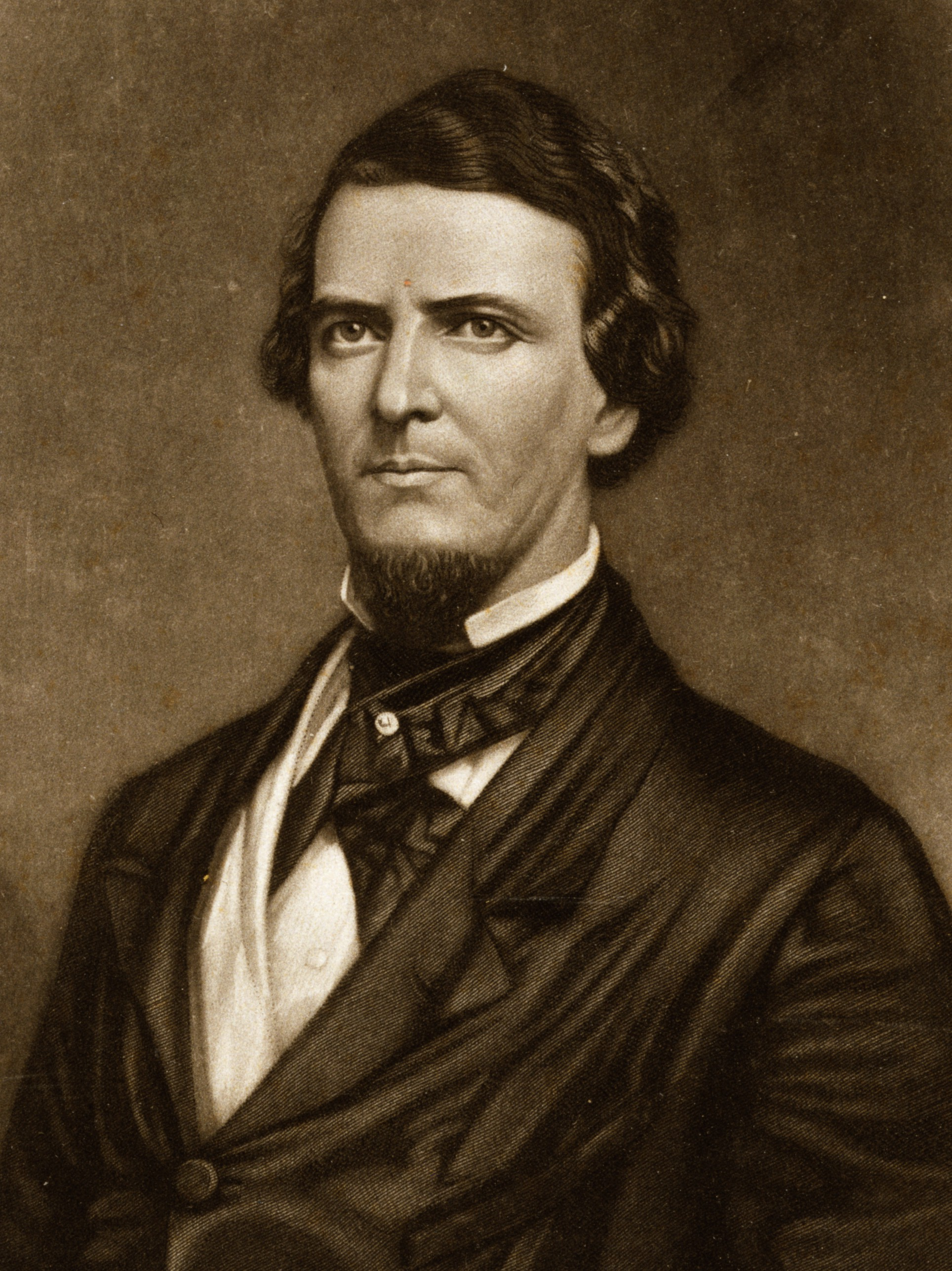
Preston Brooks challenged Wilson to a duel in 1856.

On May 22, 1856, Preston Brooks brutally assaulted Senator Charles Sumner on the Senate floor, leaving Sumner bloody and unconscious. Brooks had been upset over Sumner's Crimes Against Kansas speech that denounced the Kansas–Nebraska Act. After the beating, Sumner received medical treatment at the Capitol, following which Wilson and Nathaniel P. Banks, the Speaker of the House, aided Sumner to travel by carriage to his lodgings, where he received further medical attention. Wilson called the beating by Brooks "brutal, murderous, and cowardly". Brooks immediately challenged Wilson to a duel. Wilson declined, saying that he could not legally or by personal conviction participate. In reference to a rumor that Brooks might attack Wilson in the Senate as he had attacked Sumner, Wilson told the press "I have sought no controversy, and I seek none, but I shall go where duty requires, uninfluenced by threats of any kind." The rumors proved unfounded, and Wilson continued his Senate duties without incident.

The attack on Sumner took place just one day after pro-slavery Missourians killed one person in the burning and sacking of Lawrence, Kansas. The attack on Sumner and the sacking of Lawrence were later viewed as two of the incidents which symbolized the "breakdown of reasoned discourse." This phrase came to describe the period when activists and politicians moved past the debate of anti-slavery and pro-slavery speeches and non-violent actions, and into the realm of physical violence, which in part hastened the onset of the American Civil War.

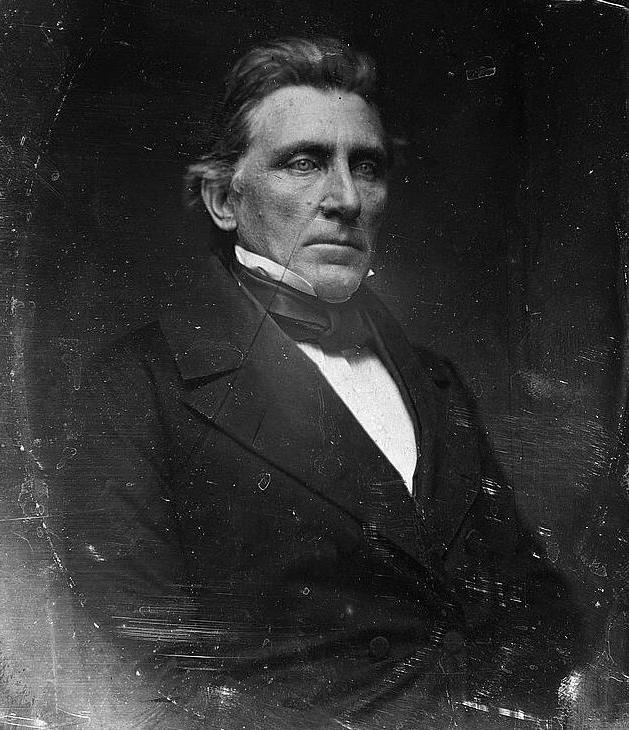
In 1858, Wilson was challenged to a duel by California Democratic Senator William M. Gwin.

In June 1858 Wilson made a Senate speech in which he suggested corruption in the government of California and implied complicity on the part of Senator William M. Gwin, a pro-slavery Democrat who had served as a member of Congress from Mississippi before moving to California. Gwin was backed by a powerful Southern coalition of pro-slavery Democrats called the Chivs, who had a monopoly on federal patronage in California. Gwin accused Wilson of demagoguery, and Wilson responded by saying he would rather be thought a demagogue than a thief. Gwin then challenged Wilson to a duel; Wilson declined in the same terms he used to decline a duel with Preston Brooks. In fact neither Gwin nor Wilson wanted to follow through, and commentary about the dispute broke down along partisan lines. One pro-Gwin editorial called the insinuation that Gwin was corrupt "a most malignant falsehood", while a pro-Wilson editorial called his reluctance to take part in a duel evidence that he was "honest" and "conscientious", and had "more respect for the laws of this country than his adversary". After several attempts to find a face-saving compromise, Gwin and Wilson agreed to refer their dispute to three senators who would serve as mediators. William H. Seward, John J. Crittenden and Jefferson Davis were chosen, and produced an acceptable solution. At their instigation, Wilson stated to the Senate that he had not meant to impugn Gwin's honor, and Gwin replied by saying that he had not meant to question Wilson's motives. In addition, the mediators caused to be removed from the Senate record both Gwin's remarks about demagoguery and Wilson's suggestion that Gwin was a thief.

== Civil War ==
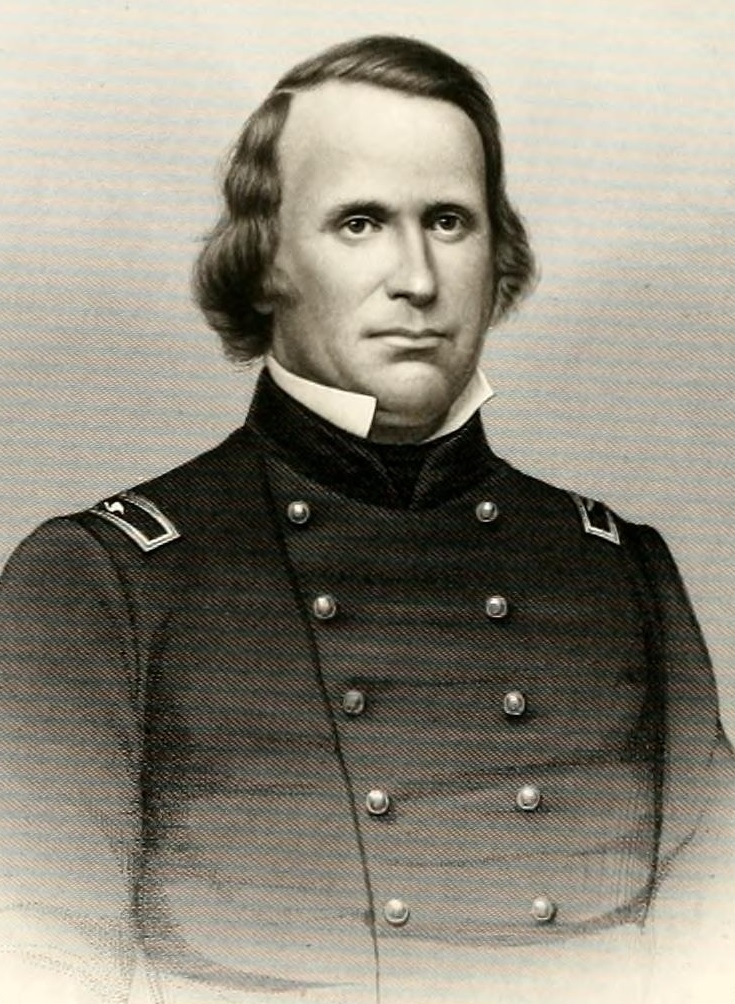
Wilson as colonel and commander, 22nd Massachusetts Volunteer Infantry.

During the American Civil War, Wilson was Chairman of the Committee on Military Affairs and the Militia, and later the Committee on Military Affairs. In that capacity, he oversaw action on over 15,000 War and Navy Department nominations that Abraham Lincoln submitted during the course of the war, and worked closely with him on legislation affecting the Army and Navy.

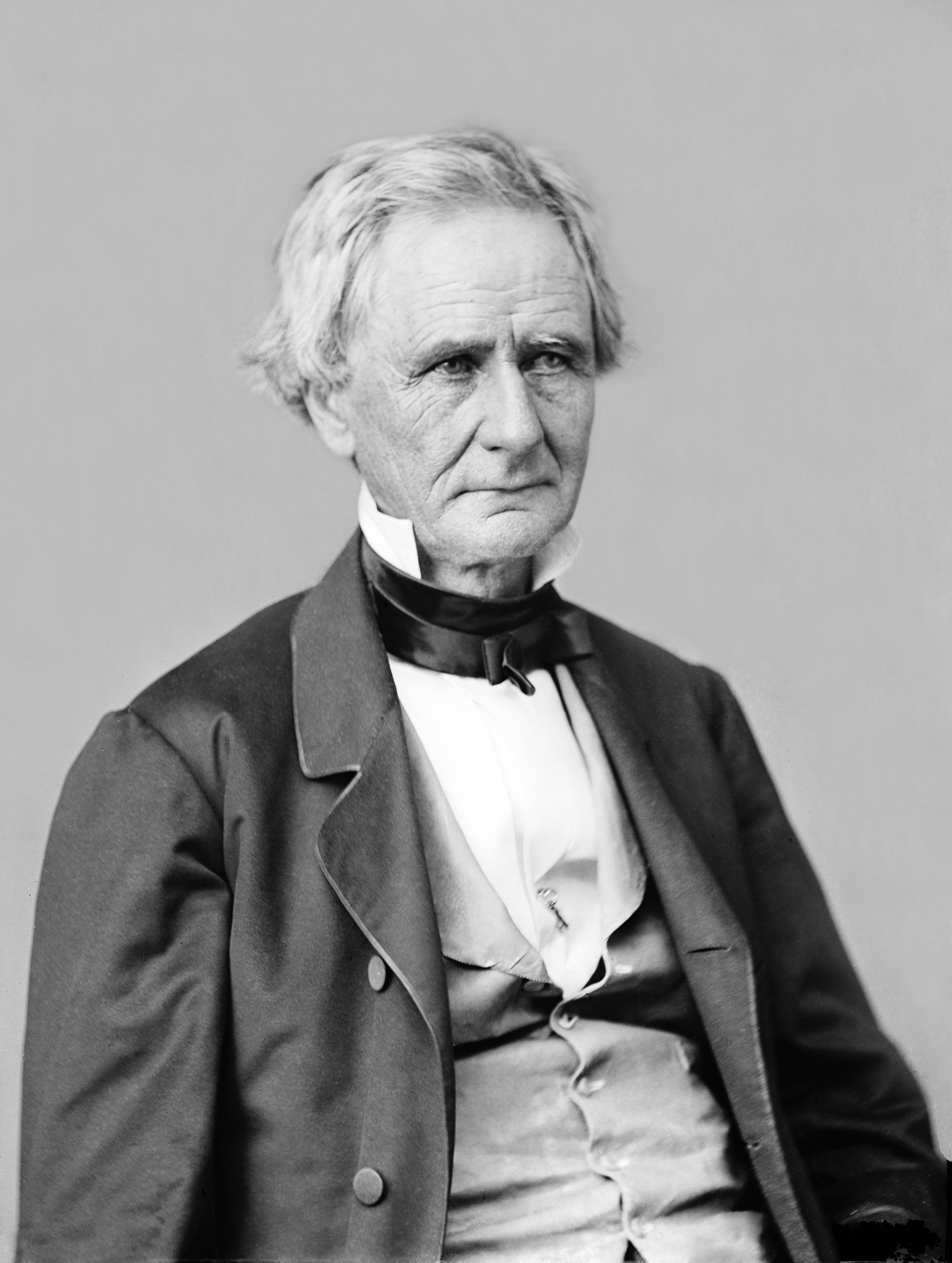
After his 1862 resignation as Secretary of War, Simon Cameron praised Wilson's work aiding the War Department.

In the summer of 1861, after the congressional session ended, Wilson returned to Massachusetts and recruited and equipped nearly 2,300 men in forty days. They were mustered in as the 22nd Massachusetts Volunteer Infantry, which he commanded as a colonel from September 27 to October 29, an honor sometimes accorded to the individual responsible for raising and equipping a regiment.

Shortly after the war's conclusion in 1865, he became an early member of the Pennsylvania Commandery of the Military Order of the Loyal Legion of the United States (MOLLUS). He was assigned MOLLUS insignia number 28.

Wilson's experience in the militia, service with the 22nd Massachusetts, and chairmanship of the Military Affairs Committee provided him with more practical military knowledge and training than any other Senator. He made use of this experience throughout the war to frame, explain, defend and advocate for legislation on military matters, including enlistment of soldiers and sailors, and organizing and supplying the rapidly expanding Union Army and Union Navy.

Winfield Scott, the Commanding General of the United States Army since 1841, said that during the session of Congress that ended in the Spring of 1861 Wilson had done more work "than all the chairmen of the military committees had done for the last 20 years." On January 27, 1862, Simon Cameron, the recently resigned Secretary of War, echoed Scott's sentiments when he said that "no man, in my opinion, in the whole country, has done more to aid the war department in preparing the mighty [Union] army now under arms than yourself [Wilson]."

=== Greenhow controversy ===
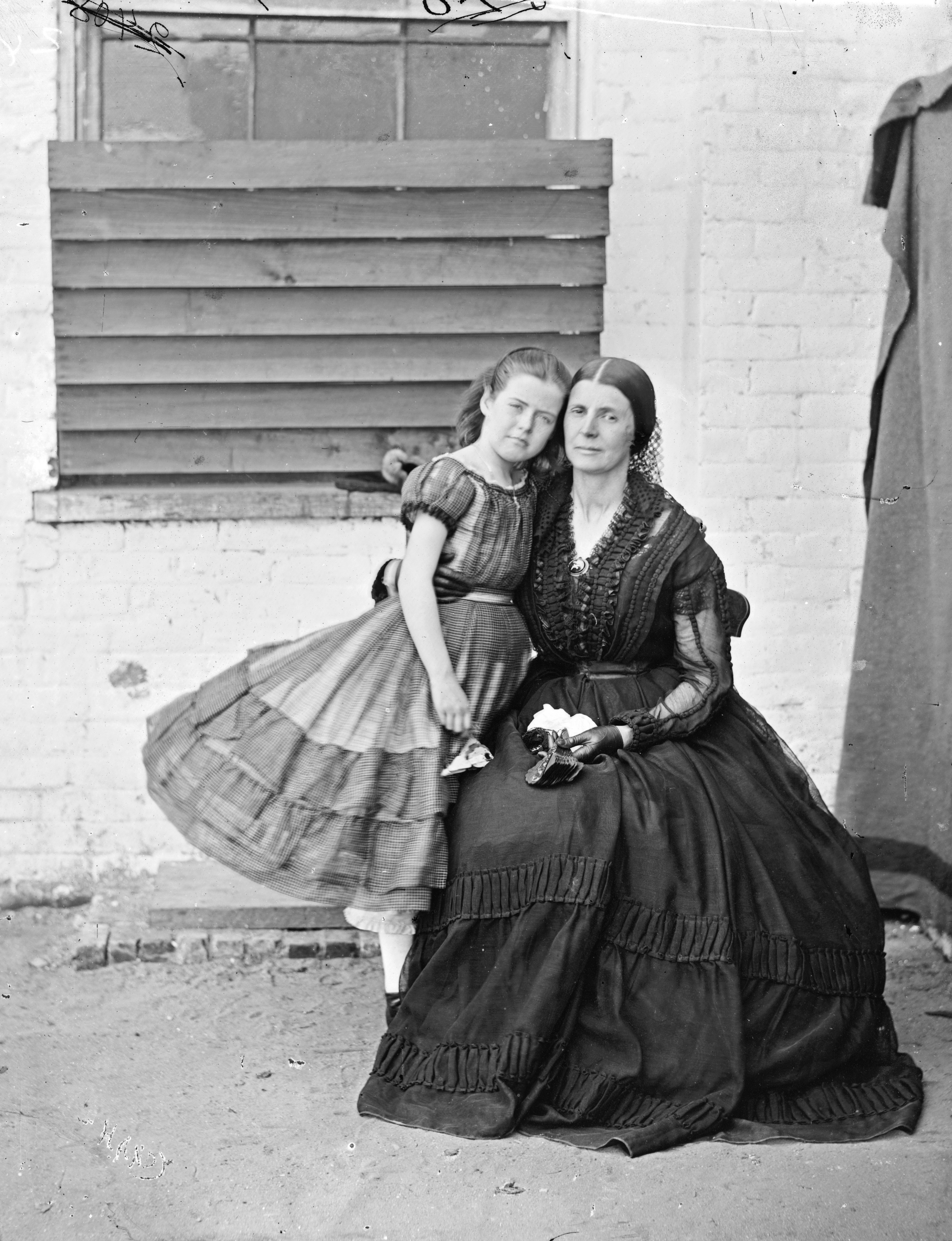
Rose O'Neal Greenhow and her daughter

In July 1861, Wilson was present for the Civil War's first major battle at Bull Run Creek in Manassas, Virginia, an event which many senators, representatives, newspaper reporters, and Washington society elite traveled from the city to observe in anticipation of a quick Union victory. Riding out in a carriage in the early morning, Wilson brought a picnic hamper of sandwiches to feed Union troops. However, the battle turned into a Confederate rout, forcing Union troops to make a panicky retreat. Caught up in the chaos, Wilson was almost captured by the Confederates, while his carriage was crushed, and he had to make an embarrassing return to Washington on foot. The result of this battle had a sobering effect on many in the North, causing widespread realization that Union victory would not be won without a prolonged struggle.

In seeking to place blame for the Union defeat, some in Washington spread rumors that Wilson had revealed plans for the Union invasion of Virginia to Washington society figure and Southern spy Rose O'Neal Greenhow. According to the story, although he was married, Wilson had seen a great deal of Mrs. Greenhow, and may have told her about the plans of Major General Irvin McDowell, which Mrs. Greenhow then conveyed to Confederate forces under Major General P. G. T. Beauregard. One Wilson biography suggests someone else—Wilson's Senate clerk Horace White—was also friendly with Mrs. Greenhow and could have leaked the invasion plan, although it is also possible that neither Wilson nor White did so.

=== Equal rights activism ===
On December 16, 1861, Wilson introduced a bill to abolish slavery in Washington, D.C., something he had desired to do since his visit to the nation's capital 25 years earlier. At this time fugitive slaves from the war were being held in prisons of Washington, D.C., and faced the possibility of return to their owners. Wilson said of his bill that it would "blot out slavery forever from the nation's capital". The measure met bitter opposition from the Democrats who remained in the Senate after those from the southern states vacated their seats to join the Confederacy, but it passed. After passage in the House, President Lincoln signed Wilson's bill into law on April 16, 1862.

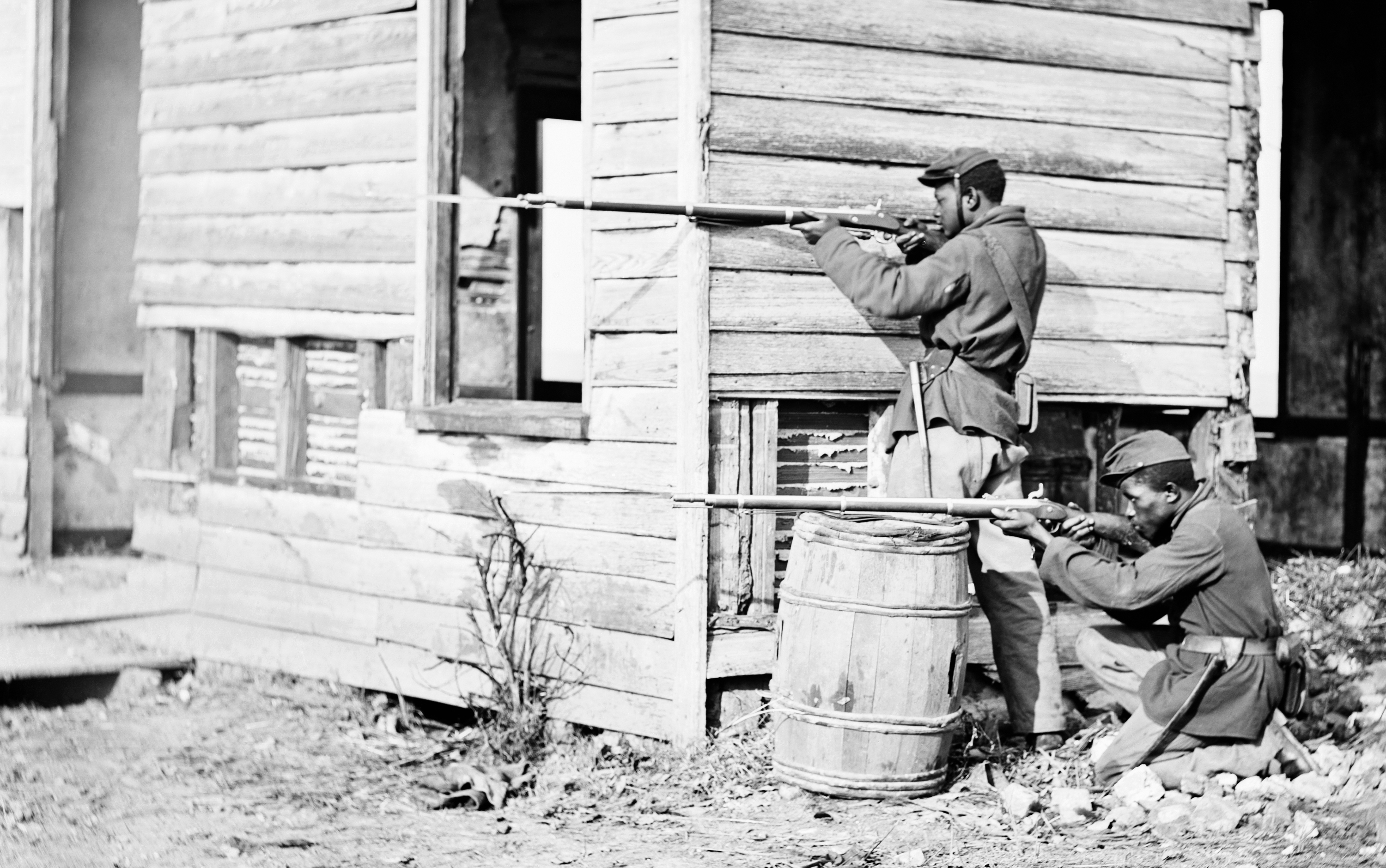
African American Union soldiers, Dutch Gap, Virginia, November 1864

On July 8, 1862, Wilson drafted a measure that authorized the President to enlist African Americans who had been held in slavery and were deemed competent for military service, and employ them to construct fortifications and carry out other military-related manual labor, the first step towards allowing African Americans to serve as soldiers. President Lincoln signed the amendment into law on July 17. Wilson's law paid African Americans in the military $10 monthly, which was effectively $7 a month after deductions for food and clothing, while white soldiers were paid effectively $14 monthly.

On January 1, 1863, Lincoln's Emancipation Proclamation freed all slaves held in bondage in the Southern states or territories then in rebellion against the federal government. On February 2, 1863, Congress built on Wilson's 1862 law by passing a bill authored by Pennsylvania Congressman Thaddeus Stevens, which authorized the enlistment of 150,000 African Americans into the Union Army for service as uniformed soldiers.

On February 17, 1863, Wilson introduced a bill that would federally fund elementary education for African American youth in Washington, D.C. President Lincoln signed the bill into law on March 3, 1863.

Wilson added an amendment to the 1864 Enrollment Act which provided that formerly enslaved African Americans from slave holding states remaining in the Union who enlisted in the Union Army would be considered permanently free by action of the federal government, rather than through individual emancipation by the states or their owners, thus preventing the possibility of their re-enslavement. President Lincoln signed this measure into law on February 24, 1864, freeing more than 20,000 slaves in Kentucky alone.

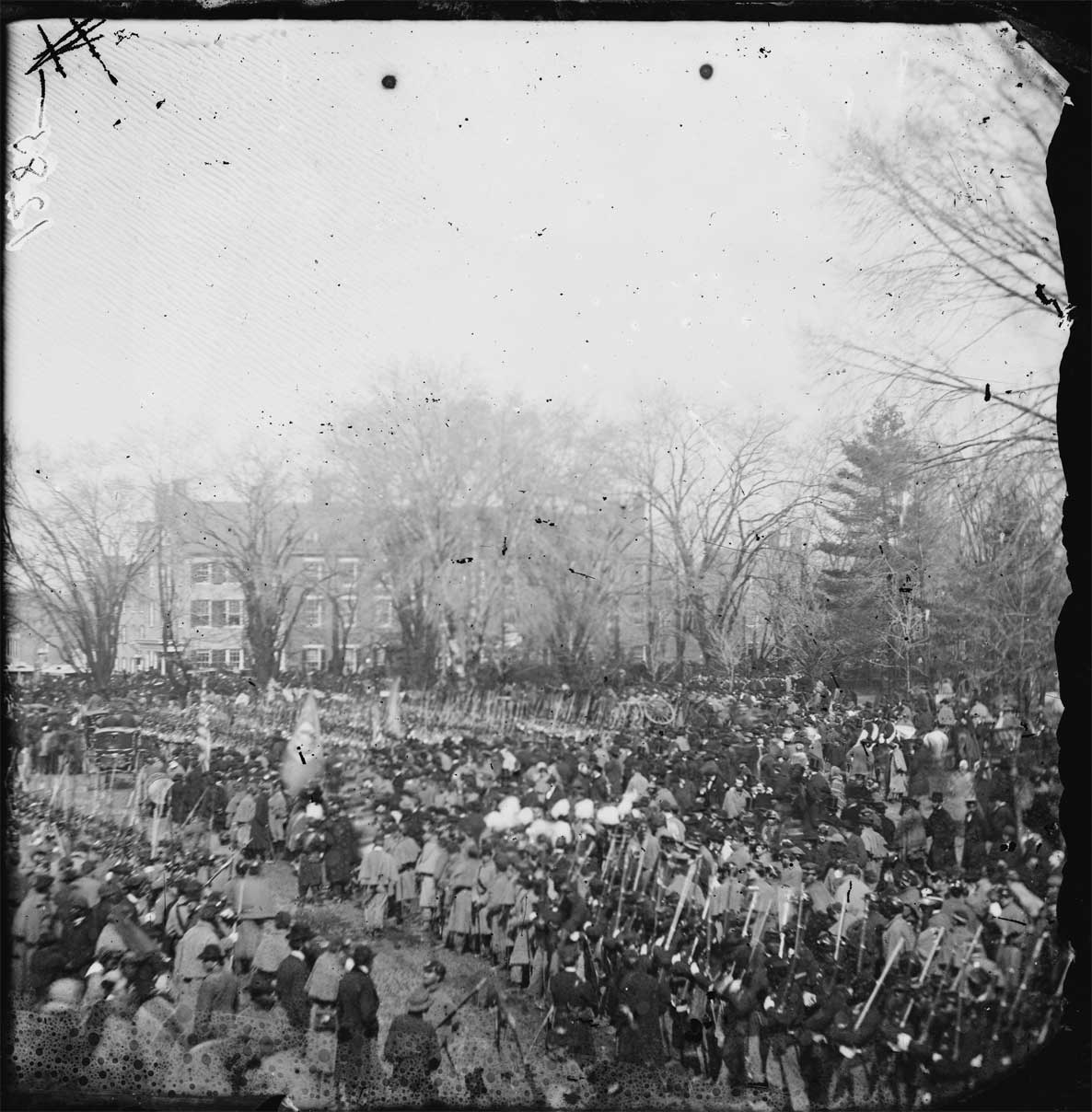
African American Union Troops at Lincoln's second Inauguration, Washington, D.C., March 4, 1865. Wilson successfully authored legislation granting them equal pay in June 1864

Wilson supported the right of black men to join the uniformed services. Once African Americans were permitted to serve in the military, Wilson advocated in the Senate for them to receive equal pay and other benefits. A Vermont newspaper portrayed Wilson's position and enhanced his nationwide reputation as an abolitionist by editorializing "Henry Wilson of Massachusetts, in a speech in the U.S. Senate on Friday, said he thought our treatment of the negro soldiers almost as bad as that of the rebels at Fort Pillow. This is hardly an exaggeration."

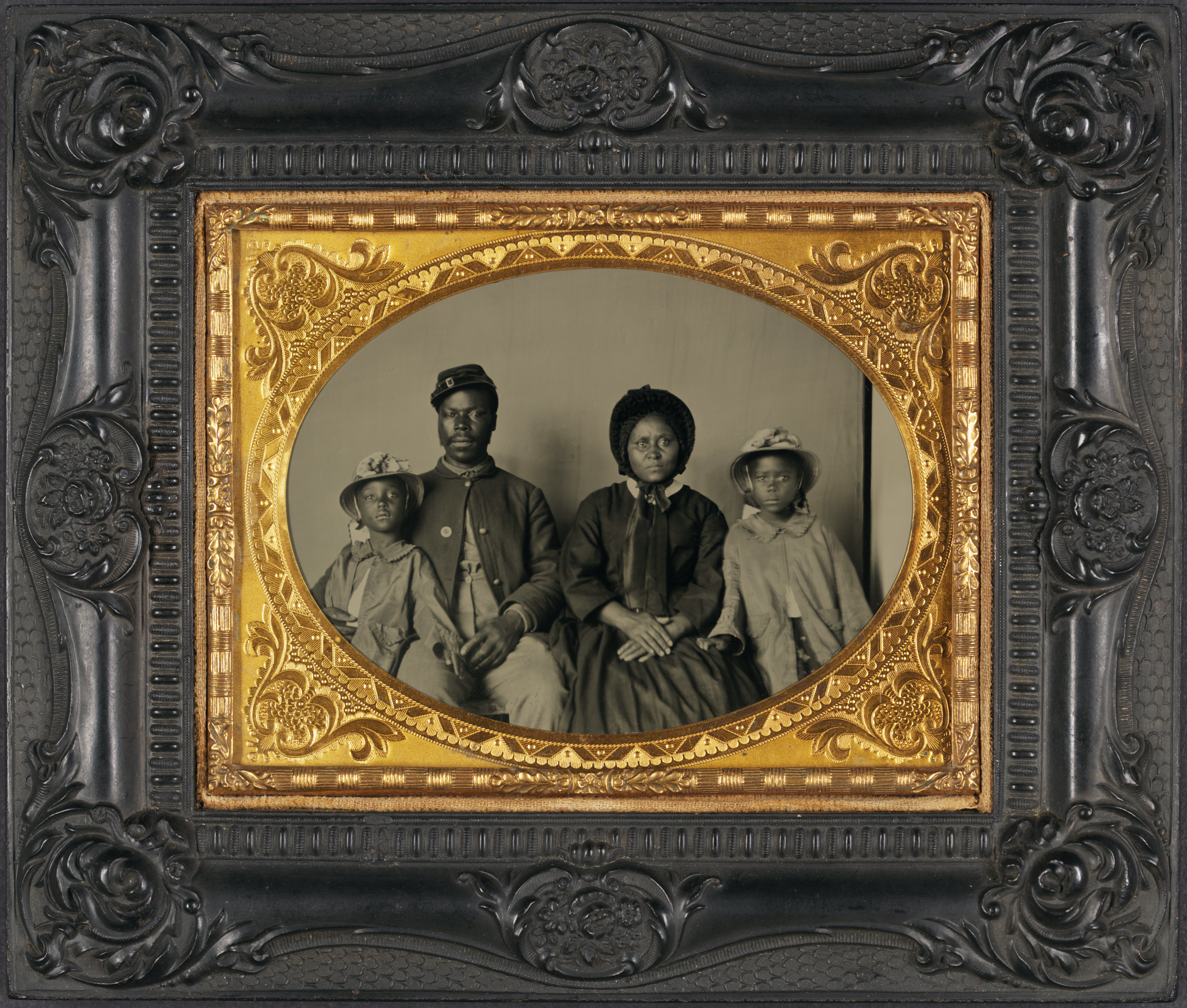
African American Union soldier and his family ... circa 1863–1865

On June 15, 1864, Wilson succeeded in adding a provision to an appropriations bill which addressed the pay disparity between whites and blacks in the military by authorizing equal salaries and benefits for African American soldiers. Wilson's provision stated that "all persons of color who had been or might be mustered into the military service should receive the same uniform, clothing, rations, medical and hospital attendance, and pay" as white soldiers, to date from January 1864.

Wilson introduced a bill in Congress which would free in the Union's slave-holding states the still-enslaved families of former slaves serving in the Union Army. In advocating for passage, Wilson argued that allowing the family members of soldiers to remain in slavery was a "burning shame to this country ... Let us hasten the enactment ... that, on the forehead of the soldier's wife and the soldier's child, no man can write "Slave". President Lincoln signed the measure into law on March 3, 1865, and an estimated 75,000 African American women and children were freed in Kentucky alone.

=== Creation of the National Academy of Sciences ===
In early 1863, Louis Agassiz, one of a group of Cambridge, Massachusetts scientists interested in establishing an academy of sciences modeled on the Royal Society and the French Institute, approached Wilson with the idea of establishing such an academy. On February 11, 1863, a Permanent Commission, which comprised Admiral Charles Henry Davis and the scientists Joseph Henry and Alexander Dallas Bache, was appointed within the Navy Department and given the task of evaluating and reporting on the inventions and other ideas submitted by citizens in order to aid the war effort. The establishment of the Permanent Commission prompted Davis to suggest that "the whole plan, so long entertained, of the Academy could be successfully carried out if an act of incorporation were boldly asked for in the name of some of the leading men of science, from different parts of the country." Just prior to the establishment of the Permanent Commission, Agassiz had written to Wilson suggesting that a "National Academy of Sciences" could be established and recommending that if Wilson were favorable, Bache, "to whom the scientific men of the country look as upon their leader…can draft in twenty four hours a complete plan for you…" On February 19, Agassiz came to Washington from Cambridge to accept appointment, upon Wilson's nomination, to the Board of Regents of the Smithsonian Institution. Agassiz went directly from the train to Bache's house, where he met with Bache, Wilson, and the scientists Benjamin Apthorp Gould and Benjamin Peirce. Working from plans laid out by Bache and Davis, the group drafted a bill for the establishment of a National Academy of Sciences, to be put before Congress. On February 20, Wilson introduced the bill in the Senate. Just before adjournment on March 3, 1863, Wilson asked the Senate "to take up a bill…to incorporate the National Academy of Sciences." The Senate passed the bill by voice vote; later that day it was sent to the House of Representatives, which passed it without comment. President Lincoln signed it into law before midnight that same day.

== Reconstruction and civil rights ==
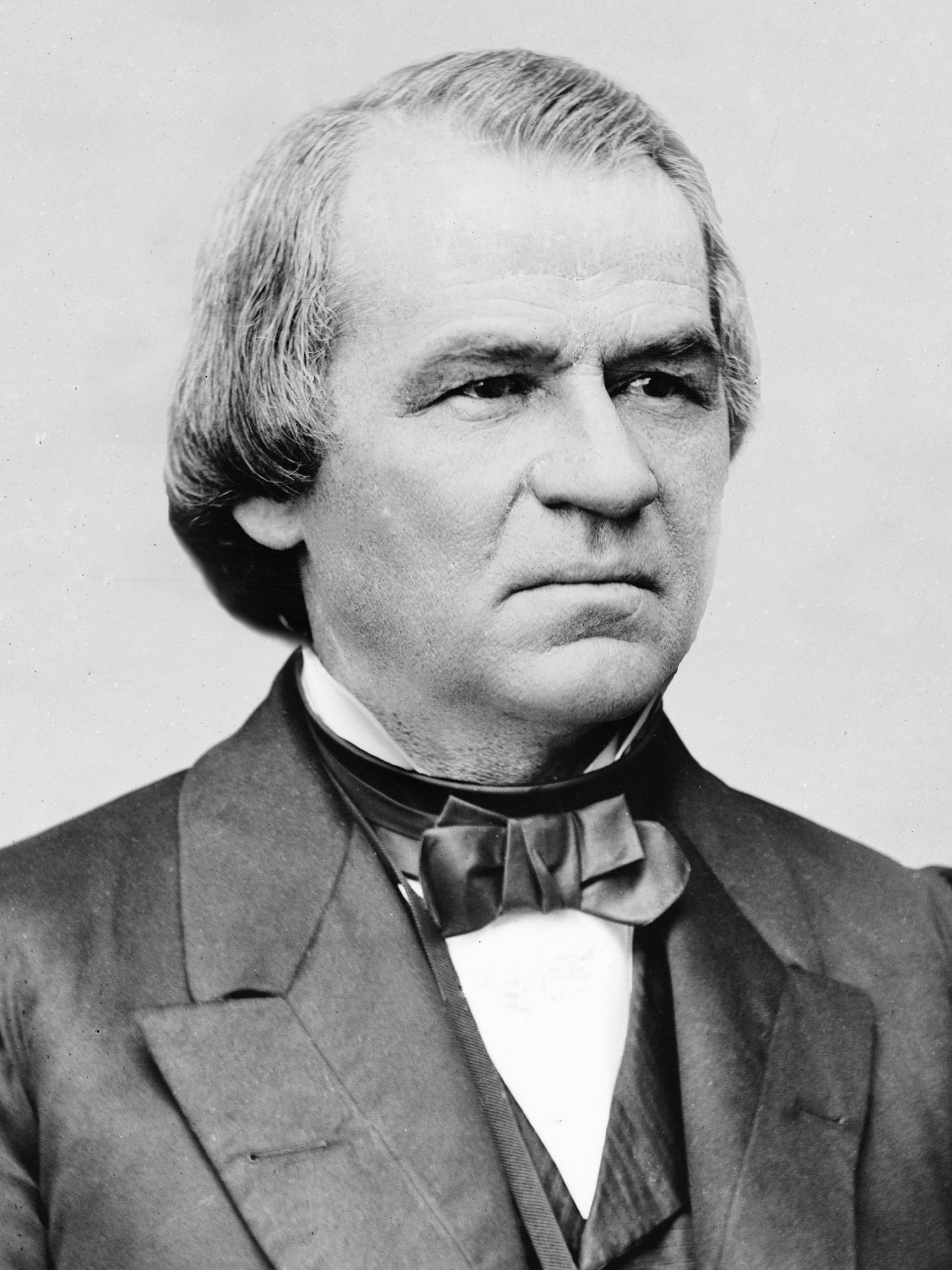
Wilson voted to convict President Andrew Johnson

When Andrew Johnson assumed the presidency after President Lincoln's assassination in April 1865, Senators Sumner and Wilson both hoped Johnson would support the policies of the Republican Party, since Johnson, a Democrat, had been elected with Lincoln on a pro-Union ticket. After the Civil War ended with a Union Victory in May 1865, the defeated former Confederacy was ruined. It had been devastated economically and politically, and much of its infrastructure had been destroyed during the war. The opportunity was ripe for Congress and Johnson to work together on terms for Southern restoration and reconstruction. Instead, Johnson launched his own reconstruction policy, which was seen as more lenient to former Confederates, and excluded African American citizenship. When Congress opened the session which began in December 1865, Johnson's policy included a demand for admission of Southern Senators and Representatives, nearly all Democrats, including many former Confederates. Congress, still in Republican hands, responded by refusing to allow the Southern Senators and Representatives to take their seats, beginning a rift between Republicans in Congress and the President. Wilson favored allowing only persons who had been loyal to the United States to serve in positions of political power in the former Confederacy, and believed that Congress, not the president, had the power to reconstruct the southern states. As a result, Wilson joined forces with the Congressmen and Senators known as Radical Republicans, those most strongly opposed to Johnson.

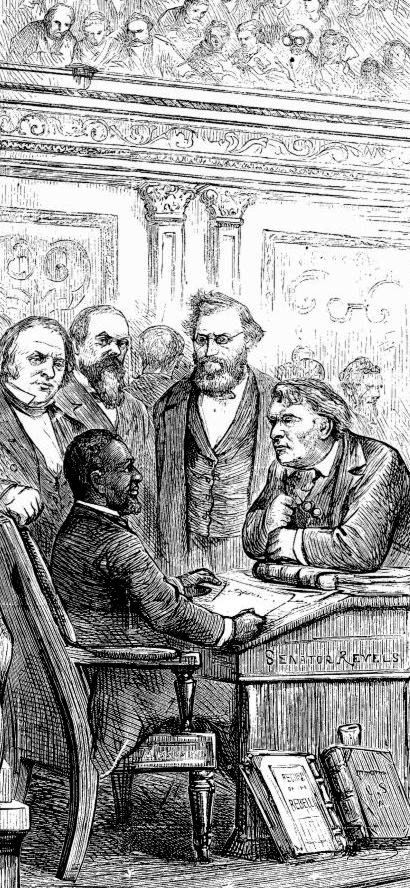
Henry Wilson (far left) defended Hiram Revels, the first African American U.S. Senator.

On December 21, 1865, two days after the announcement that the states had ratified the Thirteenth Amendment, which abolished slavery, Wilson introduced a bill to protect the civil rights of African Americans. Although Wilson's bill failed to pass Congress it was effectively the same bill as the Civil Rights Act of 1866 that passed Congress over Johnson's veto on April 9, 1866.

The rift between the Radicals, including Wilson, and President Johnson grew as Johnson attempted to implement his more lenient Reconstruction policies. Johnson vetoed the bill to establish the Freedmen's Bureau, as well as other Radical measures to protect African American civil rights—measures which Wilson supported. Wilson supported the effort to impeach Johnson, saying that Johnson was "unworthy, if not criminal" in his conduct by resisting Congressional Reconstruction measures, many of which were passed over his vetoes. At the 1868 Senate trial Wilson voted for Johnson's conviction, but Republicans fell one vote short of the two-thirds majority needed to remove Johnson from office. (With 36 "guilty" votes needed for removal, the Senate results were 35 to 19 on all three post-trial ballots.)

On May 27, 1868, Wilson spoke before the Senate to forcefully advocate the readmission of Arkansas. Taking the lead on this issue, Wilson urged immediate action, saying that the new state government was constitutional, and was composed of loyal Southerners, African Americans who were formerly enslaved, and Northerners who had moved south. Wilson said he would not agree to Congressional adjournment until all Southern states with reconstructed governments loyal to the United States that adopted new constitutions were readmitted. The New York Tribune called Wilson's speech "strong" and said that Wilson steered the Senate away from "legal hair-splitting". Within a month the Senate had acted, and Arkansas was readmitted on June 22, 1868. President Ulysses S. Grant, who succeeded Johnson in 1869, was more supportive of Congressional Reconstruction, and the remaining former Confederate states that had not rejoined the Union were readmitted during his first term. Federal troops continued to be based in the former Confederate states, allowing Republicans to control state governments, and African Americans to vote and hold federal office.

In 1870 Hiram Revels was elected to the U.S. Senate by the reconstructed Mississippi Legislature. Revels was the first African American elected to the Senate, and Senate Democrats attempted to prevent him from being seated. Wilson defended Revels's election, and presented as evidence of its validity signatures from the clerks of the Mississippi House of Representatives and Mississippi State Senate, as well as that of Adelbert Ames, the military Governor of Mississippi. Wilson argued that Revels's skin color was not a bar to Senate service, and connected the role of the Senate to Christianity's Golden Rule of doing to others as one would have done to oneself. The Senate voted to seat Revels, and after he took the oath of office Wilson personally escorted him to his desk as journalists recorded the historic event.

== 1868 vice presidential campaign ==
Prior to the presidential election of 1868, Wilson toured the South giving political speeches. Many in the press believed Wilson was promoting himself to be the Republican presidential candidate. Wilson, however, supported the Civil War hero General Ulysses S. Grant. During Reconstruction Grant supported Republican Congressional initiatives rather than President Johnson's, and during the dispute over the Tenure of Office Act which led to Johnson's impeachment, Grant served as temporary Secretary of War, but then returned the Department to Radical ally Edwin M. Stanton's control over Johnson's strong objection, making Grant a favorite to many Radicals.

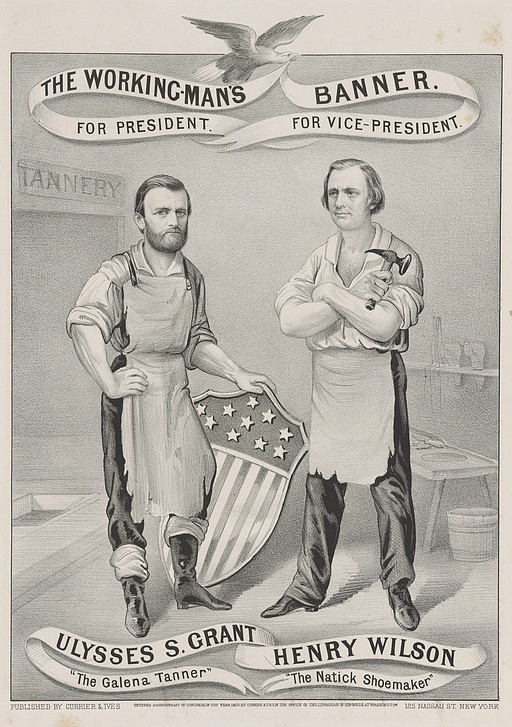
The working-man's banner. For President, Ulysses S. Grant, "The Galena Tanner." For Vice-President, Henry Wilson, "The Natick Shoemaker."

Wilson actually desired to be vice president. During his speech-making tour of the South, Wilson moderated his tougher Reconstruction ideology, advocating a biracial society, while urging African Americans and their white supporters to take a conciliatory and peaceful approach with Southern whites who had favored the Confederacy. Radicals, including Benjamin Wade, were stunned by Wilson's remarks, believing blacks should not be subject to their former white owners. At the Republican Convention, Wilson, Wade and others competed for the vice presidential nomination, and Wilson had support among Southern delegates, but he failed to win after five ballots. Wade was also unable to win the convention vote, and Wilson's delegates eventually switched their votes to Speaker of the House Schuyler Colfax, who won the nomination and went on to win the general election with Grant at the head of the ticket. After Grant and Colfax won the 1868 election Wilson declined to serve as Secretary of War in Grant's cabinet due to his desire to spend more time with Mrs. Wilson during her lengthy final illness.

== 1872 vice presidential campaign ==
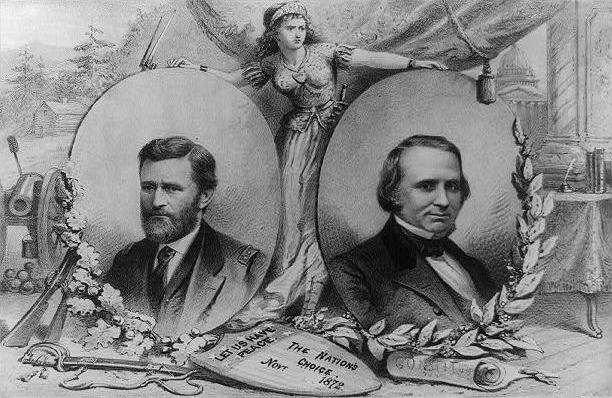
Grant/Wilson campaign poster

In 1872 Wilson had a strong reputation among Republicans as a principled but practical reformer who supported African American civil rights, voting rights for women, federal education aid, regulation of businesses, and prohibition of liquor. In 1870, incumbent Vice President Schuyler Colfax, said he would not run for another term, creating the possibility of a contested nomination. In addition, some Republicans, including Grant, desired another vice presidential nominee because they believed Colfax had presidential aspirations and might endanger Grant's reelection by bolting to the Liberal Republican Party, which had formed because of opposition to charges of corruption in the Grant administration and Grant's attempted Santo Domingo annexation. The Liberal Republican convention, held in Cincinnati in April, and headed by Carl Schurz, desired to replace Grant because of corruption in his administration, end Reconstruction, and return Southern state governments to white rule. They nominated Horace Greeley for president and B. Gratz Brown for vice president.

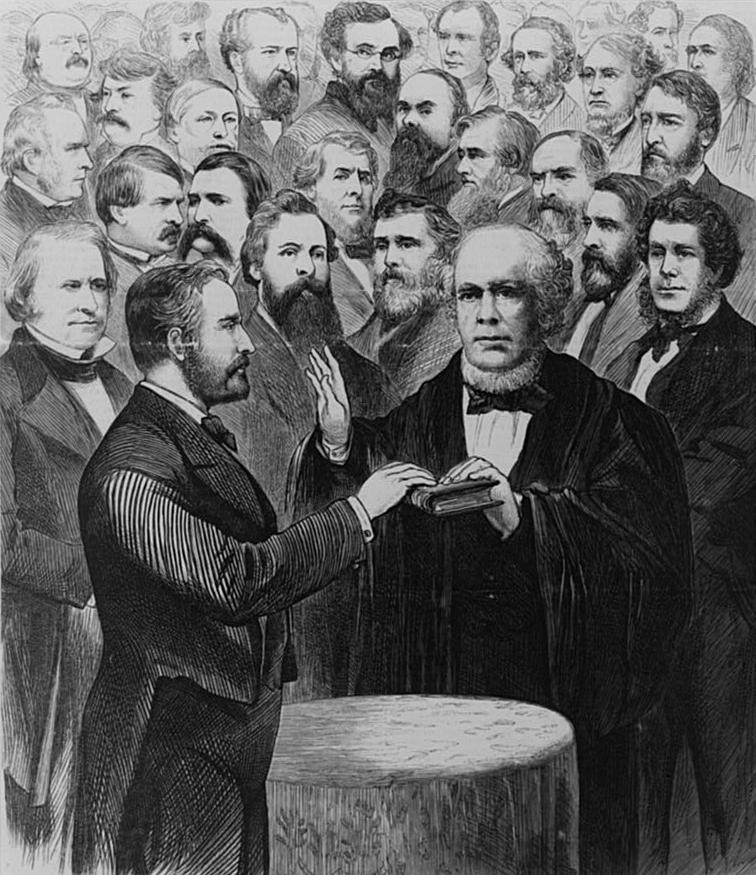
Wilson standing behind Grant at Grant's second Inauguration March 4, 1873

The Republican convention opened on June 5 in Philadelphia and the delegates were in an enthusiastic mood. For the first time in party convention history, telegraph operators communicated minute-by-minute proceedings to the nation. The Republican platform supported amnesty for former Confederates, low tariffs, civil service reform, Grant's Indian Peace policy, and civil rights for African Americans. Grant was unanimously renominated on the second day, to the loud cheers of the convention crowd. Wilson was popular among Republicans for the vice presidential nomination, with an appealing rags-to-riches story that included his rise from indentured servant to owner and operator of a successful shoe making business. On the first ballot, he defeated Colfax, who by then had become an active candidate by renouncing his 1870 pledge and informing his supporters that he would accept renomination if it was offered. The Republicans believed Wilson's nomination, as a politician of integrity coming from the anti-slavery movement, would outflank the anti-corruption argument of the Liberal Republicans, who counted Sumner among their members. Both Grant and his new running mate Wilson were idealized by Republican posters, which depicted Grant "the Galena Tanner" and Wilson "the Natick Shoemaker" carrying tools and wearing workmen's aprons. (Grant's father operated a tanning and leather goods manufacturing business, and before the Civil War Grant had clerked in his father's Galena, Illinois, store.) In July, in an unprecedented political party fusion influenced by Schurz, the Democrats adopted the Liberal Republican platform and endorsed that party's candidates. Grant's personal popularity proved insurmountable in the general election, and Grant and Wilson went on to overwhelmingly defeat Greeley and Brown in both the popular and electoral college votes. Wilson's nomination for Vice President had been intended to strengthen the Republican ticket, and was seen as a success.

=== Crédit Mobilier scandal ===
During the 1872 campaign, Wilson's reputation for honesty was marred by a September New York Sun article which indicated that he was involved in the Crédit Mobilier scandal. Wilson was one of several Representatives and Senators (mostly Republicans), including Colfax, who were offered (and possibly took) bribes of cash and discounted shares in the Union Pacific Railroad's Crédit Mobilier subsidiary from Congressman Oakes Ames during the late 1860s in exchange for votes favorable to the Union Pacific during the building of the First transcontinental railroad.

After denying to a reporter just a month before the election that he had a Crédit Mobilier connection, Wilson admitted involvement when he gave testimony before a Senate committee on February 13, 1873. Wilson told members of the investigating committee that in December 1867 he had agreed to purchase $2,000 (~$36,798 in 2024) in Crédit Mobilier stock (20 shares) using Mrs. Wilson's money and in her name. According to Wilson, his wife and he later had concerns about the propriety of the transaction and had never taken possession of the actual stock certificates, so Wilson asked Ames to cancel the transaction and Ames refunded the $2,000 purchase price to Wilson. Wilson said he then returned $814 to Ames – $748 in dividends and $66 in interest that Mrs. Wilson had supposedly earned as profits, even though she had not taken physical possession of her shares. Wilson further claimed that because Mrs. Wilson had refused to take these proceeds from Ames, Wilson took it upon himself to pay her $814 from his own funds to compensate her for the profit she would have made if she had kept the stock, which he said he felt obligated to do because his wife had originally agreed to purchase the stock on his recommendation, and had lost money by following his later recommendation to cancel the transaction.

Mrs. Wilson had died in 1870, so Senators had to rely on Wilson's word and that of Ames, who corroborated Wilson. The Senate accepted Wilson's explanation, and took no action against him, but his reputation for integrity was somewhat damaged because of his initial denial and later admission, though not sufficiently enough to prevent him from becoming vice president the following month.

== Vice presidency (1873–1875) ==
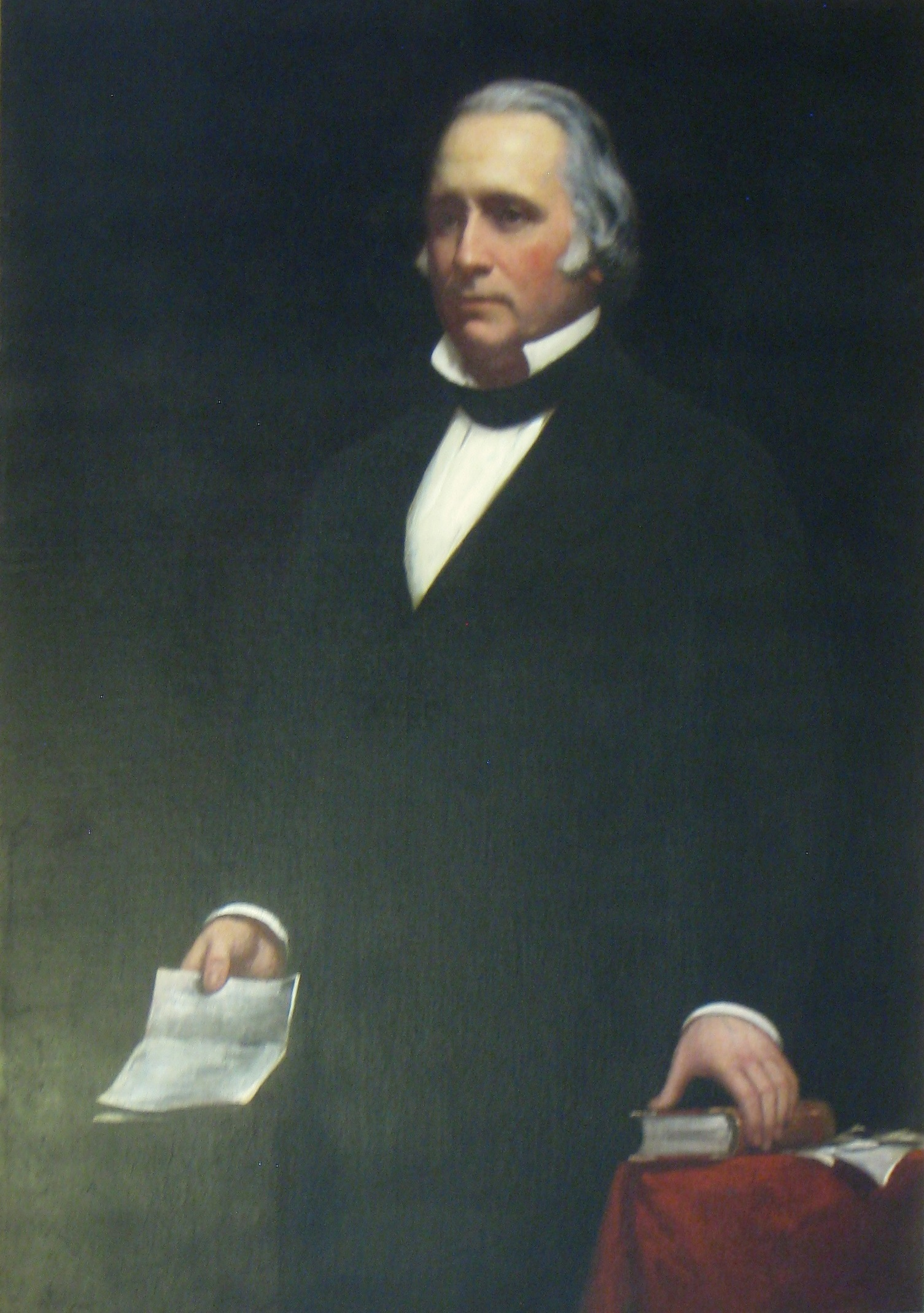
Vice President Wilson Onthank portrait, 1875

Wilson served as vice president from March 4, 1873, until his death. As vice president, Wilson's years of Senate experience enabled him to perform as a "highly efficient and acceptable" presiding officer. During his term he cast one tie-breaking vote, in favor of passing the Civil Rights Act of 1875. After his death, the office of vice president remained vacant since there was no constitutional provision to fill an intra-term vice-presidential vacancy until the Twenty-fifth Amendment in 1967. This meant that the Senate President Pro Tempore Thomas Ferry was now next in the line of presidential succession. Ferry remained next in succession until March 4, 1877.

=== Illness and death ===
Wilson's ceremonial duties and work on History of the Rise and Fall of the Slave Power in America kept him extremely busy, working late hours with little time to rest. In early May 1873, Wilson attended funeral services for Salmon P. Chase in New York City. On May 19, 1873, he suffered a stroke that caused paralysis in his face, general weakness, and impaired speech. His doctor ordered him to rest, but Wilson allowed reporters to see him. The public first took notice that Wilson was in ill health when he made an appearance in Boston on May 30, and reporters were informed that Wilson was unable to work or handle his correspondence. His health somewhat improved during September and October, and on November 25 Wilson returned to Washington for the opening of Congress. He was able to preside over the Senate from December 1 through December 9, 1873, but was unable to speak in public, including when he attended a Boston commemoration of the one hundredth anniversary of the Boston Tea Party.

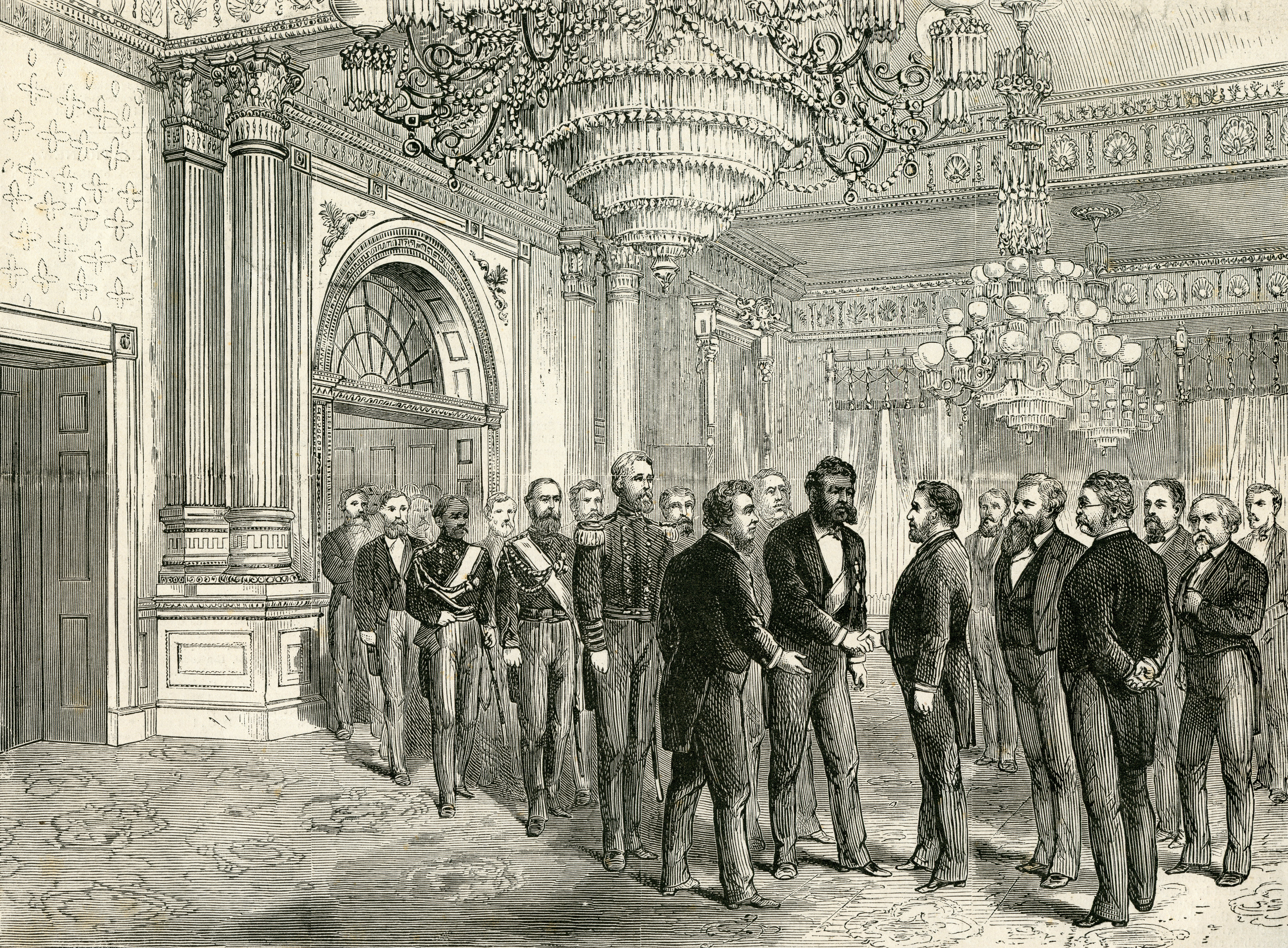
Wilson participated in the White House state dinner for Hawaiian King David Kalākaua in December 1874.

Wilson remained in occasional ill health into 1874, but was able to attend funeral services for Charles Sumner in March. Throughout his remaining tenure, Wilson's Senate attendance was irregular due to his continued poor health. During periods when he was not ill, Wilson was also able to resume some of his ceremonial duties, including participating in a White House party for the King of Hawaii, David Kalākaua, in December 1874. When Free Soil and abolitionist colleague Gerrit Smith died in New York City on December 28, 1874, Wilson traveled there to view the body and take part in funeral services.

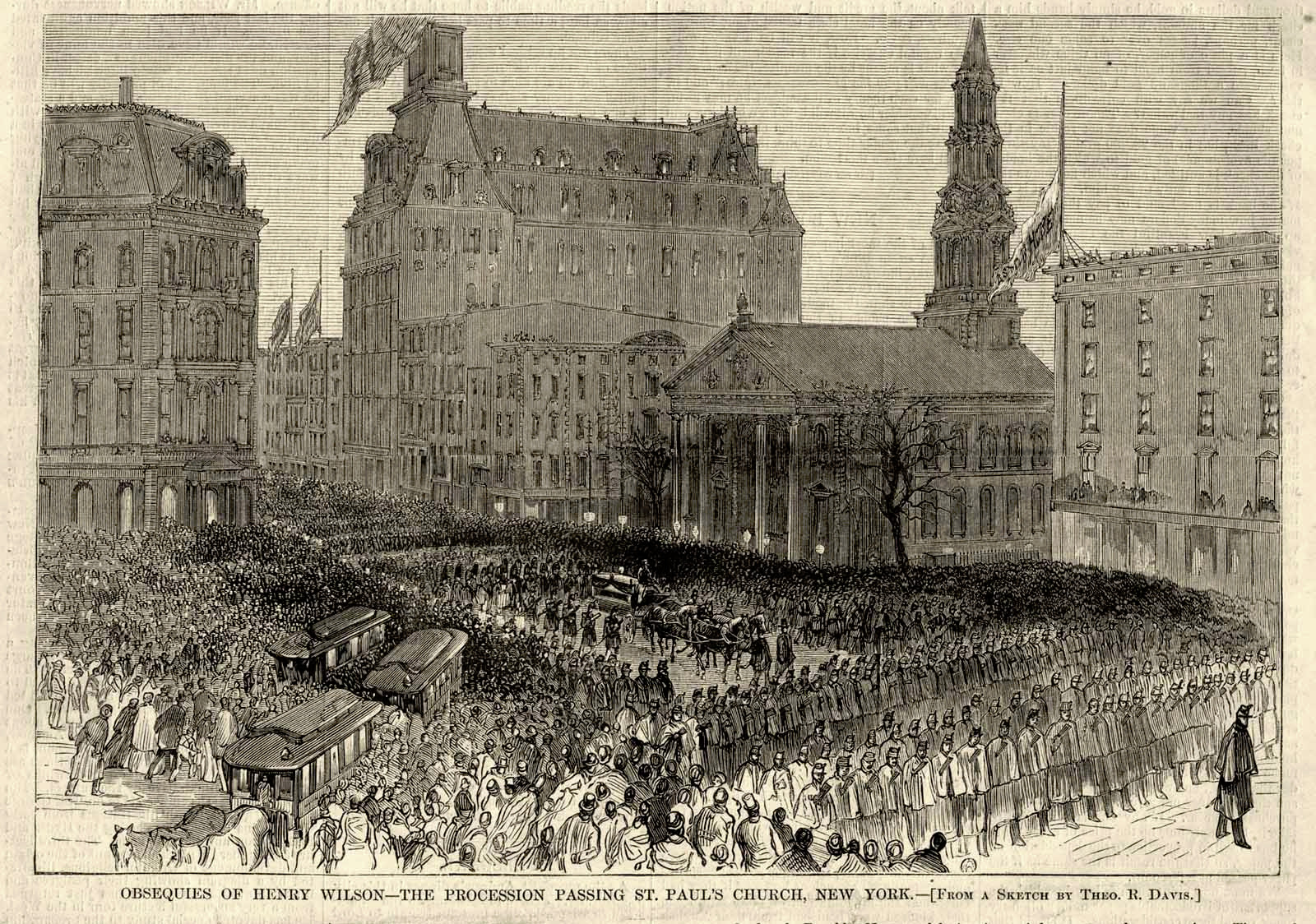
Wilson's funeral procession passing New York City's St. Paul's Chapel. Published in Harper's Weekly.

Wilson continued to go through bouts of ill health in 1875. While working at the United States Capitol on November 10, 1875, he suffered what was believed to be a minor stroke, and was taken to the Vice President's Room to recuperate. Over the next several days, his health appeared to improve and his friends thought he was nearly recovered. However, on November 22 at 7:20 am, Wilson suffered a fatal stroke while working at the Capitol. His remains were accorded the honor of lying in state at the United States Capitol rotunda.

The subsequent funeral arrangements included military escorts as Wilson's remains were transferred from one train station to another en route from Washington to Natick, as well as nights lying in state. The route included processions in Baltimore, Philadelphia, New York City, and Boston, and nights lying in state at Baltimore City Hall and Independence Hall in Philadelphia. He was interred at Old Dell Park Cemetery in Natick.

Wilson was the fourth vice president to die in office, following: George Clinton, who served under both Thomas Jefferson (1805–1809) and James Madison (1809–1812); Elbridge Gerry, who also served under Madison (1813–1814); and William R. King, under Franklin Pierce (1853).

== Historical reputation ==
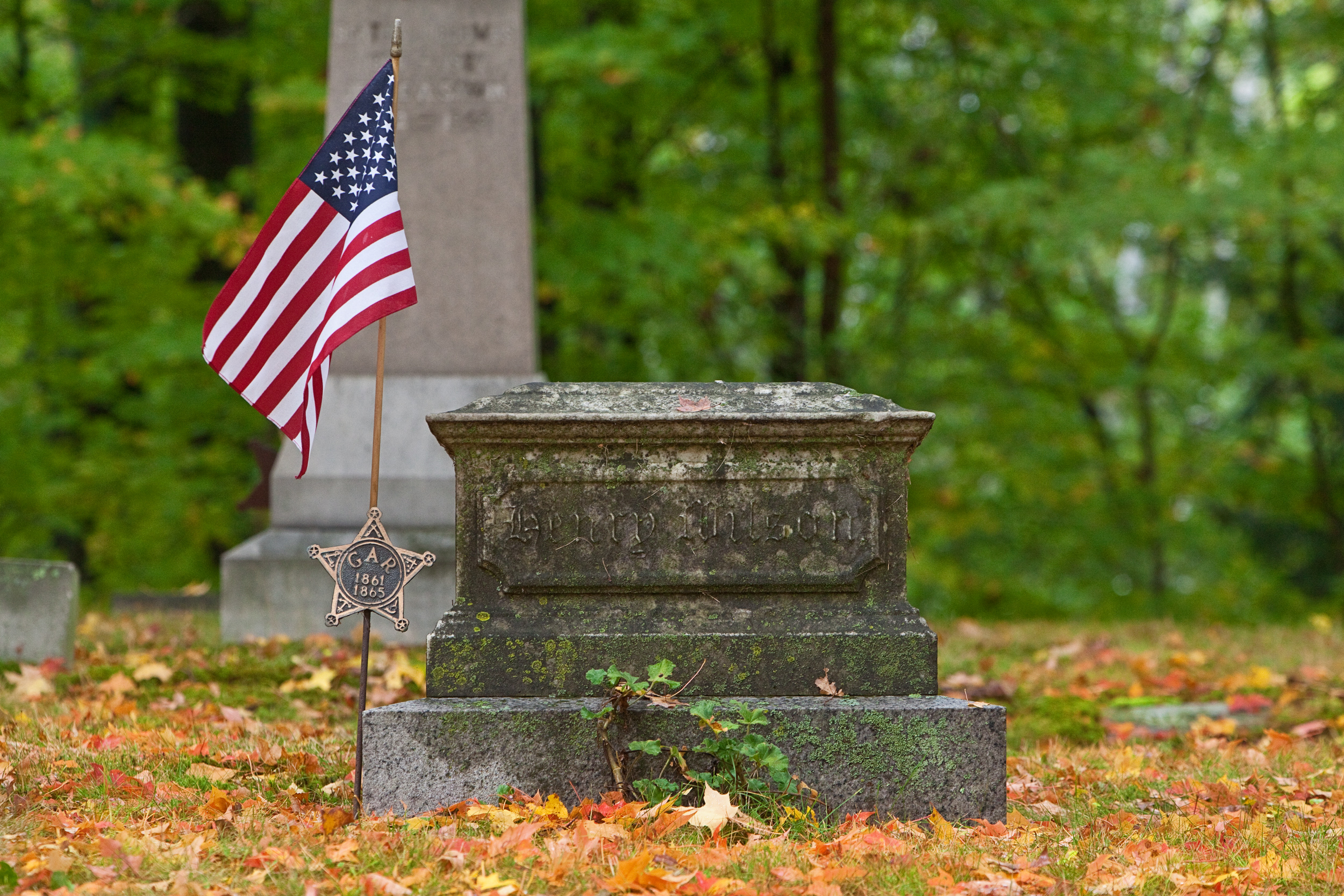
Grave of Henry Wilson, Old Dell Park Cemetery, Natick, Massachusetts.

According to historian George H. Haynes, during his nearly thirty years of public service Wilson practiced principled politics by championing unpopular causes, sometimes at the expense of his personal ambition. The causes Wilson supported included abolition of slavery, and the rights of workers, both black and white.

Wilson was not hesitant to sever ties with old guard politicians and form new coalitions in order to accomplish his objectives, even though this gave him the reputation among opponents of being a "shifty" politician. On the other hand, he was admired by fellow abolitionists for his lifelong dedication to the cause, and workingmen found inspiration in his career, since he had himself risen from a manual laborer's background.

Wilson supported free public schools and libraries. In Massachusetts he supported tax exemptions for the purchase and maintenance of worker's tools and furniture, and the removal of property qualifications for voting rights.

U.S. Senator George F. Hoar, a Massachusetts political contemporary, said Wilson was a "skilful, adroit, and practiced and constant political manager" and "the most skilled political organizer in the country" during his career.

Wilson is also recognized for being a political pioneer in techniques for determining public opinion while he held office. In the 20th century, the straw poll and scientific public opinion polls by companies including Gallup became standard parts of political campaigns and media coverage of elections. During his Senate career, Wilson pioneered straw polling by sampling the views of Massachusetts voters through in person conversations and unscientific written surveys before making his own views known. These efforts were credited with helping Wilson build coalitions, win elections, make political allies, and determine the best time to act in the Senate on issues of importance.

In 1891, the Henry Wilson school, a facility for black students, opened on what was then Central Street in the Washington County portion of the District of Columbia (now 17th Street in the Adams Morgan neighborhood). It was named for him in honor of his role emancipating the district's slaves. The school was closed in 1956 due to its small size, and shortly thereafter converted to the Morgan Annex, a satellite location of the adjacent Thomas P. Morgan School. The Morgan Annex was later closed; it was sold in 1989, and then reopened as the Morgan Annex Lofts condominiums.

Wilson was the subject of a biographical podcast in 2022 titled "Henry Wilson & The Civil War". The series had over 22 episodes and was hosted by Lincoln Anniballi.

== Personal life ==
On October 28, 1840, Wilson married Harriet Malvina Howe (1824–1870). They were the parents of a son, Henry Hamilton Wilson (1846–1866), who attended the Highland Military Academy in Worcester, Massachusetts. During the Civil War, the younger Wilson attended the United States Naval Academy, but left before graduating in order to accept a commission in the Union Army. He attained success in the 31st and 104th Regiments of United States Colored Troops, and was promoted to lieutenant colonel and second-in-command of the 104th in July 1865. After the war he accepted a commission as a second lieutenant in the regular Army's 6th Cavalry Regiment, and served until his death from a ruptured appendix in 1866. Camp Wilson, an Army post in Texas was named for Henry H. Wilson; it was later renamed Fort Griffin.

In 1869 Henry and Harriet Wilson also became the de facto adoptive parents of a girl, Evangelina (or Evangeline), who was born between 1864 and 1866, and took the name Eva Wilson. In a complicated series of events, in 1869 a woman named Caroline Vreeland met Nancy Colbath, wife of Wilson's brother Samuel. Vreeland allowed Nancy Colbath to adopt the child, with the understanding that she would be raised by Henry Wilson and his wife. The child lived with the Wilsons until shortly before Mrs. Wilson's death. Nancy Colbath then kept the child, and received monthly payments from Henry Wilson for her support. Details later emerged which indicated the likelihood that Vreeland had obtained a baby girl from an unknown parent or parents in Boston in 1866 so that her sister could use the baby to extort a man with whom she had had an affair. Vreeland went to prison for a stabbing in the early 1870s. The child continued to live with Wilson, and by 1874 he had asked Nancy Colbath to again be responsible for her. Wilson agreed to provide them a suitable home and financial support, but had not followed through by the time of his death

Wilson requested that the executor of his will, nephew William Leander Coolidge, use most of Wilson's estate to ensure that Wilson's mother in law was cared for, and that Eva receive an education and financial support. Wilson had given Coolidge oral instructions and letters, and the situation became complicated because Wilson's death occurred before he had incorporated these additional instructions into his will. Coolidge acted as a trustee for Eva, and by 1889, when she was more than 21 years old, she claimed she was entitled to the remainder of Wilson's estate. Other Wilson family members disagreed; because of the complexity of the details, Coolidge petitioned the Massachusetts courts for guidance. The courts found in favor of Eva, by then married and known as Eva Carpenter, and she received most of the estate, which was valued at approximately $10,000 (about $239,000 in 2021).

== Bibliography ==
- Wilson, Henry (1864). History of the Anti-Slavery Measures of the Thirty-seventh and Thirty-eighth Congresses, 1861–64. Boston: Walker, Wise, and Company.
- Wilson, Henry (1868). History of the Reconstruction Measures of the Thirty-ninth and Fortieth Congresses, 1865–68. Hartford, Connecticut: Hartford Publishing Company.
- Wilson, Henry (1872). History of the Rise and Fall of the Slave Power in America. Vol. 1. Boston: Houghton Mifflin Company.
- Wilson, Henry (1874). History of the Rise and Fall of the Slave Power in America. Vol. 2. Boston: Houghton Mifflin Company.
- Wilson, Henry; Hunt, Rev. Samuel (1877). History of the Rise and Fall of the Slave Power in America. Vol. 3. Boston: James R. Osgood and Company. ISBN 978-0837112930. Reverend Samuel Hunt completed Volume 3 after Wilson's death.

== See also ==
- Henry Wilson Shoe Shop
- Martin Delany and Thornton Chase also in the 104th USCI
- New Hampshire Historical Marker No. 98: Henry Wilson-Vice President of the United States

== Sources ==
=== Books ===
- Abbott, Richard H. (1965). Cobbler in Congress: Life of Henry Wilson, 1812–1875. Vol. 1. Madison: University of Wisconsin—Madison. p. 8.
- Abbott, Richard H. (1965). Cobbler in Congress: Life of Henry Wilson, 1812–1875. Vol. 2. Madison: University of Wisconsin—Madison. p. 353.
- Abbott, Richard H. (1972). Cobbler in Congress: The Life of Henry Wilson, 1812–1875. Lexington: University Press of Kentucky. ISBN 978-0-8131-1249-7. "school teacher."
- Blue, Frederick J. (1987). Salmon P. Chase: A Life in Politics. Kent, OH: Kent University Press. p. 319. ISBN 978-0-87338-340-0.
- Bolino, August C. (2012). Men of Massachusetts: Bay State Contributors to American Society. iUniverse. pp. 77–78. ISBN 978-1475933765.
- Coffey, Walter (2014). The Reconstruction Years: The Tragic Aftermath of the War Between the States. Bloomington, IN: AuthorHouse, LLC. p. 128. ISBN 978-1-4918-5192-0.
- Diller, Daniel C. (1996). Nelson, Michael (ed.). Guide to the Presidency. New York City: Routledge. ISBN 1-56802-018-X.
- Foner, Eric (1995). Free Soil, Free Labor, Free Men: The Ideology of the Republican Party before the Civil War. New York: Oxford University Press. p. 113. ISBN 978-0-1997-6226-2.
- Garrison, William Lloyd; Merrill, Walter M. (1979). The Letters of William Lloyd Garrison: Let the Oppressed Go Free, 1861–1867. Cambridge, MA: Harvard University Press. p. 141. ISBN 978-0-6745-2665-5.
- Giddings, Edward J. (1889). American Christian Rulers: Or, Religion and Men of Government. New York: Bromfield & Co. p. 551.
- Hatfield, Mark O.; Senate Historical Office (1997). Vice Presidents of the United States, 1789–1993 Henry Wilson (1873–1875) (PDF). Washington D.C.: U.S. Government Printing Office. pp. 233–239. Archived (PDF) from the original on October 9, 2022.
- Haynes, George H. (1936). Malone, Dumas (ed.). Dictionary of American Biography Henry Wilson. New York City: Charles Scribner's Sons. pp. 322–325.
- Heitman, Francis B. (1903). Historical Register and Dictionary of the United States Army. Vol. 1. Washington, D.C.: Government Printing Office. OCLC 1200947.
- "The Natick Cobbler". Hide & Leather: The International Weekly; Shoe Factories – Tanneries – Allied Industries. Chicago, Illinois: Hide and Leather Publishing Co.: 36 June 21, 1919.
- McKay, Ernest A. (1971). Henry Wilson: Practical Radical; A Portrait of a Politician. Port Washington, NY: Kennikat Press. pp. 11, 16, 233. ISBN 978-0-8046-9010-2.
- McFeely, William S. (1974). Woodward, C. Vann (ed.). Responses of the Presidents to Charges of Misconduct. New York: Delacorte Press. pp. 133–162. ISBN 0-440-05923-2.
- Miller, Richard F. (2013). States at War: A Reference Guide for Connecticut, Maine, Massachusetts, New Hampshire, Rhode Island and Vermont in the Civil War. Vol. 1. Hanover, NH: University Press of New England. pp. 264, 267. ISBN 978-1-61168-324-0.
- Myers, John L. (2009). Henry Wilson and the Era of Reconstruction. Lanham, Maryland: University Press of America, Inc. ISBN 978-0-7618-4742-7.
- Myers, John L. (2005). Henry Wilson and the Coming of the Civil War. Lanham, Maryland: University Press of America. p. 8. ISBN 978-0-7618-2608-8.
- Myers, John L. "The Writing of History of the Rise and Fall of the Slave Power in America," Civil War History, June 1985, Vol. 31, Issue 2, pp. 144–162.
- Nason, Elias; Russell, Thomas (1876). The Life and Public Services of Henry Wilson, Late Vice-President of the United States. Boston: B.B. Russell.
- New Hampshire Adjutant General (1868). Annual Report. Manchester, NH: John B. Clarke. p. 203.
- Puleo, Stephen (2011). A City So Grand: The Rise of an American Metropolis: Boston 1850–1900. Boston: Beacon Press. p. Chapter 9. ISBN 978-0-8070-0149-3.
- Richards, Leonard L. (2007). The California Gold Rush and the Coming of the Civil War. New York City: Vintage Books Random House Inc. ISBN 978-0-307-27757-2.
- Scales, John (1914). History of Strafford County, New Hampshire and Representative Citizens. Chicago, Illinois: Richmond-Arnold Publishing Company. p. 501.
- Shelden, Rachel A. (2013). Washington Brotherhood: Politics, Social Life, and the Coming of the Civil War. Chapel Hill: University of North Carolina Press. pp. 31–32. ISBN 978-1-4696-1085-6.
- Thayer, William M. (1895). Turning Points in Successful Careers. New York: Thomas Y. Crowell & Company. p. 253.
- The National Cyclopedia of American Biography. Vol. IV. New York: James T. White & Company. 1895. p. 14.
- Uglow, Loyd M. (2001). Standing in the Gap: Army Outposts, Picket Stations, and the Pacification of the Texas Frontier, 1866–1886. Fort Worth: Texas Christian University Press. p. 106. ISBN 978-0-87565-246-7.
- United States Congressional Serial Set. Washington, DC: U.S. Government Printing Office. 1913. p. 1125.
- Wilson, Henry (1872–1877). History of the Rise and Fall of the Slave Power in America, 3 vols. (Boston: J. R. Osgood and Co.)
- Winks, William Edward (1883). Lives of Illustrious Shoemakers. London: Sampson Lowe, Marston, Searle & Rivington. p. 362.
- White, Ronald C. (2016). American Ulysses: A Life of Ulysses S. Grant. Random House Publishing Group. ISBN 978-1-58836-992-5.

=== Newspapers ===
- "Democratic Illiberality". Hornellsville Weekly Tribune. Hornelsville, NY. June 24, 1858. p. 3 – via Newspapers.com.
- "Senators Gwin and Wilson". Washington Union. Washington, DC. July 4, 1858. p. 2.
- "The Grave (From the Boston Traveler)". Atlanta Constitution. Atlanta, GA. December 2, 1875. p. 1 – via Newspapers.com.
- "Current events: George A. Colbath, a brother of the late ex-Vice President Henry Wilson, died at Natick, Massachusetts". Logansport Pharos-Tribune. Logansport, IN. November 21, 1894. p. 2 – via Newspapers.com.

=== The New York Times ===
- "Brooks and Senator Wilson" (PDF). The New York Times. June 7, 1856.
- "Credit Mobilier Senator Wilson" (PDF). The New York Times. February 14, 1873.
- "Henry Wilson's Funeral: Burial at Dell Park Cemetery". The New York Times. New York. December 2, 1875. p. 5 – via Newspapers.com.

=== Primary ===
- "Republican Party Platform of 1872". The American Presidency Project. June 5, 1872.

Party political offices
| Preceded by Horace Mann | Free Soil nominee for Governor of Massachusetts; 1853, 1854 | Last |
| Preceded by Schuyler Colfax | Republican nominee for Vice President of the United States; 1872 | Succeeded by William A. Wheeler |
U.S. Senate
| Preceded by Julius Rockwell | U.S. Senator (Class 2) from Massachusetts; 1855–1873; Served alongside: Charles Sumner | Succeeded by George S. Boutwell |
| Preceded by Jefferson Davis | Chair of the Senate Military Affairs Committee; 1861–1873 | Succeeded by John A. Logan |
Political offices
| Preceded by Schuyler Colfax | Vice President of the United States; 1873–1875 | Succeeded by William A. Wheeler |
Honorary titles
| Preceded by Charles Sumner | Persons who have lain in state or honor in the United States Capitol rotunda November 25, 1875 – November 26, 1875 | Succeeded by James Garfield |
