= 1854 Massachusetts gubernatorial election =

- November 15, 1854
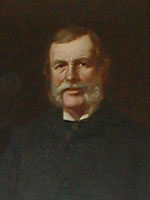

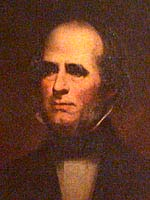

Nominee	Henry J. Gardner	Emory Washburn	Henry W. Bishop
Party	Know Nothing	Whig	Democratic
Popular vote	81,503	27,279	13,742
Percentage	62.58%	20.94%	10.55%
- County results Gardner: 40–50% 50–60% 60–70% Washburn: 40–50%
Governor before election
Emory Washburn
Whig
Elected Governor
Henry J. Gardner
Know Nothing

The 1854 Massachusetts gubernatorial election was held on November 15. American Party candidate Henry J. Gardner was elected to his first term as governor, defeating incumbent Whig governor Emory Washburn.

Future senator and vice president of the United States Henry Wilson also ran as a candidate for the new Massachusetts Republican Party. This marks the first campaign in which the new party participated following its founding on Worcester Common in September.

The election was also the first after the 1853 legislature repealed the secret ballot law passed a few years earlier, returning the state to public balloting.

== Background ==
Following the collapse of the coalition government and defeat of the coalition's proposed constitution in 1853, political reform in Massachusetts appeared to be at a low ebb. However, a major realignment of the rank-and-file members of every party had already begun in secret, in the form of the Know Nothing movement, known publicly as "Sam." Know Nothing lodges allowed entry to all native-born, adult male Protestants willing to abandon party ties. The ad hoc Native American Party was established as the political wing of the movement and controlled directly by its members at the local level, a novel experiment in political organization for the time. Members emphasized opposition to immigration and Catholicism and support for temperance and organized (native) labor. They were united in a belief that the American elite had failed to address novel concerns brought by industrialization.

The movement entered state politics in the spring 1854 municipal elections, when candidates running on independent "Citizens" tickets swept the Whig Party strongholds of Boston, Roxbury, and Cambridge. Running for mayor of Boston, Jerome V. C. Smith received the largest vote in history. The Boston Post described his coalition as "composed of as many colors as Joseph's coat–abolitionists, free-soilers, Whigs, 'Native Americans', a few democrats etc.—one of the most reprehensible coalitions that we have had since the one that defeated the proposed new constitution." Over the summer, the movement won local elections in Chelsea, Lynn, Marblehead, Waltham, Stoneham, and other towns. In Salem, another Whig city, the movement ran a machinist and won over 70 percent of the vote.

In 1853 and 1854, the Free Soil Party in several states had joined with anti-slavery Democrats and Whigs to form a new Republican Party. In July, the Massachusetts Free Soil Party attempted likewise with an abortive "People's Convention," but the proposal failed to attract Whig or Democratic support. The confident Whigs counter-proposed that anti-slavery activists should simply join their party. Behind closed doors, most were joining the Know Nothings.

== Conventions ==
The party conventions, held for the purpose of nominating candidates and ratifying party platforms for the fall campaign, are listed in chronological order.

=== Whig ===
In August, the Whig Party met in convention at the Boston Music Hall. Continuing the themes of their 1853 campaign, they promoted themselves as reformers and embraced several constitutional amendments culled from the failed constitution. They passed resolutions denouncing the Kansas–Nebraska Act and calling for restoration of the Missouri Compromise, a ban on further extension of slavery into the territories, and repeal of the Fugitive Slave Act. The platform also appealed to nativists by excoriating the Franklin Pierce administration for appointing foreigners "to the exclusion of native citizens of highest reputation and lofty patriotism." Emory Washburn was re-nominated.

=== Republican and Free Soil ===
On September 7, the new Republican Party, formed from a small remnant of the state Free Soil Party, held their founding convention on Worcester Common. Charles Sumner spoke in favor of the new party. Another speaker referred to the coming campaign as one that would pit "Slavery, Romanism, and Rum [against] Freedom, Protestantism, and Temperance."

The party adopted a platform opposing the acquisition of Cuba or any other territory without a free vote of its residents, denouncing the arrest of Anthony Burns, and pledging "to make the question of freedom paramount to all other political questions." The platform proposed the repeal of the Fugitive Slave Act and the prohibition of slavery in all future territories and states. At the formal Free Soil convention in Springfield on October 17, the party voted to disband and endorse the Republican ticket.

==== Candidates ====
All of the candidates were considered free-soilers except Samuel Hoar, though he had founded the Free Soil Party.

- Nathaniel Prentiss Banks, U.S. representative from Waltham
- Ebenezer Rockwood Hoar, judge of the Court of Common Pleas
- Samuel Hoar, former U.S. representative from Concord
- Stephen C. Phillips, former U.S. representative and mayor of Salem
- Henry Wilson, former president of the Massachusetts Senate and Free Soil candidate for governor in 1853

==== Results ====
1854 Massachusetts Republican convention
Party	Candidate	Votes	%
Republican	Henry Wilson	316	65.83%
Republican	Stephen C. Phillips	68	14.17%
Republican	Ebenezer Rockwood Hoar	48	10.00%
Republican	Samuel Hoar	38	7.92%
Republican	Nathaniel Banks	5	1.04%
Republican	Scattering	5	1.04%
Total votes		480	100.00%

Henry Wilson, whose association with the Know Nothings was public knowledge, won a majority on the first ballot. His nomination exposed fissures between the abolitionist elite and rank-and-file, many of whom had already fully joined the Know Nothing movement. Upon Wilson's nomination, judge Charles Allen took the floor to launch a blistering attack against Wilson and the Know Nothings. Allen introduced a movement to revoke the nomination, which failed. Allen ran in the general election on an independent ticket.

Increase Sumner of Great Barrington, an anti-slavery Democrat, was nominated for lieutenant governor.

=== Democratic ===
On September 26, the Democratic Party held their convention in Lowell. Isaac Adams was elected president with 297 out of 553 votes. Perennial nominee Henry Bishop was re-nominated by acclamation, despite his letter declining.

The platform endorsed the national Democratic platform of 1852, the Pierce administration, the principle of democratic self-government, and a recent act of Congress "changing the superintendence of our National armories from the military to the civil," and the freedom of religion.

=== Native American ===
On October 18, the Native American Party held their first convention at Tremont Temple in Boston. Despite the party's populist roots and membership, the proceedings were dominated by professional politicians. Henry Gardner, former president of the Boston Common Council, served as president.

Political rivals and the press were barred from the proceedings, though some informants were planted among the delegates. More than 1,500 delegates were in attendance.

Gardner, who was a leading candidate, reassured delegates that he was "an anti-slavery man, and... a temperance man of fifteen years standing." With no access to the proceedings, Gardner's opponents were unable to inform the delegates that he enjoyed brandy and had a long record as a "pro-slavery, Fugitive Slave Law, [Daniel] Webster Whig." Henry Wilson, who already had the endorsement of the Republican and Free Soil parties, also sought the nomination.

==== Candidates ====
- Simon Brown, publisher of the New England Farmer
- Nahum F. Bryant
- Henry J. Gardner, businessman and former president of the Boston Common Council
- Eli Thayer, founder of the Oread Institute and Massachusetts Emigrant Aid Company
- Marshall Pinckney Wilder, merchant, amateur horticulturalist, and former president of the Massachusetts Senate
- Henry Wilson, former president of the Massachusetts Senate (Republican and Free Soil nominee)
- Ephraim M. Wright, secretary of the Commonwealth

=== Balloting ===
1854 Native American Party Convention
Ballot	1	2	3	4
Gardner	0	0	396	623
Bryant	80	333	254	181
Wright	180	222	109	27
Thayer	0	113	67	24
Wilder	343	109	43	0
Wilson	66	0	0	0
Brown	66	0	0	0
Total	968	1,206	944	988

After the contentious first ballot, Henry Wilson withdrew from consideration and a motion was passed disqualifying any person who had joined the party within the prior month, effectively eliminating Marshall Wilder as well. The New York Times reported on accusations that the Boston Whig Party had inordinate influence at the convention.

After balloting was concluded, the party secretary was instructed to misinform Boston newspapers as to which candidates had been nominated. Some in the movement, especially early adopters, were aggrieved that the party had given choice nominations to "political stock-jobbers and curbstone brokers." Nevertheless, the slate remained a secret until late October.

== General election ==
=== Candidates ===
- Charles Allen, judge and former U.S. representative from Boston (Independent Free Soil)
- Henry W. Bishop, candidate for governor in 1852 and 1853 (Democratic)
- Henry J. Gardner, businessman and former member of the Boston City Council (Native American)
- Bradford L. Wales, candidate for governor in 1853 (Democratic-Hunker)
- Emory Washburn, incumbent governor (Whig)

==== Withdrew ====
- Henry Wilson, former president of the Massachusetts Senate and candidate for governor in 1853 (Free Soil, Republican)

=== Campaign ===
Despite the rapid decay of the party's rank-and-file, Whig Party leadership remained ignorant of the strength of the Know Nothing movement. Following the party convention, The Boston Advertiser trumpeted, "We do not recollect a time at this season of the year when the prospects were fairer for a successful result of the Autumnal election. If a judicious course is pursued by the Whig party, they are sure of an honorable triumph."

With the Native American ticket being withheld from the press until a week before the election, most of the campaign was largely conducted on their terms: behind closed doors at the local level.

By the time the slate became public in October, most observers acknowledged that Gardner had a strong chance of victory, though some Whigs held out hope that his nomination would sink the movement. Gardner himself was especially confident, telling one Whig newspaperman, "You had better not abuse me as you are abusing me in the Atlas. I shall be elected by a very large majority."

One issue in the brief public campaign was the Fugitive Slave Act. The abolitionist candidates, Allen and Wilson, both strongly opposed it, and Allen charged Gardner with having supported it, which he denied. Gardner publicly called for the repeal or modification of the law and said that he had, in the past, favored a fusion between the Whig and Free Soil parties.

A few days before the election, Wilson wrote to the Republican state committee asking to have his name removed from the ticket. With no time to reprint ballots, his name remained on the ballot, but his withdrawal obliterated any independent abolitionist vote. In his memoirs, Wilson credited his withdrawal to a belief that only Gardner could upend the elite establishment. (In reality, Wilson had been a member of the movement since March.) Accusations of opportunism would hound Wilson into his January 1855 campaign for U.S. Senate.

=== Results ===
1854 Massachusetts gubernatorial election
Party	Candidate	Votes	%	±%
Know Nothing	Henry J. Gardner	81,503	62.58%	N/A
Whig	Emory Washburn (incumbent)	27,279	20.94%	▼25.00
Democratic	Henry W. Bishop	13,742	10.55%	▼16.67
Republican	Henry Wilson (withdrew)	6,483	4.98%	▼17.53
Free Soil	Charles Allen	477	0.37%	N/A
National Democratic	Bradford L. Wales	477	0.37%	▼3.88
Write-in		288	0.22%	▲0.13
Total votes		130,249	100.00%	
Know Nothing gain from Whig		Swing		

On election day, November 15, Massachusetts was under a rainstorm. The Know Nothings won a historic victory. Gardner's margin was the largest in state history by percentage (among competitive elections) and raw vote. He carried every city and all but twenty towns, sweeping all regions of the state and erasing old sectarian boundaries. Every state officer, every U.S. representative, every state senator, and all but three of the 379 state representatives elected in 1854 had been endorsed by the movement.

Despite the rain, the Know Nothings celebrated their victory on Boston Common with fireworks and cannons. Gardner addressed the crowd, "Whatever may be the result elsewhere in the state—of which I know nothing [laughter]—we can proudly say that in Boston our principles—and they are American principles—are triumphant."

The Whig and Free Soil establishment was deeply shocked by the result. Charles Francis Adams Sr., who had expected a Know Nothing victory, wrote, "There has been no revolution so complete since the organization of government." Edward Everett thought the election was "the most astonishing result ever witnessed in our politics" and wrote to Robert C. Winthrop, "What a political overturn!" Winthrop himself voiced grief for "poor old Massachusetts."

== See also ==
- 1854 Massachusetts legislature
