= 1855 United States Senate special election in Massachusetts =

- January 23 and 31, 1855

40 members of the Massachusetts Senate 396 members of the Massachusetts House Majority vote of both houses needed to win
Nominee	Henry Wilson
Party	Know Nothing
Senate	21
Percentage	52.5%
House	234
Percentage	57.8%
[[List of United States senators from {{{country}}}|U.S. senator]] before election
Julius Rockwell
Whig
Elected U.S. senator
Henry Wilson
Know Nothing

The 1855 United States Senate special election in Massachusetts was held during January 1855. Henry Wilson was elected to fill the remainder of the term left vacant by the resignation of Edward Everett.

Everett had resigned in 1854 over poor health and protest following his failure to vote against the Kansas-Nebraska Act. Prior to the election, Julius Rockwell had been appointed to the seat on an interim basis.

At the time, Massachusetts elected United States senators by a majority vote of each separate house of the Massachusetts General Court, the House and the Senate.

== Background ==
In 1854, the anti-immigration, anti-slavery American Party (better known as Know-Nothings) swept the Massachusetts elections, taking nearly every seat in the legislature.

=== American Party caucus ===
Henry Wilson was nominated as the American Party candidate in a legislative caucus on January 13. Most of the House participated; none of the Senators did.

First informal American Party caucus
Party	Candidate	Votes	%
Know Nothing	Henry Wilson	178	50.42%
Know Nothing	Alfred H. Ely	50	14.16%
Know Nothing	Julius Rockwell (incumbent)	45	12.75%
Know Nothing	Alexander Bullock	22	6.23%
Know Nothing	Nahum F. Bryant	16	4.53%
Know Nothing	Nathaniel P. Banks	14	3.97%
Know Nothing	Charles Woodward Stearns	8	2.27%
Others	Scattering	20	5.67%
Total votes		353	100.00%

Second formal American Party caucus
Party	Candidate	Votes	%
Know Nothing	Henry Wilson	200	57.80%
Know Nothing	Alfred B. Ely	57	16.47%
Know Nothing	Alexander Bullock	30	8.67%
Know Nothing	Julius Rockwell (incumbent)	27	7.80%
Know Nothing	Nahum F. Bryant	12	3.47%
Know Nothing	Nathaniel P. Banks	4	1.16%
Others	Scattering	16	4.62%
Total votes		346	100.00%

=== Opposition to Wilson ===
Following Wilson's endorsement by the caucus, public opposition was aroused against his election. On January 15, a printed circular called for a caucus of "all members in the House who believe in the freedom of debate, who refuse to sanction a high-handed course of political action, and who are opposed to the election of Hon. Henry Wilson to the United States Senate." The opposition caucus met and endorsed Alexander Bullock for Senator.

== Election in the House ==
Much of the debate in the House surrounded Wilson's loyalty to the American Party, or his lack thereof. Wilson had been the Free Soil Party candidate for governor in 1854 but aligned himself with the nativist Know Nothing movement after their sweeping victory, in an effort to strengthen the party's emphasis on opposition to slavery. (The Free Soil Party had been dissolved into the new Republican Party.)

On January 23, the House convened and elected Wilson on the first ballot. His candidacy was then sent to the Senate for ratification.

1855 U.S. Senate special election in the House
Party	Candidate	Votes	%
Know Nothing	Henry Wilson	234	57.80%
Know Nothing	Nahum F. Bryant	85	23.35%
Whig	Julius Rockwell (incumbent)	18	7.80%
Unknown	Alfred B. Ely	9	2.47%
Know Nothing	Charles A. Phelps	3	2.27%
Unknown	Jonathan Pierce	3	0.09%
Republican	John G. Palfrey	3	0.09%
Democratic	George S. Boutwell	2	0.06%
Know Nothing	Nathaniel P. Banks	1	0.03%
Unknown	S. M. Copeland	1	0.03%
Republican	Samuel Hoar	1	0.03%
Whig	Ephraim M. Wright	1	0.03%
Democratic	Henry W. Bishop	1	0.03%
Republican	Richard Henry Dana Jr.	1	0.03%
Unknown	Mr. Luscom	1	0.03%
Total votes		364	100.00%

== Election in the Senate ==
On January 31, the State Senate convened and ratified the House's choice of Wilson.

1855 U.S. Senate election in the Senate
Party	Candidate	Votes	%
Know Nothing	Henry Wilson	21	55.26%
Whig	Ephraim M. Wright	14	36.84%
Scattering	Others	4	10.53%
Total votes		38	100.00%

== Aftermath ==
Wilson joined Samuel Hoar's new anti-slavery Republican Party upon entering the Senate.
