= Eliphalet Trask =

American politician

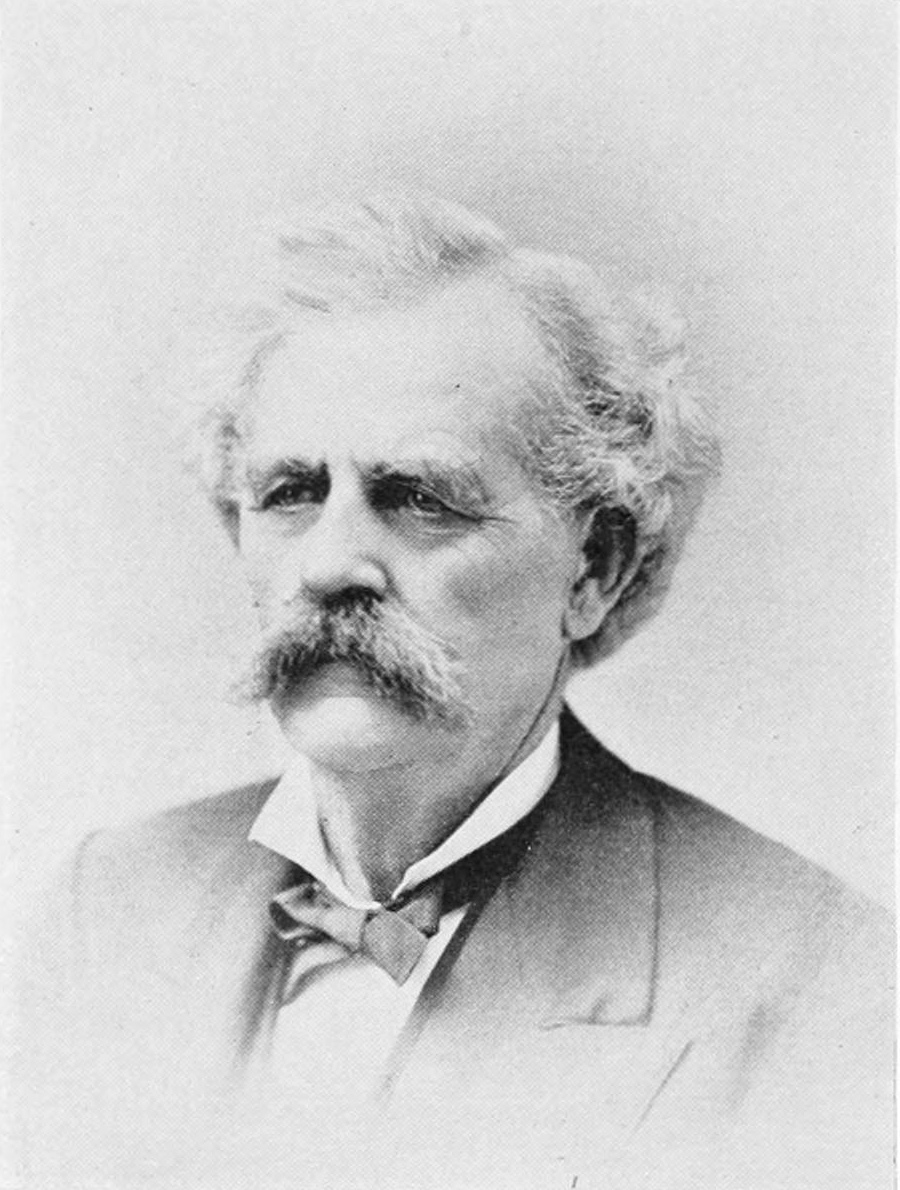

23rd Lieutenant Governor of Massachusetts
- In office 1858–1861
- Governor: Nathaniel Prentice Banks
- Preceded by: Henry Wetherby Benchley
- Succeeded by: John Z. Goodrich

3rd Mayor of Springfield, Massachusetts
- In office 1855–1855
- Preceded by: Philos B. Tyler
- Succeeded by: Ansel Phelps Jr.

Member of the Springfield, Massachusetts Board of Aldermen Ward Two
- In office 1852–1854
- Preceded by: None, new position
- Succeeded by: W. C. Sturtevant

Member of the Springfield, Massachusetts Board of Selectmen

Personal details
- Born: January 8, 1806
- Died: December 9, 1890 (aged 84)
- Political party: Whig, Know Nothing, Republican
- Spouse: Ruby Squier

Eliphalet Trask (January 8, 1806 – December 9, 1890) was an American politician who served as the third mayor of Springfield, Massachusetts, and as the 23rd lieutenant governor of Massachusetts from 1858 to 1861. In 1855 Trask was elected the Mayor of Springfield, Massachusetts, on the Know Nothing party ticket.

Political offices
| Preceded by Henry W. Benchley | Lieutenant Governor of Massachusetts; 1858–1861 | Succeeded by John Z. Goodrich |
| Preceded by Philos B. Tyler | 3rd Mayor of Springfield, Massachusetts; 1855–1855 | Succeeded by Ansel Phelps Jr. |
