= William C. Plunkett =

American politician (1799–1884)

William Caldwell Plunkett
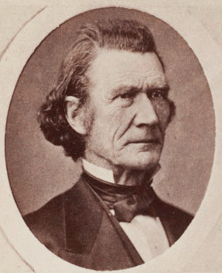

20th Lieutenant Governor of Massachusetts
- In office January 12, 1854 – January 4, 1855
- Governor: Emory Washburn
- Preceded by: Elisha Huntington
- Succeeded by: Simon Brown

Personal details
- Born: October 23, 1799 Lenox, Massachusetts
- Died: January 19, 1884 (aged 84) Adams, Massachusetts
- Party: Whig

William Caldwell Plunkett (October 23, 1799 – January 19, 1884) was an American politician and industrialist who served as the 20th lieutenant governor of Massachusetts from 1854 to 1855. He was a delegate to the Massachusetts Constitutional Convention of 1853 and served in the Massachusetts House of Representatives in 1873. He lived in Adams, Massachusetts, for over 50 years and held many of the local offices.

He was born on October 23, 1799, in Lenox, Berkshire County, Massachusetts. He died on January 19, 1884, in Adams, Berkshire County, Massachusetts. His father was Patrick Plunkett; his mother was Mary Robinson. He first married Achsah Brown; after her death, he married her niece, Louisa Brown, in 1839.

== See also ==
- 1873 Massachusetts legislature

Political offices
Preceded by Elisha Huntington	Lieutenant Governor of Massachusetts; 1854 – 1855	Succeeded by Simon Brown
