= Emory Washburn =

American politician and Harvard Law professor

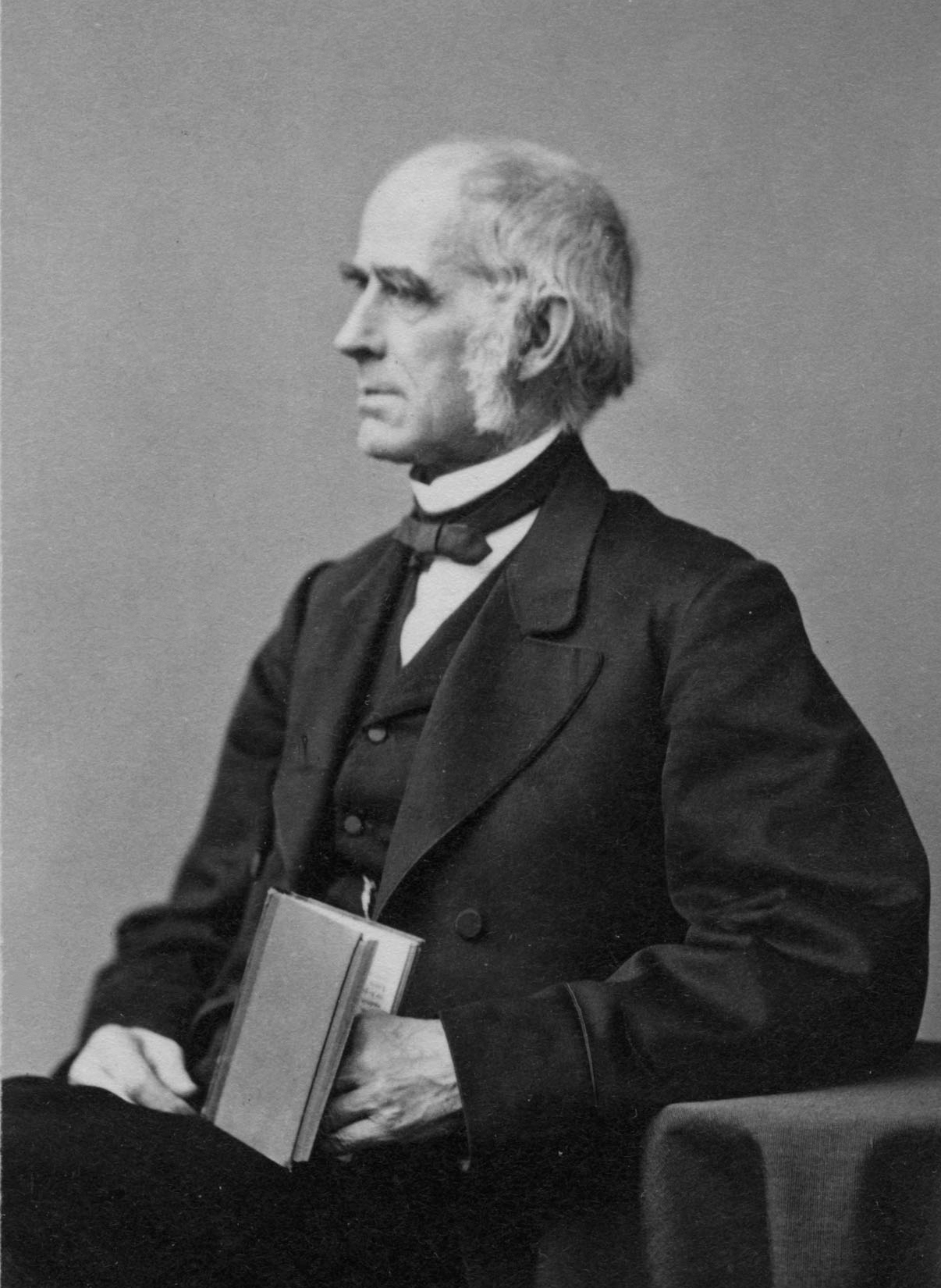

22nd Governor of Massachusetts
- In office January 12, 1854 – January 4, 1855
- Lieutenant: William C. Plunkett
- Preceded by: John H. Clifford
- Succeeded by: Henry J. Gardner

Member of the Massachusetts House of Representatives
- In office 1826; 1838; 1877

Member of the Massachusetts Senate
- In office 1841

Personal details
- Born: February 14, 1800 Leicester, Massachusetts
- Died: March 18, 1877 (aged 77) Cambridge, Massachusetts
- Party: Whig

Emory Washburn (February 14, 1800 – March 18, 1877) was an American lawyer, politician, and historian. He was Governor of Massachusetts for one term (from 1854 to 1855), and served for many years on the faculty of Harvard Law School. His history of the early years of the Massachusetts Supreme Judicial Court is considered a foundational work on the subject.

Born in Leicester, Massachusetts, Washburn attended Dartmouth and Williams before studying law. After establishing what grew to become a successful and distinguished law practice in Worcester, Washburn entered politics as a Whig. After serving several years in the state legislature, he was elected governor in 1853. Despite his support for a reform-minded agenda, he was swept out of office on the Know Nothing tide in 1854.

Washburn joined the faculty of Harvard Law in 1856, where he was a popular and influential figure until his retirement in 1876. His publications, in addition to his history of the SJC, include a history of his hometown of Leicester and numerous treatises on legal subjects.

== Early life ==
Emory Washburn was born on February 14, 1800, in Leicester, Massachusetts, to Joseph and Ruth (Davis) Washburn, both of whom came from families with deep roots in New England. He was the sixth of seven children. His father died when he was seven years old, and the local pastor, Zephaniah Swift Moore, became a major influence in his early years. He first attended Leicester Academy, and then entered Dartmouth College, where Moore taught languages, at the age of thirteen. He accompanied Moore when the latter moved to Williams College in 1815, graduating two years later in a class of seven; he was influential in establishing an alumni association at Williams, serving as its first president.

Our judgements [are] like our watches: none go just alike but each believes his own.

— Washburn notation made while a law student

Washburn then embarked on the study of law, first with Charles Dewey, a Williamstown judge and lawyer, and then at Harvard Law School under Asahel Stearns. Although he did not graduate from Harvard, he was admitted to the bar and opened a practice in Charlemont, Massachusetts. After six months there he returned to his hometown of Leicester, where he practiced until 1828. In that year he moved to Worcester, where he would live and practice for the next thirty years. In 1830 he married Marianne Cornelia Giles, with whom he had three sons and one daughter.

== Political career ==
Washburn was elected to the Massachusetts House of Representatives in 1826, serving two terms; his only notable activity was in committee work preparing a feasibility study for a railroad from Boston to the Connecticut River. He was a regular supporter of the Western Railroad in its efforts to develop the railroad westward from Boston. Washburn asserted that railroads could "... ward off the attack of any invader." He would serve in the state legislature again in 1838 and 1877. From 1830 to 1834 he served on the staff of Governor Levi Lincoln Jr., and in 1841 he was elected to the State Senate, where he served two years. In the second of those years he was chairman of the judiciary committee. In 1844 he was appointed a justice of the Court of Common Pleas, a post he held until 1847. During these years he also established and maintained what was described by one of his peers, George Frisbie Hoar, as one of the largest and most successful law practices in Worcester County, partnering with John Davis among others.

In 1853 Washburn traveled to England to research English constitutional law. While he was away, the Whig Party nominated him as its gubernatorial candidate; he did not learn of his nomination until his ship reached Halifax, Nova Scotia. In the election he defeated Henry W. Bishop (Democrat) and Henry Wilson (Free Soil) with 46% of the vote. Since a majority of votes was at the time required to win, the election was determined in the state senate. Washburn was the last governor elected in this fashion (plurality voting was enacted in 1855); he would also be the last Whig governor. During his one year in office, he successfully promoted and enacted significant pieces of legislation on a broad social welfare agenda, including measures concerning debt relief, assistance to the poor and insane, and financial aid for female medical students.

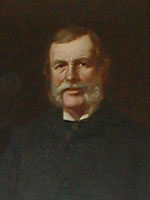
Henry Gardner defeated Washburn in the 1854 governor's race.

One major event that took place during Washburn's tenure was Anthony Burns' arrest and trial under the terms of the Fugitive Slave Law of 1850. The case galvanized anti-slavery activists, who protested outside the courthouse and sought both legal and extra-legal remedies to secure Burns' release. Washburn refused to intercede in the matter, bringing criticism, and Burns remained in custody at the time Washburn left office. Burns was eventually returned to slavery, after which abolitionists purchased his freedom.

The 1854 campaign saw the rise of the secretive Know Nothing movement in Massachusetts politics. Washburn stood for reelection, but the Whig party apparatus was generally unaware of Know Nothing strength and dismissive of its candidates. One commentator described the Know Nothing slate as "spavined ministers, lying tooth-pullers, and buggering priests", and Washburn's opponent, former Whig Henry J. Gardner, as a "rickety vermin" who stood no chance of winning. The outcome of the November election was a landslide: Washburn received only 21% of the vote, and Know Nothing candidates won every major state and Congressional office, as well as most of the seats in the state legislature.

== Law professor ==
The following year he was offered a position as a lecturer at Harvard Law School, which became a full professorship in 1856. The seat had previously been occupied by Judge Edward G. Loring, who Harvard's Overseers refused to retain after he ruled that Burns be returned to slavery. For the next twenty years, Washburn served as one of three dominant figures (along with Theophilus Parsons and Joel Parker) in shaping the law school's practices and curriculum. Legal historian Charles Warren wrote of the three, "Parker was the great lawyer; Parsons the great teacher; and Washburn, the great man." The three men established a collegial and open learning environment at the law school. Washburn produced a significant number of legal treatises and books during his Harvard tenure; his Treatise on the American Law of Real Property formed the basis for Harvard's courses and later textbooks on the subject for the next century. His interests in history and the law were comingled in these years, with a number of his publications covering aspects of both subjects.

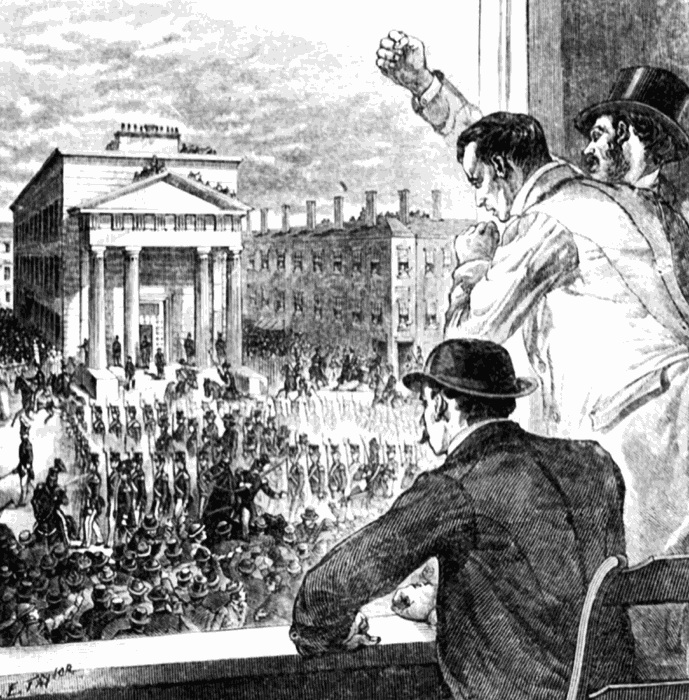
An 1895 depiction of the 1854 protests surrounding the arrest and trial of Anthony Burns

In 1860 Washburn joined in public calls for the repeal of the state's personal liberty laws. These laws, which were designed to make enforcement of the Fugitive Slave Act of 1850 as difficult as possible, were characterized by their opponents as an affront to the interests of slave owners, and as a source of heightened tension between north and south. When the American Civil War broke out in 1861, Washburn led calls for harmony in the law school, which had students from both northern and southern states. He also served, despite his relatively advanced age, in a home guard militia unit, and supported the war effort by writing, giving speeches, and donating money.

Washburn was a popular and dedicated teacher. Students would sometimes attend his lectures just to hear him speak, and he was always willing to help students with matters both academic and personal. He also regularly assisted recent graduates as they made their way into the profession.

In 1870 the Law School hired Christopher Langdell to be its first dean. Langdell began to institute significant changes in the school, which Washburn for the most part went along with. He finally resigned his professorship in 1876, and opened a law practice in Cambridge. He was encouraged to run for United States Congress, but refused. He was instead convinced to stand once again for the Massachusetts House, to which he was elected. He died in office on March 18, 1877, in Cambridge, and was buried at Mount Auburn Cemetery.

== Historian ==
Washburn had a long and abiding interest in local and state history. In 1826 he published a short history of Leicester in a Worcester magazine. This work formed the basis for his Historical Sketches of the Town of Leicester, Massachusetts, published in 1860. He was elected a member of the American Antiquarian Society in 1827, beginning a lifelong association with that organization. He served as the society's secretary for foreign correspondence from 1866 to 1867, and then secretary of domestic correspondence from 1867 to 1877. A large portion of his personal and business papers also resides within its collections. He later became a contributing member to the New England Historical and Genealogical Society and was a member of the Massachusetts Historical Society and the American Academy of Arts and Sciences. In 1840 he published Sketches of the Judicial History of Massachusetts, which provides a basic history of the colonial Massachusetts Superior Court of Judicature (antecedent to the current Massachusetts Supreme Judicial Court) and its justices. Biographer Robert Spector describes it as "the starting point and basis" for legal historical work relating to the court. Washburn considered himself to be more of an antiquarian than a historian: he believed it important to conserve artifacts and historical information, leaving the interpretation of those to others. He wrote of the importance, for example, of the need for the state to preserve its own historical documents (something not given much attention in its early years).

== Publications ==
- Washburn, Emory (1840). Sketches of Massachusetts Judicial History. Boston: Little, Brown. p. 255. OCLC 12348114.
- Washburn, Emory (1855). Brief Sketch of the History of Leicester Academy. Boston: Phillips, Sampson. OCLC 8999551.
- Washburn, Emory (1860). Historical Sketches of the Town of Leicester, Massachusetts. Boston: J. Wilson. OCLC 1727577.
- Washburn, Emory (1860–1862). A Treatise on the American Law of Real Property. Boston: Little, Brown. OCLC 426759176.
- Washburn, Emory (1863). A Treatise on the American Law of Easements and Servitudes. Philadelphia: George W. Childs. OCLC 3004970.
- Washburn, Emory (1876). Lectures on the Study and Practice of the Law (5th ed.). Boston: Little, Brown. ISBN 9780837727295.

== See also ==
- 1877 Massachusetts legislature

== Notes ==
Party political offices
Preceded by John H. Clifford	Whig nominee for Governor of Massachusetts; 1853, 1854	Succeeded by Samuel H. Walley
Political offices
Preceded by John H. Clifford	Governor of Massachusetts; January 12, 1854 – January 4, 1855	Succeeded by Henry J. Gardner
