= Simon Brown (Massachusetts politician) =

American politician (1802–1873)

21st Lieutenant Governor of Massachusetts
- In office 1855–1856
- Governor: Henry Gardner
- Preceded by: William C. Plunkett
- Succeeded by: Henry W. Benchley

Personal details
- Born: November 29, 1802 Newburyport, Massachusetts
- Died: February 27, 1873 (aged 70) Concord, Massachusetts
- Party: Know Nothing
- Occupation: Politician, newspaper editor

Simon Brown (November 29, 1802 – February 27, 1873) was an American politician who served as the 21st lieutenant governor of Massachusetts from 1855 to 1856.

== Life and career ==
Brown was born in Newburyport, Massachusetts, in 1802. He grew up in Chester, New Hampshire, where his family farmed the land. He was largely self-taught. He worked as a printer, publisher, and editor, including of the popular agricultural newspaper New England Farmer from 1851 until his death. Brown owned and operated a farm in Concord, Massachusetts, from 1848 onward and was active in town life. He was a trustee for the State Reform School for Boys in Westborough, Massachusetts.

Brown's wife was a sister of lawyers and politicians Benjamin Brown French and Henry F. French. Brown died in Concord, Massachusetts, of typhoid fever in 1873.

== Political career ==
Brown began his political career as a Democrat, editing a pro-Democratic newspaper in New Hampshire and working for the Clerk of the US House of Representatives and the Library of Congress during the presidency of Martin Van Buren. To attract farmers' votes, the Know Nothing Party selected Brown to run for lieutenant governor of Massachusetts in the November 1854 elections. The Know Nothing ticket swept the elections, and Brown served a one-year term as lieutenant governor from January 1855 to January 1856.

Growing "disgusted" with the Know Nothings, Brown switched to the Republican Party but lost his new party's nomination to Henry W. Benchley, who won the 1855 general election. Brown served as an at-large delegate to the 1856 Republican National Convention in Philadelphia, where he supported the nomination of John C. Frémont. He remained a Republican for the rest of his life.

In 1860, Concord elected him to the Massachusetts General Court, where he was instrumental in passing a bill to lower the dams of the Billerica mills, which had been flooding Concord farms downstream. The legislation was later repealed.

Political offices
Preceded by William C. Plunkett	Lieutenant Governor of Massachusetts; 1855 – 1856	Succeeded by Henry W. Benchley
