= 1853–54 Massachusetts gubernatorial election =

- November 14, 1853 (popular election); January 9, 1854 (legislative vote)
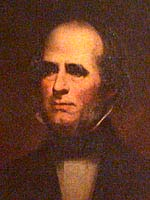

Nominee	Emory Washburn	Bradford L. Wales
Party	Whig	National Democratic
Electoral vote	29	0
Popular vote	59,224	5,477
Percentage	45.94%	4.25%
Nominee	Henry W. Bishop	Henry Wilson
Party	Democratic	Free Soil
Popular vote	35,086	29,020
Percentage	27.22%	22.51%
- Popular election results by county Washburn: 40–50% 50–60% 60–70% Bishop: 40–50% Wilson: 30–40%
Governor before election
John H. Clifford
Whig
Elected Governor
Emory Washburn
Whig

The 1853–54 Massachusetts gubernatorial election consisted of an initial popular held on November 14, 1853, which was followed by a legislative vote that was conducted on January 9, 1854, which elected Whig Party nominee Emory Washburn. The ultimate task of electing the governor had been placed before the Massachusetts General Court because no candidate received the majority of the vote required for a candidate to be elected through the popular election.

Whig Governor John H. Clifford declined to run for a second term in office. Emory Washburn won the race to succeed him. Because no candidate received a majority of the vote, the legislature selected Washburn as the winner.

This was the last time that the legislature elected the governor of Massachusetts, as the popular majority requirement was removed from the Constitution of Massachusetts in 1855. This was also the last election in which the Free Soil Party was a major factor; it was effectively supplanted by the Republican Party in 1854.

== Background ==
=== 1853 constitutional convention ===
The election was dominated by the Massachusetts Constitutional Convention of 1853, which proposed a new constitution for the Commonwealth of Massachusetts. The primary debate at the convention, held from May 4 to August 2, was over the system of representational apportionment used in the House of Representatives.

The debates notably saw the Whigs adopt a strategy of constitutional reform, a reversal from their historical record of conservative retrenchment. The Whig positions, calculated to enhance their urban majority, included equal representation, plurality elections, popular election of executive officers, elimination of the general ticket system in favor of ward representation for municipal elections, and abolition of the poll tax. The Democratic-Free Soil majority stood in support of the disproportionate representation of their agrarian base. Free Soiler Francis W. Bird remarked, "I thought I came here as one of the progressives in company with a majority of this Convention, but I find that we have all turned to the 'right-about-face.' The conservatives are on the engine, and the radicals are on the brake."

== General election ==
=== Candidates ===
- Henry W. Bishop, judge of the Court of Common Pleas (Democratic)
- Bradford L. Wales (National Democratic)
- Emory Washburn, attorney and former state senator (Whig)
- Henry Wilson, former president of the Massachusetts Senate (Free Soil)

=== Campaign ===
Consistent with their new positions following the constitutional convention, the Whig convention at Fitchburg in September resolved in favor of equal representation, the plurality system, expansion of elective offices, abolition of debtors' prison, elimination of the poll tax, and synchronization of state and national elections. Several Whig candidates even embraced the ten-hour day, the focus of their opposition as recently as 1851.

The Democratic convention, seeking to maintain an edge with social reformers, adopted a platform more aggressively favoring labor rights than any ever taken by the party prior to the American Civil War. It included resolutions denouncing corporations for depressing wages, compelling excessive hours from employees, and blacklisting labor organizers.

The convention scrambled political coalitions in the commonwealth; anti-Coalition, anti-prohibition, national Democrats fielded a separate ticket for the second consecutive year and a number of prominent Free Soilers including Charles Francis Adams Sr., John G. Palfrey, and Samuel Hoar opposed the new constitution. Catholic press also denounced the proposed constitution, which included a measure to block public funds from sectarian schools.

On the eve of the election, U.S. Attorney General Caleb Cushing issued a statement enjoining Democrats from further cooperation with anti-slavery forces or suffer the loss of federal patronage.

=== Results ===
1853 Massachusetts gubernatorial election
Party	Candidate	Votes	%	±%
Whig	Emory Washburn	59,224	45.94%	▲0.99
Democratic	Henry W. Bishop	35,086	27.22%	▼0.78
Free Soil	Henry Wilson	29,020	22.51%	▼4.03
National Democratic	Bradford L. Wales	5,477	4.25%	▲3.99
Write-in		114	0.09%	▼0.05
Total votes		128,921	100.00%	

== Legislative vote ==
The Massachusetts House of Representatives certified the popular returns on January 9. Emory Washburn was the first candidate nominated for Governor with 187 votes. On a second ballot, Bradford Wales was nominated with 156 votes. In the Senate, Washburn defeated Wales with 29 out of 30 votes. (Note: The Senate was composed of 30 members, all of whom were in attendance. However, the source does not make clear whether the remaining Senator cast his vote for Wales or abstained.)

== See also ==
- 1853 Massachusetts legislature
