= Henry Wetherby Benchley =

American politician

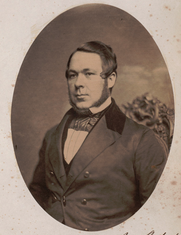

22nd Lieutenant Governor of Massachusetts
- In office 1856–1858
- Governor: Henry Gardner
- Preceded by: Simon Brown
- Succeeded by: Eliphalet Trask

Personal details
- Born: February 20, 1822 Valley Forge, Pennsylvania
- Died: February 24, 1867 (aged 45) Houston, Texas
- Party: Know Nothing; Republican
- Spouse: Julia Ann Goddard
- Relations: Robert Benchley (grandson) Nathaniel Benchley (great-grandson) Peter Benchley (great-great-grandson)

Henry Wetherby Benchley (February 20, 1822 – February 24, 1867) was an American politician who served in the Massachusetts Senate and as the 22nd lieutenant governor of Massachusetts. During the 1850s, he was one of the founders of the Republican Party.

== Biography ==
Benchley's immigrant ancestor was William Benchley, who had settled in Rhode Island from Wales. By the 1840s, Benchley's family had relocated from Smithfield, Rhode Island to Worcester, Massachusetts. He married Julia Ann Goddard and they had two sons, Charles and Julian. Benchley became active with regional politics, helping found the Republican Party during the 1850s. He also served in the Massachusetts Senate from Worcester, and was elected as Lieutenant Governor of Massachusetts during the mid-1850s.

After Julia's death in 1854, Benchley arranged for relatives to care for his sons and went to Texas to oppose slavery. He was arrested and jailed in Houston for helping manage an Underground Railroad station. This was after the Fugitive Slave Law of 1850 was passed, which increased penalties for anti-slavery activism. He died in Houston in 1867 after the Civil War ended.

== Legacy ==
- His grandson, Robert Benchley, became a famed humorist based in New York City. His great-grandson, Nathaniel Benchley, and great-great-grandson, Peter Benchley, also became noted authors.

== See also ==
- 76th Massachusetts General Court (1855)

Political offices
Preceded by Simon Brown	Lieutenant Governor of Massachusetts; 1856 – 1858	Succeeded by Eliphalet Trask
Preceded by Charles Edward Cook	President of the Massachusetts Senate; 1855	Succeeded by Elihu C. Baker
