= 1852–53 Massachusetts gubernatorial election =

- November 8, 1852 (popular); January 12, 1853 (legislative)
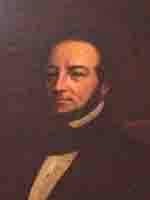

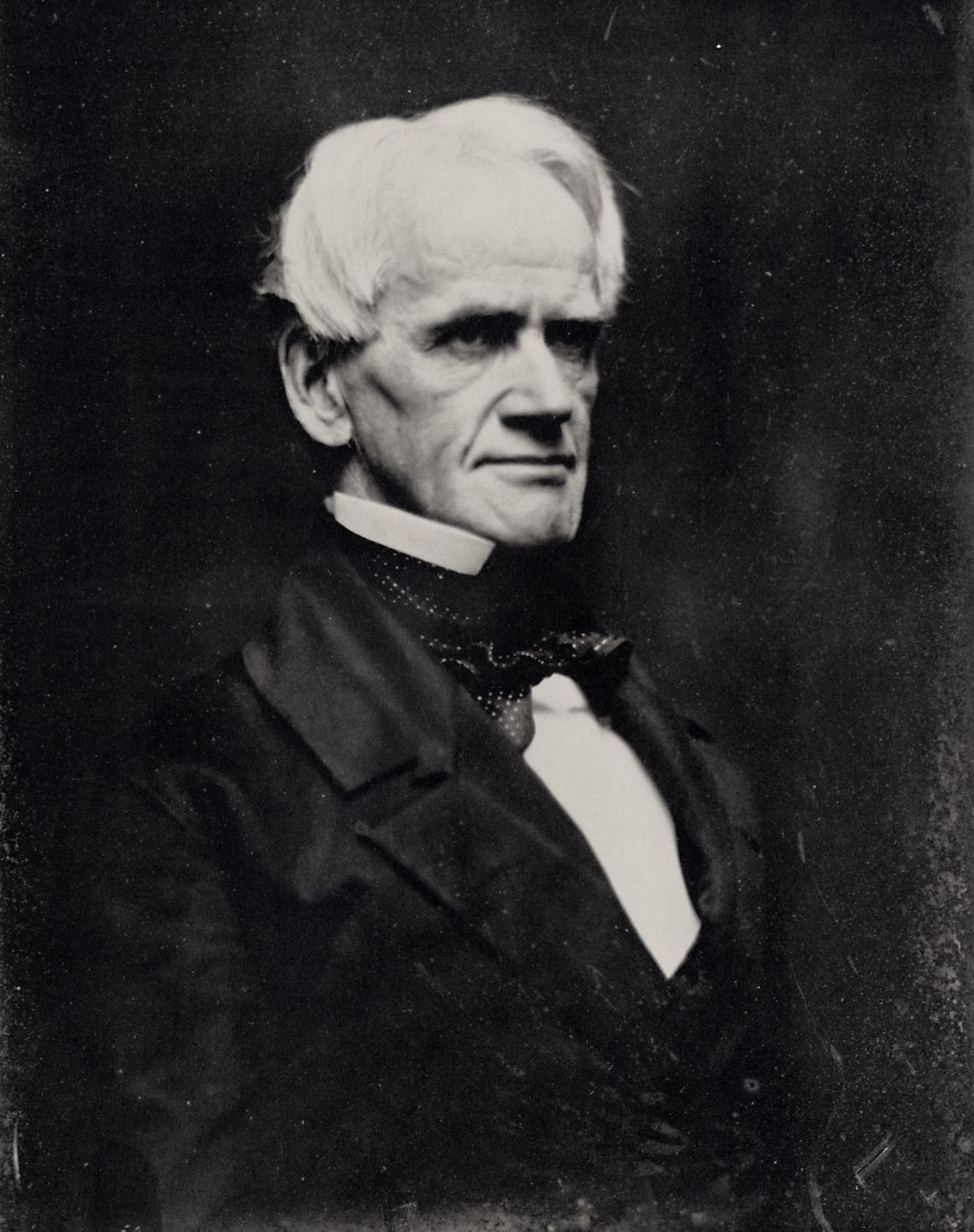
| Nominee | John H. Clifford | Henry W. Bishop | Horace Mann |
| Party | Whig | Democratic | Free Soil |
| Electoral vote | 29 | 4 | Did not qualify |
| Popular vote | 62,233 | 37,763 | 36,740 |
| Percentage | 44.95% | 28.00% | 26.54% |
- Popular election results by county Clifford: 40–50% 50–60% 60–70% Bishop: 40–50% Mann: 30–40%
Governor before election
George S. Boutwell
Democratic
Elected Governor
John H. Clifford
Whig

The 1852–53 Massachusetts gubernatorial election consisted of an initial popular vote held on November 8, 1852, followed by a legislative vote conducted on January 12, 1853, which elected Whig Party nominee John H. Clifford. The ultimate task of electing the governor had been placed before the Massachusetts General Court because no candidate received the majority of the vote required for a candidate to be elected through the popular election.

Incumbent Democratic governor George S. Boutwell declined to run for a third term in office.

== Democratic nominations ==
=== Candidates ===
- Henry W. Bishop, judge of the Court of Common Pleas
- David Henshaw, former U.S. secretary of the Navy

=== Convention and split ===
With the imminent presidential election creating an increased emphasis on national politics, the Democratic Party became divided over the issue of slavery and its expansion in the western territories. Coalitionists favored a moderate approach which allowed the party to reconcile with its ally in the past three elections, the Free Soil Party. Without the Free Soilers, the party likely had no chance at winning. The Coalitionists held the majority of the party and nominated Henry W. Bishop of Lenox for governor in September. A breakaway faction calling themselves "National Democrats" rejected the Bishop ticket. The National Democrats nominated David Henshaw, a long-time ally of John C. Calhoun who had served as secretary of the Navy in the John Tyler administration.

== General election ==
=== Candidates ===
- Henry W. Bishop, judge of the Court of Common Pleas (Democratic)
- John H. Clifford, attorney general of Massachusetts (Whig)
- David Henshaw, former U.S. secretary of the Navy (National Democratic)
- Horace Mann, U.S. representative from Newton (Free Soil)
- Edward A. Vose (Independent)

=== Results ===
1852 Massachusetts gubernatorial election
| Party | Candidate | Votes | % | ±% |
|---|---|---|---|---|
| Whig | John H. Clifford | 62,233 | 44.95 | ▼1.98 |
| Democratic | Henry W. Bishop | 38,763 | 28.00 | ▼3.93 |
| Free Soil | Horace Mann | 36,740 | 26.54 | ▲5.69 |
| National Democratic | David Henshaw | 357 | 0.26 | N/A |
| Write-in | | 195 | 0.14 | ▼0.05 |
| Independent | Edward A. Vose | 148 | 0.11 | N/A |
| Total votes | | 138,436 | 100.00 | |

=== Legislative vote ===
As a result of the failure for a candidate to secure the needed majority to be elected through the popular vote, the election of the governor was placed before the two chambers of the state legislature: the Massachusetts General Court. The process for the legislature to elect a governor saw the Massachusetts House of Representatives first hold votes to select two candidates from which the Massachusetts State Senate would then select a winner. The House balloting to select candidates required a candidate to receive a simple majority in a ballot round in order for that candidate to be successfully selected as one of the two candidates for consideration by the Senate. The General Court held its votes to elect the governor on January 12, 1853.

Massachusetts House of Representatives vote to select the first candidate to be placed before the Massachusetts State Senate
| Party | Candidate | Votes | % |
|---|---|---|---|
| Whig | John H. Clifford | 148 | 52.30 |
| Democratic | Henry W. Bishop | 84 | 29.68 |
| Free Soil | Horace Mann | 51 | 18.02 |
| Independent | Edward A. Vose | 0 | 0.00 |
| Total votes | | 283 | 100.00 |

Massachusetts House of Representatives vote to select the second candidate to be placed before the Massachusetts State Senate
| Party | Candidate | Votes | % |
|---|---|---|---|
| Democratic | Henry W. Bishop | 189 | 75.90 |
| Free Soil | Horace Mann | 59 | 23.69 |
| Independent | Edward A. Vose | 1 | 0.40 |
| Total votes | | 249 | 100.00 |
| Spoilt vote | J.S. Wiggin (not an eligible candidate) | 1 | N/A |

Massachusetts State Senate Senate vote for governor
| Party | Candidate | Votes | % |
|---|---|---|---|
| Whig | John H. Clifford | 29 | 87.88 |
| Democratic | Henry W. Bishop | 4 | 12.12 |
| Total votes | | 33 | 100.00 |

== See also ==
- 1852 Massachusetts legislature
