= Lieutenant Governor of Massachusetts =

American position

Lieutenant Governor of the Commonwealth of Massachusetts
- Seal of Massachusetts

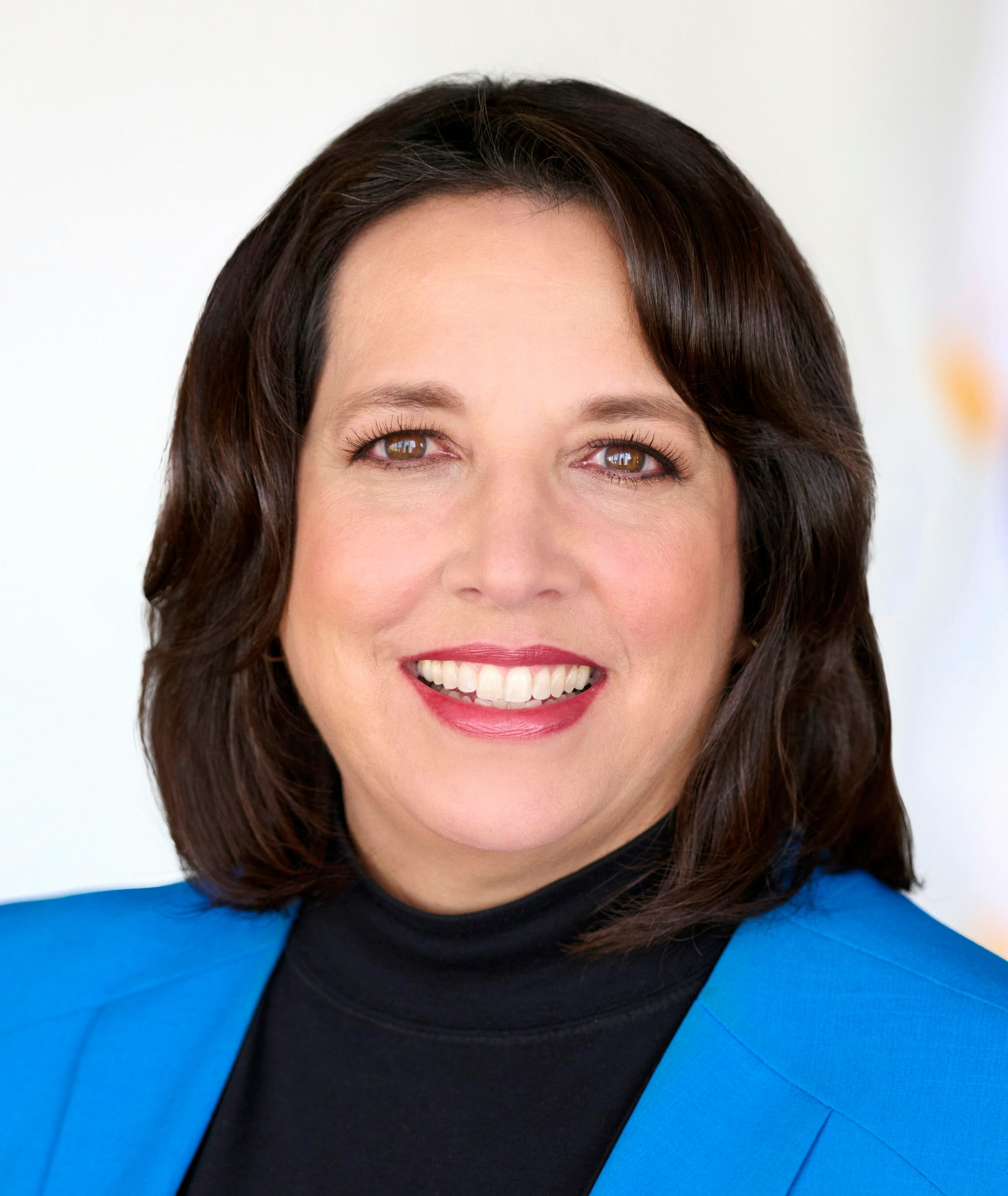
- Incumbent; Kim Driscoll since January 5, 2023
- Government of Massachusetts
- Style: His Honor/Her Honor
- Status: Deputy officer
- Member of: Governor's Council; Cabinet
- Reports to: Governor of Massachusetts
- Residence: None official
- Seat: State House, Boston, Massachusetts
- Nominator: Nominating petition, Political parties
- Appointer: Popular vote
- Term length: Four years, no limit
- Constituting instrument: Constitution of Massachusetts
- Formation: Original post: April 30, 1629; Current form: October 25, 1780
- Succession: First
- Salary: $165,000 (2018)
- Website: https://www.mass.gov/person/kim-driscoll-lieutenant-governor

The lieutenant governor of Massachusetts is the first in the line to discharge the powers and duties of the office of governor following the incapacitation of the governor of Massachusetts. The constitutional honorific title for the office is His, or Her, Honor.

The Massachusetts Constitution provides that when a governor dies, resigns, or is removed from office, the office of governor remains vacant for the rest of the four-year term. The lieutenant governor discharges powers and duties as acting governor and does not assume the office of governor. The first time this came into use was five years after the constitution's adoption in 1785, when Governor John Hancock resigned his post five months before the election and inauguration of his successor, James Bowdoin, leaving Lieutenant Governor Thomas Cushing as acting governor. Most recently, Jane Swift became acting governor when Paul Cellucci resigned in 2001 to become the U.S. Ambassador to Canada.

When the governor is outside the borders of Massachusetts, the lieutenant governor exercises the power of the governor. Historically a one-year term, the office of lieutenant governor now carries a four-year term, the same as that of the governor. The lieutenant governor is not elected independently, but on a ticket with the governor. The 1780 constitution required a candidate for either office to have lived in Massachusetts for at least seven years immediately preceding election, own at least £1,000 worth of real property and to "declare himself to be of the Christian religion". However, only the residency requirement remains in effect, and both men and women have served in the office. Amendment Article LXIV (1918) changed the election from every year to every two years, and Amendment Article LXXXII (1966) changed it again to every four years. The office is currently held by Kim Driscoll, who was inaugurated in January 2023.

== Qualifications ==
Any person seeking to become Lieutenant Governor of Massachusetts must meet the following requirements:

- Be at least eighteen years of age
- Be a registered voter in Massachusetts
- Be a Massachusetts resident for at least seven years when elected
- Receive 10,000 signatures from registered voters on nomination papers

== History ==
The role of the lieutenant governor has its roots in the role of the deputy governor of the Province of Massachusetts Bay. Originally the deputy, along with the governor, and the Council of Assistants were elected by freemen of the colony. They served as executives in the governance of the colony but also as executive officers of the Company of Massachusetts Bay. Originally these royal officers were to remain in London, as was the case with other royal colonial companies. However, John Humphrey and John Winthrop, the first deputy and governor respectively, traveled to the colony instead. In the colonial era the governor and deputy served as chief magistrates along with the Council, and the governor served as general of the militia and the deputy as Colonel.

In the early days of the colony the deputy governor was elected to a one year term along with the governor. With the revocation of the charter of 1629 and the establishment of the Dominion of New England, all this was changed. Now the Royal Officers were to be appointed by the King and Privy Council. They were to follow royal directive and serve the interests of the Crown. The Royal Government in Great Britain was frustrated with their lack of control of the New England colonies and sought to reassert their authority.

Now styled "Lieutenant Governor", the new royal appointees came into conflict with the colonists and General Court who wished to regain authority of provincial affairs. The last Lieutenant Governor was Thomas Oliver who served with Gen. Thomas Gage.

== Constitutional role ==
Part the Second, Chapter II, Section II, Article I of the Massachusetts Constitution reads,

There shall be annually elected a lieutenant governor of the commonwealth of Massachusetts, whose title shall be, His Honor and who shall be qualified, in point of religion, property, and residence in the commonwealth, in the same manner with the governor: and the day and manner of his or her election, and the qualifications of the electors, shall be the same as are required in the election of a governor.

The lieutenant governor also serves ex officio as a member of the Massachusetts Governor's Council.

== Other functions ==
Massachusetts law provides for the lieutenant governor to serve as the chairman of the award selection committee for the Madeline Amy Sweeney Award for Civilian Bravery.

== Election ==
The lieutenant governor is typically elected on a joint ticket with the governor, ensuring that they have the same political party affiliation. The primary however is separate from the governor. When the state constitution was first enacted in 1780, elections for the two offices were independent, and were held annually. Constitutional amendments enacted in 1918 extended the terms of both offices to two years, with elections in even-numbered years. In 1964 the constitution was amended again to extend the terms to four years, and in 1966 to allow for the grouping of governor and lieutenant governor on the ballot by political party. Elections are held in even-numbered years that are not presidential election years.

== List of lieutenant governors ==
Lieutenant governors who acted as governor during a portion of their terms (due to vacancy by death or resignation in the governor's seat) are marked by asterisks (*).

No.	Lieutenant Governor	Term in office	Political party	Governor(s)
Parties Democratic (15) Democratic-Republican (7) Federalist (4) Independent (2) Know Nothing (1) Republican (39) Whig (5)
1	Thomas Cushing*	1780–1788	Independent	John Hancock (I); James Bowdoin (I)
2	Benjamin Lincoln	1788–1789	Federalist	John Hancock (I)
3	Samuel Adams	1789–1794	Democratic-Republican	John Hancock (I)
4	Moses Gill*	1794–1800	Independent	Samuel Adams (DR); Increase Sumner (F)
Office vacant from May 20, 1800 – [?], 1801				Governor's Council; Caleb Strong (F)
5	Samuel Phillips Jr.	1801–1802	Federalist	Caleb Strong (F)
6	Edward Robbins	1802–1806	Democratic-Republican	Caleb Strong (F)
Office vacant from [?], 1806 – May 29, 1807				Caleb Strong (F)
7	Levi Lincoln Sr.*	1807–1809	Democratic-Republican	James Sullivan (DR)
8	David Cobb	1809–1810	Federalist	Christopher Gore (F)
9	William Gray	1810–1812	Democratic-Republican	Elbridge Gerry (DR)
10	William Phillips Jr.	1812–1823	Federalist	Caleb Strong (F); John Brooks (F)
11	Levi Lincoln Jr.	1823–1824	Democratic-Republican	William Eustis (DR)
12	Marcus Morton*	1824–1825	Democratic-Republican	William Eustis (DR)
13	Thomas L. Winthrop	1825–1833	Democratic-Republican	Levi Lincoln Jr. (NR, W)
14	Samuel T. Armstrong*	1833–1835	Whig	John Davis (W)
15	George Hull	1836–1843	Whig	Edward Everett (W); Marcus Morton (D); John Davis (W)
16	Henry H. Childs	1843–1844	Democratic	Marcus Morton (D)
17	John Reed Jr.	1844–1851	Whig	George N. Briggs (W)
18	Henry W. Cushman	1851–1853	Democratic	George S. Boutwell (D)
19	Elisha Huntington	1853–1854	Whig	John H. Clifford (W)
20	William C. Plunkett	1854–1855	Whig	Emory Washburn (W)
21	Simon Brown	1855–1856	Know Nothing	Henry Gardner (KN)
22	Henry W. Benchley	1856–1858	Republican	Henry Gardner (KN)
23	Eliphalet Trask	1858–1861	Republican	Nathaniel Prentice Banks (R)
24	John Z. Goodrich	1861	Republican	John Albion Andrew (R)
25	John Nesmith	1862	Republican	John Albion Andrew (R)
26	Joel Hayden	1863–1866	Republican	John Albion Andrew (R)
27	William Claflin	1866–1869	Republican	Alexander H. Bullock (R)
28	Joseph Tucker	1869–1873	Republican	William Claflin (R); William B. Washburn (R)
29	Thomas Talbot*	1873–1875	Republican	William B. Washburn (R)
30	Horatio G. Knight	1875–1879	Republican	William Gaston (D); Alexander H. Rice (R)
31	John D. Long	1879–1880	Republican	Thomas Talbot (R)
32	Byron Weston	1880–1883	Republican	John Davis Long (R)
33	Oliver Ames	1883–1887	Republican	Benjamin F. Butler (D, Greenback); George D. Robinson (R)
34	John Q. A. Brackett	1887–1890	Republican	Oliver Ames (R)
35	William H. Haile	1890–1893	Republican	John Q. A. Brackett (R); William Russell (D)
36	Roger Wolcott*	1893–1896	Republican	William Russell (D); Frederic T. Greenhalge (R)
37	Winthrop M. Crane	1897–1900	Republican	Roger Wolcott (R)
38	John L. Bates	1900–1903	Republican	Winthrop Murray Crane (R)
39	Curtis Guild Jr.	1903–1906	Republican	John L. Bates (R); William Lewis Douglas (D)
40	Eben S. Draper	1906–1909	Republican	Curtis Guild Jr. (R)
41	Louis A. Frothingham	1909–1912	Republican	Eben S. Draper (R); Eugene Noble Foss (D)
42	Robert Luce	1912–1913	Republican	Eugene Noble Foss (D)
43	David I. Walsh	1913–1914	Democratic	Eugene Noble Foss (D)
44	Edward P. Barry	1914–1915	Democratic	David I. Walsh (D)
45	Grafton D. Cushing	1915–1916	Republican	David I. Walsh (D)
46	Calvin Coolidge	1916–1919	Republican	Samuel W. McCall (R)
47	Channing H. Cox	1919–1921	Republican	Calvin Coolidge (R)
48	Alvan T. Fuller	1921–1925	Republican	Channing H. Cox (R)
49	Frank G. Allen	1925–1929	Republican	Alvan T. Fuller (R)
50	William S. Youngman	1929–1933	Republican	Frank G. Allen (R)
51	Gaspar G. Bacon	1933–1935	Republican	Joseph B. Ely (D)
52	Joseph L. Hurley	1935–1937	Democratic	James Michael Curley (D)
53	Francis E. Kelly	1937–1939	Democratic	Charles F. Hurley (D)
54	Horace T. Cahill	1939–1945	Republican	Leverett Saltonstall (R)
55	Robert F. Bradford	1945–1947	Republican	Maurice J. Tobin (D)
56	Arthur W. Coolidge	1947–1949	Republican	Robert F. Bradford (R)
57	Charles F. Sullivan	1949–1953	Democratic	Paul A. Dever (D)
58	Sumner G. Whittier	1953–1957	Republican	Christian Herter (R)
59	Robert F. Murphy	1957–1960	Democratic	Foster Furcolo (D)
Office vacant from October 6, 1960 – January 5, 1961				Foster Furcolo (D)
60	Edward F. McLaughlin Jr.	1961–1963	Democratic	John A. Volpe (R)
61	Francis Bellotti	1963–1965	Democratic	Endicott Peabody (D)
62	Elliot Richardson	1965–1967	Republican	John A. Volpe (R)
63	Francis Sargent*	1967–1971	Republican	John A. Volpe (R)
64	Donald Dwight	1971–1975	Republican	Francis W. Sargent (R)
65	Thomas P. O'Neill III	1975–1983	Democratic	Michael Dukakis (D); Edward J. King (D)
66	John Kerry	1983–1985	Democratic	Michael Dukakis (D)
Office vacant from January 2, 1985 – January 8, 1987				Michael Dukakis (D)
67	Evelyn Murphy	1987–1991	Democratic	Michael Dukakis (D)
68	Paul Cellucci*	1991–1999	Republican	William Weld (R)
69	Jane Swift*	1999–2003	Republican	Paul Cellucci (R)
70	Kerry Healey	2003–2007	Republican	Mitt Romney (R)
71	Tim Murray	2007–2013	Democratic	Deval Patrick (D)
Office vacant from June 2, 2013 – January 8, 2015				Deval Patrick (D)
72	Karyn Polito	2015–2023	Republican	Charlie Baker (R)
73	Kim Driscoll	2023–present	Democratic	Maura Healey (D)

== See also ==
- List of governors of Massachusetts
- Government of Massachusetts
- Massachusetts gubernatorial election, 2022
- Massachusetts gubernatorial election, 2018
