= 1857 Massachusetts gubernatorial election =

- November 3, 1857
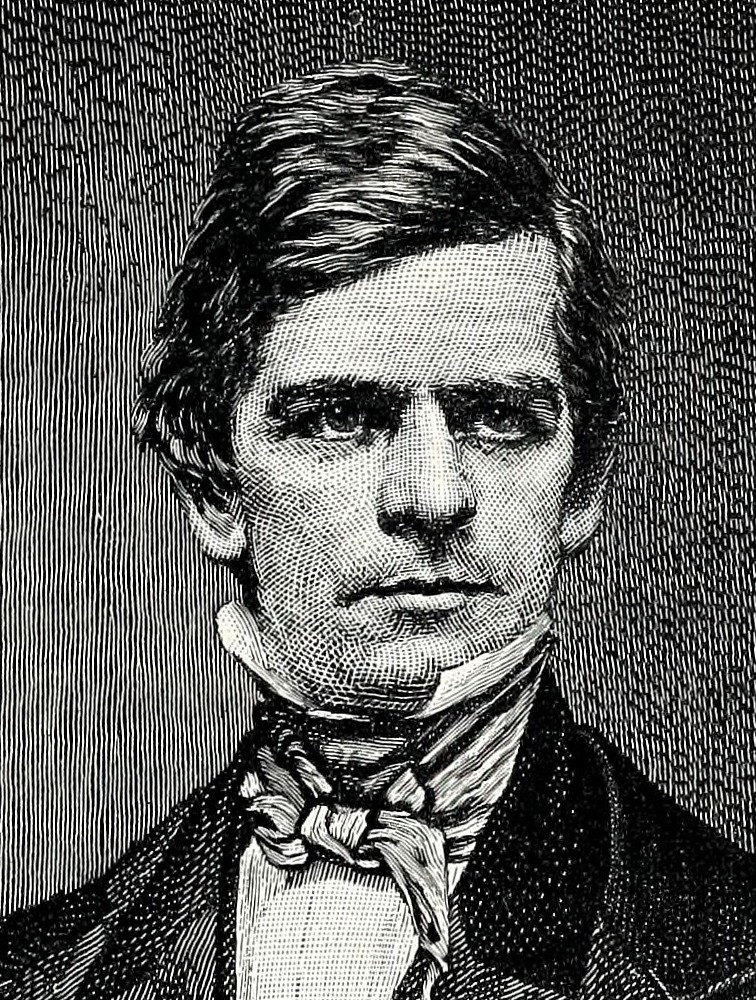

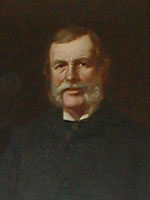

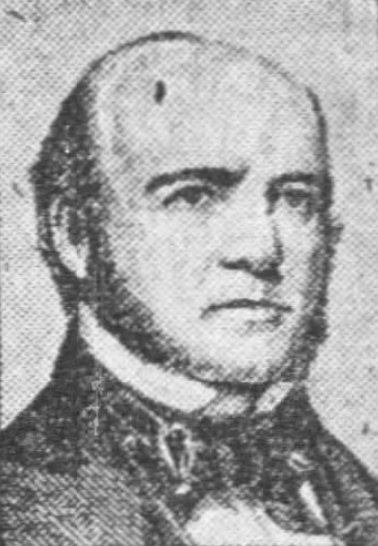
Nominee	Nathaniel Banks	Henry J. Gardner	Erasmus Beach
Party	Republican	Know Nothing	Democratic
Popular vote	60,797	37,596	31,760
Percentage	46.58%	28.81%	24.33%
- County results Banks: 40–50% 50–60% 60–70% Gardner: 30–40%
Governor before election
Henry J. Gardner
Know Nothing
Elected Governor
Nathaniel Prentiss Banks
Republican

The 1857 Massachusetts gubernatorial election was held on November 3. Incumbent Know-Nothing governor Henry J. Gardner ran for a fourth term in office, but lost the support of the Republican Party, which nominated Speaker of the United States House of Representatives Nathaniel P. Banks. Banks prevailed over Gardner to become the first Republican governor of Massachusetts.

Gardner's loss also began an informal tradition of no governor serving more than three consecutive one-year terms, which persisted until 1920, when the governor's term was extended to two years. The only exception to this tradition was made for Governor John Albion Andrew, who held office during the Civil War.

== General election ==
=== Candidates ===
- Nathaniel Prentiss Banks, speaker of the U.S. House of Representatives (Republican)
- Erasmus Beach, nominee for governor in 1855 and 1856 (Democratic)
- Henry J. Gardner, incumbent governor (American)
- Caleb Swan ("Straight Republican")

=== Results ===
1857 Massachusetts gubernatorial election
Party	Candidate	Votes	%	±%
Republican	Nathaniel Prentiss Banks	60,797	46.58%	N/A
Know Nothing	Henry J. Gardner (incumbent)	37,596	28.81%	▼30.11
Democratic	Erasmus D. Beach	31,760	24.33%	▼1.21
Independent Republican	Caleb Swan	213	0.16%	▼3.43
Total votes		130,366	100.00%	
Republican gain from Know Nothing		Swing		

== See also ==
- 1857 Massachusetts legislature
