= Rural Cemetery and Friends Cemetery =

Historic cemeteries in Massachusetts, United States

- U.S. National Register of Historic Places
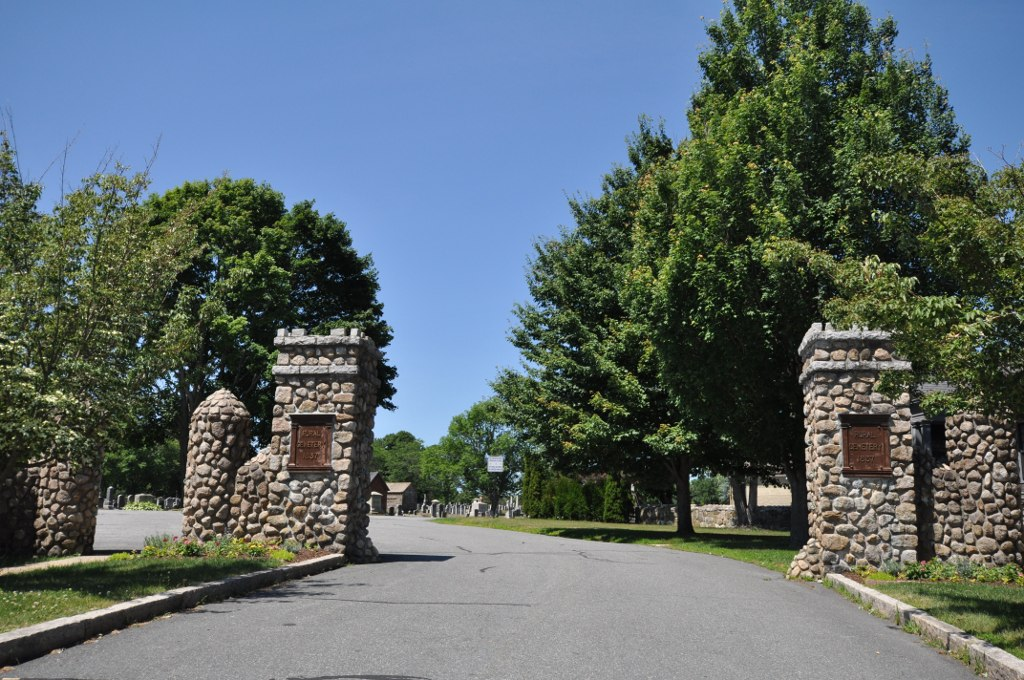
- The cemetery gate

- Location within Massachusetts Location within the United States
- Location: 149 Dartmouth Street, New Bedford, Massachusetts
- Coordinates: 41.6229°N 70.9354°W
- Area: 91.57 acres (37.06 ha)
- Built: 1837
- NRHP reference No.: 14000177
- Added to NRHP: April 28, 2014

The Rural Cemetery and Friends Cemetery are a pair of connected cemeteries at 149 Dartmouth Street in New Bedford, Massachusetts United States. They occupy an irregular parcel of land more than 90 acres (36 ha) in size on the west side of the city. Established in 1837, the Rural Cemetery was the fifth rural cemetery in the nation, after Mount Auburn Cemetery (Cambridge, Massachusetts), Mount Hope Cemetery (Bangor, Maine), Mount Pleasant Cemetery (Taunton, Massachusetts), and Laurel Hill Cemetery (Philadelphia, Pennsylvania). In its early days it was criticized as lacking some of the natural beauty afforded by rolling terrain; the early sections were laid out in rectilinear manner on relatively flat terrain. The cemetery was a popular burial site, including notably the landscape artist Albert Bierstadt and Governor of Massachusetts John H. Clifford.

In contrast to the more decorative nature of the Rural Cemetery, the Friends Cemetery is much plainer. It consists of a roughly 2-acre (0.81 ha) parcel on one side of the Rural Cemetery, which was sold to the Dartmouth Friends in 1849, but is administered by the city. This section has less ornate markers, generally laid out in rectilinear fashion. It includes burials that were relocated from a Friends cemetery (dating to 1793) that had been located on the New Bedford waterfront.

The cemeteries were listed on the National Register of Historic Places in 2014.

== Notable burials ==
- Charles S. Ashley (1858–1941) – Mayor of New Bedford
- Charles James Barclay (1843–1909) – United States Navy officer
- Albert Bierstadt (1830–1902) – German-American painter, see List of works by Albert Bierstadt
- Jonathan Bourne (1811–1889) – New Bedford alderman and namesake of the town of Bourne, Massachusetts
- Martha B. Briggs (1838–1889) – educator
- John H. Clifford (1809–1876) – Massachusetts governor and attorney general
- Jethro Coffin (1663–1727) – Jethro Coffin's House is the oldest residence on Nantucket still on its original site
- Thomas Washburn Cook (1837–1920) – Massachusetts State Senator in 1889 and 1890
- William W. Crapo (1830–1926) – member of the United States House of Representatives from Massachusetts
- Alexander Du Bois (1803–1887) – grandfather of W. E. B. Du Bois
- Robert Swain Gifford (1840–1905) – landscape painter
- Captain Amos Haskins (1816–1861) – member of the Wampanoag Tribe of Gay Head, ship captain, whaler, and mariner
- Hosea M. Knowlton (1847–1902) – lawyer, District Attorney, and Attorney General of Massachusetts
- Charles S. Randall (1824–1904) – member of the United States House of Representatives from Massachusetts
- Albert Pinkham Ryder (1847–1917) – tonalist painter
- Howland H. Sargeant (1911–1984) – United States Assistant Secretary of State for Public Affairs and the president of Radio Liberty
- Edwin P. Seaver (1838–1917) – educator who served as superintendent of Boston Public Schools from 1880 to 1904
- William Allen Wall (1801–1885) – painter

== See also ==
- National Register of Historic Places listings in New Bedford, Massachusetts
