= John H. Clifford =

Massachusetts governor and attorney general (1809–1876)

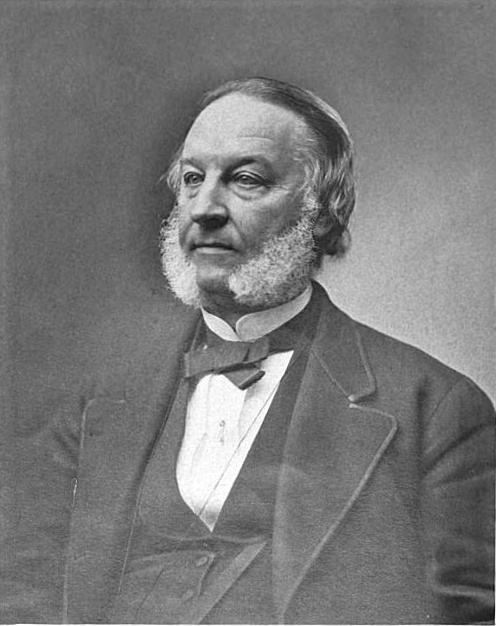

21st Governor of Massachusetts
- In office January 14, 1853 – January 12, 1854
- Lieutenant: Elisha Huntington
- Preceded by: George S. Boutwell
- Succeeded by: Emory Washburn

9th & 11th Massachusetts Attorney General
- In office 1849–1853
- Governor: George N. Briggs; George S. Boutwell
- Preceded by: Office revived (abolished since 1843)
- Succeeded by: Rufus Choate
- In office 1854–1858
- Governor: Emory Washburn; Henry Gardner; Nathaniel Prentice Banks
- Preceded by: Rufus Choate
- Succeeded by: Stephen Henry Phillips

Member of the Massachusetts House of Representatives
- In office 1835–1839

Personal details
- Born: John Henry Clifford; January 16, 1809 Providence, Rhode Island, U.S.
- Died: January 2, 1876 (aged 66) New Bedford, Massachusetts, U.S.
- Party: Whig; Republican
- Spouse: Sarah Parker Allen
- Profession: Lawyer, politician

John Henry Clifford (January 16, 1809 – January 2, 1876) was an American lawyer and politician from New Bedford, Massachusetts. He served as the state's attorney general for much of the 1850s, retaining the office during administrations dominated by three different political parties. A Whig, he was elected the state's 21st governor, serving a single term from 1853 to 1854. He was the first governor of Massachusetts not born in the state.

As attorney general Clifford gained fame by leading the prosecution in one of the most sensational trials of the 19th century, the Parkman–Webster murder case. The case, where both victim and assailant were from the upper crust of Boston society, featured the first use of forensic dentistry to secure a conviction. During the American Civil War Clifford supported the Union cause, and was involved in unsuccessful maneuvers to prosecute Confederate president Jefferson Davis after the war. In his later years he served as president of the Boston and Providence Railroad.

== Early years ==
John Clifford was born to Benjamin and Achsah (Wade) Clifford in Providence, Rhode Island, on January 16, 1809. He was the sixth of thirteen children. He graduated from Brown University in 1827, read law with Timothy Coffin in New Bedford, Massachusetts, and Theron Metcalf in Dedham, Massachusetts, and then opened a law practice in New Bedford. He maintained that practice, sometimes with partners, for the rest of his life. Clifford married Sarah Parker Allen on January 16, 1832. The couple had five children.

In 1835, Clifford was elected to the Massachusetts legislature, where he sat on a committee that revised the state's statutes. In 1836 he served as an aide to Governor Edward Everett, a position he held until Everett lost the 1839 election. Everett rewarded Clifford for his service by naming him district attorney for the southern district of the state in 1839, a post he held for ten years. He was concurrently elected state senator representing Bristol County in 1845. In 1849 he was appointed state attorney general by Governor George N. Briggs. He was the only major appointed Whig official retained by Democrat George S. Boutwell after he took office in 1851. Boutwell explained in his memoirs that Clifford "was a good officer and an upright man, but he lacked the quality which enables a man to reach conclusions. This peculiarity made him useful to me. He would investigate a subject, give me the authorities and precedents, and leave the conclusions to me. Next, there was no one in the administration party whom I wished to appoint. Mr. [Benjamin] Hallett was the candidate most generally supported. He was full of prejudices and he was not well instructed as a lawyer. In these respects Clifford was his opposite."

== Attorney general and governor ==
The first major case that Clifford prosecuted was for the murder of Boston Brahmin George Parkman, and it was one of the most sensational of the 19th century. Parkman had disappeared in November 1849 and Harvard professor John White Webster had been arrested for his murder. The gruesome method of the body's disposal (which was not complete), the fact that it was a capital crime, and the high status of both victim and accused ensured a great deal of public interest in the case, and the courtroom was packed. Clifford's case was complicated by the fact that there was no actual body. Assisted by George Bemis, who had been retained by the Parkman family, he resorted instead to dental forensics and strong circumstantial evidence to build the case against Webster. The jury returned a guilty verdict after two and one half hours of deliberation. There was much controversy afterward concerning the jury instructions given by Chief Justice Lemuel Shaw, but Webster was eventually hanged after confessing the crime. The case has continued to interest legal scholars, in part over allegations that the defense (which included one lawyer lacking significant criminal trial experience) failed to aggressively dispute the evidence presented, and also did not introduce potentially exculpatory evidence.

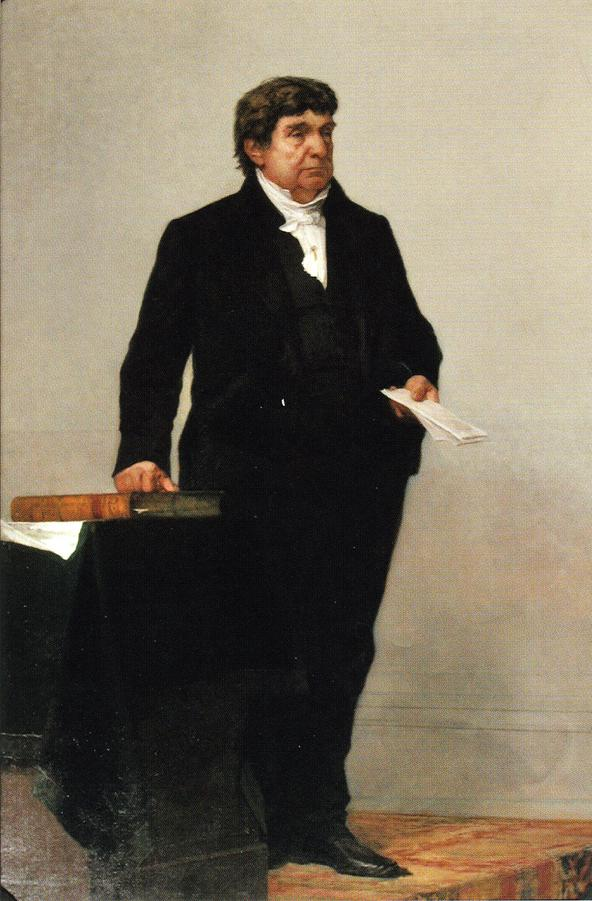
Massachusetts Supreme Judicial Court Chief Justice Lemuel Shaw (portrait by William Morris Hunt) presided over the Parkman–Webster murder case and was a friend of Clifford's

In 1852 the state Whig Party parlayed his popularity in the Parkman case into a nomination for the governorship, which Clifford reluctantly accepted. The race was a difficult one, dominated by the presidential contest and candidate stands on the state's temperance "Maine law". In addition to Whig support, Clifford was nominated by a party opposed to the Maine law, while one of his opponents, Horace Mann, was running with both Free Soil and pro-Maine law nominations. The Whigs had been divided by their reactions to the Compromise of 1850, and the national election (held one week before the state election) saw many Whigs voting for Democrat Franklin Pierce. In a three way race involving Clifford, Mann, and Democrat Henry W. Bishop, Clifford received 45% of the vote. A majority requirement still in effect for popular election, he was elected by the state senate 29–4 over Bishop, although fractious Whigs demanded the replacement of Senator John Davis in exchange for their support for him.

After his single term as governor, Clifford refused to stand for reelection, preferring to work as a lawyer. His successor, Governor Emory Washburn, reappointed him to be attorney general, an office he held from 1854 to 1858. This term of service notably included the tenure of Know Nothing governor Henry J. Gardner. Gardner, who had politically been a Whig before the advent of the Know Nothings, retained Clifford in the office, and the two of them blunted some of anti-immigrant legislation and (in their view) extreme reform proposals of the Know Nothing legislature. During Gardner's tenure, the state constitution was amended so that the office of attorney general was elected rather than appointed. In the election of 1858, Stephen Henry Phillips was elected to replace Clifford.

== Later political and legal work ==
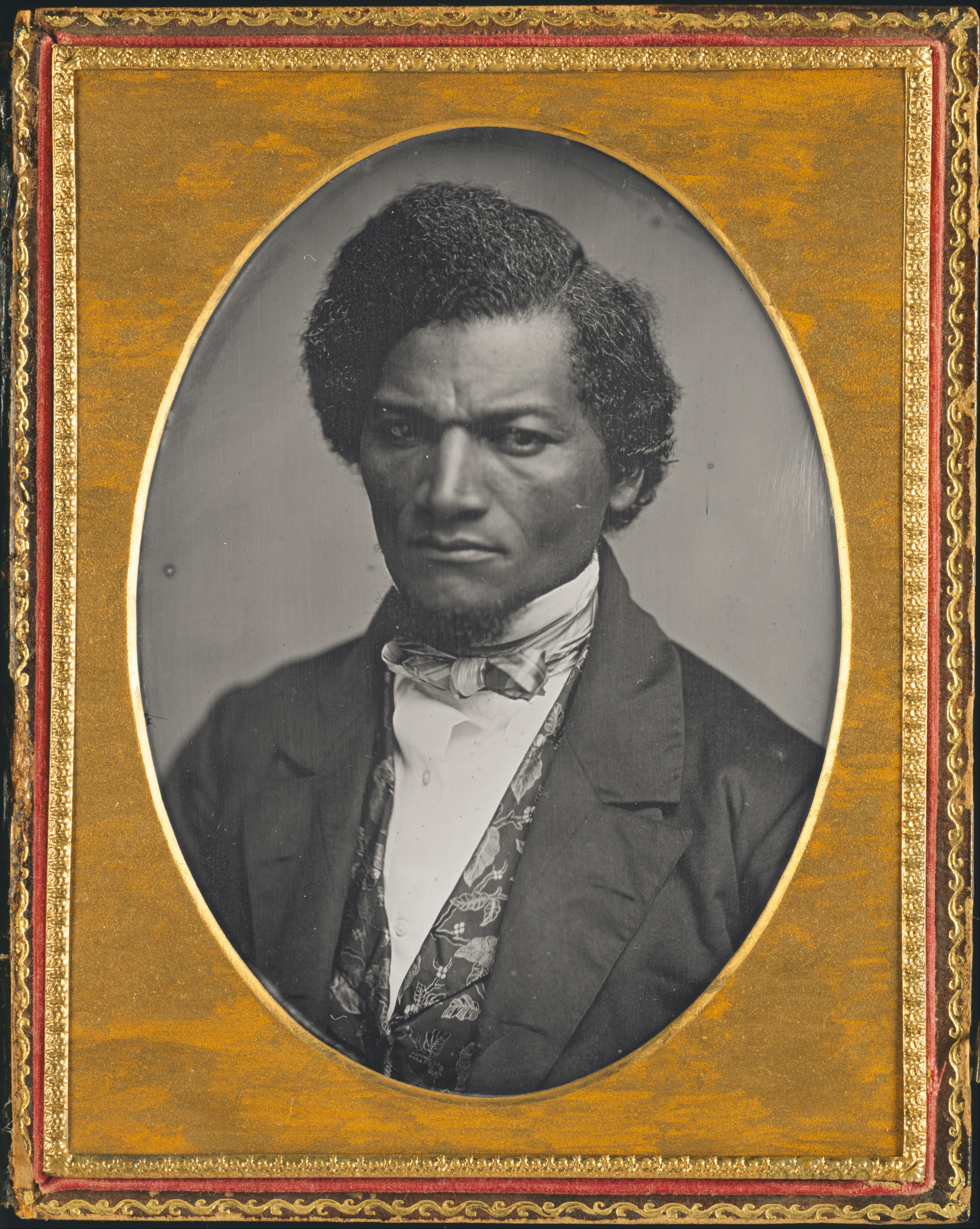
Frederick Douglass, daguerreotype c. 1850

The state hired Clifford in 1859 to assist Phillips in prosecuting what turned out to be the final stages of a long-running (200 year) series of issues concerning the state's boundary with Rhode Island. Phillips and Clifford traveled to Washington, D.C., in January 1861 to make their appearance before the United States Supreme Court. At the time, tensions between North and South were exceptionally high, and United States Attorney General Edwin Stanton expressed to them concern that Washington might be attacked by rebel forces. Their letter to Massachusetts governor John Albion Andrew was one of the warnings that prompted Andrew to begin organizing Massachusetts volunteer regiments for the American Civil War.

Clifford was, like other conservative Whigs, politically opposed to the abolitionist movement; he was described by former slave Frederick Douglass as "pro-slavery" and "about the most aristocratic gentleman in Bristol County". However, once the Civil War broke out he supported the Union cause and the state's participation in the conflict. In 1862 he joined in a call for the formation of an antiabolition party to oppose the Republicans. The "People's Party" was formed primarily by people who had supported the pro-Union Constitutional Union Party of 1860, and failed to gain traction because of President Abraham Lincoln's preliminary Emancipation Proclamation issued in September. Clifford was elected to the Massachusetts State Senate that year, where he served as its president. Clifford supported Lincoln for reelection in 1864. In 1868 he was chosen a presidential elector, casting his vote for Ulysses S. Grant.

In 1865 Clifford was chosen to act as one of the special counsels prosecuting former Confederate President Jefferson Davis. Davis was to be prosecuted for treason, but for a variety of reasons the charges were eventually dropped after four years of political and legal wrangling. Clifford contributed to a debate in 1866 over the difficulty of prosecuting Davis in Virginia, noting that without essentially packing the jury, a failed prosecution would result in the awkward outcome of a Virginia jury in some sense overturning the outcome of the war. He resigned from these duties in July 1866.

== Later years ==
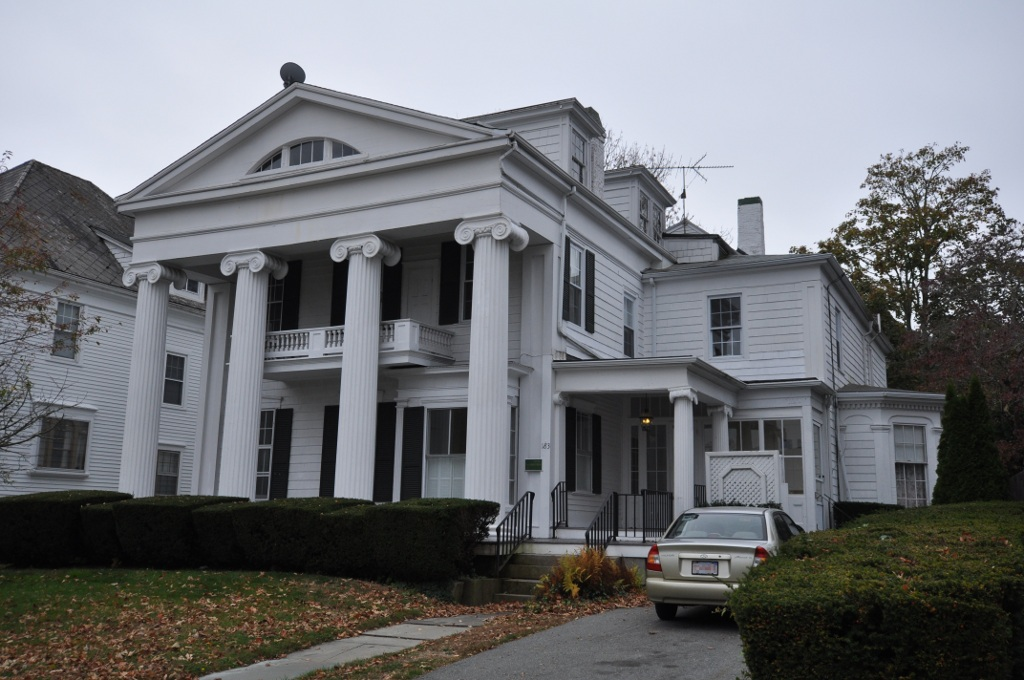
Clifford's house in New Bedford

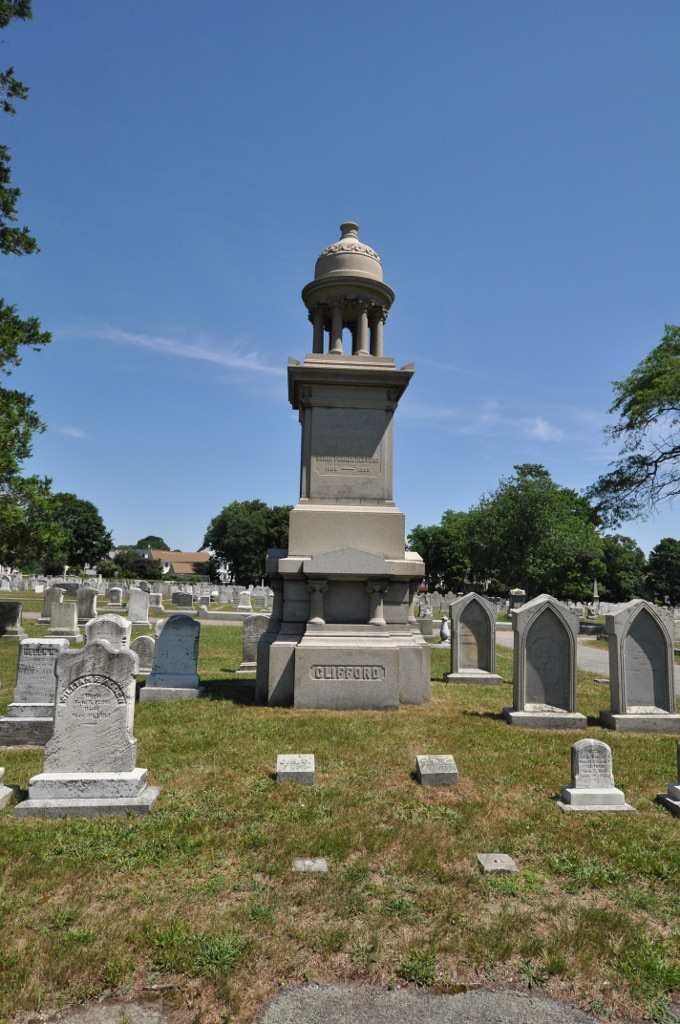
Clifford's grave marker in the Rural Cemetery

In 1867 Clifford retired from the legal profession and became president of the Boston and Providence Railroad. During his tenure the railroad constructed a new terminal station in Boston at Park Square. He received the degree of LL.D. from Brown in 1849, Amherst in 1853, and Harvard in 1853. For several years he was president of the Harvard Board of Overseers. After the American Civil War he was appointed by George Peabody to the board of trustees of the Peabody Education Fund, a philanthropic initiative for building educational resources in the post-war South. In his later years he was offered, but turned down, a number of diplomatic postings in Europe, including Ambassador to Russia and Ambassador to the Ottoman Empire. He was elected a member of the American Antiquarian Society in 1870. In 1873 and 1875 he traveled to warmer climates in a bid to improve his declining health.

In 1875 Clifford was appointed to a diplomatic commission established pursuant to the 1871 Treaty of Washington with the United Kingdom to resolve fishery issues. However, owing to a delay occasioned by the difficulty in selecting a neutral third commissioner, Clifford never assumed his duties. He died of heart disease, after a short illness, on January 2, 1876, at his home in New Bedford, and was buried in New Bedford's Rural Cemetery. Clifford's Greek Revival mansion still stands on Orchard Street in New Bedford, contributing to the County Street Historic District.

== Clifford and Melville ==
Clifford had a friendly and collegial relationship with Chief Justice Lemuel Shaw, who was the father-in-law of writer Herman Melville. Clifford and Melville crossed paths on a number of occasions, most notably on Nantucket in the summer of 1852. On this occasion Clifford recounted to Melville a story about one of his early cases. Melville later wrote him, asking for further details, and Clifford sent Melville journal entries on the case. Melville ended up using the material for Isle of the Cross, a story that was never published.

== See also ==
- 83rd Massachusetts General Court (1862)

== Notes ==
Party political offices
| Preceded by Robert Charles Winthrop | Whig nominee for Governor of Massachusetts; 1852 | Succeeded by Emory Washburn |
Political offices
| Preceded by George S. Boutwell | Governor of Massachusetts; January 11, 1853 – January 12, 1854 | Succeeded by Emory Washburn |
Legal offices
| Vacant Office abolished since 1843 Title last held by James T. Austin | Attorney General of Massachusetts; 1849–1853 | Succeeded by Rufus Choate |
| Preceded by Rufus Choate | Attorney General of Massachusetts; 1854–1858 | Succeeded by Stephen Henry Phillips |
