= Ephraim M. Wright =

American politician

12th Massachusetts Secretary of the Commonwealth
- In office 1853–1856
- Governor: John H. Clifford
- Preceded by: Amasa Walker
- Succeeded by: Francis De Witt

Personal details
- Party: Whig
- Profession: Teacher, Clergyman

Ephraim M. Wright was an American teacher, clergyman and politician who served as 12th Massachusetts Secretary of the Commonwealth from 1853 to 1856.

== Career ==
For many years Wright was engaged in teaching and political work. Wright became a minister in middle life. On July 2, 1861, Wright was ordained and installed as the eighth Pastor of the Congregational Church in Bethlehem, Connecticut, Wright was dismissed from the Pastorate on October 2, 1866. For four years, from 1864 to 1869 Wright was the acting Pastor of Congregational Church in Terryville, Connecticut.

Political offices
Preceded by Amasa Walker	12th Massachusetts Secretary of the Commonwealth; 1853–1853	Succeeded by Francis De Witt
