= 1997–98 Coventry City F.C. season =

Coventry City F.C.
1997–98 season
- Chairman: Bryan Richardson
- Manager: Gordon Strachan
- Stadium: Highfield Road
- FA Premier League: 11th
- FA Cup: Quarter-final
- League Cup: Fourth round
- Top goalscorer: League: Dion Dublin (18); All: Dion Dublin (23)
- Highest home attendance: 23,054 (vs. Manchester United, 28 December)
- Lowest home attendance: 15,900 (vs. Crystal Palace, 24 September)
- Average home league attendance: 19,718

During the 1997–98 English football season, Coventry City competed in the FA Premier League.

== Season summary ==
After a last-day "houdini" act and the bonus of Middlesbrough having 3 points deducted kept Coventry up in the 1996–97 season, manager Gordon Strachan was determined to avoid another season of struggle. He achieved it, and an 11th-place finish was Coventry's highest in four seasons. However, even though they only suffered 10 defeats all season (the fourth least amount, after Arsenal, Manchester United and Liverpool), they staggeringly drew 16 games which ultimately prevented them from finishing any higher. Their secure finish was helped no end by the loyalty of striker Dion Dublin, who pledged his future to the club after turning down an offer from Blackburn Rovers. Coventry were, in fact, 17th on Boxing Day 1997, but a 3–2 win over Manchester United, with no small thanks to late goals from Dublin and Darren Huckerby, appeared to kickstart a sudden surge in form as by late March, the club found themselves in 9th. Right up to the final day of the season, the Sky Blues were within a shout of a UEFA Cup place, but they were beaten to it by local rivals Aston Villa. The two places above them were occupied by two other local rivals – Derby County and Leicester City.

== Final league table ==
Pos	Team	Pld	W	D	L	GF	GA	GD	Pts	Qualification or relegation
9	Derby County	38	16	7	15	52	49	+3	55	
10	Leicester City	38	13	14	11	51	41	+10	53	
11	Coventry City	38	12	16	10	46	44	+2	52	
12	Southampton	38	14	6	18	50	55	−5	48	
13	Newcastle United	38	11	11	16	35	44	−9	44	Qualification for the Cup Winners' Cup first round (Note: As Arsenal qualified for the Champions League, their Cup Winners' Cup place as FA Cup winners defaulted to Newcastle United, the runners-up.)

Source: Premier League
Rules for classification: 1) points; 2) goal difference; 3) number of goals scored.
Notes:

Results summary

Overall								Home						Away					
Pld	W	D	L	GF	GA	GD	Pts	W	D	L	GF	GA	GD	W	D	L	GF	GA	GD
38	12	16	10	46	44	+2	52	8	9	2	26	17	+9	4	7	8	20	27	−7

Source: 1997–98 FA Premier League table

Results by round

Round	1	2	3	4	5	6	7	8	9	10	11	12	13	14	15	16	17	18	19	20	21	22	23	24	25	26	27	28	29	30	31	32	33	34	35	36	37	38
Ground	H	A	H	H	A	H	A	H	A	H	A	H	A	H	A	H	A	H	A	A	H	A	H	A	H	A	H	A	A	H	A	H	A	H	A	H	H	A
Result	W	L	D	D	L	W	D	D	D	D	L	D	W	D	L	L	L	W	L	L	W	L	D	W	W	W	W	W	D	W	D	L	D	D	D	D	W	D
Position	1	9	10	12	12	8	11	11	12	12	15	15	12	10	12	15	16	14	16	17	13	16	15	13	12	10	10	10	10	9	10	11	10	11	10	11	11	11

Source: 11v11.com: 1997–98 Coventry City results
A = Away; H = Home; W = Win; D = Draw; L = Loss

== Results ==
Coventry City's score comes first

=== Legend ===
Win	Draw	Loss

=== FA Premier League ===
Date	Opponent	Venue	Result	Attendance	Scorers
9 August 1997	Chelsea	H	3–2	22,686	Dublin (3)
11 August 1997	Arsenal	A	0–2	37,324	
23 August 1997	Bolton Wanderers	H	2–2	16,633	Telfer, Huckerby
27 August 1997	West Ham United	H	1–1	18,289	Huckerby
30 August 1997	Manchester United	A	0–3	55,074	
13 September 1997	Southampton	H	1–0	18,659	Soltvedt
20 September 1997	Sheffield Wednesday	A	0–0	21,087	
24 September 1997	Crystal Palace	H	1–1	15,900	Dublin
28 September 1997	Blackburn Rovers	A	0–0	19,086	
4 October 1997	Leeds United	H	0–0	17,770	
20 October 1997	Barnsley	A	0–2	17,463	
25 October 1997	Everton	H	0–0	18,760	
1 November 1997	Wimbledon	A	2–1	11,201	Huckerby, Dublin
8 November 1997	Newcastle United	H	2–2	22,679	Dublin (2)
22 November 1997	Derby County	A	1–3	29,351	Huckerby
29 November 1997	Leicester City	H	0–2	18,309	
6 December 1997	Aston Villa	A	0–3	33,250	
13 December 1997	Tottenham Hotspur	H	4–0	19,499	Huckerby (2), Breen, Hall
20 December 1997	Liverpool	A	0–1	39,707	
26 December 1997	West Ham United	A	0–1	24,532	
28 December 1997	Manchester United	H	3–2	23,054	Whelan, Dublin (pen), Huckerby
10 January 1998	Chelsea	A	1–3	34,647	Telfer
17 January 1998	Arsenal	H	2–2	22,864	Whelan, Dublin (pen)
31 January 1998	Bolton Wanderers	A	5–1	25,000	Whelan, Huckerby (2), Dublin (2)
7 February 1998	Sheffield Wednesday	H	1–0	18,375	Dublin (pen)
18 February 1998	Southampton	A	2–1	15,091	Whelan, Huckerby
21 February 1998	Barnsley	H	1–0	20,265	Dublin (pen)
28 February 1998	Crystal Palace	A	3–0	21,810	Telfer, Moldovan, Dublin
14 March 1998	Newcastle United	A	0–0	36,767	
28 March 1998	Derby County	H	1–0	18,705	Huckerby
4 April 1998	Leicester City	A	1–1	21,137	Whelan
11 April 1998	Aston Villa	H	1–2	22,792	Whelan
13 April 1998	Tottenham Hotspur	A	1–1	33,463	Dublin
19 April 1998	Liverpool	H	1–1	22,721	Dublin (pen)
25 April 1998	Leeds United	A	3–3	36,522	Huckerby (3)
29 April 1998	Wimbledon	H	0–0	17,968	
2 May 1998	Blackburn Rovers	H	2–0	18,794	Dublin (pen), Boateng
10 May 1998	Everton	A	1–1	40,109	Dublin

=== FA Cup ===
Round	Date	Opponent	Venue	Result	Attendance	Goalscorers
R3	3 January 1998	Liverpool	A	3–1	33,888	Huckerby, Dublin, Telfer
R4	24 January 1998	Derby County	H	2–0	22,824	Dublin (2)
R5	14 February 1998	Aston Villa	A	1–0	36,979	Moldovan
QF	7 March 1998	Sheffield United	H	1–1	23,084	Dublin (pen)
QFR	17 March 1998	Sheffield United	A	1–1 (lost 1–3 on pens)	29,034	Telfer

=== League Cup ===
Round	Date	Opponent	Venue	Result	Attendance	Goalscorers
R2 1st Leg	16 September 1997	Blackpool	A	0–1	5,884	
R2 2nd Leg	1 October 1997	Blackpool	H	3–1 (won 3–2 on agg)	9,565	McAllister (2, 1 pen), Dublin
R3	15 October 1997	Everton	H	4–1	10,087	Hall, Salako (2), Haworth
R4	18 November 1997	Arsenal	A	0–1	30,199	

== Squad ==
Note: Flags indicate national team as defined under FIFA eligibility rules; some limited exceptions apply. Players may hold more than one non-FIFA nationality.

No.	Pos.	Nation	Player
1	GK	(England) ENG	Steve Ogrizovic
2	DF	(England) ENG	Richard Shaw
3	DF	(England) ENG	David Burrows
4	DF	(England) ENG	Paul Williams
5	DF	(Republic of Ireland) IRL	Liam Daish
6	DF	(Republic of Ireland) IRL	Gary Breen
7	FW	(England) ENG	Darren Huckerby
8	FW	(England) ENG	Noel Whelan
9	FW	(England) ENG	Dion Dublin
10	MF	(Scotland) SCO	Gary McAllister (captain)
12	DF	(Scotland) SCO	Paul Telfer
13	GK	(Sweden) SWE	Magnus Hedman
14	MF	(Norway) NOR	Trond Egil Soltvedt
15	MF	(Belgium) BEL	Philippe Clement
16	MF	(Ghana) GHA	George Boateng
17	MF	(Republic of Ireland) IRL	Willie Boland
18	DF	(England) ENG	Marcus Hall

No.	Pos.	Nation	Player
19	MF	(Denmark) DEN	Martin Johansen
20	MF	(Northern Ireland) NIR	Michael O'Neill
21	FW	(England) ENG	Andy Ducros
22	FW	(Wales) WAL	Simon Haworth
23	DF	(Sweden) SWE	Roland Nilsson
24	FW	(Romania) ROU	Viorel Moldovan
28	MF	(Scotland) SCO	Gavin Strachan
29	DF	(England) ENG	Scott Goodwin
30	MF	(England) ENG	John Eustace
31	FW	(England) ENG	Adam Willis
32	DF	(Republic of Ireland) IRL	Barry Prenderville
33	MF	(England) ENG	Chris Barnett
34	MF	(Republic of Ireland) IRL	Barry Quinn
35	FW	(England) ENG	Craig Faulconbridge
36	DF	(Republic of Ireland) IRL	John Andrews
37	DF	(England) ENG	Sam Shilton

=== Left club during season ===
Note: Flags indicate national team as defined under FIFA eligibility rules; some limited exceptions apply. Players may hold more than one non-FIFA nationality.

No.	Pos.	Nation	Player
11	MF	(England) ENG	John Salako (to Bolton Wanderers)
15	FW	(Bermuda) BER	Kyle Lightbourne (to Stoke City)
16	MF	(England) ENG	Kevin Richardson (to Southampton)

No.	Pos.	Nation	Player
24	DF	(England) ENG	Brian Borrows (to Swindon Town)
26	GK	(Scotland) SCO	Scott Howie (on loan from Motherwell)

=== Reserve squad ===
Note: Flags indicate national team as defined under FIFA eligibility rules; some limited exceptions apply. Players may hold more than one non-FIFA nationality.

No. / Pos. / Nation / Player; - / MF / (England) ENG / Martin Devaney	No. / Pos. / Nation / Player; - / FW / (England) ENG / Chukki Eribenne

== Transfers ==
=== In ===
Date	Pos	Name	From	Fee
19 June 1997	MF	Trond Egil Soltvedt	Rosenborg	£500,000
4 July 1997	FW	Kyle Lightbourne	Walsall	£500,000
7 July 1997	GK	Magnus Hedman	AIK	Free transfer
19 June 1997	MF	Martin Johansen	Copenhagen	Free transfer
29 July 1997	DF	Roland Nilsson	Helsingborg	£200,000
18 December 1997	DF	George Boateng	Feyenoord	£250,000
2 January 1998	FW	Viorel Moldovan	Grasshoppers	£3,250,000
26 March 1998	MF	Philippe Clement	Racing Genk	£625,000

=== Out ===
Date	Pos	Name	To	Fee
1 July 1997	MF	Chris McMenamin	Peterborough United	Free transfer
4 July 1997	MF	Eoin Jess	Aberdeen	£700,000
14 July 1997	FW	Peter Ndlovu	Birmingham City	£1,600,000
1 August 1997	GK	John Filan	Blackburn Rovers	£700,000
1 August 1997	GK	Jed Sumner	Cambridge United	Free transfer
9 September 1997	MF	Kevin Richardson	Southampton	Transfer
14 November 1997	DF	Brian Borrows	Swindon Town	Free transfer
16 February 1998	FW	Kyle Lightbourne	Stoke City	£500,000

Transfers in: ▼£5,325,000
Transfers out: ▲£3,500,000
Total spending: ▼£1,825,000

== Statistics ==
=== Appearances and goals ===
No.	Pos	Nat	Player	Total		FA Premier League		FA Cup		League Cup	
No.	Pos	Nat	Player	Apps	Goals	Apps	Goals	Apps	Goals	Apps	Goals
Goalkeepers
1	GK	(England) ENG	Steve Ogrizovic	30	0	24	0	2	0	4	0
13	GK	(Sweden) SWE	Magnus Hedman	17	0	14	0	3	0	0	0
Defenders
2	DF	(England) ENG	Richard Shaw	40	0	33	0	3	0	4	0
3	DF	(England) ENG	David Burrows	42	0	33	0	5	0	4	0
4	DF	(England) ENG	Paul Williams	25	0	17+3	0	1	0	4	0
6	DF	(Republic of Ireland) IRL	Gary Breen	39	1	30	1	5	0	3+1	0
12	DF	(Scotland) SCO	Paul Telfer	39	5	33	3	4	2	2	0
18	DF	(England) ENG	Marcus Hall	33	2	20+5	1	2+2	0	3+1	1
23	DF	(Sweden) SWE	Roland Nilsson	39	0	32	0	4	0	3	0
37	DF	(England) ENG	Sam Shilton	2	0	2	0	0	0	0	0
Midfielders
10	MF	(Scotland) SCO	Gary McAllister	18	2	14	0	0	0	4	2
14	MF	(Norway) NOR	Trond Egil Soltvedt	36	1	26+4	1	3+1	0	1+1	0
16	MF	(Ghana) GHA	George Boateng	19	1	14	1	5	0	0	0
17	MF	(Republic of Ireland) IRL	Willie Boland	22	0	8+11	0	0+1	0	1+1	0
20	MF	(Northern Ireland) NIR	Michael O'Neill	5	0	2+2	0	0	0	1	0
28	MF	(Scotland) SCO	Gavin Strachan	13	0	2+7	0	2+2	0	0	0
Forwards
7	FW	(England) ENG	Darren Huckerby	40	15	32+2	14	5	1	0+1	0
8	FW	(England) ENG	Noel Whelan	25	6	21	6	4	0	0	0
9	FW	(England) ENG	Dion Dublin	43	23	36	18	5	4	2	1
19	FW	(Denmark) DEN	Martin Johansen	3	0	0+2	0	0	0	1	0
21	FW	(England) ENG	Andy Ducros	4	0	1+2	0	0	0	0+1	0
22	FW	(Wales) WAL	Simon Haworth	13	1	4+6	0	0+1	0	2	1
24	FW	(Romania) ROU	Viorel Moldovan	14	2	5+5	1	2+2	1	0	0
Players who left the club during the season
11	MF	(England) ENG	John Salako	13	2	11	0	0	0	2	2
15	FW	(Bermuda) BER	Kyle Lightbourne	10	0	1+6	0	0	0	3	0
16	MF	(England) ENG	Kevin Richardson	3	0	3	0	0	0	0	0

=== Starting 11 ===
Considering starts in all competitions

No.	Pos.	Nat.	Name	MS	Notes
1	GK	(England)	Steve Ogrizovic	30	
23	RB	(Sweden)	Roland Nilsson	39	
6	CB	(Republic of Ireland)	Gary Breen	38	
2	CB	(England)	Richard Shaw	40	
3	LB	(England)	David Burrows	42	
12	CM	(Scotland)	Paul Telfer	39	
16	CM	(Ghana)	George Boateng	19	Marcus Hall has 25 starts
10	CM	(Scotland)	Gary McAllister	18	Noel Whelan has 25 starts
14	AM	(Norway)	Trond Egil Soltvedt	30	
9	CF	(England)	Dion Dublin	43	
7	CF	(England)	Darren Huckerby	37	
