= Dion Dublin =

English footballer (born 1969)

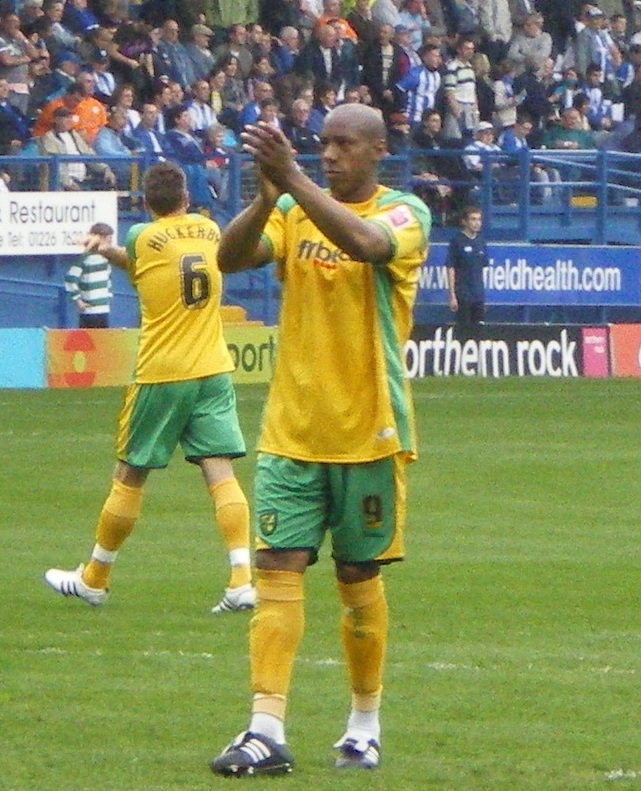
- Dublin with Norwich City in 2008

Personal information
- Full name: Dion Dublin
- Date of birth: 22 April 1969 (age 57)
- Place of birth: Leicester, England
- Height: 6 ft 2 in (1.88 m)
- Positions: Forward; centre-back

Team information
- Current team: Cambridge United (Club Director)

Youth career
- Wigston Fields
- 1985–1988: Norwich City

Senior career*
Years	Team	Apps	(Gls)
1988–1992	Cambridge United	156	(52)
1988	→ Barnet (loan)	1	(0)
1988	→ Wycombe Wanderers (loan)	2	(0)
1992–1994	Manchester United	12	(2)
1994–1998	Coventry City	145	(61)
1998–2004	Aston Villa	155	(48)
2002	→ Millwall (loan)	5	(2)
2004–2006	Leicester City	58	(5)
2006	Celtic	11	(1)
2006–2008	Norwich City	70	(12)
Total		615	(183)

International career
1998	England	4	(0)
- * Club domestic league appearances and goals

Dion Dublin (born 22 April 1969) is an English former professional footballer, television presenter and pundit. He is a club director of Cambridge United.

As a player he was a forward, notably playing in the Premier League for Manchester United, Coventry City and Aston Villa. He also had spells in the Scottish Premiership with Celtic, in the Conference with Wycombe Wanderers, and in The Football League with Cambridge United, Barnet, Millwall, Leicester City and Norwich City. He was capped four times for England.

Following his retirement from football, Dublin moved into the entertainment business. He is also an amateur percussionist, and invented a percussion instrument called "The Dube". In 2011, he accompanied Ocean Colour Scene in a gig at the University of East Anglia, Norwich. In 2015, he joined the presenting team on the BBC One daytime show Homes Under the Hammer and has appeared as a regular pundit for BBC Sport on Football Focus, Match of the Day and Final Score. He also occasionally provides co-commentary on live televised FA Cup games.

== Club career ==
=== Norwich City ===
Dublin was born in Leicester. While at school he played for several Leicestershire youth teams, including Wigston Fields and Thurmaston Magpies. He then went on to begin his professional footballing career with Norwich City after leaving school in 1985, but never made a first-team appearance and was released by the club in 1988.

=== Cambridge United ===
In August 1988, Dublin joined Cambridge United on a free transfer, as a centre-forward, which had been his position at Norwich City. However, due to injuries he had to make a number of appearances at centre-half. His prolific goalscoring helped United to successive promotions. During the 1988–89 season, Dublin was then loaned out for short spells in the Conference with Barnet and Wycombe Wanderers. The 1989–90 season saw Cambridge promoted from the Fourth Division via the play-offs, when Dublin became the first ever scorer in a Wembley play-off final.

In the 1990–91 season, the club were champions of the Third Division, and the club also reached the quarter-final of the FA Cup in both seasons, with Dublin scoring at Arsenal in 1991. In the 1991–92 season, he played a big part in helping Cambridge to their highest ever finishing position in the football league, by finishing in fifth place in the last season of the old Second Division, but when Cambridge failed to win promotion to the new Premier League via the play-offs, Dublin was put up for sale. He has since spoken many times of his affection for Cambridge United.

=== Manchester United ===
Having scored against them in a League Cup tie the previous autumn, Manchester United manager Alex Ferguson signed Dublin for £1 million on 7 August 1992, fighting off competition from Chelsea and Everton. Dublin was something of a surprise purchase for United, after Ferguson had tried to sign Alan Shearer from Southampton but lost out to Blackburn Rovers.

He scored in United's fourth Premier League game of the 1992–93 season, a late winner in United's first Premier league victory as they beat Southampton 1–0 at The Dell. However, on 2 September, he suffered a broken leg against Crystal Palace in a 1–0 win at Old Trafford, after a tackle by Eric Young, and was out of action for six months. By the time he had recovered, however, United had signed Eric Cantona and the Frenchman was firmly established as first choice strike partner to Mark Hughes. United won the league that season for the first time since 1967, but Dublin failed to make the 10 Premier League appearances required to automatically gain a title winner's medal. However, he was given a medal as a result of special dispensation from the Premier League.

In the 1993–94 season, Dublin regained his fitness, but his first team chances were restricted by the successful partnership of Cantona and Hughes. In December 1993, Ferguson agreed a deal with Everton manager Howard Kendall, that would have seen Dublin moving to Goodison Park, but a member of Everton's board of directors, apparently feeling that Dublin was not worth the money Kendall had offered United, intervened to prevent the transfer going through – this dispute sparked Kendall's resignation as manager. Dublin would remain a United player for another nine months, but never managed to claim a regular place in the first team.

He managed five league appearances that season, scoring once in a 3–2 home win over Oldham Athletic in early April. He scored having been on the pitch for just a matter of minutes after being substituted on; his goal helping secure a vital victory in the title run-in during a spell when United started to drop points and |Blackburn Rovers were closing in on them. He also managed a further goal in the Football League Cup second round first leg, as United were beaten 2–1 by Stoke City at the Victoria Ground. The goal against Oldham was the only competitive goal that Dublin scored for United at Old Trafford. He was left out of the FA Cup winning team against Chelsea and failed to make enough appearances to merit another Premier League title winners medal.

In September 1994, he was sold to Coventry City for £2 million, which, at the time, was a record signing for Coventry City and one of the largest fees received by Manchester United.

=== Coventry City ===
In four years with Coventry, Dublin established himself as one of the Premier League's top strikers and during the 1997–98 season won the first of his four full England caps. That season, he equalled the Coventry City record for most goals in a top division season, with 23 goals in all competitions as they finished 11th.

Following Phil Neal's departure in 1995, the arrival of Ron Atkinson and Gordon Strachan would see Dublin fit into an attacking team in the typical Atkinson mould. It included the likes of Noel Whelan, John Salako and Darren Huckerby to add to the already attack minded Peter Ndlovu. The addition of Gary McAllister, following UEFA Euro 1996, was expected to provide mid-table stability after two narrowly won relegation battles, but the team's defensive frailties often undermined Dublin's scoring at the other end. This culminated in possibly one of the greatest escapes in Premier League history in May 1997. Despite having won away to Liverpool (Dublin scoring in the dying seconds) and at home to Chelsea at the start of April, the Sky Blues could only manage two points from their following three games. City went into the final day second from bottom of the table, needing not only to beat Tottenham away from home, but also for results elsewhere in the league to go their way for them to escape relegation. They achieved the most unlikely of escapes; first-half goals from Dublin and Paul Williams gave Coventry a 2–1 win at White Hart Lane, while Sunderland lost at Wimbledon and Middlesbrough could only manage a draw at Leeds. Coventry finished the season in 17th place, one point outside the relegation zone.

The following season, the Sky Blues improved at home and enjoyed a season of mid-table security. Dublin formed an impressive partnership with Darren Huckerby which not only produced some memorable goals, but also propelled the Sky Blues to the FA Cup sixth round against Sheffield United; a game they narrowly lost in a penalty shoot-out.

On 8 November 1997, Dublin scored one of the most bizarre goals in Premier League history. Early in the match against Newcastle, goalkeeper Shay Given collected a cross from the right and placed the ball in front of him. The ball was still in play, and Dublin, who had attempted to meet the cross and was now behind Given, reappeared and calmly slotted the ball into the empty goal. This led to the joke: "Shay Given, the only Irishman who doesn't know where Dublin is." The match ended 2-2, with Dublin also scoring City's second goal in the second half.

The 1997–98 season also saw Dublin share elite status as the Premier League's top scorer with Blackburn Rovers' Chris Sutton and Liverpool's Michael Owen – each Englishman scoring 18 league goals. During this season, Blackburn manager Roy Hodgson tabled a bid which Dublin rejected. He remained at Highfield Road and contributed to Coventry's best finish to date in the Premiership (11th).

=== Aston Villa ===
Dublin was controversially excluded from the England 1998 FIFA World Cup squad, despite being the Premier League's joint top-scorer in the 1997–98 season. However, his exploits at club level were still attracting attention from other clubs, and in November 1998, the 29-year-old chose to move to Aston Villa for £5.75 million. In his first four games for the club, he would score seven goals, including a memorable hat-trick against Southampton in only his second game for Villa. As a result, he is one of only six players to score in the first four consecutive games for a Premier League club.

In December 1999, while playing for Aston Villa against Sheffield Wednesday, he sustained a life-threatening broken neck, as a result of which he permanently has a titanium plate holding three neck vertebrae together. Just days before suffering this injury, it was reported in the News of the World that Dublin would soon be sold by Aston Villa for a fee of around £6 million as the club looked to finance a fall in its share value as a result of manager John Gregory's heavy expenditure on players.

However, the injury did not end Dublin's career and he was back in action three months later.

In April 2000, a week after returning to the team, he helped Aston Villa reach their first FA Cup final in 43 years, which they lost 1–0 against Chelsea, scoring a penalty in the semi-final shoot-out against Bolton Wanderers.

Faced with competition for a first-team place by new signings Juan Pablo Ángel and Peter Crouch, Dublin spent several weeks on loan at First Division Millwall towards the end of the 2001–02 season. In his time there, he scored two goals, against Stockport County and Grimsby Town in five league matches to help them into the play-offs, where despite Dublin's goal in the first leg of the semi-final, against Villa's arch rivals Birmingham City, Millwall lost 2–1 on aggregate. Following Millwall's elimination from the play-offs, Dublin returned to Aston Villa in time for their final game of the season, against Chelsea at Stamford Bridge. He replaced Darius Vassell in the 84th minute and scored Villa's third goal in a 3–1 win.

Dublin once again found himself a first-choice striker at the start of the 2002–03 season, partnering Vassell up front. In March 2003, he was sent off at Villa Park for a headbutt on Robbie Savage in the Birmingham derby match, which ended 2–0 to Birmingham City.

=== Leicester City ===
When his contract expired in the summer of 2004, he was given a free transfer. He was signed by Leicester City, who had been relegated from the Premier League to the Championship. In his first season with the club, he scored only four goals in 38 competitive matches. During the 2005–06 season, Dublin lost his place as the team's main striker, but continued to appear as a defender. His contract at Leicester City was terminated by mutual consent on 30 January 2006.

=== Celtic ===
He was snapped up quickly by then Celtic manager Gordon Strachan, to cover for the loss of Chris Sutton, on a contract until the end of the season. At Celtic, Dublin achieved double success, with Scottish League Cup and Scottish Premier League winner's medals. On 19 March 2006, Dublin came on as a substitute and scored the final goal as Celtic defeated Dunfermline 3–0 to win the Scottish League Cup final, and also played enough matches with Celtic to merit a title medal. In the league, he made three league starts and eight substitute appearances for Celtic, scoring once against Kilmarnock on 9 April 2006 in a 4–1 win at Rugby Park. Despite one or two decent performances for the Parkhead outfit, Dublin was released by Strachan in May 2006.

=== Return to Norwich City ===
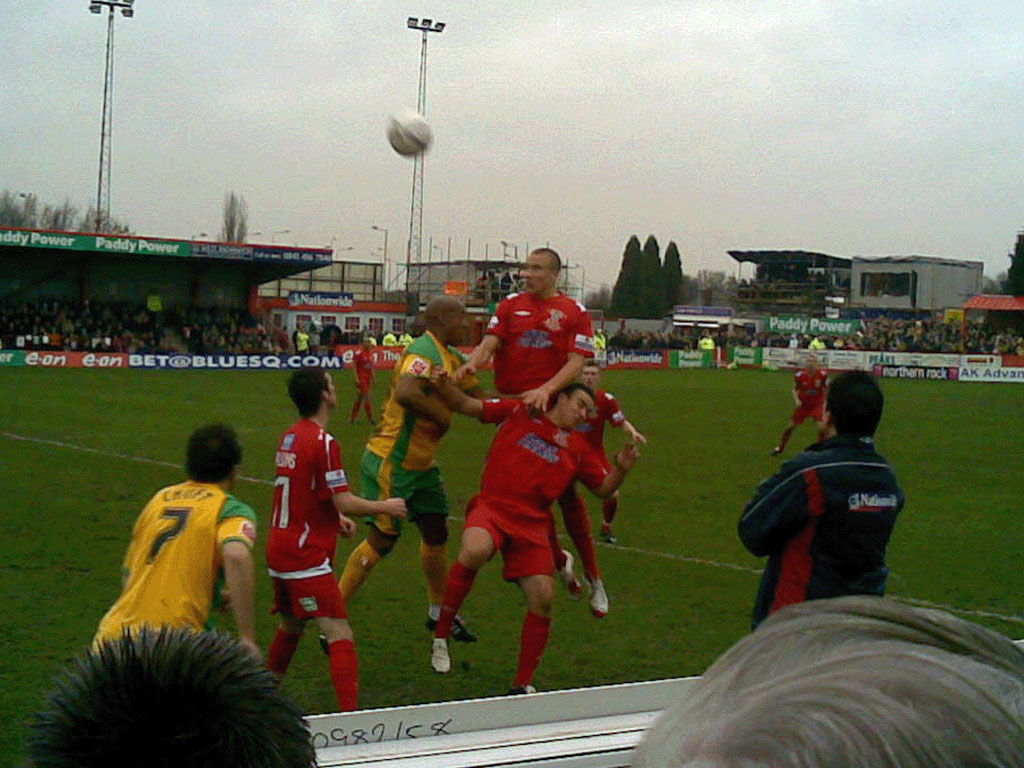
Dublin battling in the air against Tom Kemp in the FA Cup game with Tamworth

On 20 September 2006, Norwich City announced that Dublin had joined them until the end of the 2006–07 season. It marked a return, almost 20 years after leaving, for Dublin to the club where he began his career. He made his debut on 23 September 2006 when he came on as substitute against Plymouth Argyle. He scored his first competitive goal in Norwich City colours in a 3–3 draw against Queens Park Rangers on 14 October 2006 at Loftus Road. Steve Wilson cited Dublin as the main inspiration behind Norwich's 4–1 FA Cup 3rd Round win at Tamworth, in which the striker scored two goals and set up numerous chances for other teammates.

Dublin was an important figure in Norwich securing safety from relegation to League One and the supporters recognised his contribution by voting him in second place in the Norwich City player of the year award, and on 23 May 2007 he ended speculation about his future by signing a new one-year contract at Norwich, keeping him at the club until the end of the 2007–08 season. On 2 September 2007, while working as a pundit on a match between Aston Villa and Chelsea, Dublin said that this season would be his last as a professional footballer, citing the fact that his "bones have started to talk to him" as the reason, meaning that he did not think his body can handle another season.

"It was incredible at Hillsborough. If you think of the stadia I could've retired at, away from Norwich of course, with the history and the feeling, then Sheffield Wednesday was the perfect place".

— Dion Dublin

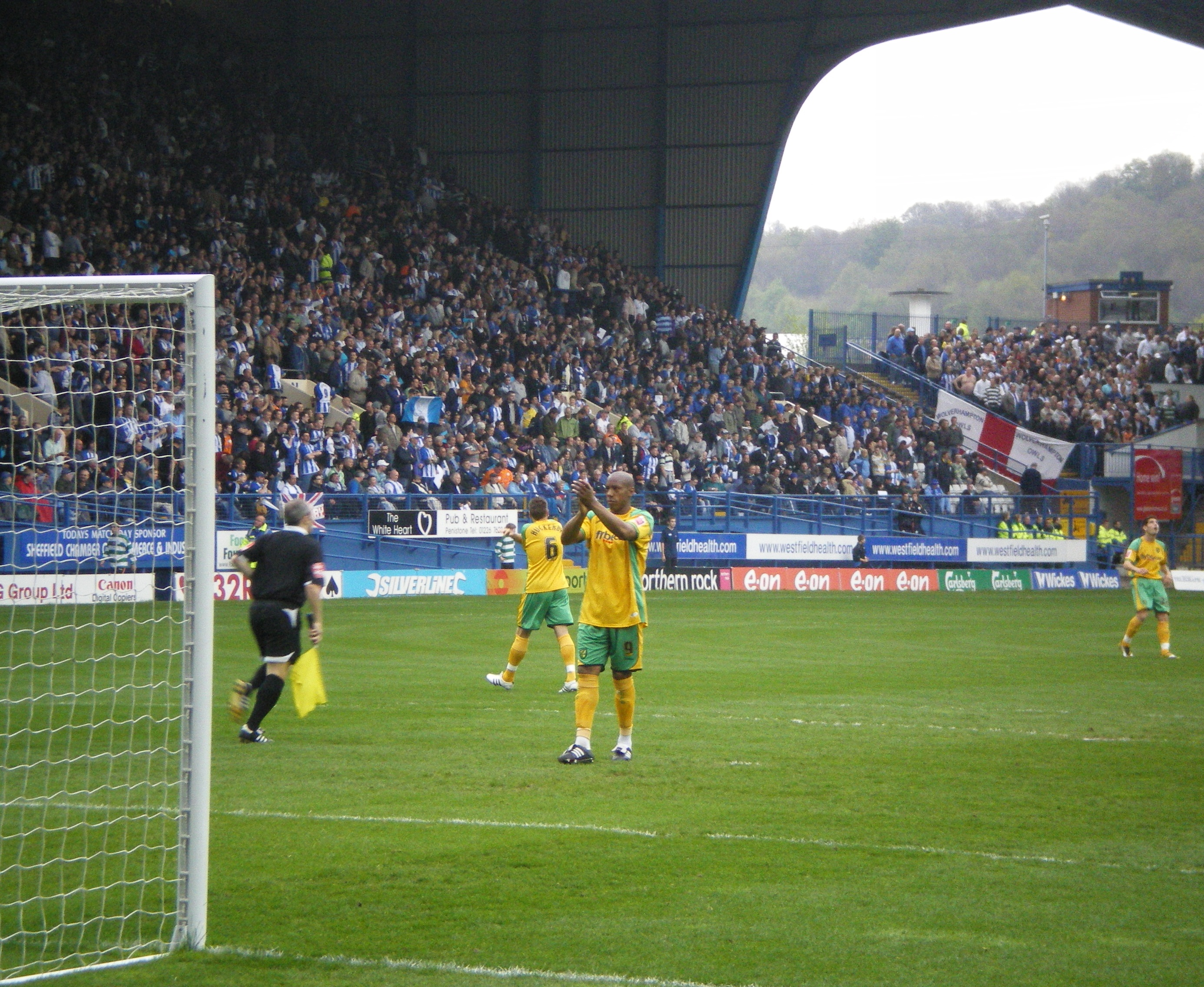
Dion applauds Norwich City fans before kick-off in his final appearance for the Canaries, Hillsborough, 4 May 2008

In the spring of 2008, Dublin was approached by Jimmy Quinn, then manager of Cambridge United (now in the Conference National), about joining his old club for the 2008–09 season. However, the player would not change his mind about retiring. He was voted the club's Player of the Year and awarded the Barry Butler trophy on 26 April 2008 in his final season as a footballer, at his penultimate game, and on his final appearance at Carrow Road. Dublin played his final game on 4 May 2008, featuring in Norwich's 4–1 loss to Sheffield Wednesday in front of 36,208 fans at Hillsborough – the highest Championship attendance that season. When he was taken off in the 66th minute, Dublin received a standing ovation from both sets of supporters and players, and referee Mark Clattenburg.

== International career ==
The 28-year-old earned his first cap for England on 11 February 1998, playing the whole 90 minutes in the 2–0 friendly defeat to Chile at Wembley Stadium. In the run-up to the 1998 FIFA World Cup, Dublin played in the King Hassan II International Cup Tournament in May, starting in the 1–0 win against Morocco, and coming off the bench in 0–0 draw with Belgium, a game England lost on penalties. Despite showing good form and versatility throughout the season, including finishing joint top scorer in the Premier League with 18 goals, Glenn Hoddle included Les Ferdinand ahead of Dublin in his 22-man squad for the tournament in France. On 18 November, he started in the 2–0 friendly win against the Czech Republic at Wembley Stadium. This turned out to be Dublin's last cap for his country. He won four caps for England but did not score any goals.

== Television career ==
Since retiring from football, Dublin has worked in the media as a pundit for Sky Sports. As well as appearing on Ford Super Sunday with Richard Keys, Dublin has commentated on a number of games including the UEFA Champions League games with Martin Tyler. He has also been a member of the panel on BBC Radio 5 Live's Fighting Talk. He has also co-presented 606 on BBC Radio 5 Live, Match of the Day 2 and was also a regular on BBC One's Late Kick Off in the East region. He joined Lucy Alexander and Martin Roberts on Homes Under the Hammer in 2015.

Also for the BBC, he has appeared as a regular pundit for BBC Sport namely on Football Focus, Match of the Day or Final Score. He also occasionally provides co-commentary on live televised FA Cup games.

In August 2021 it was announced that Dublin would be a competitor on BBC's Celebrity MasterChef. He reached the final.

== Personal life ==
Away from football, during his spell with Norwich, he invented a percussion instrument called The Dube, a form of cajón. In 2011, he accompanied Ocean Colour Scene during a gig at the University of East Anglia.

In July 2021, Dublin was appointed as a club director at former club Cambridge United.

== Career statistics ==
=== Club ===
Appearances and goals by club, season and competition
Club	Season	League			National cup (Note: Includes FA Cup)		League cup		Europe		Total	
Club	Season	Division	Apps	Goals	Apps	Goals	Apps	Goals	Apps	Goals	Apps	Goals
Manchester United	1992–93	Premier League	7	1	–		–		–		7	1
Manchester United	1993–94	Premier League	5	1	2	0	1	1	1 (Note: Appearance in UEFA Champions League)	0	9	2
Manchester United	Total		12	2	2	0	1	1	1	0	16	3
Coventry City	1994–95	Premier League	31	13	4	1	3	2	–		32	13
Coventry City	1995–96	Premier League	34	14	3	2	0	0	–		34	14
Coventry City	1996–97	Premier League	34	13	1	0	4	0	–		34	13
Coventry City	1997–98	Premier League	36	18	5	4	2	1	–		41	20
Coventry City	1998–99	Premier League	10	3	0	0	2	1	–		10	3
Coventry City	Total		145	61	13	7	11	4	–		162	72
Aston Villa	1998–99	Premier League	24	11	0	0	0	0	0	0	24	11
Aston Villa	1999–2000	Premier League	26	12	3	1	3	2	3	1	35	16
Aston Villa	2000–01	Premier League	33	8	3	0	1	0	3 (Note: Appearances in UEFA Intertoto Cup)	1	40	9
Aston Villa	2001–02	Premier League	21	4	0	0	2	1	7 (Note: Six appearances and one goal in UEFA Intertoto Cup, one appearance in UEFA Cup)	1	30	6
Aston Villa	2002–03	Premier League	28	10	1	0	4	4	2	0	35	14
Aston Villa	2003–04	Premier League	23	3	0	0	5	0	–		28	3
Aston Villa	Total		155	48	7	1	15	7	15	3	192	59
Millwall (loan)	2001–02	First Division	5	2	0	0	0	0	–		5	2
Leicester City	2004–05	Championship	37	5	5	1	0	0	–		42	6
Leicester City	2005–06	Championship	21	0	0	0	2	0	–		23	0
Leicester City	Total		58	5	5	1	2	0	–		65	6
Celtic	2005–06	Scottish Premier League	11	1	0	0	1	1	–		12	2
Norwich City	2006–07	Championship	33	5	4	2	1	0	–		38	7
Norwich City	2007–08	Championship	37	7	2	1	2	1	–		41	9
Norwich City	Total		70	12	6	3	3	1	–		79	16
Career total			456	127	33	9	32	13	16	3	505	151

=== International ===
Appearances and goals by national team and year
National team	Year	Apps	Goals
England	1998	4	0
Total		4	0

== Honours ==
Cambridge United

- Football League Fourth Division play-offs: 1990
- Football League Third Division: 1990–91

Manchester United

- Premier League: 1992–93
- FA Charity Shield: 1994

Aston Villa

- UEFA Intertoto Cup: 2001
- FA Cup runner-up: 1999–2000

Celtic

- Scottish Premier League: 2005–06
- Scottish League Cup: 2005–06

Individual

- Premier League Golden Boot: 1997–98
- Premier League Player of the Month: January 1998, November 1998
- Coventry City Player of the Year: 1996–97, 1997–98
- Coventry City Hall of Fame
