= Homes Under the Hammer =

British property TV show

- The 2007 logo
- Genre: Factual
- Created by: Melanie Eriksen
- Directed by: Various
- Presented by: Martin Roberts (2003–); Lucy Alexander (2003–2018); Jasmine Birtles (2005); Marc Woodward (2005); Dion Dublin (2015–); Martel Maxwell (2017–); Jacqui Joseph (2021–); Owain Wyn Evans (2024–)
- Composers: Michael Burdett; Richard Cottle
- Country of origin: United Kingdom
- Original language: English
- No. of series: 28
- No. of episodes: 1,000+

Production
- Executive producer: Various
- Producer: Various
- Running time: 30–60 minutes
- Production companies: Lion Television; BBC Scotland

Original release
- Network: BBC One
- Release: 17 November 2003 – present

Homes Under the Hammer is a British factual renovation and auction television series that is screened on BBC One as part of the daytime schedule. The series has been running since 17 November 2003, and is currently presented by Martin Roberts and Martel Maxwell alongside Dion Dublin, Jacqui Joseph and Owain Wyn Evans. Lucy Alexander, who was one of the series' original presenters, departed the series in 2016, though new episodes featuring Alexander were broadcast intermittently until 2018.

The series is the BBC's most successful show among others in the 10am slot, regularly attaining a 30% market share for new episodes, which equates to approximately 1.5 million viewers per episode.

== Format ==
Commercial and industrial property also feature on the programme in addition to residential lots and land plots.

Each episode follows several lots at auction. These often require refurbishment or full development. A presenter and local estate agent provide a valuation of the property, followed by the actual auction and sale price. The buyers discuss potential improvements to the purchased property, with an estimated budget. Following this format for each property, the show returns to show the refurbishments carried out. Another estate agent gives an updated value of the property following the work.

In 2019, the show also started returning to unfinished properties featured in past episodes to give updates on their progress.

== Presenters ==
From the first series in 2003, Lucy Alexander and Martin Roberts presented the show. In 2005, Jasmine Birtles and Marc Woodward also presented a handful of episodes during series three, due to the limited availability of the regular presenters. Retired footballer Dion Dublin joined Alexander and Roberts in 2015 at the beginning of the nineteenth series.

On 1 July 2016, the BBC announced that Alexander had left Homes Under the Hammer after 13 years, though Alexander later clarified that she would continue to appear on the series for "at least another few years", owing to the manner in which the series is filmed.

On 30 March 2017, BBC Scotland's Martel Maxwell was revealed as the new host replacing Alexander during the 21st series of the show and it was announced she would appear on screen from June.

In November 2020, the BBC announced that Money for Nothing presenter Jacqui Joseph and former Ground Force presenter Tommy Walsh would join the presenting team for series 24. This series was broadcast from 2021.

To mark the show's 20th anniversary, a short run of episodes featured a guest co-presenter and a look back at a memorable moment from the archives. The celebrity co-hosts were Laurence Llewelyn-Bowen, Alex Jones, Toyah Willcox, Owain Wyn Evans and Amanda Lovett from The Traitors. Wyn Evans, who first appeared as one of the celebrity guests, started presenting the series proper on 24 October 2024.

The first five episodes of series 28 were also celebrity specials with guest presenters that were this time broadcast over one week in December 2024. Guests this time were Scarlett Moffatt, Zack George, Ian "H" Watkins, Sarah Greene and James Bye. Series 27 resumed on 28 January 2025, with the rest of series 28 starting in May 2025.

Celebrity episodes, aired during the 29th series, feature Dianne Buswell, Harry Aikines-Aryeetey, Francesca Rowan-Plowden from The Traitors, Carol Smillie and Duncan James.

Series	Presenters					
Series	1	2	3	4	5	6
1	Lucy Alexander	Martin Roberts	–	–	–	–
2	Lucy Alexander	Martin Roberts	–	–	–	–
3	Lucy Alexander	Martin Roberts	Jasmine Birtles	Marc Woodward	–	–
4	Lucy Alexander	Martin Roberts	–	–	–	–
5	Lucy Alexander	Martin Roberts	–	–	–	–
6	Lucy Alexander	Martin Roberts	–	–	–	–
7	Lucy Alexander	Martin Roberts	–	–	–	–
8	Lucy Alexander	Martin Roberts	–	–	–	–
9	Lucy Alexander	Martin Roberts	–	–	–	–
10	Lucy Alexander	Martin Roberts	–	–	–	–
11	Lucy Alexander	Martin Roberts	–	–	–	–
12	Lucy Alexander	Martin Roberts	–	–	–	–
13	Lucy Alexander	Martin Roberts	–	–	–	–
14	Lucy Alexander	Martin Roberts	–	–	–	–
15	Lucy Alexander	Martin Roberts	–	–	–	–
16	Lucy Alexander	Martin Roberts	–	–	–	–
17	Lucy Alexander	Martin Roberts	–	–	–	–
18	Lucy Alexander	Martin Roberts	–	–	–	–
19	Lucy Alexander	Martin Roberts	Dion Dublin	–	–	–
20	Lucy Alexander	Martin Roberts	Dion Dublin	–	–	–
21	Lucy Alexander	Martin Roberts	Dion Dublin	Jacqui Joseph	Tommy Walsh	–
22	Martin Roberts	Martel Maxwell	Dion Dublin	Jacqui Joseph	Tommy Walsh	–
23	Martin Roberts	Martel Maxwell	Dion Dublin	Jacqui Joseph	Tommy Walsh	–
24	Martin Roberts	Martel Maxwell	Dion Dublin	Jacqui Joseph	Tommy Walsh	–
25	Martin Roberts	Martel Maxwell	Dion Dublin	Jacqui Joseph	Tommy Walsh	Owain Wyn Evans
26	Martin Roberts	Martel Maxwell	Dion Dublin	Jacqui Joseph	Tommy Walsh	Owain Wyn Evans
27	Martin Roberts	Martel Maxwell	Dion Dublin	Jacqui Joseph	Tommy Walsh	Owain Wyn Evans

== Music ==
During the stages of viewing the property, or whilst interviewing the buyer, licensed music is normally played which is related to the property, or person buying.

London-based composers Michael Burdett and Richard Cottle created the theme tune, musical beds and stings.

For the final chords of the theme tune Burdett and Cottle used the 32ft open wood on the organ at the Welsh Presbyterian Church Charing Cross.

== Transmissions ==
=== Regular ===
Series	Start date	End date	Episodes
1	17 November 2003	12 December 2003	20
2	8 November 2004	18 March 2005	45
3	6 June 2005	2 August 2005	25
4	7 November 2005	29 March 2006	40
5	5 June 2006	20 November 2006	30
6	8 January 2007	16 February 2007	20
7	30 April 2007	29 June 2007	30
8	17 September 2007	23 November 2007	20
9	7 January 2008	22 February 2008	20
10	25 February 2008	20 June 2008	30
11	30 June 2008	12 September 2008	20
12	24 November 2008	2 February 2009	29
13	9 February 2009	1 March 2010	85
14	12 April 2010	4 February 2011	80
15	7 March 2011	2 March 2012	100
16	9 April 2012	13 February 2013	78
17	11 March 2013	31 March 2014	80
18	15 April 2014	30 March 2015	80
19	13 April 2015	29 March 2016	80
20	12 April 2016	23 March 2017	80
21	4 April 2017	22 March 2018	80
22	17 April 2018	26 February 2019	80
23	2 April 2019	24 March 2020	80
24	7 April 2020	4 February 2022	80
25	22 February 2022	19 January 2023	80
26	20 January 2023	27 February 2024	80
27	2 April 2024	1 May 2025	79
28	6 May 2025	20 May 2026	51
29	18 August 2026	TBC	TBC

=== Celebrity ===
Series	Start date	End date	Episodes
1	9 December 2024	13 December 2024	5
