= 2007–08 Norwich City F.C. season =

Norwich City
2007–08 season
- Chairman: Roger Munby
- Manager: Peter Grant (until 9 October); Glenn Roeder (from 30 October to 4 May)
- Stadium: Carrow Road
- Championship: 17th
- FA Cup: Third round
- League Cup: Third round
- Top goalscorer: League: Jamie Cureton (14); All: Jamie Cureton (15)
- Highest home attendance: 25,497 (vs. Queens Park Rangers, 26 April)
- Lowest home attendance: 23,176 (vs. Scunthorpe United, 2 October)
- Average home league attendance: 24,527
Home colours	Away colours	Third colours

The 2007–08 season was Norwich City's third consecutive year in the Football League Championship. This article shows statistics and lists all matches that Norwich City played in the season.

== Season summary ==
Norwich had a busy summer with Peter Grant bringing in 9 players, which included goalkeeper David Marshall and former players Jamie Cureton and Darel Russell making returns to Carrow Road. 10 players departed Norwich, most notably Dickson Etuhu and Robert Earnshaw, while Darren Huckerby caused controversy by criticizing the club for selling their best players.

Norwich started off with a goalless draw away at Preston and a 2–1 win over Southampton, but after this Norwich endured a horrendous run of form, winning 1 league game in 8. After a 1–0 away defeat to QPR, Grant and City parted company by mutual consent.

Jim Duffy took over as caretaker boss, but lost his 3 games in charge.

On 30 October, Glenn Roeder was appointed as Grant's successor with the team bottom of the table. His first game was the East Anglian Derby against Ipswich, a 2–2 draw with Norwich coming back from 2–0 down. Norwich lost their next 2 games, including a dreadful 3–0 defeat away at Plymouth Argyle, and were 8 points away from safety. After that defeat Roeder brought in Matty Pattison, Mo Camara and Ched Evans on loan to add to the loan signing of Martin Taylor, who had been signed before the game against Ipswich (Pattison's loan move was made permanent in January). Norwich's form improved greatly, with only one defeat in eleven league games. After a 3–1 win over Barnsley on 12 January Norwich were in 18th position, four points clear of the relegation zone. Roeder began an overhaul of the squad during the January transfer window, selling Chris Brown to Preston and releasing David Strihavka, Julien Brellier and Ian Murray, all of whom had been signed by Grant and who had not figured in the first team since the defeat at Plymouth.

== Results ==
Win Draw Loss

=== Pre-season friendlies ===
Round	1	2	3	4	5	6	7
Result	1–2	12–0	4–0	2–0	1–2	1–2	1–0

15 July 2007	Exeter City	2–1	Norwich City	Exeter, Devon
15:00 BST	Mackie 15'; Stansfield 16'	Report	Chadwick 36'	Stadium: St James Park; Attendance: Unknown; Referee: Unknown

17 July 2007	Lowestoft Town	0–12	Norwich City	Lowestoft, Suffolk
19:45 BST		Report	Martin 15', 37', 43', 61'; Brown 18'; Safri 22'; Eagle 36'; Spillane 49'; Chadwick 54'; Rossi Jarvis 68'; Renton 69', 76'	Stadium: Crown Meadow; Attendance: Unknown; Referee: Unknown

19 July 2007	King's Lynn	0–4	Norwich City	King's Lynn, Norfolk
19:45 BST		Report	Drury 4'; Cureton 82' (pen.), 85'; Lathrope 87'	Stadium: The Walks; Attendance: 1,366; Referee: Unknown

23 July 2007	AGOVV Apeldoorn (Netherlands)	0–2	Norwich City	Harderwijk, Netherlands
15:00 BST		Report	Brown 76'; Cureton 84'	Stadium: Sportpark De Strokel; Attendance: Unknown; Referee: Unknown

23 July 2007	FC Zwolle (Netherlands)	2–1	Norwich City	Harderwijk, Netherlands
19:45 BST	Jansen 45'; Moisander 69'	Report	Střihavka 8'	Stadium: Sportpark De Strokel; Attendance: Unknown; Referee: Unknown

31 July 2007	Norwich City	1–2	West Ham United	Norwich, Norfolk
19:45 BST	Brown 57'	Report	Spector 28'; Ashton 44'	Stadium: Carrow Road; Attendance: 22,751; Referee: Mike Thorpe

3 August 2007	Norwich City	1–0	(Netherlands) Vitesse Arnhem	Norwich, Norfolk
19:45 BST	Drury 60'	Report		Stadium: Carrow Road; Attendance: Unknown; Referee: Andre Marriner

=== League ===
Round	1	2	3	4	5	6	7	8	9	10	11	12	13	14	15	16	17	18	19	20	21	22	23
Result	0–0	2–1	1–2	1–2	1–0	0–2	0–2	0–1	0–0	0–1	1–3	1–2	0–2	2–2	1–3	0–3	2–0	3–1	1–2	2–1	1–0	1–1	1–0
Position	15	9	15	20	13	17	20	21	22	22	23	23	24	24	24	24	24	24	24	23	21	21	18

Round	24	25	26	27	28	29	30	31	32	33	34	35	36	37	38	39	40	41	42	43	44	45	46
Result	1–1	1–1	1–1	3–1	0–0	1–0	1–0	2–1	1–1	0–4	1–0	1–2	1–1	0–1	0–1	0–2	5–1	1–2	2–0	1–2	1–2	3–0	1–4
Position	20	20	20	18	18	16	13	13	13	13	12	13	13	13	17	18	17	17	16	16	18	16	17

==== August ====
11 August 2007	Preston North End	0–0	Norwich City	Preston, Lancashire
15:00 BST		Report		Stadium: Deepdale; Attendance: 13,408; Referee: Paul Taylor

18 August 2007	Norwich City	2–1	Southampton	Norwich, Norfolk
15:00 BST	Cureton 61', 71'	Report	Jones 37'	Stadium: Carrow Road; Attendance: 24,004; Referee: Clive Oliver

25 August 2007	Hull City	2–1	Norwich City	Kingston upon Hull, East Riding of Yorkshire
15:00 BST	Windass 49'; Garcia 77'	Report	Dublin 71'	Stadium: KC Stadium; Attendance: 15,939; Referee: Nigel Miller

==== September ====
1 September 2007	Norwich City	1–2	Cardiff City	Norwich, Norfolk
15:00 BST	Lappin 12'	Report	Whittingham 64'; Johnson 84'	Stadium: Carrow Road; Attendance: 24,292; Referee: Clive Penton

15 September 2007	Norwich City	1–0	Crystal Palace	Norwich, Norfolk
15:00 BST	Střihavka 75'	Report		Stadium: Carrow Road; Attendance: 24,228; Referee: Lee Probert

18 September 2007	Charlton Athletic	2–0	Norwich City	Charlton, London
19:45 BST	Reid 85' (pen.), 88' (pen.)	Report	Dublin (red card) 90'	Stadium: The Valley; Attendance: 21,543; Referee: Jarnail Singh

22 September 2007	Wolverhampton Wanderers	2–0	Norwich City	Wolverhampton, West Midlands
15:00 BST	Foley 23'; Keogh 35'	Report	Shackell (red card) 63'; Brellier (yellow card) 75' (yellow-red card) 75'	Stadium: Molineux; Attendance: 22,564; Referee: Steve Bennett

29 September 2007	Norwich City	0–1	Sheffield Wednesday	Norwich, Norfolk
17:20 BST		Report	Small 76'	Stadium: Carrow Road; Attendance: 23,293; Referee: Lee Probert

==== October ====
2 October 2007	Norwich City	0–0	Scunthorpe United	Norwich, Norfolk
19:45 BST		Report		Stadium: Carrow Road; Attendance: 23,176; Referee: Kevin Friend

8 October 2007	Queens Park Rangers	1–0	Norwich City	Shepherd's Bush, London
19:45 BST	Rowlands 67' (pen.)	Report		Stadium: Loftus Road; Attendance: 10,514; Referee: Andy Penn

20 October 2007	Norwich City	1–3	Bristol City	Norwich, Norfolk
15:00 BST	Huckerby 82'	Report	McIndoe 48'; Murray 85'; Trundle 90'	Stadium: Carrow Road; Attendance: 24,125; Referee: Anthony Bates

23 October 2007	Burnley	2–1	Norwich City	Burnley, Lancashire
19:45 BST	Blake 1'; Gray 4' (pen.)	Report	Brown 68'	Stadium: Turf Moor; Attendance: 10,133; Referee: Mike Jones

27 October 2007	West Bromwich Albion	2–0	Norwich City	West Bromwich, West Midlands
15:00 BST	Miller 16'; Phillips 51'	Report		Stadium: The Hawthorns; Attendance: 20,247; Referee: Phil Joslin

==== November ====
4 November 2007	Norwich City	2–2	Ipswich Town	Norwich, Norfolk
12:45 GMT	Garvan 56' (o.g.); Cureton 67'; Huckerby (red card) 90'	Report	Lee 27'; Couñago 41'	Stadium: Carrow Road; Attendance: 25,461; Referee: Rob Styles

6 November 2007	Norwich City	1–3	Watford	Norwich, Norfolk
19:45 GMT	Croft 65'	Report	Henderson 36'; Marshall 43' (o.g.); King 88'	Stadium: Carrow Road; Attendance: 24,192; Referee: Clive Penton

10 November 2007	Plymouth Argyle	3–0	Norwich City	Plymouth, Devon
15:00 GMT	Martin 26'; Connolly 47'; Norris 49'	Report		Stadium: Home Park; Attendance: 11,222; Referee: Darren Drysdale

24 November 2007	Norwich City	2–0	Coventry City	Norwich, Norfolk
15:00 GMT	Chadwick 34'; Cureton 77'	Report		Stadium: Carrow Road; Attendance: 24,590; Referee: Andy D'Urso

27 November 2007	Blackpool	1–3	Norwich City	Blackpool, Lancashire
19:45 GMT	Ślusarski 38'	Report	Dublin 30', 90'; Taylor 74'	Stadium: Bloomfield Road; Attendance: 7,759; Referee: Mark Haywood

==== December ====
1 December 2007	Stoke City	2–1	Norwich City	Stoke-on-Trent, Staffordshire
15:00 GMT	Cort 38'; Cresswell 89'	Report	Huckerby 5'	Stadium: Britannia Stadium; Attendance: 19,285; Referee: Lee Probert

4 December 2007	Norwich City	2–1	Plymouth Argyle	Norwich, Norfolk
19:45 GMT	Evans 2'; Huckerby 87' (pen.)	Report	Timár 89'	Stadium: Carrow Road; Attendance: 25,434; Referee: Paul Taylor

8 December 2007	Norwich City	1–0	Sheffield United	Norwich, Norfolk
15:00 GMT	Evans 10'	Report		Stadium: Carrow Road; Attendance: 24,493; Referee: Darren Deadman

15 December 2007	Colchester United	1–1	Norwich City	Colchester, Essex
17:20 GMT	McLeod 78'	Report	Granville 90' (o.g.)	Stadium: Layer Road; Attendance: 5,560; Referee: Mike Jones

22 December 2007	Scunthorpe United	0–1	Norwich City	Scunthorpe, North Lincolnshire
15:00 GMT		Report	Cureton 78'	Stadium: Glanford Park; Attendance: 6,648; Referee: Graham Laws

26 December 2007	Norwich City	1–1	Charlton Athletic	Norwich, Norfolk
15:00 GMT	Russell 73'	Report	Zheng 21'; Sodje (red card) 30'	Stadium: Carrow Road; Attendance: 25,327; Referee: Mick Russell

29 December 2007	Norwich City	1–1	Wolverhampton Wanderers	Norwich, Norfolk
15:00 GMT	Cureton 75'	Report	Keogh 52'	Stadium: Carrow Road; Attendance: 24,300; Referee: Lee Probert

==== January ====
1 January 2008	Crystal Palace	1–1	Norwich City	South Norwood, London
15:00 GMT	Morrison 50'	Report	Russell 9'	Stadium: Selhurst Park; Attendance: 17,199; Referee: Mike Thorpe

12 January 2008	Barnsley	1–3	Norwich City	Barnsley, South Yorkshire
15:00 GMT	Devaney 18'	Report	Evans 48'; Fotheringham 70'; Dublin 74'	Stadium: Oakwell; Attendance: 10,117; Referee: Paul Armstrong

19 January 2008	Norwich City	0–0	Leicester City	Norwich, Norfolk
15:00 GMT		Report		Stadium: Carrow Road; Attendance: 25,462; Referee: Anthony Bates

29 January 2008	Southampton	0–1	Norwich City	Southampton, Hampshire
19:45 GMT		Report	Evans 45'	Stadium: St Mary's Stadium; Attendance: 18,004; Referee: Andy Penn

==== February ====
2 February 2008	Norwich City	1–0	Preston North End	Norwich, Norfolk
15:00 GMT	Russell 90'	Report		Stadium: Carrow Road; Attendance: 24,092; Referee: Jarnail Singh

9 February 2008	Cardiff City	1–2	Norwich City	Cardiff, Wales
12:00 GMT	Rae 45'	Report	Evans 15', 88'	Stadium: Ninian Park; Attendance: 11,937; Referee: Richard Beeby

12 February 2008	Norwich City	1–1	Hull City	Norwich, Norfolk
19:45 GMT	Dublin 19'	Report	Campbell 53'	Stadium: Carrow Road; Attendance: 25,259; Referee: Andy Hall

16 February 2008	Leicester City	4–0	Norwich City	Leicester, Leicestershire
15:00 GMT	Hume 22'; Howard 57'; Campbell 77'; Clemence 82'	Report	Russell (red card) 60'	Stadium: Walkers Stadium; Attendance: 25,854; Referee: Clive Oliver

23 February 2008	Norwich City	1–0	Barnsley	Norwich, Norfolk
15:00 GMT	Cureton 26'	Report		Stadium: Carrow Road; Attendance: 24,197; Referee: Grant Hegley

==== March ====
1 March 2008	Norwich City	1–2	Blackpool	Norwich, Norfolk
15:00 GMT	Cureton 65' (pen.)	Report	McPhee 15', 39'	Stadium: Carrow Road; Attendance: 24,531; Referee: Rob Shoebridge

4 March 2008	Watford	1–1	Norwich City	Watford, Hertfordshire
19:45 GMT	Shittu 11'	Report	Cureton 81'	Stadium: Vicarage Road; Attendance: 16,537; Referee: Keith Stroud

8 March 2008	Coventry City	1–0	Norwich City	Coventry, West Midlands
15:00 GMT	Tabb 6'	Report	Doherty (yellow card) 45' (yellow-red card) 54'; Russell (yellow card) 58' (yellow-red card) 85'	Stadium: Vicarage Road; Attendance: 18,108; Referee: Paul Taylor

11 March 2008	Norwich City	0–1	Stoke City	Norwich, Norfolk
19:45 GMT		Report	Sidibe 58'	Stadium: Carrow Road; Attendance: 23,471; Referee: Andy Woolmer

15 March 2008	Sheffield United	2–0	Norwich City	Sheffield, South Yorkshire
15:00 GMT	Sharp 52'; Kilgallon 56'	Report		Stadium: Bramall Lane; Attendance: 25,536; Referee: Michael Oliver

22 March 2008	Norwich City	5–1	Colchester United	Norwich, Norfolk
15:00 GMT	Otsemobor 6'; Cureton 36', 53' (pen.), 87'; Dublin 90'	Report	Lisbie 41'	Stadium: Carrow Road; Attendance: 25,215; Referee: Mark Haywood

29 March 2008	Bristol City	2–1	Norwich City	Bristol
15:00 GMT	Adebola 41'; Brooker 90'	Report	Huckerby 70'	Stadium: Ashton Gate; Attendance: 17,511; Referee: Andy D'Urso

==== April ====
5 April 2008	Norwich City	2–0	Burnley	Norwich, Norfolk
15:00 BST	Dublin 2'; Evans 90'	Report		Stadium: Carrow Road; Attendance: 24,049; Referee: Russell Booth

13 April 2008	Ipswich Town	2–1	Norwich City	Ipswich, Suffolk
12:00 BST	Pearce 13' (o.g.); Haynes 40'	Report	Evans 4'	Stadium: Portman Road; Attendance: 29,656; Referee: Mike Jones

19 April 2008	Norwich City	1–2	West Bromwich Albion	Norwich, Norfolk
15:00 BST	Evans 73' (pen.)	Report	Koren 2'; Gera 71'	Stadium: Carrow Road; Attendance: 25,442; Referee: Iain Williamson

26 April 2008	Norwich City	3–0	Queens Park Rangers	Norwich, Norfolk
15:00 BST	Evans 7'; Fotheringham 56'; Russell 83'	Report	Stewart (red card) 5'	Stadium: Carrow Road; Attendance: 25,497; Referee: Phil Joslin

==== May ====
4 May 2008	Sheffield Wednesday	4–1	Norwich City	Sheffield, South Yorkshire
14:00 BST	Burton 23' (pen.), 76'; Sahar 53'; Clarke 87'	Report	Huckerby 9'	Stadium: Hillsborough Stadium; Attendance: 36,208; Referee: Mark Clattenburg

=== FA Cup ===
Round	3	3(R)
Result	1–1	1–2

5 January 2008 Round 3	Norwich City	1–1	Bury	Norwich, Norfolk
15:00 GMT	Doherty 80'	Report	Bishop 71'	Stadium: Carrow Road; Attendance: 19,815; Referee: Steve Bratt

15 January 2008 Round 3 (replay)	Bury	2–1	Norwich City	Bury, Greater Manchester
19:45 GMT	Futcher 18'; Bishop 61'	Report	Dublin 86'	Stadium: Gigg Lane; Attendance: 4,146; Referee: Colin Webster

=== League Cup ===
Round	1	2	3
Result	5–2	1–1	0–1

14 August 2007 Round 1	Norwich City	5–2	Barnet	Norwich, Norfolk
19:45 BST	Cureton 3', 16'; Lappin 21'; Fotheringham 25'; Russell 31'	Report	Puncheon 66'; Birchall 74'; Bishop (red card) 86'	Stadium: Carrow Road; Attendance: 13,971; Referee: Darren Deadman

28 August 2007 Round 2	Rochdale	1–1 (AET) (3–4 p)	Norwich City	Rochdale, Greater Manchester
19:45 BST	Murray 9'	Report	Dublin 49'	Stadium: Spotland Stadium; Attendance: 2,990; Referee: Colin Webster
	Penalties
	Kennedy (penalty scored); Le Fondre (penalty scored); Prendergast (penalty missed); Dagnall (penalty scored); Jones (penalty missed)		(penalty scored) Brown; (penalty scored) Lappin; (penalty scored) Martin; (penalty scored) Huckerby

25 September 2007 Round 3	Manchester City	1–0	Norwich City	Bradford, Greater Manchester
19:45 BST	Samaras 90'	Report		Stadium: City of Manchester Stadium; Attendance: 20,938; Referee: Andre Marriner

== Transfers ==
=== Transfers in ===
Date from	Name	From	Fee	Ref.
1 July 2007	Jon Otsemobor	Crewe Alexandra	Free	
1 July 2007	Matthew Gilks	Rochdale	Free	
1 July 2007	Jamie Cureton	Colchester United	Undisclosed	
3 July 2007	Julien Brellier	Hearts	Free	
4 July 2007	David Marshall	Celtic	Undisclosed	
11 July 2007	David Střihavka	Baník Ostrava	Undisclosed	
30 July 2007	Darel Russell	Stoke City	£600,000	
24 August 2007	Ian Murray	Rangers	Free	
4 January 2008	Matty Pattison	Newcastle United	Undisclosed	
19 February 2008	Juan Velasco	—	Free	

=== Loans in ===
Date from	Name	From	Date until	Ref.
19 July 2007	Jimmy Smith	Chelsea	31 December 2008	
12 October 2007	John Hartson	West Bromwich Albion	8 November 2007	
1 November 2007	Martin Taylor	Birmingham City	1 December 2007	
15 November 2007	Matty Pattison	Newcastle United	1 January 2007	
20 November 2007	Mo Camara	Derby County	30 June 2008	
22 November 2007	Ched Evans	Manchester City	1 January 2008	
4 January 2008	Ryan Bertrand	Chelsea	30 June 2008	
31 January 2008	James Henry	Reading	17 March 2008	
31 January 2008	Kieran Gibbs	Arsenal	29 April 2008	
31 January 2008	Matthew Bates	Middlesbrough	30 April 2008	
31 January 2008	Alex Pearce	Reading	30 June 2008	
19 March 2008	Maceo Rigters	Blackburn Rovers	1 April 2008	

=== Transfers out ===
Date	Name	To	Fee	Ref.
4 May 2007	Ian Henderson	Northampton Town	Released	
4 May 2007	Peter Thorne	Bradford City	Released	
4 May 2007	Andrew Fisk	King's Lynn	Released	
4 May 2007	Paul McVeigh	Luton Town	Released	
4 May 2007	Matthieu Louis-Jean		Released	
1 July 2007	Robert Earnshaw	Derby County	£3.5 million	
1 July 2007	Jürgen Colin	Ajax	£67,500	
17 July 2007	Dickson Etuhu	Sunderland	£1.5 million	
2 August 2007	Youssef Safri	Southampton	Undisclosed	
9 August 2007	Andrew Hughes	Leeds United	Undisclosed	
31 December 2007	Paul Gallacher	Dunfermline Athletic	Released	
8 January 2008	Joe Lewis	Peterborough United	£400,000	
10 January 2008	Chris Brown	Preston North End	£400,000	
18 January 2008	Ian Murray	Hibernian	Free	
11 January 2008	David Střihavka		Released	
11 January 2008	Julien Brellier	FC Sion	Released	

=== Loans out ===
Date from	Name	To	Date until	Ref.
8 August 2007	Joe Lewis	Morecambe	31 December 2007	
20 August 2007	Paul Gallacher	Dunfermline Athletic	31 December 2007	
24 August 2007	Ryan Jarvis	Kilmarnock	January 2008	
12 September 2007	Bally Smart	Milton Keynes Dons	December 2007	
31 January 2008	Simon Lappin	Motherwell	30 June 2008	
31 January 2008	Ryan Jarvis	Notts County	30 June 2008	

== Players ==
=== First team squad ===
Squad at end of season

Note: Flags indicate national team as defined under FIFA eligibility rules; some limited exceptions apply. Players may hold more than one non-FIFA nationality.

No.	Pos.	Nation	Player
1	GK	SCO	David Marshall
2	DF	ENG	Jon Otsemobor
3	DF	ENG	Adam Drury
4	DF	ENG	Jason Shackell
6	FW	ENG	Darren Huckerby
7	MF	ENG	Lee Croft
8	FW	NED	Maceo Rigters (on loan from Blackburn Rovers)
9	FW	ENG	Dion Dublin
10	FW	ENG	Jamie Cureton
11	MF	ENG	Luke Chadwick
12	GK	ENG	Matthew Gilks
13	GK	ENG	Declan Rudd
14	DF	ESP	Juan Velasco
15	DF	SCO	Alex Pearce (Note: Pearce was born in Wallingford, England, but also qualified to represent Scotland and the Republic of Ireland internationally through his parents and represented Scotland at U-19 and U-21 level before making his international debut for the Republic of Ireland in September 2012.) (on loan from Reading)
16	MF	SCO	Mark Fotheringham (captain)
17	DF	GUI	Mo Camara (on loan from Derby County)
20	MF	ENG	Darel Russell

No.	Pos.	Nation	Player
21	DF	ENG	Ryan Bertrand (on loan from Chelsea)
24	MF	RSA	Matty Pattison
25	DF	ENG	Rossi Jarvis
26	MF	ENG	Robert Eagle
27	DF	IRL	Gary Doherty
28	MF	IRL	Michael Spillane (Note: Spillane was born in Cambridge, England, but also qualified to represent the Republic of Ireland internationally and represented them at U-17, U-18, U-19 and U-21 level.)
29	DF	ENG	Matthew Halliday
30	MF	ENG	Korey Smith
31	DF	SCO	Andrew Cave-Brown (Note: Cave-Brown was born in Gravesend, England, but also qualified to represent Scotland internationally and represented them at U-19 and U-20 level.)
32	FW	WAL	Ched Evans (on loan from Manchester City)
33	FW	SCO	Kris Renton
34	GK	ENG	Steven Arnold
35	FW	ENG	Chris Martin (Note: Martin was born in Beccles, England, and represented them at U-19 level, but also qualified to represent Scotland internationally through his father and would make his international debut for Scotland in 2014.)
36	MF	RSA	Bally Smart
37	MF	ENG	Patrick Bexfield
38	MF	ENG	Damon Lathrope
39	FW	ENG	Luke Daley

=== Left club during season ===
Note: Flags indicate national team as defined under FIFA eligibility rules; some limited exceptions apply. Players may hold more than one non-FIFA nationality.

No.	Pos.	Nation	Player
5	DF	ENG	Martin Taylor (on loan from Birmingham City)
8	MF	FRA	Julien Brellier (released)
14	FW	ENG	Chris Brown (to Preston North End)
15	MF	SCO	Ian Murray (to Hibernian)
17	FW	WAL	John Hartson (on loan from West Bromwich Albion)
18	MF	ENG	Jimmy Smith (on loan from Chelsea)
18	DF	ENG	Kieran Gibbs (on loan from Arsenal)

No.	Pos.	Nation	Player
19	MF	SCO	Simon Lappin (on loan to Motherwell)
21	GK	SCO	Paul Gallacher (to Dunfermline Athletic)
22	FW	CZE	David Střihavka (released)
22	DF	ENG	Matthew Bates (on loan from Middlesbrough)
23	FW	ENG	Ryan Jarvis (on loan to Notts County)
30	GK	ENG	Joe Lewis (to Peterborough United)
30	MF	ENG	James Henry (on loan from Reading)

== Board and staff members ==
=== Board members ===
Position	Name	Nationality
Chairman	Roger Munby	England
Joint majority shareholder	Delia Smith	England
Joint majority shareholder	Michael Wynn-Jones	Wales
Director	Andrew Turner	England
Director	Sharon Turner	England
Director	Michael Foulger	England
Chief executive	Neil Doncaster	England

=== Coaching staff ===
Position	Staff
Manager	(England) Glen Roeder
Assistant manager	(England) Lee Clark
First team coach	(England) Paul Stephenson
Goalkeeping coach	(Northern Ireland) Tommy Wright
Fitness coach	(Republic of Ireland) Dave Carolan
Youth coach	(England) Ricky Martin
Physiotherapist	(England) Neal Reynolds
Sports science	(Republic of Ireland) Dave Carolan
Club liaison	(Scotland) Bryan Gunn
Club doctor	(England) Dr Peter Harvey
Chief scout	(Scotland) Bryan Gunn

Last updated: 26 June 2008
Source: Norwich FC

== Final league table ==
Pos	Team	Pld	W	D	L	GF	GA	GD	Pts
15	Preston North End	46	15	11	20	50	56	−6	56
16	Sheffield Wednesday	46	14	13	19	54	55	−1	55
17	Norwich City	46	15	10	21	49	59	−10	55
18	Barnsley	46	14	13	19	52	65	−13	55
19	Blackpool	46	12	18	16	59	64	−5	54

Updated to match(es) played on 4 May 2008. Source: The Football League
Rules for classification: 1) points; 2) goal difference; 3) number of goals scored.
