= Kgaogelo =

Kgaogelo is a South African given name for both males and females, it is of Sepedi (Northern Sotho) origin, which is one of South Africa's official languages.

The name means "mercy" and the "Kga" is pronounced how the Arabs pronounce "Kha", i.e. in Khalid, so it's pronounced Khaō-ge-lo.

The following are notable people in South Africa:

- Kegs Chauke (born Kgaogelo Chauke in 2003), English and South African football midfielder
- Master KG (born Kgaogelo Moagi in 1996), South African musician and record producer
- Kgaogelo Sekgota (born 1997), South African football winger
