= Makotopong =

Village in Limpopo

Coordinates: 23°48′49″S 29°38′31″E

Makotopong is a village located 30 km outside the town of Polokwane within the province of Limpopo in South Africa. Makotopong falls under the Polokwane Local Municipality.

The total population in the area was 8,163 in 2011. The majority of the people speak Sepedi and Xitsonga. The Turfloop campus of the University of Limpopo is located in Mankweng The distance between Makotopong and Pretoria is 290 km.

== Demographics ==
The South African census showed the population of Makotopong as 8,163 with 2,159 households in the 2011 census.

| Group | Percentage |
|---|---|
| Black African | 99,6% |
| Coloured | 0,0% |
| Indian/Asian | 0,1% |
| White | 0,0% |
| Other | 0,1% |

== Schools ==
Mananga Primary School, Makotopong Junior High School, Phomolong Secondary School and Mothimako High School are both public schools in Makototopong Village

== Churches ==
Zion Christian Church in Moria is 15 km away from Makotopong. The Dominant churches are Evangelical Lutheran Church and Zion Christian Church. There is also Divine Life Ministries Christian Church located in Setaseng Section 2KM from Mothimako Highschool, Assemblies of God located in Phomolong Section next to Phomolong cemetery and Pentecostal Holiness Church located approximately 900M from Phomolong cemetery.

== Sport ==
Polokwane United F.C. have their base in Makotopong. The football club opened Polokwane United Training Centre in 2022 built by club founder Bally Smart. The Training Centre is also where the Academy is located.

== Notable people ==
- Dr Themba Sono, Was President of the South African Student Organisation (SASO) from 1971 until July 1972
- Professor Ephaim Thibedi Mokgokong, Former president of the Health Professions Council of South Africa (HPCSA)
- Dr Olive Shisana, Pioneer in HIV and AIDS Research
- Kgosi Phambane was the King of the village, his predecessor was Kgosi Phambane II.
