= Martin Roberts (presenter) =

Television presenter and property expert

- Born: Martin Leyland Roberts; 20 July 1963 (age 63); Warrington, Cheshire, England
- Years active: 1984–present
- Television: Homes Under the Hammer
- Spouse: Kirsty Roberts
- Children: 2

Martin Leyland Roberts (born 20 July 1963) is an English television presenter, property expert, investor, entrepreneur and author. He presents the BBC One property auction series Homes Under the Hammer with co-presenters Martel Maxwell (since 2017) and Dion Dublin, although his co-presenter for many years was Lucy Alexander. He also hosts the Talkradio show Home Rule with Martin Roberts, on which he chats about property.

== Early life and career ==
Born in Warrington, Cheshire, Roberts was brought up in Stockton Heath, a suburb of Warrington. He began his career in the late 1980s at BBC Radio Manchester. His grandfather was a well known organist at various Warrington chapels.

Roberts attended Appleton Hall Grammar School, then studied electronic engineering at the University of Bradford 1983–86. He was a DJ on Ramair, the university's radio station. Roberts has worked as a property developer since the early 1990s and has contributed to several publications, both on the subject of property development and travel.

Since then, he has presented several other programmes, including Put Your Money Where Your Mouth Is and How to Survive the Property Crisis, both for the BBC as well as ITV's travel programme Wish You Were Here...? Roberts is most famous for being BBC's UK and Overseas Property expert, writing and presenting Homes Under the Hammer, having done so since the programme began in 2003 to the present day, as well as making regular appearances on BBC Breakfast, BBC News 24 and The One Show.

Roberts has also made appearances on Ready Steady Cook with Homes Under the Hammer co-presenter, Lucy Alexander. He has been a celebrity contestant on BBC gameshows Hole in the Wall and Pointless, raising money for charity. In July 2010, Roberts entered the BBC television programme Celebrity MasterChef, and was the first eliminated. In November 2016, he was a contestant on I'm a Celebrity...Get Me Out of Here!. He was eliminated after spending 15 days in camp, coming in sixth place.

Roberts has presented radio throughout his career as the BBC's UK and Overseas Property expert, contributing to many shows on BBC radios 2, 4 and 5 Live. He is a regular guest presenter on The Jeremy Vine Show, which airs on BBC Radio 2, and Moneybox, which airs on BBC Radio 4. In March 2016, he began hosting a weekly property radio show for Talk Radio named Gazumped (Saturday 11 am – 1 pm and Sunday 5 – 7 pm). The show was later renamed Home Rule, and Sunday editions are no longer live, but recorded, broadcast from 6 am to 8 am.

In September 2012, Roberts publicly criticised proposed government changes to the planning laws of England that would double the size of extensions that do not need approval.

Roberts has written many books, including Teach Yourself Making Money from Property and The Property Auction Guide.

He is the author of The Villes series of books for children. One of the books in the series, Sadsville, was written in partnership with the NSPCC to encourage children to contact ChildLine if they need someone to talk to about any problems. To promote this book, Roberts went to his local primary school, which his children attended.

He has also contributed to travelling books, including Great Festivals of the World, The Travellers' Handbook and Intrepid Africa.

== Personal life ==
For many years, Roberts lived in Paulton near Bath, Somerset, and is married with two children. In 2017, he opened his village's annual "Party in the Park".

In February 2023 Roberts bought the Hendrewen Hotel in Blaencwm at the top of the Rhondda Fawr. He intended to spend at least half a million pounds of his own money on the project. He had already bought and converted a nearby farm into a B&B. Roberts said, "It's been a bit spiritual for me in lots of ways, I can't really explain it. I just feel it and I felt it when I started to come to Wales in recent times, I just felt this sense of being at home, at peace and happy."

Roberts is a patron of the Rhondda Tunnel Society, which hopes to reopen a nearby tunnel, originally built in 1890 to haul coal to Swansea, for cyclists.

== Credits ==
Television

- Put Your Money Where Your Mouth Is
- How to Survive the Property Crisis
- Wish You Were Here...?
- Homes Under the Hammer
- BBC Breakfast
- BBC News 24
- The One Show
- Ready Steady Cook
- Would I Lie To You?
- Hole in the Wall
- Celebrity MasterChef
- Pointless
- Dave Gorman: Modern Life is Goodish
- I'm a Celebrity...Get Me Out of Here!
- The Real Full Monty
- Oops I Bought A Pub

Radio

- BBC Radio
- The Jeremy Vine Show
- Moneybox
- Gazumped

Books

- Great Festivals of the World
- The Travellers Handbook
- Intrepid Africa
- The Villes
- Teach Yourself Making Money from Property
- The Property Auction Guide
