= 1997–98 FA Premier League =

Football season in England

FA Premier League
- Season: 1997–98
- Dates: 9 August 1997 – 10 May 1998
- Champions: Arsenal; 1st Premier League title 11th English title
- Relegated: Bolton Wanderers; Barnsley; Crystal Palace
- Champions League: Arsenal; Manchester United
- Cup Winners' Cup: Chelsea; Newcastle United
- UEFA Cup: Aston Villa (through UEFA Respect Fair Play ranking); Blackburn Rovers; Leeds United; Liverpool
- UEFA Intertoto Cup: Crystal Palace
- Matches: 380
- Goals: 1,019 (2.68 per match)
- Top goalscorer: Dion Dublin; Michael Owen; Chris Sutton (18 goals each)
- Best goalkeeper: Peter Schmeichel (16 clean sheets)
- Biggest home win: Manchester United 7–0 Barnsley (25 October 1997)
- Biggest away win: Barnsley 0–6 Chelsea (24 August 1997)
- Highest scoring: Blackburn Rovers 7–2 Sheffield Wednesday (25 August 1997)
- Longest winning run: 10 games Arsenal
- Longest unbeaten run: 18 games Arsenal
- Longest winless run: 15 games Crystal Palace
- Longest losing run: 8 games Crystal Palace
- Highest attendance: 55,306; Manchester United 2–0 Wimbledon (28 March 1998)
- Lowest attendance: 7,668; Wimbledon 4–1 Barnsley (23 September 1997)
- Total attendance: 11,100,919
- Average attendance: 29,213

The 1997–98 FA Premier League (known as the FA Carling Premiership for sponsorship reasons) was the sixth season of the FA Premier League. It saw Arsenal lift their first league title since 1991 and, in so doing, became only the second team to win The Double for the second time.

It was Arsenal's first full season under French manager Arsène Wenger, who became the third manager to win the Premier League. Wenger followed in the footsteps of Alex Ferguson and Kenny Dalglish and, while both Ferguson and Dalglish were Scottish, Wenger was the first manager from outside the British Isles to win a league title in England.

== Season summary ==
At the end of the 1997–98 FA Premier League season, a record total of nine English teams qualified for European competition.

Premiership champions Arsenal and runners-up Manchester United qualified for the Champions League, while UEFA Cup places went to Liverpool, Leeds United, Aston Villa and Blackburn Rovers. Qualifying for the UEFA Cup Winners' Cup were Chelsea (as defending champions) and FA Cup runners-up Newcastle United. Crystal Palace, while finishing bottom, qualified for the Intertoto Cup.

Manchester United led the table for most of the season, before a dip in form during the final two months of the campaign saw Arsenal overtake them in April, taking advantage of games in hand, and winning the league title with two away matches remaining, although the gap between the champions and runners-up was a single point in the final table as Arsenal lost their final two away fixtures and Alex Ferguson's men won both of theirs. Arsenal then completed the double by winning the FA Cup. Despite the sudden dismissal of FA Cup-winning player-manager Ruud Gullit, Chelsea won the League Cup and European Cup Winners Cup under new player-manager Gianluca Vialli.

The gap between the Premier League and Division One of the Football League was highlighted at the end of 1997–98 when all three newly promoted teams were relegated. Crystal Palace was confined to the bottom place in the final table, having won just two home games all season and losing most of their games in the second half of the campaign. Barnsley's first season in the top division ended in relegation, although they did reach the FA Cup quarter finals and knocked out Manchester United in the Fifth Round. Bolton Wanderers went down on goal difference, with 17th place being occupied by Everton: despite preserving top-flight football for the 45th season running, Howard Kendall quit as manager at Goodison Park after his third spell in charge.

Another mark of the gap was that the three relegated teams in the previous season took the top three places in the 1997–98 Football League. Had Sunderland not lost the play-off final to Charlton Athletic on a penalty shootout, the 20 teams from the 1998–99 Premier League would have been exactly the same as those in the 1996–97 Premier League.

== Teams ==
Twenty teams competed in the league – the top seventeen teams from the previous season and the three teams promoted from the First Division. The promoted teams were Bolton Wanderers (returning after a season's absence), Barnsley (playing in the top flight for the first time) and Crystal Palace (playing in the top flight after a two-year absence). They replaced Sunderland, Middlesbrough and Nottingham Forest, who were relegated to the First Division after top flight spells of one, two and three years respectively.

=== Stadiums and locations ===
Locations of the 1997–98 Premier League teams
Greater London Premier League football clubs

Team	Location	Stadium	Capacity
Arsenal	London (Highbury)	Arsenal Stadium	38,419
Aston Villa	Birmingham	Villa Park	42,573
Barnsley	Barnsley	Oakwell	23,287
Blackburn Rovers	Blackburn	Ewood Park	31,367
Bolton Wanderers	Bolton	Reebok Stadium	28,723
Chelsea	London (Fulham)	Stamford Bridge	42,055
Coventry City	Coventry	Highfield Road	23,489
Crystal Palace	London (Selhurst)	Selhurst Park	26,074
Derby County	Derby	Pride Park Stadium (Note: Derby County relocated to the Pride Park Stadium as their new home stadium after spending 102 years at Baseball Ground.)	33,597
Everton	Liverpool (Walton)	Goodison Park	40,569
Leeds United	Leeds	Elland Road	40,242
Leicester City	Leicester	Filbert Street	22,000
Liverpool	Liverpool (Anfield)	Anfield	45,522
Manchester United	Manchester	Old Trafford	55,385
Newcastle United	Newcastle upon Tyne	St James' Park	52,387
Sheffield Wednesday	Sheffield	Hillsborough Stadium	39,732
Southampton	Southampton	The Dell	15,200
Tottenham Hotspur	London (Tottenham)	White Hart Lane	36,240
West Ham United	London (Upton Park)	Boleyn Ground	35,647
Wimbledon	London (Selhurst)	Selhurst Park (Note: Due to Wimbledon lacking a home stadium, they played their home games at Selhurst Park, which is the home stadium of Crystal Palace.)	26,074

=== Personnel and kits ===
A list of personnel and kits of the clubs in the 1997–98 FA Premier League.

Team	Manager	Captain	Kit manufacturer	Shirt sponsor
Arsenal	(France) Arsène Wenger	(England) Tony Adams	Nike	JVC
Aston Villa	(England) John Gregory	(England) Gareth Southgate	Reebok	AST
Barnsley	(Northern Ireland) Danny Wilson	(England) Neil Redfearn	Admiral	Ora
Blackburn Rovers	(England) Roy Hodgson	(England) Tim Sherwood	Asics	CIS
Bolton Wanderers	(England) Colin Todd	(Iceland) Guðni Bergsson	Reebok	Reebok
Chelsea	(Italy) Gianluca Vialli	(England) Dennis Wise	Umbro	Autoglass
Coventry City	(Scotland) Gordon Strachan	(Scotland) Gary McAllister	Le Coq Sportif	Subaru
Crystal Palace	(England) Ron Noades (England) Ray Lewington (caretakers)	(England) Andy Linighan	Adidas	TDK
Derby County	(England) Jim Smith	(Croatia) Igor Štimac	Puma	Puma
Everton	(England) Howard Kendall	(England) Dave Watson	Umbro	One2One
Leeds United	(Scotland) George Graham	(South Africa) Lucas Radebe	Puma	Packard Bell
Leicester City	(Northern Ireland) Martin O'Neill	(England) Steve Walsh	Fox Leisure	Walkers
Liverpool	(England) Roy Evans	(England) Paul Ince	Reebok	Carlsberg
Manchester United	(Scotland) Alex Ferguson	(Republic of Ireland) Roy Keane	Umbro	Sharp
Newcastle United	(Scotland) Kenny Dalglish	(England) Robert Lee	Adidas	Newcastle Brown Ale
Sheffield Wednesday	(England) Ron Atkinson	(England) Peter Atherton	Puma	Sanderson
Southampton	(England) Dave Jones	(England) Matt Le Tissier	Pony	Sanderson
Tottenham Hotspur	(Switzerland) Christian Gross	(England) Gary Mabbutt	Pony	Hewlett-Packard
West Ham United	(England) Harry Redknapp	(Northern Ireland) Steve Lomas	Pony	(no sponsor)
Wimbledon	(Republic of Ireland) Joe Kinnear	(Jamaica) Robbie Earle	Lotto	Elonex

=== Managerial changes ===
Team	Outgoing manager	Manner of departure	Date of vacancy	Position in table	Incoming manager	Date of appointment
Nottingham Forest	(England) Stuart Pearce	End of caretaker spell	8 May 1997	Pre-season	(England) Dave Bassett	8 May 1997
Everton	(England) Dave Watson	End of caretaker spell	10 May 1997	Pre-season	(England) Howard Kendall	10 May 1997
Blackburn Rovers	(England) Tony Parkes	End of caretaker spell	1 June 1997	Pre-season	(England) Roy Hodgson	1 June 1997
Southampton	(Scotland) Graeme Souness	Resigned	1 June 1997	Pre-season	(England) Dave Jones	23 June 1997
Sheffield Wednesday	(England) David Pleat	Sacked	3 November 1997	20th	(Wales) Peter Shreeves (caretaker)	3 November 1997
Sheffield Wednesday	(Wales) Peter Shreeves (caretaker)	End of caretaker spell	14 November 1997	19th	(England) Ron Atkinson (caretaker)	14 November 1997
Tottenham Hotspur	(England) Gerry Francis	Resigned	19 November 1997	16th	(Switzerland) Christian Gross	19 November 1997
Chelsea	(Netherlands) Ruud Gullit	Sacked	12 February 1998	2nd	(Italy) Gianluca Vialli	12 February 1998
Aston Villa	(England) Brian Little	Resigned	24 February 1998	15th	(England) John Gregory	25 February 1998
Crystal Palace	(England) Steve Coppell	Promoted to director of football	13 March 1998	20th	(Italy) Attilio Lombardo (caretaker) (Note: Swedish striker Tomas Brolin served as Italian-to-English interpreter for Lombardo)	13 March 1998
Crystal Palace	(Italy) Attilio Lombardo	Resigned	29 April 1998	20th	(England) Ron Noades (England) Ray Lewington (caretakers) (Note: Noades and Lewington acted as co-managers)	29 April 1998

== League table ==
Pos	Team	Pld	W	D	L	GF	GA	GD	Pts	Qualification or relegation
1	Arsenal (C)	38	23	9	6	68	33	+35	78	Qualification for the Champions League group stage
2	Manchester United	38	23	8	7	73	26	+47	77	Qualification for the Champions League second qualifying round
3	Liverpool	38	18	11	9	68	42	+26	65	Qualification for the UEFA Cup first round
4	Chelsea	38	20	3	15	71	43	+28	63	Qualification for the Cup Winners' Cup first round (Note: Chelsea qualified for the Cup Winners' Cup as defending champions. As they were also the League Cup winners, the UEFA Cup berth vacated was awarded to Blackburn Rovers.)
5	Leeds United	38	17	8	13	57	46	+11	59	Qualification for the UEFA Cup first round (Note: Aston Villa was rewarded entry to the UEFA Cup through UEFA Fair Play ranking.)
6	Blackburn Rovers	38	16	10	12	57	52	+5	58	Qualification for the UEFA Cup first round
7	Aston Villa	38	17	6	15	49	48	+1	57	Qualification for the UEFA Cup first round
8	West Ham United	38	16	8	14	56	57	−1	56	
9	Derby County	38	16	7	15	52	49	+3	55	
10	Leicester City	38	13	14	11	51	41	+10	53	
11	Coventry City	38	12	16	10	46	44	+2	52	
12	Southampton	38	14	6	18	50	55	−5	48	
13	Newcastle United	38	11	11	16	35	44	−9	44	Qualification for the Cup Winners' Cup first round (Note: As Arsenal qualified for the Champions League, their Cup Winners' Cup place as FA Cup winners defaulted to Newcastle United, the runners-up.)
14	Tottenham Hotspur	38	11	11	16	44	56	−12	44	
15	Wimbledon	38	10	14	14	34	46	−12	44	
16	Sheffield Wednesday	38	12	8	18	52	67	−15	44	
17	Everton	38	9	13	16	41	56	−15	40	
18	Bolton Wanderers (R)	38	9	13	16	41	61	−20	40	Relegation to the Football League First Division
19	Barnsley (R)	38	10	5	23	37	82	−45	35	Relegation to the Football League First Division
20	Crystal Palace (Note: Crystal Palace qualified for the 1998 Intertoto Cup as they were the only English team who applied.) (R)	38	8	9	21	37	71	−34	33	Intertoto Cup third round and relegation to the First Division

Source: Premier League
Rules for classification: 1) points; 2) goal difference; 3) number of goals scored.
(C) Champions; (R) Relegated

== Results ==
Home \ Away	ARS	AVL	BAR	BLB	BOL	CHE	COV	CRY	DER	EVE	LEE	LEI	LIV	MUN	NEW	SHW	SOU	TOT	WHU	WIM
Arsenal		0–0	5–0	1–3	4–1	2–0	2–0	1–0	1–0	4–0	2–1	2–1	0–1	3–2	3–1	1–0	3–0	0–0	4–0	5–0
Aston Villa	1–0		0–1	0–4	1–3	0–2	3–0	3–1	2–1	2–1	1–0	1–1	2–1	0–2	0–1	2–2	1–1	4–1	2–0	1–2
Barnsley	0–2	0–3		1–1	2–1	0–6	2–0	1–0	1–0	2–2	2–3	0–2	2–3	0–2	2–2	2–1	4–3	1–1	1–2	2–1
Blackburn Rovers	1–4	5–0	2–1		3–1	1–0	0–0	2–2	1–0	3–2	3–4	5–3	1–1	1–3	1–0	7–2	1–0	0–3	3–0	0–0
Bolton Wanderers	0–1	0–1	1–1	2–1		1–0	1–5	5–2	3–3	0–0	2–3	2–0	1–1	0–0	1–0	3–2	0–0	1–1	1–1	1–0
Chelsea	2–3	0–1	2–0	0–1	2–0		3–1	6–2	4–0	2–0	0–0	1–0	4–1	0–1	1–0	1–0	4–2	2–0	2–1	1–1
Coventry City	2–2	1–2	1–0	2–0	2–2	3–2		1–1	1–0	0–0	0–0	0–2	1–1	3–2	2–2	1–0	1–0	4–0	1–1	0–0
Crystal Palace	0–0	1–1	0–1	1–2	2–2	0–3	0–3		3–1	1–3	0–2	0–3	0–3	0–3	1–2	1–0	1–1	1–3	3–3	0–3
Derby County	3–0	0–1	1–0	3–1	4–0	0–1	3–1	0–0		3–1	0–5	0–4	1–0	2–2	1–0	3–0	4–0	2–1	2–0	1–1
Everton	2–2	1–4	4–2	1–0	3–2	3–1	1–1	1–2	1–2		2–0	1–1	2–0	0–2	0–0	1–3	0–2	0–2	2–1	0–0
Leeds United	1–1	1–1	2–1	4–0	2–0	3–1	3–3	0–2	4–3	0–0		0–1	0–2	1–0	4–1	1–2	0–1	1–0	3–1	1–1
Leicester City	3–3	1–0	1–0	1–1	0–0	2–0	1–1	1–1	1–2	0–1	1–0		0–0	0–0	0–0	1–1	3–3	3–0	2–1	0–1
Liverpool	4–0	3–0	0–1	0–0	2–1	4–2	1–0	2–1	4–0	1–1	3–1	1–2		1–3	1–0	2–1	2–3	4–0	5–0	2–0
Manchester United	0–1	1–0	7–0	4–0	1–1	2–2	3–0	2–0	2–0	2–0	3–0	0–1	1–1		1–1	6–1	1–0	2–0	2–1	2–0
Newcastle United	0–1	1–0	2–1	1–1	2–1	3–1	0–0	1–2	0–0	1–0	1–1	3–3	1–2	0–1		2–1	2–1	1–0	0–1	1–3
Sheffield Wednesday	2–0	1–3	2–1	0–0	5–0	1–4	0–0	1–3	2–5	3–1	1–3	1–0	3–3	2–0	2–1		1–0	1–0	1–1	1–1
Southampton	1–3	1–2	4–1	3–0	0–1	1–0	1–2	1–0	0–2	2–1	0–2	2–1	1–1	1–0	2–1	2–3		3–2	3–0	0–1
Tottenham Hotspur	1–1	3–2	3–0	0–0	1–0	1–6	1–1	0–1	1–0	1–1	0–1	1–1	3–3	0–2	2–0	3–2	1–1		1–0	0–0
West Ham United	0–0	2–1	6–0	2–1	3–0	2–1	1–0	4–1	0–0	2–2	3–0	4–3	2–1	1–1	0–1	1–0	2–4	2–1		3–1
Wimbledon	0–1	2–1	4–1	0–1	0–0	0–2	1–2	0–1	0–0	0–0	1–0	2–1	1–1	2–5	0–0	1–1	1–0	2–6	1–2	

Source: Premier League
Legend: Blue = home team win; Yellow = draw; Red = away team win.

== Season statistics ==
=== Scoring ===
==== Top scorers ====
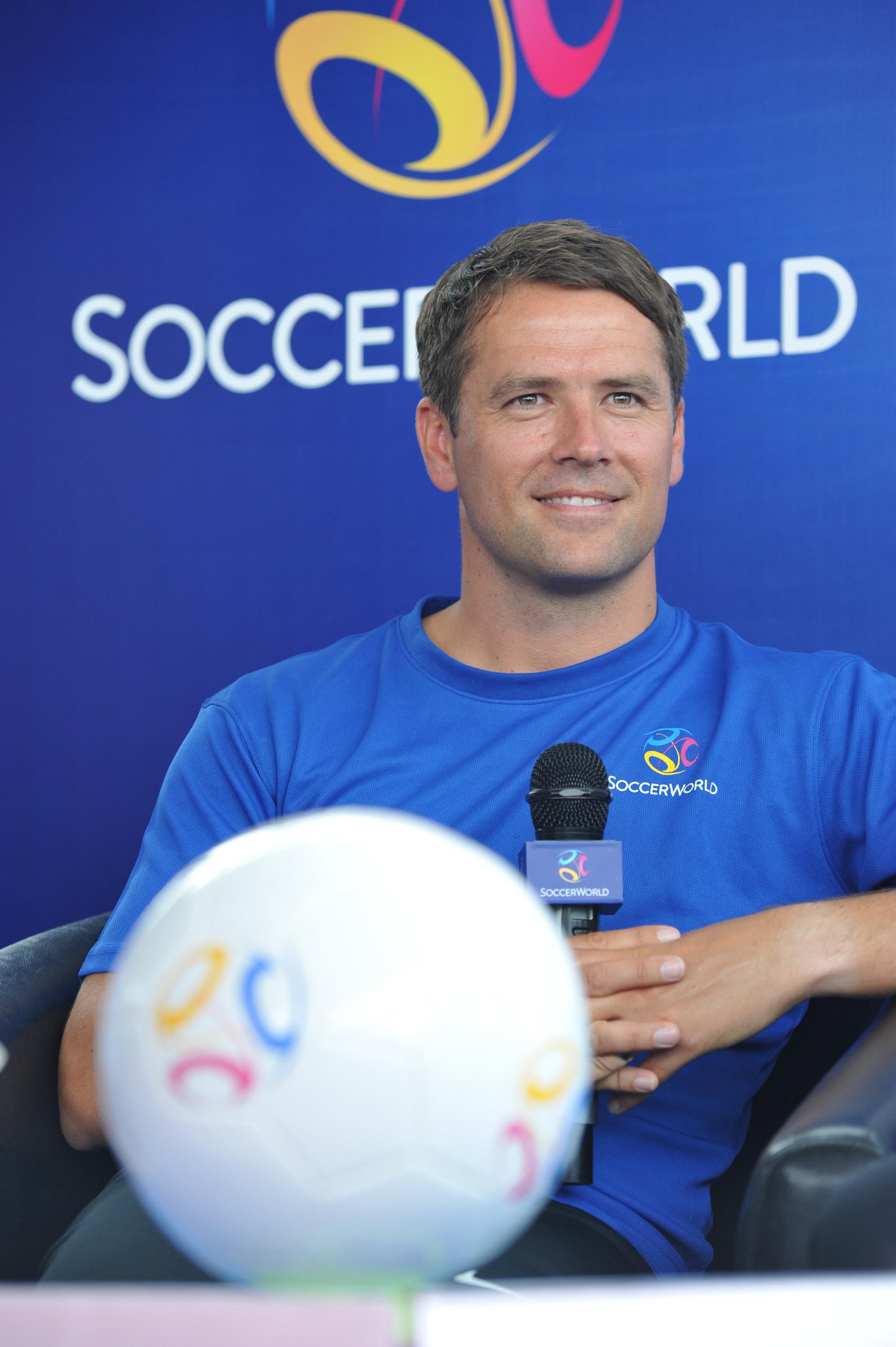
Liverpool's Michael Owen was the joint top scorer, with 18 goals.

Rank	Player	Club	Goals
1	(England) Dion Dublin	Coventry City	18
1	(England) Michael Owen	Liverpool	18
1	(England) Chris Sutton	Blackburn Rovers	18
4	(Netherlands) Dennis Bergkamp	Arsenal	16
4	(Scotland) Kevin Gallacher	Blackburn Rovers	16
4	(Netherlands) Jimmy Floyd Hasselbaink	Leeds United	16
7	(England) Andy Cole	Manchester United	15
7	(Wales) John Hartson	West Ham United	15
9	(England) Darren Huckerby	Coventry City	14
10	(Costa Rica) Paulo Wanchope	Derby County	13

==== Hat-tricks ====
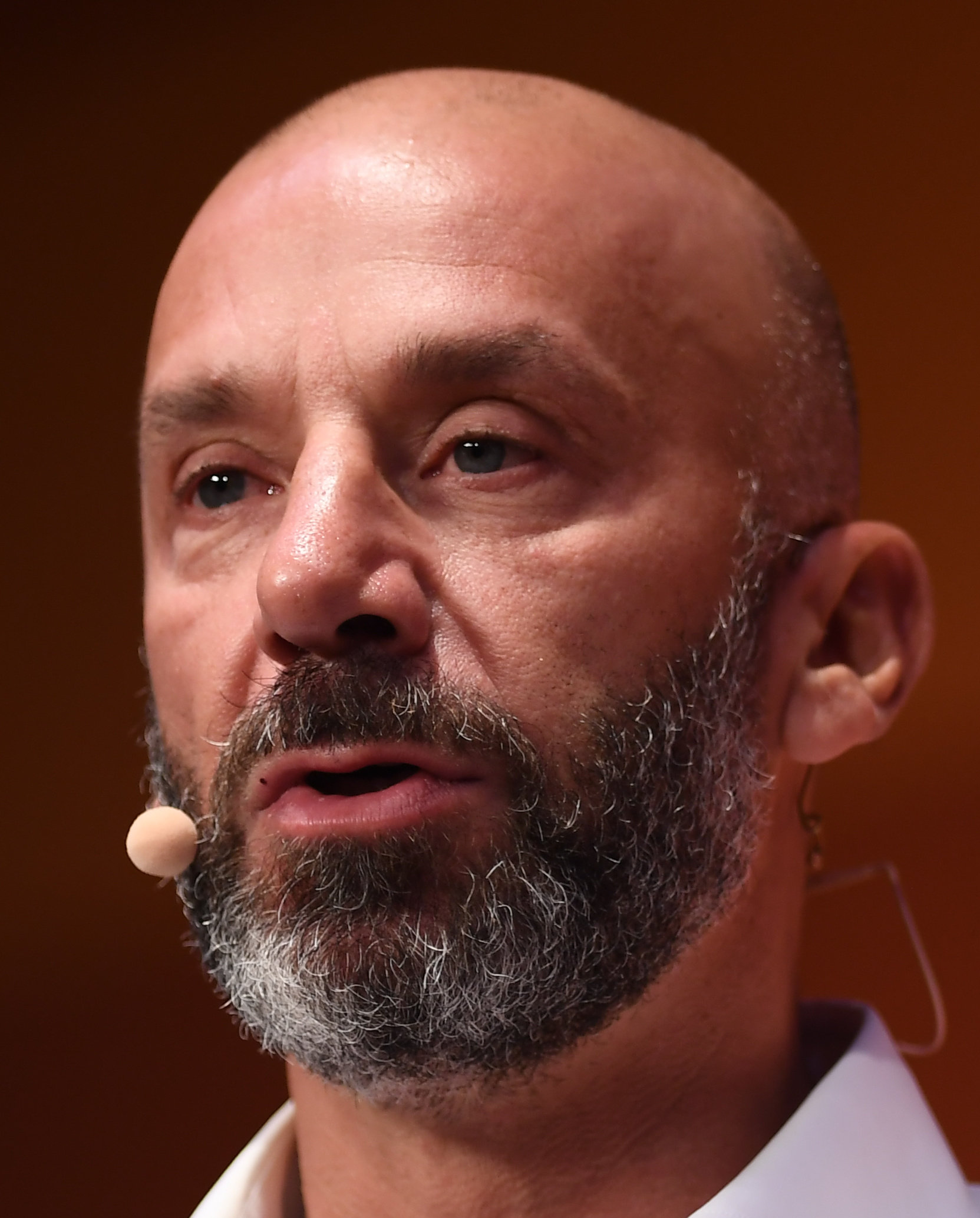
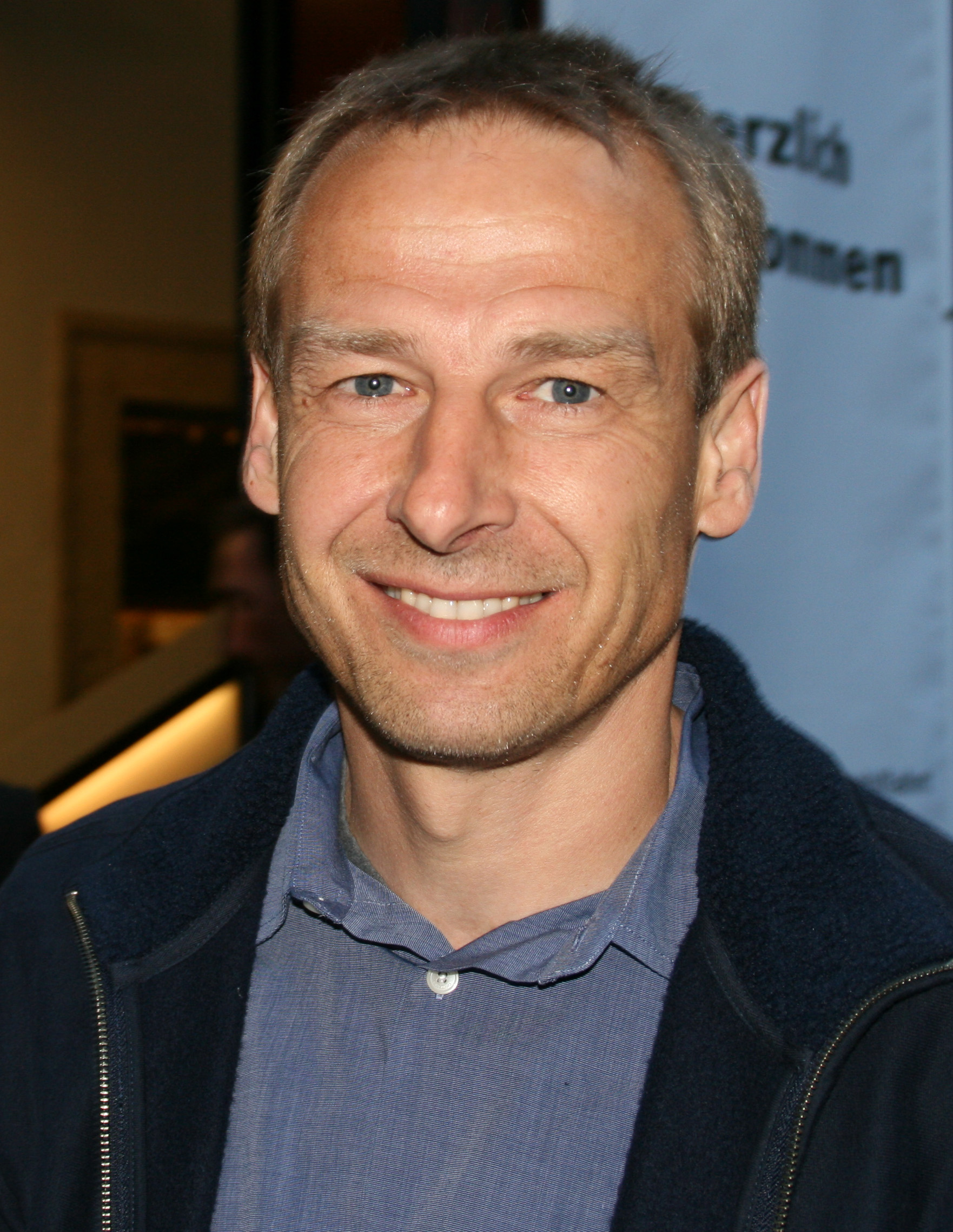
Chelsea's Gianluca Vialli and Tottenham's Jürgen Klinsmann both scored four goals in a match during the 1997–98 Premier League season. In addition, Vialli scored a perfect hat-trick (left foot, right foot, header).

Player	For	Against	Result	Date	Ref
(England) Dion Dublin	Coventry City	Chelsea	3–2 (A)	9 August 1997	
(England) Chris Sutton	Blackburn Rovers	Aston Villa	4–0 (A)	13 August 1997	
(Italy) Gianluca Vialli^{4} ^{P}	Chelsea	Barnsley	6–0 (A)	24 August 1997	
(Netherlands) Dennis Bergkamp	Arsenal	Leicester City	3–3 (A)	27 August 1997	
(England) Ian Wright	Arsenal	Bolton Wanderers	4–1 (H)	13 September 1997	
(Czech Republic) Patrik Berger	Liverpool	Chelsea	4–2 (H)	5 October 1997	
(England) Andy Cole	Manchester United	Barnsley	7–0 (H)	25 October 1997	
(England) Andy Booth	Sheffield Wednesday	Bolton Wanderers	5–0 (H)	8 November 1997	
(Italy) Gianfranco Zola	Chelsea	Derby County	4–0 (H)	29 November 1997	
(Norway) Tore André Flo	Chelsea	Tottenham Hotspur	6–1 (A)	6 December 1997	
(Scotland) Duncan Ferguson	Everton	Bolton Wanderers	3–2 (H)	28 December 1997	
(Scotland) Kevin Gallacher	Blackburn Rovers	Aston Villa	5–0 (H)	17 January 1998	
(England) Michael Owen	Liverpool	Sheffield Wednesday	3–3 (A)	14 February 1998	
(England) Chris Sutton	Blackburn Rovers	Leicester City	5–3 (A)	28 February 1998	
(England) Darren Huckerby	Coventry City	Leeds United	3–3 (A)	25 April 1998	
(Germany) Jürgen Klinsmann^{4}	Tottenham Hotspur	Wimbledon	6–2 (A)	2 May 1998	

Note: ^{4} Player scored 4 goals; ^{P} Player scored a perfect hat-trick; (H) – Home; (A) – Away

== Awards ==
=== Monthly awards ===
Month	Manager of the Month		Player of the Month	
Month	Manager	Club	Player	Club
August	(England) Roy Hodgson	Blackburn Rovers	(Netherlands) Dennis Bergkamp	Arsenal
September	(Northern Ireland) Martin O'Neill	Leicester City	(Netherlands) Dennis Bergkamp	Arsenal
October	(Scotland) Alex Ferguson	Manchester United	(Costa Rica) Paulo Wanchope	Derby County
November	(Scotland) George Graham	Leeds United	(England) Andy Cole (England) Kevin Davies	Manchester United; Southampton
December	(England) Roy Hodgson	Blackburn Rovers	(England) Steve McManaman	Liverpool
January	(England) Howard Kendall	Everton	(England) Dion Dublin	Coventry City
February	(Scotland) Gordon Strachan	Coventry City	(England) Chris Sutton	Blackburn Rovers
March	(France) Arsène Wenger	Arsenal	(Austria) Alex Manninger	Arsenal
April	(France) Arsène Wenger	Arsenal	(France) Emmanuel Petit	Arsenal

=== Annual awards ===
Award	Winner	Club
Premier League Manager of the Season	(France) Arsène Wenger	Arsenal
Premier League Player of the Season	(England) Michael Owen	Liverpool
PFA Players' Player of the Year	(Netherlands) Dennis Bergkamp	Arsenal
PFA Young Player of the Year	(England) Michael Owen	Liverpool
FWA Footballer of the Year	(Netherlands) Dennis Bergkamp	Arsenal

PFA Team of the Year
Goalkeeper	(England) Nigel Martyn (Leeds United)			
Defence	(England) Gary Neville (Manchester United)	(England) Gary Pallister (Manchester United)	(Scotland) Colin Hendry (Blackburn Rovers)	(England) Graeme Le Saux (Chelsea)
Midfield	(England) David Beckham (Manchester United)	(England) Nicky Butt (Manchester United)	(England) David Batty (Newcastle United)	(Wales) Ryan Giggs (Manchester United)
Attack	(England) Michael Owen (Liverpool)		(Netherlands) Dennis Bergkamp (Arsenal)	

== Attendances ==
No.	Club	Matches	Total attendance	Average
1	Manchester United	19	1,048,125	55,164
2	Liverpool FC	19	771,937	40,628
3	Arsenal FC	19	723,009	38,053
4	Newcastle United	19	696,762	36,672
5	Aston Villa	19	686,587	36,136
6	Everton FC	19	671,740	35,355
7	Leeds United	19	658,175	34,641
8	Chelsea FC	19	634,357	33,387
9	Tottenham Hotspur	19	553,731	29,144
10	Derby County	19	552,987	29,105
11	Sheffield Wednesday	19	545,423	28,706
12	Blackburn Rovers	19	479,804	25,253
13	West Ham United	19	476,428	25,075
14	Bolton Wanderers	19	462,693	24,352
15	Crystal Palace	19	417,673	21,983
16	Leicester City	19	391,689	20,615
17	Coventry City	19	374,722	19,722
18	Barnsley FC	19	350,412	18,443
19	Wimbledon FC	19	316,652	16,666
20	Southampton FC	19	288,013	15,159

== See also ==
- 1997–98 in English football
