= Martel Maxwell =

Scottish journalist and presenter

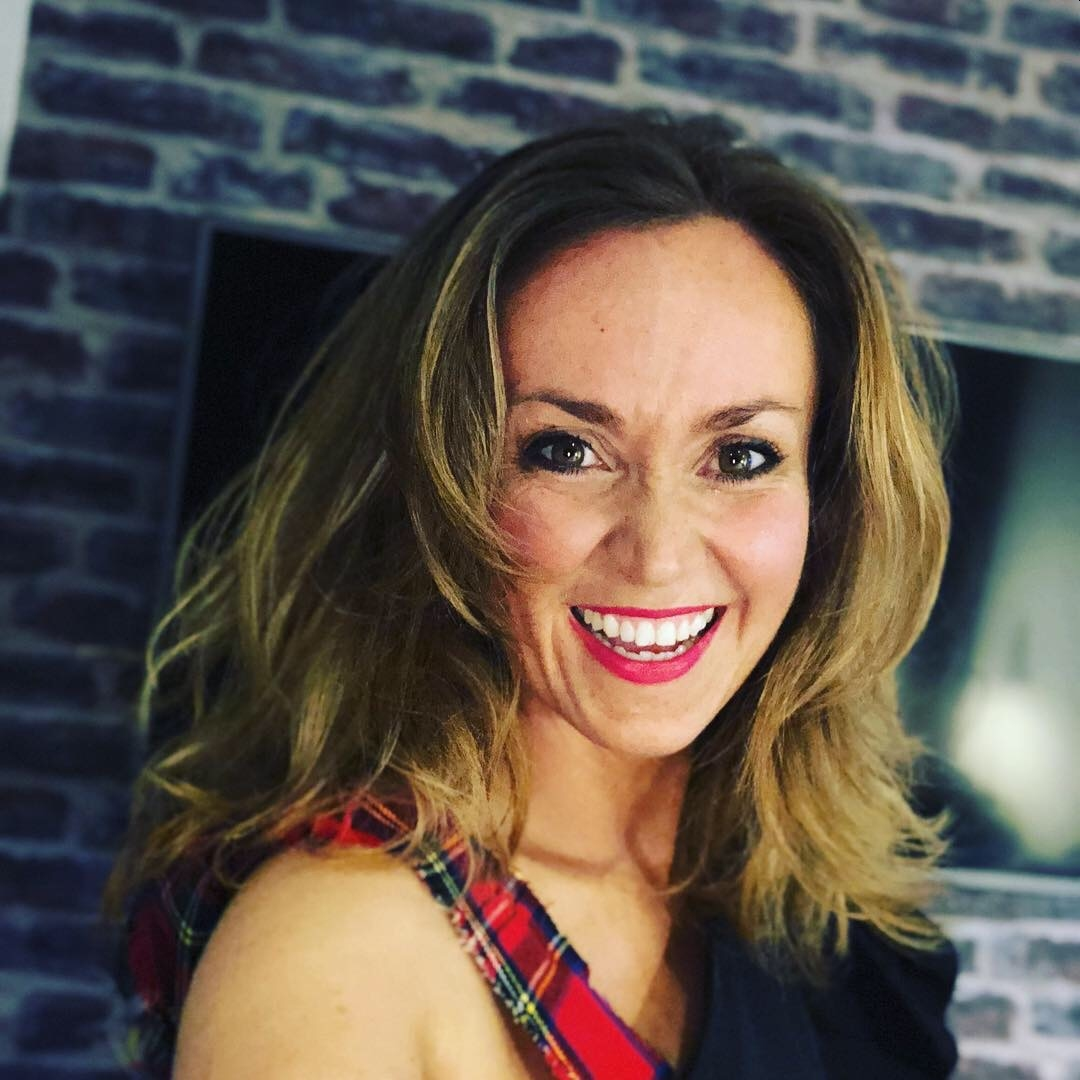
- Maxwell in 2020
- Born: 9 March 1977 (age 49); Dundee, Scotland
- Occupations: TV presenter, journalist, writer
- Years active: 2010–present
- Known for: Homes Under the Hammer (2017–)

Martel Maxwell (born 9 March 1977) is a Scottish television presenter and journalist. She has been one of the presenters of the property show Homes Under the Hammer since 2017. She also writes a column for the Dundee-based newspaper Evening Telegraph.

== Early life ==
Maxwell was born on 9 March 1977, and was born and raised in Dundee. She attended the High School of Dundee, before studying law at the University of Edinburgh and then taking a postgraduate diploma in law at the University of Dundee. Instead of continuing with law, Maxwell turned to journalism.

== Newspaper journalism ==
Maxwell's first post was as a graduate intern at The Sun taking a diploma in newspaper journalism at London City University. After seven years at The Sun writing for city, women's news, and showbusiness, she went freelance. Maxwell wrote some freelance opinion pieces for The Scottish Sun and since 2013 has written a weekly column for local paper Evening Telegraph in Dundee.

== Broadcast journalism ==
Maxwell's earliest broadcast job was in 2010 as an occasional reporter on the BBC show The One Show and then a regular entertainment contributor on the ITV show Lorraine and one of the presenters of a short-lived BBC3 consumer affairs programme Don't Get Screwed and BBC Scotland magazine show On the Road. Since 2017, she has been one of the three presenters of the BBC property programme Homes Under the Hammer, replacing Lucy Alexander.

Maxwell was an occasional guest presenter on BBC Radio Scotland and in 2008, had her own show on Edinburgh station Talk 107 until the station folded. In 2021, she provided voiceover narration for the third series of BBC Scotland's documentary Inside Central Station.

== Writer ==
Maxwell published a novel, Scandalous, in 2010. Based on her experiences as a showbusiness reporter, The Daily Telegraph considered that it gave "a thrilling insight into the celebrity-baiting world of the kiss and tell" but also considered that "the narrative is weighed down by product placement".

== Personal life ==
Maxwell lives near Dundee with her husband, Jamie Parret, and their three sons.
