= Martin Johansen =

Danish footballer (born 1972)

Personal information
- Full name: Martin Bro Johansen
- Date of birth: 22 July 1972 (age 54)
- Place of birth: Glostrup, Denmark
- Positions: Midfielder; forward

Youth career
- 1976–19??: Rosenhøj IF
- 19??–1990: Kjøbenhavns Boldklub

Senior career*
Years	Team	Apps	(Gls)
1990–1991	Kjøbenhavns Boldklub		
1991–1992	B 1903		
1992–1997	FC København	116	(30)
1997–1998	Coventry City	2	(0)
1999–2001	Lyngby BK		
2001–2003	Farum BK		

International career
1990–1991	Denmark U-19	3	(0)
1991–1993	Denmark U-21	7	(0)
1993	Denmark	1	(0)
- * Club domestic league appearances and goals

Martin Bro Johansen (Danish pronunciation: [ˈmɑːtsʰin ˈjoːhænˀsn̩]; born 22 July 1972) is a Danish former footballer. He played usually as a midfielder but could also play as a forward. During his career he played for FC Copenhagen, B 1903 and most notably Coventry City in the FA Premier League.

Johansen appeared once for the Danish national team in his career. His twin brother Michael Johansen was also a professional footballer.

== Honours ==
Copenhagen

- Danish Cup: 1994–95, 1996–97
- Danish Super Cup: 1995
