= Darren Huckerby =

English footballer (born 1976)

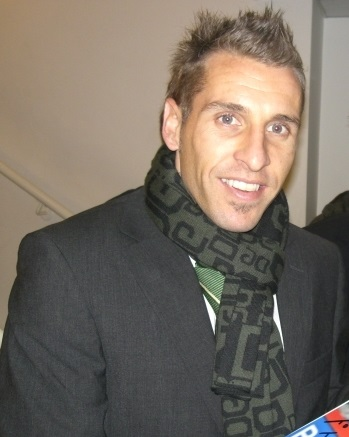
- Huckerby in 2011

Personal information
- Full name: Darren Carl Huckerby
- Date of birth: 23 April 1976 (age 50)
- Place of birth: Nottingham, England
- Position: Forward

Team information
- Current team: Norwich City (Academy Coach)

Senior career*
Years	Team	Apps	(Gls)
1993–1995	Lincoln City	28	(5)
1995–1996	Newcastle United	1	(0)
1996	→ Millwall (loan)	6	(3)
1996–1999	Coventry City	94	(28)
1999–2000	Leeds United	40	(2)
2000–2003	Manchester City	69	(22)
2003	→ Nottingham Forest (loan)	9	(5)
2003	→ Norwich City (loan)	16	(5)
2003–2008	Norwich City	174	(36)
2008–2009	San Jose Earthquakes	28	(9)
Total		465	(115)

International career
1998	England B	1	(0)
- * Club domestic league appearances and goals

Darren Carl Huckerby (born 23 April 1976) is an English football coach and former professional footballer.

As a player, he was a forward who notably played in the Premier League for Newcastle United, Coventry City, Leeds United, Manchester City and Norwich City. He also featured for Lincoln City, Millwall and Nottingham Forest. He finished his career by playing in the United States in Major League Soccer for San Jose Earthquakes. He was capped once at England B level.

Following retirement, he had a spell as academy coach for the Under 16s of former club Norwich City.

== Club career ==
=== Lincoln City ===
Huckerby was born in Nottingham, England. His mother is of partial Georgian descent. Huckerby started playing professionally for Lincoln City in Football League Division Three. Huckerby was promoted to the first team at Sincil Bank by Keith Alexander, but also played under the stewardship of both Sam Ellis and Steve Wicks before being sold in 1995. He finished his spell with Lincoln having scored 5 goals in 28 league appearances.

=== Newcastle United ===
Huckerby made a three division step up by signing for Premier League title contenders Newcastle United in a £400,000 deal in 1995. Despite being highly rated by the fans and pundits, Huckerby found first team chances severely limited, especially since manager Kevin Keegan decided to scrap the reserve team, in response to a requirement from the FA that a certain percentage of home reserve fixtures be played at St James' Park. Keegan believed that this would negatively affect the pitch condition, which was already in poor state. This of course meant that, with no reserve team football, Huckerby was not match fit for the majority of his time on Tyneside. Huckerby made only two appearances for the Magpies (one in the league and one in the FA Cup), before being loaned out to Millwall. Huckerby then joined Coventry City for £1 million in time for the start of the next season, signed by then City boss Gordon Strachan.

=== Coventry City ===
The striker's pace and dribbling ability, combined with a very successful partnership with Dion Dublin saw Huckerby play a key role at Coventry. Huckerby and Dublin's partnership did not go unnoticed and earned Huckerby a call up to the England B squad, whilst Dublin managed call ups to the full squad, under Glenn Hoddle. Huckerby played a major role in Coventry's Premier League survival, culminating with a final day 2–1 win at Tottenham Hotspur in 1997. His success with the Sky Blues continued throughout the following season as Coventry enjoyed a ten-game unbeaten run and reached the quarter finals of the FA Cup, narrowly losing on penalties to Sheffield United. Huckerby scored several goals, most notably the winner in a 3–2 victory over Manchester United at Highfield Road, a dazzling run past a few defenders before slotting past Kevin Pilkington. He notched up 14 goals that season, his best Premier League return of goals.

=== Leeds United ===
He was sold to Leeds United in the summer for a reputed £6 million. However, he had fewer chances of first team action following his transfer, and was less prolific in front of goal than he had been with Coventry.

In his time at Elland Road, he scored two goals in 40 league games, once against former club Coventry City and another against Watford. He had to compete for a place in the team with the likes of Mark Viduka, Alan Smith and Michael Bridges and as a result he was never a regular, although he did score against Partizan Belgrade in the 1999–2000 UEFA Cup, and in a 6–0 win against Beşiktaş in the 2000–01 Champions League. In all competitions, he scored six goals in total.

=== Manchester City ===
Manchester City signed him in December 2000 for £3.38 million, as they attempted to avoid relegation. Huckerby scored on his debut against Charlton Athletic, albeit in a 4–1 defeat. Although the club did eventually go down, he stayed on and won a First Division championship medal, adding 26 goals in all competitions during the campaign, including two hat-tricks.

Huckerby started the new campaign as first choice, and scored the team's first goal of the season, a header against former employer Newcastle that secured a 1–0 win. However, the arrivals of Nicolas Anelka and Jon Macken meant less playing time, and he eventually ended up playing out the end of the season on-loan to Nottingham Forest, being part of the team that reached the Division One playoffs in 2003.

=== Norwich City ===
Huckerby spent a three-month loan spell with Norwich City, before signing permanently in December 2003, for a fee of £750,000, which rose to £1 million when the Canaries were promoted at the end of the season. At Norwich, Huckerby's career settled, and he netted 14 league goals in the First Division in the 2003–04 season. He was instrumental in Norwich's march to the First Division championship in 2003–04, and came second in the supporters vote for player of the season behind Craig Fleming.

Reverting to a left wing role for much of Norwich's Premier League spell in 2004–05, Huckerby scored seven goals. He was linked with a transfer to either Liverpool or Celtic the following summer, but spoke of his intention to see out his contract in East Anglia.

He was voted Norwich City player of the year by supporters in 2004–05 and 2006–07, and placed second behind Gary Doherty for the 2005–06 season, winning the award twice and adding two runner-up positions in his first four seasons. He was voted into the Norwich City Hall of Fame in 2004. On 13 April 2008, he played his 200th game for Norwich, in the East Anglian Derby against Ipswich Town.

On 4 May 2008, Huckerby scored in his final game for the club in a 4–1 defeat away at Sheffield Wednesday. Two days later, it was announced that his contract would not be renewed as he could not be guaranteed a place in the first team in the 2008–09 season. This upset fans who felt that Huckerby, a fan favourite, deserved a proper farewell. However, an opportunity was made with a special tribute at a 'Greatest Ever' event at Carrow Road held later in May.

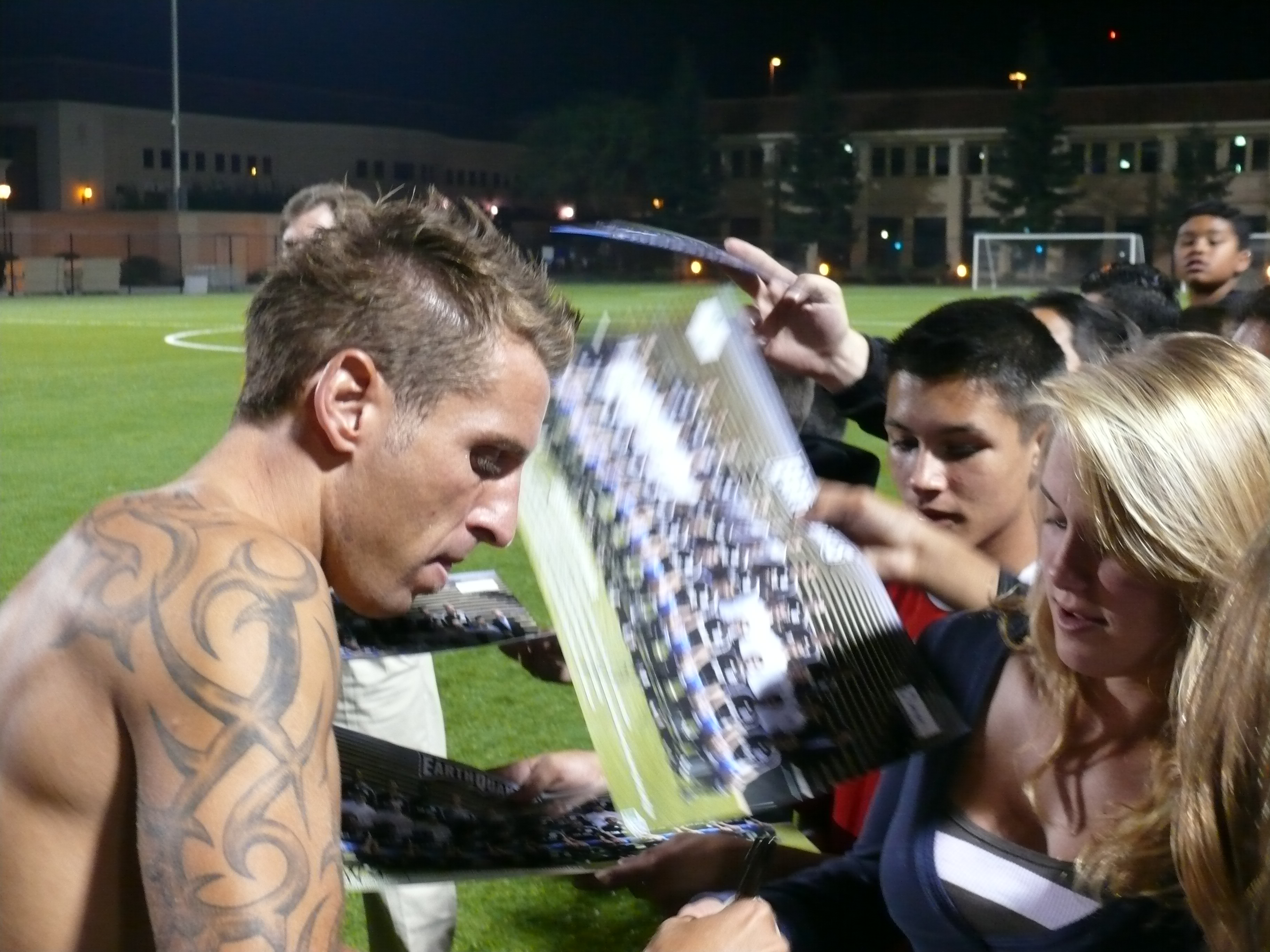
Huckerby signing autographs for San Jose Earthquakes fans

In 2012, Huckerby returned to Carrow Road to play in Adam Drury's testimonial match against Celtic, coming on in the 76th minute showing his trademark bursts of pace and skill. Former Celtic and Norwich striker John Hartson who was co-commentating on Setanta Sports claimed he looked fit and sharp enough still to be playing professionally.

=== San Jose Earthquakes ===
Huckerby moved to the United States joining Major League Soccer club, San Jose Earthquakes in July 2008. MLS rules at the time dictated that Toronto FC owned the right to sign Huckerby. To acquire those rights, San Jose traded allocation money and use of an international roster slot for the 2008 through 2013 seasons to Toronto.

He made his debut on 19 July 2008 against Toronto, in a 0–0 draw, and scored his first goal against New York Red Bulls on 27 July. In a crucial match for the Earthquakes, on 3 August 2008, Huckerby scored his second goal, against Los Angeles Galaxy, in a 3–2 Earthquakes win. On 30 August, he headed in the winning goal in the side's 2–1 victory over Kansas City Wizards, extending San Jose's unbeaten streak to seven games. During this stretch, Huckerby notched three goals and three assists.

On 11 November 2008, it was announced that Huckerby had won the 2008 MLS Newcomer of the Year Award.

During the 2009 Major League Soccer season, Huckerby underwent surgery to eliminate his hip injury. However, on 16 September 2009, at age 33, Huckerby announced that he was '99% sure' of his retirement.

== International career ==
Huckerby made one appearance with the England B team in 1998.

== Coaching career ==
He is a former academy coach for the Under 16s at championship side Norwich City.

== Personal life ==
Huckerby lives in Keswick, south Norfolk. His son Tom signed for Harleston Town in May 2025. Tom was arrested for drink driving in September 2025, receiving a 15-month ban.

After retiring from football in 2009, Huckerby returned to playing football in the Masters Tournament in June 2011 in which he scored 8 goals in the Yorkshire Masters for his old club Leeds United. In the Grand Masters final Huckerby added a further 6 goals to his tally, making him overall tournament golden boot winner with 14 goals. Leeds were overall runners up in the tournament, losing 8–3 to Rangers in the final.

On 14 April 2013, Huckerby played in a charity game at Lowestoft Town's Crown Meadow ground. He played for the ex professionals against a select eleven which included students from Lowestoft College.

== Career statistics ==
Appearances and goals by club, season and competition
Club	Season	League			FA Cup		League Cup		Continental		Total	
Club	Season	Division	Apps	Goals	Apps	Goals	Apps	Goals	Apps	Goals	Apps	Goals
Lincoln City	1993–94	Third Division	6	1	0	0	0	0	–		6	1
Lincoln City	1994–95	Third Division	6	2	0	0	0	0	–		6	2
Lincoln City	1995–96	Third Division	16	2	0	0	2	0	–		18	2
Lincoln City	Total		28	5	0	0	2	0	–		30	5
Newcastle United	1995–96	Premier League	1	0	1	0	0	0	–		2	0
Millwall (loan)	1996–97	Second Division	6	3	0	0	0	0	–		6	3
Coventry City	1996–97	Premier League	25	5	4	2	0	0	–		29	7
Coventry City	1997–98	Premier League	34	14	5	1	1	0	–		40	15
Coventry City	1998–99	Premier League	34	9	3	3	2	0	–		39	12
Coventry City	1999-2000	Premier League	1	0	0	0	0	0	–		1	0
Coventry City	Total		94	28	12	6	3	0	–		109	34
Leeds United	1999-2000	Premier League	33	2	3	0	1	0	9 (Note: Appearances in UEFA Cup)	1	46	3
Leeds United	2000–01	Premier League	7	0	0	0	1	2	3 (Note: Appearances in UEFA Champions League)	1	11	3
Leeds United	Total		40	2	3	0	2	2	12	2	57	6
Manchester City	2000–01	Premier League	13	1	3	1	0	0	–		16	2
Manchester City	2001–02	First Division	40	20	3	1	3	5	–		46	26
Manchester City	2002–03	Premier League	16	1	1	0	2	1	–		19	2
Manchester City	2003–04	Premier League	0	0	0	0	0	0	1 (Note: Appearances in UEFA Cup)	1	1	1
Manchester City	Total		69	22	7	2	5	6	1	1	82	31
Nottingham Forest (loan)	2002–03	First Division	9	5	–		–		–		9	5
Norwich City	2003–04	First Division	36	14	1	0	0	0	–		37	14
Norwich City	2004–05	Premier League	37	6	1	0	2	1	–		40	7
Norwich City	2005–06	Championship	43	8	0	0	2	1	–		45	9
Norwich City	2006–07	Championship	40	8	4	5	0	0	–		44	13
Norwich City	2007–08	Championship	34	5	2	0	1	0	–		37	5
Norwich City	Total		190	41	8	5	5	2	–		203	48
San Jose Earthquakes	2008	Major League Soccer	14	6	–		–		–		14	6
San Jose Earthquakes	2009	Major League Soccer	14	3	–		–		–		11	3
San Jose Earthquakes	Total		28	9	–		–		–		25	9
Career total			465	115	31	13	17	10	13	3	526	141

== Honours ==
Manchester City

- Football League First Division: 2001–02

Norwich City

- Football League First Division: 2003–04

Individual

- Football League First Division Player of the Month: September 2003
- PFA Fans' Player of the Year: 2003–04 First Division
- Norwich City Player of the Season: 2004–05, 2006–07
- Norwich City Hall of Fame: 2006
- Major League Soccer Player of the Month: September 2008
- Major League Soccer Newcomer of the Year: 2008
