= Polokwane United F.C. =

Polokwane United
- Full name: Polokwane United Football Club
- Nickname: Red Lions
- Short name: PUFC, Plk Utd
- Founded: 2012
- Ground: Balican Enterprise Centre, Makotopong
- Capacity: 1 000
- Owner: Polokwane United FC (Pty) Ltd
- League: SAFA Regional League
- 2025/26: 2nd
- Website: http://www.polokwaneunitedfc.co.za

Polokwane United Football Club is a South African Association Football club based in Polokwane, South Africa, which competes in the SAFA Regional League. The academy was established in 2012 by Bally Smart, however the club started competing in the SAFA Second Division during the 2014/15 season after purchasing the rights from Rospa United FC. The club boasts its own training centre located on a 15 hectare plot in Makotopong, north east of Polokwane.

== Balican Enterprise Centre ==
Located in Makotopong, 26 kilometres outside of Polokwane, Balican Enterprise Centre has 3 full size pitches, and on-site accommodation for staff as well as academy players. The facility was opened in January 2022.

== Notable former players ==
Note: Flags indicate national team as defined under FIFA eligibility rules; some limited exceptions apply. Players may hold more than one non-FIFA nationality.

No.	Pos.	Nation	Player
—	FW	RSA	Kgaogelo Sekgota former Vitoria Setubal, Kaizer Chiefs, Stellenbosch FC and Bafana Bafana player
