= Bally Smart =

South African soccer player

Personal information
- Full name: Mapidima Smart
- Date of birth: 27 April 1989 (age 37)
- Place of birth: Polokwane, South Africa
- Height: 1.80 m (5 ft 11 in)
- Positions: Attacking midfielder; forward

Youth career
- 2003–2007: Norwich City

Senior career*
Years	Team	Apps	(Gls)
2006–2008	Norwich City	1	(0)
2007–2008	→ Milton Keynes Dons (loan)	8	(0)
2008–2010	Kerkyra	21	(0)
2010	Charlton Athletic	0	(0)
2011	Skonto Riga	8	(0)
Total		38	(0)

International career
2008–2010	South Africa U20	7	(0)

Managerial career
- 2014: Polokwane United
- * Club domestic league appearances and goals

Mapidima "Bally" Smart (born 27 April 1989 in Polokwane, Limpopo) is a South African soccer player, who last played as a winger or striker for Skonto Riga in the Latvian Higher League. Smart founded Polokwane United FC in the SAFA Second Division.

== Early career ==
Smart attended Thorpe St Andrew High School in Norwich where he studied for his GCSEs prior to joining Norwich City in 2005. He made his first team debut as a substitute against Burnley on 17 April 2007, and signed his first professional contract lasting one year on 12 May 2007.

After impressing for Norwich Reserves in a 2-1 away victory against the MK Dons, Dons manager Paul Ince decided that Smart could add extra competition for places on the wing and signed him on a three-month loan.

Bally Smart joined Greek club Kerkyra in August 2008 when his contract with Norwich City ended.

== Charlton Athletic ==
Just 24 hours before Charlton's first match of 2010–11 season, they signed Smart on a non-contract basis and he was an unused substitute for the club's opener against AFC Bournemouth. He made his debut three days later as the Addicks let a 3–0 lead slip in the League Cup at Shrewsbury Town to lose 4–3.

== Skonto Riga ==
In March 2011 Smart joined Latvian champions Skonto Riga. He made his league debut against FB Gulbene-2005 on 10 April 2011. He left the team after the season with 8 league games under his belt.

== Polokwane United ==
After his return from Latvia in 2012, Smart established Polokwane United Academy in his home town. His academy senior team competes in the South African Third Division (4th Tier) called the SAB Regional League.

== International career ==
He played seven matches for the South Africa national under-20 football team, including winning the 2008 COSAFA U-20 Cup.

== Honours ==
- Cosafa Under 20 Championship: 2008
- TrioBet Baltic League Cup: 2011
