= Kgaogelo Sekgota =

South African soccer player

Personal information
- Full name: Kgaogelo Rathete Sekgota
- Date of birth: 22 June 1997 (age 29)
- Place of birth: Seshego, South Africa
- Height: 1.71 m (5 ft 7 in)
- Position: Winger

Youth career
- 2012–2017: Polokwane United

Senior career*
Years	Team	Apps	(Gls)
2017–2019	Stumbras	30	(2)
2019–2020	Vitória	7	(0)
2020–	Bidvest Wits	12	(0)
2020–2021	Moroka Swallows	24	(3)
2021–2023	Kaizer Chiefs	42	(0)
2023–2024	Stellenbosch	12	(0)
2024–2025	Magesi Polokwane	8	(0)

International career^{‡}
2019–	South Africa	4	(0)
- * Club domestic league appearances and goals as of 22 March 2024 ‡ National team caps and goals as of 1 August 2023

Kgaogelo Rathete Sekgota (born 22 June 1997), nicknamed Kigi, is a South African soccer player who plays as a winger.

Former Kaizer Chiefs player enters a rehab alongside former Mamelodi Sundowns player Chabangu and other player.

== Club career ==
Sekgota is a youth product of the academy of Polokwane United, having joined in 2012. Sekgota began his senior career with the Lithuanian club Stumbras in 2017, and moved to Vitória in January 2019. Sekgota made his professional debut for Vitória in a 2-0 Primeira Liga loss to FC Porto on 16 February 2019.

Sekgota returned to South Africa and joined Bidvest Wits on 17 January 2020. He was announced as new Kaizer Chiefs player following the upliftment of the team transfer ban on 9 July 2021.

Kaizer Chiefs confirmed the release on Kgaogelo on 1 August 2023 to Stellenbosch FC.

Kgauhelo Sekgota has joined the betway Premiership team Siwelele F.C.

== International ==
He made his South Africa national football team debut on 4 June 2019, in a 2019 COSAFA Cup plate semi-final against Uganda, as a 73rd-minute substitute for Kamohelo Mahlatsi.

== Honours ==
Stumbras

- Lithuanian Football Cup (1): 2017

Individual

- A Lyga Young Player of the Month: May 2018
