= Jasmine Birtles =

British financial and business journalist

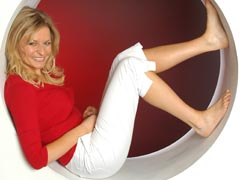
- Education: Christ's College, Cambridge
- Occupations: Author, journalist, TV presenter, entrepreneur

Jasmine Birtles is a British financial journalist, author, television and radio presenter, and entrepreneur. She is the founder of the personal finance website MoneyMagpie.

== Background ==
Birtles was brought up in Seaford, East Sussex. Her father, Peter Birtles, was a customs officer. Her mother, Jean Birtles, was a teacher and later an entrepreneur who set up Top Notch Nannies and British Doulas.

She attended Brighton & Hove High School before winning a scholarship to read English at Christ's College, Cambridge.

== Financial journalism ==
=== Broadcast media ===
Birtles presented debt documentary The Insider for Channel 4. She is a financial commentator for This Morning, Good Morning Britain, BBC News, Channel 4 News, Channel 5 News and The Wright Stuff. She is also a regular guest on radio programmes including the BBC's You and Yours, Steve Wright in the Afternoon, Radio 2, Radio 5 Live and BBC local radio and commercial stations.

=== Writing ===
Birtles has monthly money columns in Reader's Digest, Closer magazine, and Prima Baby. She has written for a number of other newspapers and magazines in the past. In addition, she has written several e-books, and almost forty physical books, including the best seller A Little Book of Abuse (2000, Boxtree) and her latest publication Beat the Banks! (2010, Vermilion). Other titles include:

- A Woman's Little Instruction Book (1995, Boxtree)
- Do You Still Miss Your Ex-Husband? Yes But My Aim Is Improving. (1996, O'Mara)
- A Parent's Little Instruction Book (1996, Boxtree)
- 1001 Knock Knock Jokes (1998, Robinson)
- The Little Book of Excuses (2001, Boxtree)
- A Girl's Best Friend Is Her Money (2002, Boxtree)
- A Little Book of More Abuse (2002, Boxtree)
- A Bit on the Side, 500 Ways to Boost your Income (2005, Piatkus)
- Money Book: Control Your Money, Control Your Life (2006, Piatkus)
- The Money Magpie (2009, Vermilion)

== Public speaking ==
As a public speaker Birtles has spoken at conferences for a wide variety of companies and organisations.

She performed a one-woman show – a humorous take on money management – at the Edinburgh Festival Fringe in 2005, called "How to be Rich Without Really Trying".

== Travel writing ==
Birtles was on the expert panel for The Sunday Times Travel Magazine, is a columnist for Family Traveler and regularly writes about travel on Moneymagpie.com.
