= Lucy Alexander =

English television presenter and property expert

- Born: Lucy Alexander; 3 April 1970 (age 56); East Dulwich, London, England
- Occupations: Presenter; property expert
- Years active: 1997–present
- Employers: Channel 4 (current); BBC (former)
- Television: Homes Under the Hammer
- Spouse: Stewart Castledine (m. 2000)
- Children: 2 (Kitty Castledine and Leo Castledine)

Lucy Alexander (born 3 April 1970) is an English television presenter and property expert. She is known for appearing on the BBC One property show Homes Under the Hammer.

== Early life ==
Alexander was born in East Dulwich, London, and has an elder sister, Sally. She graduated in drama and dance from the London Studio Centre where one of her friends was actress Tamzin Outhwaite. In 1991, Alexander appeared in the music video for Chesney Hawkes' single "The One and Only" alongside Saffron (later of Republica fame) and Hawkes himself.

== Presenting career ==
Alexander has presented on Nickelodeon as well as Channel 5's morning children's block Milkshake! and It's a Knockout. She was also one of the main presenters on the now-defunct TV Travelshop Channel that was on air from April 1998 to March 2005. She co-presented the BBC's Homes Under the Hammer alongside Martin Roberts from its launch in 2003 until 2016 when she left the programme.

In July 2016, Alexander presented the first episode of the five-part BBC documentary series Matron, Medicine and Me: 70 Years of the NHS in which she explored the current and historical medical treatment of patients with disabilities in the UK and described her own family's experience of the National Health Service after her daughter was diagnosed with transverse myelitis. In 2017, she appeared in Channel 4's Tried and Tasted: The Ultimate Shopping List. She began presenting the daytime Channel 4 series Best of Both Worlds in 2017, replacing Kirstie Allsopp. In 2017, she co-presented Lost and Found on Channel 4 daytime with Simon O'Brien.

== Personal life ==
Alexander was introduced to ex-Premier League footballer Stewart Castledine by a mutual friend, radio presenter Robin Banks. She married Castledine in 2000 in Richmond, west London The couple have two children, Kitty (an actress) and Leo (a footballer). They live in Thames Ditton, Surrey.

== Filmography ==
Year	Title	Role	Channel
1997–2000	Milkshake!	Presenter	Channel 5
1999–2001	It's a Knockout	Co-presenter	Channel 5
2003–2018	Homes Under the Hammer	Co-presenter	BBC One
2016	Matron, Medicine and Me: 70 Years of the NHS	Presenter, 1 episode	BBC One
2017	Tried and Tasted: The Ultimate Shopping List	Celebrity taster	Channel 4
2017–present	Best of Both Worlds	Presenter	Channel 4
2017–present	Lost and Found	Co-presenter	Channel 4
2017–present	Bang on Budget	Co-presenter	
2020	The Customer Is Always Right	Presenter	BBC
2023–present	A Place in the Sun	Presenter	Channel 4
