= 2006–07 Norwich City F.C. season =

Norwich City
2006–07 season
- Chairman: Roger Munby
- Manager: Nigel Worthington (5 August 2006 – 1 October 2006); Peter Grant (15 October 2006 – 6 May 2007)
- Stadium: Carrow Road
- Championship: 16th
- FA Cup: Fifth round
- League Cup: Third round
- Top goalscorer: League: Robert Earnshaw (19); All: Robert Earnshaw (19)
- Highest home attendance: 25,476 (vs. Ipswich Town, 22 April 2007)
- Lowest home attendance: 23,311 (vs. Wolverhampton Wanderers, 30 January 2007)
- Average home league attendance: 24,544
Home colours	Away colours

The 2006–07 season was Norwich City's second consecutive year in the Football League Championship after failing to gain promotion back to the Premier League at the first attempt. This article shows statistics and lists all matches that Norwich City played in the season.

== Season overview ==
=== End of the Worthington era ===
Following the departure of key players Robert Green and Leon McKenzie to West Ham United and Coventry City respectively, Norwich's lack of activity in the summer transfer window was somewhat surprising. Indeed, only one player – Lee Croft, from Manchester City, for a fee in the region of £600,000 – came into the club on a permanent basis. However, despite this and an opening day defeat, the club enjoyed a relatively good start to the season, with three consecutive home wins in the league and progress in the League Cup. This form did not last – having collected just one point from a possible twelve during September, pressure was mounting on manager Nigel Worthington. Following the 3–1 defeat at Plymouth Argyle on 23 September, joint majority shareholders Delia Smith and Michael Wynn-Jones issued a public ultimatum stating that performances must immediately improve.

In their next match on 1 October, Norwich slumped to a 4–1 defeat against Burnley at Carrow Road – a game which was televised by Sky Sports. The club announced they had parted company with Worthington just hours after the final whistle.

=== Grant appointed ===
Martin Hunter was appointed caretaker manager going into the October international break. His side came out 3–0 winners in a friendly match at King's Lynn, specially arranged for former Norwich midfielder Shaun Carey who had suffered a double fracture of his leg. During the week leading up to the meeting with Queens Park Rangers on 14 October, it emerged that former City player and West Ham coach Peter Grant was to be appointed new manager of the Canaries. He watched from the stands as his new side – still under the guidance of Hunter – drew 3–3 with QPR, conceding a stoppage-time equaliser by Martin Rowlands.

Grant's start was encouraging, winning four of his first six matches in full charge. This included beating all three sides relegated from the Premier League the previous season, as well as then league leaders, Cardiff City. However, defeat to local rivals Ipswich Town followed by a run of six defeats in nine through December and January left the club languishing in 17th, with no realistic hopes of reaching the play-offs and just four points above the relegation zone.

A key point in the season came on 27 February, in a match against Luton Town at Kenilworth Road. Norwich were behind twice in the game and defeat would have left them in real relegation danger. However, equalisers from emerging striker Chris Martin and defender Jason Shackell, followed by a vital stoppage-time winning free-kick from new signing Simon Lappin lifted City to the relative safety of 16th.

Norwich's form in the latter part of the season was very inconsistent, often winning one then losing one. The main bright spot was arguably the emergence of young striker Martin, who scored in four consecutive league games through February and March, reportedly attracting interest from Manchester United. The return of top scorer Robert Earnshaw from injury could not stop a run of three defeats from the last four games, which left City ending an overall disappointing campaign in 16th place and hoping for much better in 2007–08.

== Matches ==
Win Draw Loss

=== League ===
Round	1	2	3	4	5	6	7	8	9	10	11	12	13	14	15	16	17	18	19	20	21	22	23
Result	0–1	2–0	3–2	0–0	5–1	0–3	3–3	0–1	1–3	1–4	3–3	1–0	1–0	0–5	1–1	1–0	1–0	1–3	1–1	3–1	0–1	1–2	1–2
Position	19	10	7	6	2	4	5	10	14	17	19	15	11	17	16	13	9	12	13	12	15	15	16

Round	24	25	26	27	28	29	30	31	32	33	34	35	36	37	38	39	40	41	42	43	44	45	46
Result	2–2	0–0	1–0	1–3	1–3	0–1	2–1	1–2	1–1	3–2	3–2	1–2	0–1	1–0	1–0	0–3	2–1	1–2	2–1	0–3	1–1	0–1	2–3
Position	15	17	15	17	17	17	16	18	18	16	16	17	17	15	15	16	13	16	15	15	15	16	16

==== August ====
5 August 2006	Leeds United	1–0	Norwich City	Leeds, West Yorkshire
15:00 BST	Healy 41' (pen.)	Report		Stadium: Elland Road; Attendance: 22,417; Referee: Graham Laws

8 August 2006	Norwich City	2–0	Preston North End	Norwich, Norfolk
19:45 BST	St Ledger 56' (o.g.); Earnshaw 82'	Report	Alexander (red card) 90'	Stadium: Carrow Road; Attendance: 24,676; Referee: Phil Joslin

12 August 2006	Norwich City	3–2	Luton Town	Norwich, Norfolk
15:00 BST	Huckerby 57'; Croft 67'; Earnshaw 71'	Report	Vine 15'; Morgan 52'	Stadium: Carrow Road; Attendance: 23,863; Referee: Andy Penn

19 August 2006	Derby County	0–0	Norwich City	Derby, Derbyshire
15:00 BST		Report		Stadium: Pride Park Stadium; Attendance: 22,196; Referee: Richard Beeby

26 August 2006	Norwich City	5–1	Barnsley	Norwich, Norfolk
15:00 BST	Earnshaw 13' (pen.), 69'; Robinson 27'; Croft 57'; Huckerby 64'	Report	Kay (red card) 12'; Hayes 38'	Stadium: Carrow Road; Attendance: 24,867; Referee: Iain Williamson

==== September ====
9 September 2006	Coventry City	3–0	Norwich City	Coventry, West Midlands
15:00 BST	Birchall 12'; Kyle 63'; John 67'	Report		Stadium: Ricoh Arena; Attendance: 20,006; Referee: Jon Moss

12 September 2006	Southend United	3–3	Norwich City	Southend-on-Sea, Essex
19:45 BST	Eastwood 9'; Hammell 68'; Gower 90'	Report	Earnshaw 36', 39'; Etuhu 47'	Stadium: Roots Hall; Attendance: 11,072; Referee: Uriah Rennie

16 September 2006	Norwich City	0–1	Crystal Palace	Norwich, Norfolk
15:00 BST		Report	Kuqi 90'	Stadium: Carrow Road; Attendance: 24,618; Referee: Andy D'Urso

23 September 2006	Plymouth Argyle	3–1	Norwich City	Plymouth, Devon
15:00 BST	Doherty 14' (o.g.); Seip 47'; Norris 74'	Report	Earnshaw 90'	Stadium: Home Park; Attendance: 11,813; Referee: Jarnail Singh

==== October ====
1 October 2006	Norwich City	1–4	Burnley	Norwich, Norfolk
13:15 BST	Doherty (red card) 60'; Earnshaw 82'	Report	O'Connor 32'; Gray 45', 64'; Mahon 89'	Stadium: Carrow Road; Attendance: 24,717; Referee: Phil Crossley

14 October 2006	Queens Park Rangers	3–3	Norwich City	Shepherd's Bush, London
15:00 BST	Smith 24'; Rowlands 45', 90'	Report	Huckerby 4'; Dublin 72'; Earnshaw 84' (pen.)	Stadium: Loftus Road; Attendance: 14,793; Referee: Andre Marriner

17 October 2006	Birmingham City	0–1	Norwich City	Birmingham, West Midlands
19:45 BST		Report	Shackell 66'	Stadium: St Andrew's; Attendance: 20,537; Referee: Mike Pike

21 October 2006	Norwich City	1–0	Cardiff City	Norwich, Norfolk
15:00 BST	Etuhu 7'; McVeigh (red card) 90'	Report	Gilbert (red card) 90'	Stadium: Carrow Road; Attendance: 25,014; Referee: Anthony Bates

28 October 2006	Stoke City	5–0	Norwich City	Stoke-on-Trent, Staffordshire
15:00 BST	Hendrie 22'; Fuller 38'; Higginbotham 72'; Chadwick 79'; Russell 90'	Report	Ashdown (red card) 72'	Stadium: Britannia Stadium; Attendance: 13,444; Referee: Paul Robinson

31 October 2006	Norwich City	1–1	Colchester United	Norwich, Norfolk
19:45 GMT	Etuhu 72'	Report	Cureton 53'	Stadium: Carrow Road; Attendance: 25,065; Referee: Dermot Gallagher

==== November ====
4 November 2006	Norwich City	1–0	Sunderland	Norwich, Norfolk
15:00 GMT	Earnshaw 51'	Report		Stadium: Carrow Road; Attendance: 24,652; Referee: Mike Riley

11 November 2006	West Bromwich Albion	0–1	Norwich City	West Bromwich, West Midlands
15:00 GMT		Report	Earnshaw 57'	Stadium: The Hawthorns; Attendance: 18,718; Referee: Graham Laws

19 November 2006	Ipswich Town	3–1	Norwich City	Ipswich, Suffolk
11:30 GMT	Legwinski 40'; Haynes 77', 90'	Report	Chadwick 26'	Stadium: Portman Road; Attendance: 27,276; Referee: Trevor Kettle

25 November 2006	Norwich City	1–1	Hull City	Norwich, Norfolk
15:00 GMT	Earnshaw 72'	Report	Turner 90'	Stadium: Carrow Road; Attendance: 24,129; Referee: Gary Sutton

30 November 2006	Norwich City	3–1	Leicester City	Norwich, Norfolk
19:45 GMT	Robinson 45'; Earnshaw 59'; McAuley 90' (o.g.)	Report	McCarthy 23'	Stadium: Carrow Road; Attendance: 23,896; Referee: Darren Deadman

==== December ====
2 December 2006	Sunderland	1–0	Norwich City	Sunderland, Tyne and Wear
15:00 GMT	Murphy 76'	Report		Stadium: Stadium of Light; Attendance: 27,934; Referee: Phil Joslin

9 December 2006	Norwich City	1–2	Sheffield Wednesday	Norwich, Norfolk
15:00 GMT	Dublin 85'	Report	Camp 80' (o.g.); Burton 83'	Stadium: Carrow Road; Attendance: 24,816; Referee: Andy Woolmer

16 December 2006	Southampton	2–1	Norwich City	Southampton, Hampshire
15:00 GMT	Bale 41'; Jones 65'	Report	Earnshaw 21'	Stadium: St Mary's Stadium; Attendance: 25,919; Referee: Uriah Rennie

23 December 2006	Wolverhampton Wanderers	2–2	Norwich City	Wolverhampton, West Midlands
15:00 GMT	Henry 36'; Craddock 90'	Report	Earnshaw 10', 77'	Stadium: Molineux; Attendance: 22,910; Referee: Phil Joslin

26 December 2006	Norwich City	0–0	Southend United	Norwich, Norfolk
15:00 GMT		Report	Sodje (red card) 55'	Stadium: Carrow Road; Attendance: 25,433; Referee: Andy Hall

30 December 2006	Norwich City	1–0	Queens Park Rangers	Norwich, Norfolk
15:00 GMT	Dublin 69'	Report		Stadium: Carrow Road; Attendance: 25,113; Referee: Phil Dowd

==== January ====
1 January 2007	Crystal Palace	3–1	Norwich City	South Norwood, London
15:00 GMT	Hudson 26'; Kuqi 29'; Green 45'	Report	Earnshaw 45' (pen.)	Stadium: Selhurst Park; Attendance: 16,765; Referee: Carl Boyeson

13 January 2007	Norwich City	1–3	Plymouth Argyle	Norwich, Norfolk
15:00 GMT	Safri 45'	Report	Hayles 59'; Buzsáky 63', 75'	Stadium: Carrow Road; Attendance: 23,513; Referee: Mike Jones

30 January 2007	Norwich City	0–1	Wolverhampton Wanderers	Norwich, Norfolk
15:00 GMT		Report	Breen (red card) 55'; Kightly 59'; McNamara (yellow card) 4' (yellow-red card) 90'	Stadium: Carrow Road; Attendance: 23,311; Referee: Nigel Miller

==== February ====
3 February 2007	Norwich City	2–1	Leeds United	Norwich, Norfolk
15:00 GMT	Dublin 59'; Huckerby 78'	Report	Howson 20'	Stadium: Carrow Road; Attendance: 25,018; Referee: Kevin Friend

20 February 2007	Preston North End	2–1	Norwich City	Preston, Lancashire
19:45 GMT	Pergl 28'; Dichio 43'	Report	Shackell 62'	Stadium: Deepdale; Attendance: 11,601; Referee: Phil Dowd

24 February 2007	Norwich City	1–1	Coventry City	Norwich, Norfolk
15:00 GMT	Martin 81'	Report	Tabb 42'	Stadium: Carrow Road; Attendance: 24,220; Referee: Andy D'Urso

27 February 2007	Luton Town	2–3	Norwich City	Luton, Bedfordshire
19:45 GMT	Runström 11'; Talbot 48'	Report	Martin 26'; Shackell 73'; Lappin 90'	Stadium: Kenilworth Road; Attendance: 8,868; Referee: Uriah Rennie

==== March ====
3 March 2007	Barnsley	1–3	Norwich City	Barnsley, South Yorkshire
15:00 GMT	Ferenczi 45'	Report	Huckerby 7'; Croft 26'; Martin 41'	Stadium: Oakwell; Attendance: 11,010; Referee: Colin Webster

6 March 2007	Norwich City	1–2	Derby County	Norwich, Norfolk
19:45 GMT	Martin 52'	Report	Jones 62', 72'	Stadium: Carrow Road; Attendance: 23,462; Referee: Lee Probert

10 March 2007	Cardiff City	1–0	Norwich City	Cardiff, Wales
15:00 GMT	Parry 3'	Report		Stadium: Ninian Park; Attendance: 13,276; Referee: Graham Salisbury

13 March 2007	Norwich City	1–0	Birmingham City	Norwich, Norfolk
19:45 GMT	Huckerby 47'	Report		Stadium: Carrow Road; Attendance: 23,504; Referee: Russell Booth

17 March 2007	Norwich City	1–0	Stoke City	Norwich, Norfolk
15:00 GMT	Huckerby 31'	Report	Griffin (red card) 84'	Stadium: Carrow Road; Attendance: 24,293; Referee: Paul Taylor

31 March 2007	Colchester United	3–0	Norwich City	Colchester, Essex
15:00 BST	Cureton 52'; Garcia 64'; Iwelumo 73'	Report		Stadium: Layer Road; Attendance: 5,851; Referee: Iain Williamson

==== April ====
6 April 2007	Hull City	1–2	Norwich City	Kingston upon Hull, East Riding of Yorkshire
15:00 BST	Dawson 88'	Report	Huckerby 39'; Etuhu 55'	Stadium: KC Stadium; Attendance: 19,053; Referee: Mike Thorpe

9 April 2007	Norwich City	1–2	West Bromwich Albion	Norwich, Norfolk
15:00 BST	Etuhu 58'	Report	Sodje 73'; Kamara 90'	Stadium: Carrow Road; Attendance: 25,422; Referee: Jon Moss

14 April 2007	Leicester City	1–2	Norwich City	Leicester, Leicestershire
15:00 BST	Kenton 1'	Report	Earnshaw 74' (pen.); McAuley 78' (o.g.)	Stadium: Walkers Stadium; Attendance: 21,483; Referee: Colin Webster

17 April 2007	Burnley	3–0	Norwich City	Burnley, Lancashire
19:45 BST	Akinbiyi 30'; Gray 86'; Elliott 89'	Report		Stadium: Turf Moor; Attendance: 9,681; Referee: Martin Atkinson

22 April 2007	Norwich City	1–1	Ipswich Town	Norwich, Norfolk
12:00 BST	Etuhu 5'	Report	Wright 30'	Stadium: Carrow Road; Attendance: 25,476; Referee: Steve Tanner

28 April 2007	Norwich City	0–1	Southampton	Norwich, Norfolk
15:00 BST		Report	Best 30'	Stadium: Carrow Road; Attendance: 25,437; Referee: Lee Probert

==== May ====
6 May 2007	Sheffield Wednesday	3–2	Norwich City	Sheffield, South Yorkshire
13:00 BST	Johnson 26'; Burton 45'; Etuhu 50' (o.g.)	Report	Earnshaw 56'; Dublin 75'	Stadium: Hillsborough; Attendance: 28,287; Referee: Clive Penton

=== FA Cup ===
Round	3	4	4(R)	5
Result	4–1	1–1	3–2	0–4

6 January 2007 Round 3	Tamworth	1–4	Norwich City	Tamworth, Staffordshire
12:30 GMT	Weaver (yellow card) 20'; McGrath (yellow card) 26'; Storer 68'	Report	Dublin 40', 62'; Huckerby 42', 51'	Stadium: The Lamb Ground; Attendance: 3,165; Referee: Peter Walton

27 January 2007 Round 4	Blackpool	1–1	Norwich City	Blackpool, Lancashire
15:00 GMT	Evatt 52'	Report	Huckerby 45'; Brown (yellow card) 45' (yellow-red card) 82'	Stadium: Bloomfield Road; Attendance: 9,491; Referee: Chris Foy

13 February 2007 Round 4 (replay)	Norwich City	3–2 (a.e.t.)	Blackpool	Norwich, Norfolk
19:45 GMT	Huckerby 78', 95'; Martin 112'	Report	Jackson 37'; Barker 108'	Stadium: Carrow Road; Attendance: 19,120; Referee: Andre Marriner

17 February 2007 Round 5	Chelsea	4–0	Norwich City	Fulham, London
15:00 GMT	Wright-Phillips 39'; Drogba 51'; Essien 90'; Shevchenko 90'	Report		Stadium: Stamford Bridge; Attendance: 41,537; Referee: Rob Styles

=== League Cup ===
23 August 2006 First round	Torquay United	0–2	Norwich City	Torquay, Devon
19:45 BST		Report	McKenzie 48'; Etuhu 64'	Stadium: Plainmoor; Attendance: 3,100; Referee: Steve Tanner

19 September 2006 Second round	Rotherham United	2–4	Norwich City	Rotherham, South Yorkshire
19:45 BST	Keane 24'; Williamson 49' (pen.)	Report	Thorne 6'; Jarvis 53', 90'; Fleming 54'	Stadium: Millmoor; Attendance: 3,958; Referee: Scott Mathieson

24 October 2006 Third round	Port Vale	0–0 (a.e.t.) (3–2 p)	Norwich City	Stoke-on-Trent, Staffordshire
19:45 BST		Report		Stadium: Vale Park; Attendance: 4,518; Referee: Mark Halsey
	Penalties
	Walker (penalty missed); Constantine (penalty missed); Harsley (penalty scored); Whitaker (penalty scored); Smith (penalty scored)		(penalty missed) Robinson; (penalty scored) Thorne; (penalty missed) Shackell; (penalty missed) Eagle; (penalty scored) Dublin

== Transfers ==
=== Summer ===
==== In ====
Date	Nation	Name	Price	From
	(England)	Lee Croft	£600,000	Manchester City
20 September 2006	(England)	Dion Dublin	Free	Celtic

==== Out ====
Date	Nation	Name	Price	To
		Simon Charlton	Free	Oldham Athletic
	(England)	Robert Green	£2 million	West Ham United
		Leon McKenzie	£1 million	Coventry City

=== Winter ===
==== In ====
Date	Nation	Name	Price	From
	(England)	Luke Chadwick	Undisclosed	Stoke City
		Chris Brown	Undisclosed	Sunderland
		David Marshall	Loan	Celtic
		Mark Fotheringham	Free	Unattached
		Simon Lappin	£100,000	St Mirren

==== Out ====
Date	Nation	Name	Price	To
		Ian Henderson	Loan	Rotherham United
		Craig Fleming	Free	Rotherham United

== Players ==
=== First team squad ===
Squad at end of season.

Note: Flags indicate national team as defined under FIFA eligibility rules; some limited exceptions apply. Players may hold more than one non-FIFA nationality.

No.	Pos.	Nation	Player
1	GK	SCO	David Marshall (on loan from Celtic)
2	DF	FRA	Matthieu Louis-Jean
3	DF	ENG	Adam Drury (captain)
4	DF	ENG	Jason Shackell
6	FW	ENG	Darren Huckerby
7	MF	ENG	Lee Croft
8	FW	ENG	Peter Thorne
9	FW	ENG	Dion Dublin
10	FW	WAL	Robert Earnshaw (Note: Earnshaw was born in Mufulira, Zambia, but was raised in Wales and made his international debut for Wales in May 2002.)
11	MF	ENG	Luke Chadwick
12	GK	TTO	Tony Warner (Note: Warner was born in Liverpool, England, but also qualified to represent Trinidad and Tobago internationally and made his international debut for Trinidad and Tobago in February 2006.) (on loan from Fulham)
14	FW	ENG	Chris Brown
15	MF	MAR	Youssef Safri
16	MF	SCO	Mark Fotheringham
17	MF	ENG	Andrew Hughes
18	MF	NIR	Paul McVeigh
19	MF	SCO	Simon Lappin
20	MF	NGR	Dickson Etuhu

No.	Pos.	Nation	Player
21	GK	SCO	Paul Gallacher
22	FW	ENG	Ian Henderson
23	FW	ENG	Ryan Jarvis
24	DF	NED	Jürgen Colin
25	DF	ENG	Rossi Jarvis
26	MF	ENG	Robert Eagle
27	DF	IRL	Gary Doherty
28	MF	IRL	Michael Spillane (Note: Spillane was born in Cambridge, England, but also qualified to represent the Republic of Ireland internationally and represented them at U-17, U-18, U-19 and U-21 level.)
29	DF	ENG	Matthew Halliday
30	GK	ENG	Joe Lewis
31	DF	SCO	Andrew Cave-Brown (Note: Cave-Brown was born in Gravesend, England, but also qualified to represent Scotland internationally and represented them at U-19 and U-20 level.)
32	MF	ENG	Andrew Fisk
33	FW	SCO	Kris Renton
34	GK	ENG	Steven Arnold
35	FW	ENG	Chris Martin (Note: Martin was born in Beccles, England, and represented them at U-19 level, but also qualified to represent Scotland internationally through his father and would make his international debut for Scotland in 2014.)
36	MF	RSA	Bally Smart
37	MF	ENG	Patrick Bexfield

=== Left club during season ===
Note: Flags indicate national team as defined under FIFA eligibility rules; some limited exceptions apply. Players may hold more than one non-FIFA nationality.

No.	Pos.	Nation	Player
1	GK	ENG	Robert Green (to West Ham United)
1	GK	ENG	Jamie Ashdown (on loan from Portsmouth)
5	DF	ENG	Craig Fleming (to Rotherham United)
12	GK	ENG	Lee Camp (Note: Camp was born in Derby, England, and represented them at U-21 level, but also qualified to represent Northern Ireland internationally through his grandfather and would make his international debut for Northern Ireland in March 2011.) (on loan from Derby County)

No.	Pos.	Nation	Player
14	FW	ENG	Leon McKenzie (to Coventry City)
16	DF	SCO	Patrick Boyle (on loan from Everton)
33	MF	WAL	Carl Robinson (to Toronto FC)

== Board and staff members ==
=== Board members ===
Position	Name	Nationality
Chairman	Roger Munby	England
Vice Chairman	Barry Skipper	England
Joint Majority Shareholder	Delia Smith	England
Joint Majority Shareholder	Michael Wynn-Jones	Wales
Director	Michael Foulger	England
Chief Executive	Neil Doncaster	England

=== Coaching staff ===
Position	Staff
Manager	(Scotland) Peter Grant
Assistant manager	(England) Jim Duffy
First team coach	(England) Martin Hunter
Goalkeeping coach	(England) James Hollman
Youth coach	(England) Ricky Martin
Physiotherapist	(England) Neal Reynolds
Sports Science	(England) Dave Carolan
Club Liaison	(Scotland) Bryan Gunn

Last updated: 6 May 2007
Source: Norwich FC

== League table ==
Pos	Team	Pld	W	D	L	GF	GA	GD	Pts
14	Ipswich Town	46	18	8	20	64	59	+5	62
15	Burnley	46	15	12	19	52	49	+3	57
16	Norwich City	46	16	9	21	56	71	−15	57
17	Coventry City	46	16	8	22	47	62	−15	56
18	Queens Park Rangers	46	14	11	21	54	68	−14	53

Source: RSSSF
Rules for classification: In the Football League goals scored (F) takes precedence over goal difference (GD).
