= 2008–09 Norwich City F.C. season =

Norwich City
2008–09 season
- Chairman: Roger Munby
- Manager: Glenn Roeder (9 August–14 January); Bryan Gunn (16 January–3 May)
- Stadium: Carrow Road
- Championship: 22nd (relegated)
- FA Cup: Third round
- League Cup: First round
- Top goalscorer: League: Leroy Lita (7); All: Leroy Lita (7)
- Highest home attendance: 25,487 (vs. Watford, 13 April)
- Lowest home attendance: 23,225 (vs. Preston North End, 8 November)
- Average home league attendance: 24,542
Home colours	Away colours

The 2008–09 season was Norwich City's fourth consecutive year in the Football League Championship. On 3 May 2009, the club was relegated to play League One football for the first time in 49 years after losing 4–2 to Charlton Athletic and finishing in 22nd place. This article shows statistics and lists all matches played by the club during the season.

== Club sponsors ==
From 26 April 2008, it was announced that Flybe would be stepping down as the main club sponsor. On 29 April 2008 it was announced that Aviva would be the new shirt sponsors, having signed a three-year contract. Aviva are the parent company of Norwich Union.

== Board changes ==
On 2 September 2008, Andrew and Sharon Turner announced that they were leaving the football club's board of directors. This left a £2 million hole in Norwich City's budget. On 4 September 2008, Delia Smith and Michael Wynn Jones announced that they would be injecting £2 million, avoiding financial problems for the club.

== Board and staff members ==
=== Board members ===
Position	Staff
Chairman	(England) Roger Munby
Joint Majority Shareholder	(England) Delia Smith
Joint Majority Shareholder	(Wales) Michael Wynn-Jones
Director	(England) Michael Foulger
Chief Executive	(England) Neil Doncaster

Last updated: 3 September 2008
Source: Norwich FC

=== Coaching staff ===
Position	Staff
Manager	(Scotland) Bryan Gunn
Assistant manager	(England) Ian Butterworth
First Team coach	(England) Ian Crook
Reserve Team manager	Vacant
Goalkeeping coach	(England) Paul Crichton
Head of strength and conditioning	(England) Alan Pearson
Strengthening coach	(England) Mark Garfoot
Academy manager	(England) Ricky Martin
Under 14s coach	(England) Neil Adams
Performance analyst	(England) Liam Weeks
Physiotherapist	(England) Simon Spencer
Head of player recruitment	Vacant
Club doctor	(England) Dr Peter Harvey
Chief scout	(England) John Deehan

Last updated: 14 January 2009
Source: Norwich FC

== Players ==
=== First-team squad ===
Squad at end of season

Note: Flags indicate national team as defined under FIFA eligibility rules; some limited exceptions apply. Players may hold more than one non-FIFA nationality.

No.	Pos.	Nation	Player
1	GK	SCO	David Marshall
2	DF	ENG	Jon Otsemobor
3	DF	ENG	Adam Drury
4	DF	ENG	Jason Shackell (on loan from Wolverhampton Wanderers)
6	DF	SRB	Dejan Stefanović
7	MF	ENG	Lee Croft
8	MF	NIR	Sammy Clingan (vice-captain)
9	FW	NZL	Chris Killen (on loan from Celtic)
10	FW	ENG	Jamie Cureton
11	MF	AUS	David Carney (on loan from Sheffield United)
12	DF	IRL	Gary Doherty (captain)
13	GK	ENG	Declan Rudd
14	MF	IRL	Wes Hoolahan
17	FW	SCO	Alan Gow (on loan from Rangers)
18	FW	IRL	David Mooney (on loan from Reading)

No.	Pos.	Nation	Player
19	MF	SCO	Simon Lappin
20	MF	ENG	Darel Russell
21	DF	ENG	Ryan Bertrand (on loan from Chelsea)
22	DF	AUS	Adrian Leijer (on loan from Fulham)
23	FW	IRL	Alan Lee (on loan from Crystal Palace)
24	MF	RSA	Matty Pattison
25	GK	ENG	Stuart Nelson
27	FW	ENG	Cody McDonald
29	FW	ENG	Carl Cort (Note: Cort was born in Southwark, England, and represented them at U-21 level, but also qualified to represent Guyana internationally and would make his international debut for Guyana in 2011.)
30	FW	ENG	Korey Smith
33	FW	SCO	Kris Renton
34	MF	ENG	Tom Adeyemi
36	MF	ENG	Damon Lathrope
37	FW	ENG	Luke Daley

=== Left club during season ===
Note: Flags indicate national team as defined under FIFA eligibility rules; some limited exceptions apply. Players may hold more than one non-FIFA nationality.

No.	Pos.	Nation	Player
5	DF	SCO	John Kennedy (on loan from Celtic)
9	FW	FRA	Antoine Sibierski (on loan from Wigan Athletic)
11	MF	ENG	Luke Chadwick (to MK Dons)
15	DF	ENG	Jonathan Grounds (on loan from Middlesbrough)
16	MF	SCO	Mark Fotheringham (released)
17	MF	IRL	David Bell (Note: Bell was born in Wellingborough, England, but also qualified to represent the Republic of Ireland internationally and represented them at U-21 and B level.) (to Coventry City)

No.	Pos.	Nation	Player
18	FW	ITA	Arturo Lupoli (on loan from Fiorentina)
22	DF	ENG	Elliot Omozusi (on loan from Fulham)
23	FW	GAM	Omar Koroma (on loan from Portsmouth)
26	MF	ENG	Robert Eagle (released)
27	DF	ENG	Troy Archibald-Henville (on loan from Tottenham Hotspur)
44	FW	ENG	Leroy Lita (Note: Lita was born in Kinshasa, Zaire (now Democratic Republic of the Congo), but also qualified to represent England internationally and represented them at U-21 level.) (on loan from Reading)

== Transfers ==
=== In ===
#	Pos	Player	From	Fee	When
14	MF	(Republic of Ireland) Wes Hoolahan	Blackpool	£250,000	26 June 2008
8	MF	(Northern Ireland) Sammy Clingan	Nottingham Forest	Free	17 June 2008
6	DF	(Serbia) Dejan Stefanović	Fulham	Undisclosed	19 July 2008
17	MF	(Republic of Ireland) David Bell	Luton Town	Undisclosed	23 July 2008
25	GK	(England) Stuart Nelson	Leyton Orient	Free	Summer
29	FW	(England) Carl Cort	Unattached	Free	11 December 2008
27	FW	(England) Cody McDonald	Dartford	Undisclosed	2 February 2009

=== Out ===
#	Pos	Player	To	Fee	When
9	FW	(England) Dion Dublin	Retired		Summer
12	GK	(England) Matthew Gilks	Blackpool	Part of Hoolahan deal	26 June 2008
6	MF	(England) Darren Huckerby	San Jose Earthquakes*	Released	30 June 2008
14	DF	(Spain) Juan Velasco	Panthrakikos*	Released	30 June 2008
23	FW	(England) Ryan Jarvis	Leyton Orient*	Released	30 June 2008
25	DF	(England) Rossi Jarvis	Luton Town*	Released	30 June 2008
29	DF	(England) Matthew Halliday	Wroxham*	Released	30 June 2008
31	DF	(Scotland) Andrew Cave-Brown	Leyton Orient*	Released	30 June 2008
34	GK	(England) Steven Arnold	Grays Athletic*	Released	30 June 2008
36	MF	(South Africa) Bally Smart	Kerkyra*	Released	30 June 2008
37	DF	(England) Patrick Bexfield	Released	Released	30 June 2008
4	DF	(England) Jason Shackell	Wolverhampton Wanderers	Undisclosed	1 September 2008
11	MF	(England) Luke Chadwick	MK Dons	Free	2 January 2009
17	MF	(Republic of Ireland) David Bell	Coventry City	£500,000	30 January 2009
16	MF	(Scotland) Mark Fotheringham	Released	Released	9 April 2009
26	DF	(England) Robert Eagle	Released	Released	9 April 2009

* Indicates player joined club after being released by Norwich City

=== Loans in ===
#	Pos	Player	From	When	Until
21	DF	(England) Ryan Bertrand	Chelsea	5 July 2008	Season
22	DF	(England) Elliot Omozusi	Fulham	19 July 2008	2 February 2009
18	FW	(Italy) Arturo Lupoli	ACF Fiorentina	23 July 2008	2 February 2009
5	DF	(Scotland) John Kennedy	Celtic	27 July 2008	January 2009
23	FW	(The Gambia) Omar Koroma	Portsmouth	4 August 2008	January 2009
27	DF	(England) Troy Archibald-Henville	Tottenham Hotspur	8 August 2008	December 2008
15	DF	(England) Jonathan Grounds	Middlesbrough	1 September 2008	2 October 2008
9	MF	(France) Antoine Sibierski	Wigan Athletic	1 September 2008	18 January 2009
44	FW	(England) Leroy Lita	Reading	October 2008	December 2008
15	DF	(England) Jonathan Grounds	Middlesbrough	January 2009	March 2009
11	MF	(Australia) David Carney	Sheffield United	January 2009	May 2009
9	FW	(New Zealand) Chris Killen	Celtic	January 2009	May 2009
17	FW	(Scotland) Alan Gow	Rangers	January 2009	May 2009
22	DF	(Australia) Adrian Leijer	Fulham	2 February 2009	May 2009
18	FW	(Republic of Ireland) David Mooney	Reading	5 March 2009	End of season

=== Loans out ===
#	Pos	Player	To	When	Until
28	MF	(Republic of Ireland) Michael Spillane	Luton Town	8 August 2008	End of season
35	FW	(England) Chris Martin	Luton Town	8 August 2008	End of season
11	MF	(England) Luke Chadwick	MK Dons	1 October 2008	2 January 2009
10	FW	(England) Jamie Cureton	Barnsley	27 November 2008	February 2009

== Results by round ==
Round	1	2	3	4	5	6	7	8	9	10	11	12	13	14	15	16	17	18	19	20	21	22	23	24	25	26	27	28	29	30	31	32	33	34	35	36	37	38	39	40	41	42	43	44	45	46
Ground	A	H	A	H	A	H	H	A	A	H	A	H	H	A	A	H	H	A	H	A	H	A	A	H	A	H	A	H	H	A	A	H	A	H	H	A	A	H	H	A	H	A	H	A	H	A
Result	L	D	D	D	W	L	W	D	L	L	L	W	W	L	L	D	L	W	L	L	W	L	L	W	L	L	L	W	D	D	D	L	L	D	L	W	L	W	W	D	L	L	W	L	L	L

Updated to match(es) played on 27 April. Source: Matches
A = Away; H = Home; W = Win; D = Draw; L = Loss

== Competitions ==
Win Draw Loss

=== Pre-season ===
16 July 2008	Gorleston	1–8	Norwich City	Gorleston, Norfolk
	Thompson 14'	(Report)	Todd 1' (o.g.); Martin 3' 45'; Pattison 32'; Daley 38'; Richardson 51'; Russell 53'; Hoolahan 77'	Stadium: Emerald Park; Attendance: 1,300; Referee: Unknown

19 July 2008	Ahlafors IF (Sweden)	1–2	Norwich City	Nödinge-Nol, Sweden
	Emback 13'	(Report)	Makiese 11'; Cureton 90'	Stadium: Sjövallen Stadium; Attendance: 0 Referee: Unknown

22 July 2008	Falkenbergs FF (Sweden)	0–3	Norwich City	Falkenberg, Sweden
		(Report)	Russell 4'; Croft 42'; Cureton 55'	Stadium: Falkenbergs IP; Attendance: 0 Referee: Unknown

Date	Opponents	H/A	Result F–A	Scorers
25 July 2008	Dereham Town	A	1–2	Martin 8'
28 July 2008	Tottenham Hotspur	H	1–5	Cureton 16'
29 July 2008	King's Lynn	A	2–2	Daley 9' Renton 37'
2 August 2008	Colchester United	H	2–2	Russell 60', 63'

=== League ===
==== August ====
9 August 2008	Coventry City	2–0	Norwich City	Coventry, West Midlands
15:00 BST	Ward 48' (pen.); McKenzie 86'	(Report)		Stadium: Ricoh Arena; Attendance: 22,607; Referee: Colin Webster

16 August 2008	Norwich City	1–1	Blackpool	Norwich, Norfolk
15:00 BST	Russell 74'	(Report)	Burgess 55' (pen.)	Stadium: Carrow Road; Attendance: 23,727; Referee: Kevin Friend

23 August 2008	Cardiff City	2–2	Norwich City	Cardiff, Wales
15:00 BST	McCormack 3' 67' (pen.)	(Report)	Lupoli 77' 81'	Stadium: Ninian Park; Attendance: 18,032; Referee: Anthony Taylor

30 August 2008	Norwich City	1–1	Birmingham City	Norwich, Norfolk
15:00 BST	Russell 46'	(Report)	Larsson 40'	Stadium: Carrow Road; Attendance: 24,229; Referee: Jon Moss

==== September ====
13 September 2008	Plymouth Argyle	1–2	Norwich City	Plymouth, Devon
15:00 BST	Gallagher 90'; Timár (yellow card) 29' (yellow-red card) 34'	(Report)	Lupoli 15'; Sibierski 59'	Stadium: Home Park; Attendance: 11,185; Referee: Andy Woolmer

17 September 2008	Norwich City	0–1	Queens Park Rangers	Norwich, Norfolk
19:45 BST		(Report)	Connolly (yellow card) 11' (yellow-red card) 25'; Rowlands 33'	Stadium: Carrow Road; Attendance: 24,249; Referee: Rob Shoebridge

20 September 2008	Norwich City	1–0	Sheffield United	Norwich, Norfolk
15:00 BST	Croft 90'	(Report)		Stadium: Carrow Road; Attendance: 24,175; Referee: Phil Crossley

27 September 2008	Barnsley	0–0	Norwich City	Barnsley, South Yorkshire
15:00 BST		(Report)		Stadium: Oakwell; Attendance: 12,324; Referee: Nigel Miller

30 September 2008	Southampton	2–0	Norwich City	Southampton, Hampshire
19:45 BST	Robertson 29'; McGoldrick 64' (pen.)	(Report)	Stefanović (red card) 63'	Stadium: St Mary's Stadium; Attendance: 14,480; Referee: Richard Beeby

==== October ====
4 October 2008	Norwich City	1–2	Derby County	Norwich, Norfolk
15:00 BST	Clingan 51' (pen.)	(Report)	Hulse 26'; Carroll (red card) 50'; Ellington 85'	Stadium: Carrow Road; Attendance: 24,771; Referee: Darren Deadman

18 October 2008	Bristol City	1–0	Norwich City	Bristol
15:00 BST	McCombe 75'	(Report)		Stadium: Ashton Gate; Attendance: 16,791; Referee: Andy Hall

21 October 2008	Norwich City	5–2	Wolverhampton Wanderers	Norwich, Norfolk
19:45 BST	Ikeme 28' (o.g.); Lita 39', 58', 70'; Croft 75'	(Report)	Collins 41'; Ebanks-Blake 67' (pen.); Stearman (yellow card) 27' (yellow-red card) 69'	Stadium: Carrow Road; Attendance: 24,351; Referee: Graham Horwood

25 October 2008	Norwich City	2–1	Doncaster Rovers	Norwich, Norfolk
15:00 BST	Sibierski 83'; Lita 90'	(Report)	Stock 77' (pen.)	Stadium: Carrow Road; Attendance: 24,543; Referee: Clive Penton

28 October 2008	Derby County	3–1	Norwich City	Derby, Derbyshire
19:45 BST	Green 15'; Hulse 29'; Kaźmierczak 80'	(Report)	Kennedy 64'	Stadium: Pride Park; Attendance: 26,621; Referee: Neil Swarbrick

==== November ====
1 November 2008	Burnley	2–0	Norwich City	Burnley, Lancashire
15:00 GMT	Eagles 55', 60'	(Report)		Stadium: Turf Moor; Attendance: 11,353; Referee: Graham Laws

8 November 2008	Norwich City	2–2	Preston North End	Norwich, Norfolk
15:00 GMT	Lita 14'; Kennedy 62'; Russell (red card) 80'	(Report)	Brown 2'; Mellor 81'	Stadium: Carrow Road; Attendance: 23,225; Referee: Paul Taylor

15 November 2008	Norwich City	2–3	Swansea City	Norwich, Norfolk
15:00 GMT	Lupoli 28'; Rangel 61' (o.g.)	(Report)	Scotland 43'; Pratley 47'; Bodde 48'	Stadium: Carrow Road; Attendance: 24,262; Referee: Grant Hegley

22 November 2008	Nottingham Forest	1–2	Norwich City	Nottingham, Nottinghamshire
17:20 GMT	Anderson 38'	(Report)	Doherty (red card) 20'; Pattison 23'; Cohen 73' (o.g.)	Stadium: City Ground; Attendance: 18,566; Referee: Michael Oliver

25 November 2008	Norwich City	1–2	Crystal Palace	Norwich, Norfolk
19:45 GMT	Pattison 61'	(Report)	Beattie 27'; Oster 40'	Stadium: Carrow Road; Attendance: 24,034; Referee: Dean Whitestone

29 November 2008	Sheffield Wednesday	3–2	Norwich City	Sheffield, South Yorkshire
15:00 GMT	McMahon 51'; Clarke 55'; Tudgay 72'	(Report)	Clingan 43' (pen.); Lita 62'; Kennedy (red card) 81'	Stadium: Hillsborough; Attendance: 18,883; Referee: Anthony Bates

==== December ====
7 December 2008	Norwich City	2–0	Ipswich Town	Norwich, Norfolk
13:15 GMT	Croft 60'; Pattison 82'	(Report)		Stadium: Carrow Road; Attendance: 25,472; Referee: Lee Probert

10 December 2008	Watford	2–1	Norwich City	Watford, Hertfordshire
19:45 GMT	Priskin 16'; Smith 64'	(Report)	Croft 61'	Stadium: Vicarage Road; Attendance: 13,268; Referee: Phil Crossley

13 December 2008	Reading	2–0	Norwich City	Reading, Berkshire
15:00 GMT	S. Hunt 84'; Long 86'	(Report)		Stadium: Madejski Stadium; Attendance: 19,382; Referee: Trevor Kettle

20 December 2008	Norwich City	1–0	Charlton Athletic	Norwich, Norfolk
15:00 GMT	Lita 60'	(Report)		Stadium: Carrow Road; Attendance: 23,827; Referee: Mark Haywood

26 December 2008	Crystal Palace	3–1	Norwich City	Selhurst, London
13:00 GMT	Fonte 6' 31'; Butterfield 90'	(Report)	Doherty 18'	Stadium: Selhurst Park; Attendance: 17,180; Referee: Keith Stroud

28 December 2008	Norwich City	2–3	Nottingham Forest	Norwich, Norfolk
15:00 GMT	Breckin 73' (o.g.); Garner 90' (o.g.)	(Report)	Thornhill 17'; McGugan 30'; Earnshaw 89'	Stadium: Carrow Road; Attendance: 25,475; Referee: Jon Moss

==== January ====
10 January 2009	Sheffield United	1–0	Norwich City	Sheffield, South Yorkshire
15:00 GMT	Henderson 17'	(Report)		Stadium: Bramall Lane; Attendance: 27,267; Referee: Mark Halsey

17 January 2009	Norwich City	4–0	Barnsley	Norwich, Norfolk
15:00 GMT	Hoolahan 55'; Cureton 74'; Clingan 88' (pen.); Russell 90'	(Report)		Stadium: Carrow Road; Attendance: 24,685; Referee: Simon Hooper

27 January 2009	Norwich City	2–2	Southampton	Norwich, Norfolk
19:45 GMT	Fotheringham 40'; Hoolahan 42'	(Report)	McLaggon 57'; Saganowski 78'	Stadium: Carrow Road; Attendance: 25,271; Referee: Lee Mason

30 January 2009	Doncaster Rovers	1–1	Norwich City	Doncaster, South Yorkshire
19:45 GMT	Heffernan 23'	(Report)	Grounds 61'	Stadium: Keepmoat Stadium; Attendance: 12,384; Referee: Michael Oliver

==== February ====
3 February 2009	Wolverhampton Wanderers	3–3	Norwich City	Wolverhampton, West Midlands
19:45 GMT	Ebanks-Blake 25', 54', 56'	(Report)	Croft 32'; Cort 47'; Doherty 65'	Stadium: Molineux; Attendance: 21,654; Referee: Andy Woolmer

7 February 2009	Norwich City	1–2	Bristol City	Norwich, Norfolk
15:00 GMT	Grounds 24'; Doherty (red card) 44'	(Report)	Skuse 14'; Orr 45' (pen.)	Stadium: Carrow Road; Attendance: 24,691; Referee: Andy D'Urso

14 February 2009	Preston North End	1–0	Norwich City	Preston, Lancashire
15:00 GMT	Parkin 41'	(Report)		Stadium: Deepdale; Attendance: 12,033; Referee: Rob Shoebridge

21 February 2009	Norwich City	1–1	Burnley	Norwich, Norfolk
15:00 GMT	Cureton 20'	(Report)	Thompson 36'	Stadium: Carrow Road; Attendance: 24,363; Referee: Kevin Friend

28 February 2009	Norwich City	1–2	Coventry City	Norwich, Norfolk
15:00 GMT	Grounds 53'	(Report)	Henderson 19'; Fox 73'	Stadium: Carrow Road; Attendance: 24,450; Referee: Paul Taylor

==== March ====
3 March 2009	Queens Park Rangers	0–1	Norwich City	Shepherd's Bush, London
20:00 GMT		(Report)	Russell 68'	Stadium: Loftus Road; Attendance: 13,533; Referee: Graham Scott

7 March 2009	Blackpool	2–0	Norwich City	Blackpool, Lancashire
15:00 GMT	Ormerod 55'; Adam 74'	(Report)		Stadium: Bloomfield Road; Attendance: 7,505; Referee: Clive Oliver

10 March 2009	Norwich City	2–0	Cardiff City	Norwich, Norfolk
19:45 GMT	Mooney 49'; McDonald 90'	(Report)		Stadium: Carrow Road; Attendance: 23,706; Referee: Trevor Kettle

14 March 2009	Norwich City	1–0	Plymouth Argyle	Norwich, Norfolk
15:00 GMT	Mooney 53'	(Report)		Stadium: Carrow Road; Attendance: 25,064; Referee: Fred Graham

21 March 2009	Birmingham City	1–1	Norwich City	Birmingham, West Midlands
15:00 GMT	Jerome 38'	(Report)	Clingan 53'	Stadium: St Andrew's; Attendance: 18,159; Referee: Mark Haywood

==== April ====
4 April 2009	Norwich City	0–1	Sheffield Wednesday	Norwich, Norfolk
15:00 BST		(Report)	Johnson 48'; Spurr (yellow card) 87' (yellow-red card) 89'	Stadium: Carrow Road; Attendance: 25,385; Referee: Mick Russell

11 April 2009	Swansea City	2–1	Norwich City	Swansea, Wales
15:00 BST	Scotland 29', 50' (pen.)	(Report)	Lee 33'	Stadium: Liberty Stadium; Attendance: 15,783; Referee: Graham Salisbury

13 April 2009	Norwich City	2–0	Watford	Norwich, Norfolk
15:00 BST	Rose 15' (o.g.); Doherty 85'	(Report)		Stadium: Carrow Road; Attendance: 25,487; Referee: Steve Tanner

19 April 2009	Ipswich Town	3–2	Norwich City	Ipswich, Suffolk
12:45 BST	Quinn 24'; Giovani 62' (pen.); Stead 90'	(Report)	Mooney 16'; Clingan 90' (pen.)	Stadium: Portman Road; Attendance: 28,274; Referee: Neil Swarbrick

27 April 2009	Norwich City	0–2	Reading	Norwich, Norfolk
19:45 BST		(Report)	Long 68' 78'	Stadium: Carrow Road; Attendance: 25,041; Referee: Clive Oliver

==== May ====
3 May 2009	Charlton Athletic	4–2	Norwich City	Charlton, London
13:15 BST	Bailey 9'; Burton 25', 30', 51'	(Report)	Lee 45'; Clingan 61'	Stadium: The Valley; Attendance: 22,020; Referee: Russell Booth

=== FA Cup ===
Round	3	3(R)
Result	1–1	0–1

3 January 2009 Round 3	Charlton Athletic	1–1	Norwich City	Charlton, London
15:00 GMT	Shelvey 20'	(Report)	Lupoli 71'	Stadium: The Valley; Attendance: 12,615; Referee: Steve Tanner

13 January 2009 Round 3 (Replay)	Norwich City	0–1	Charlton Athletic	Norwich, Norfolk
19:45 GMT		(Report)	Ambrose 6'	Stadium: Carrow Road; Attendance: 13,997; Referee: Clive Oliver

=== League Cup ===
Round	1
Result	0–1

12 August 2008 Round 1	Milton Keynes Dons	1–0	Norwich City	Milton Keynes, Buckinghamshire
19:45 BST	Baldock 34'	(Report)		Stadium: Stadium:mk; Attendance: 6,261; Referee: Mike Thorpe

== League table ==
Pos	Team	Pld	W	D	L	GF	GA	GD	Pts	Promotion, qualification or relegation
20	Barnsley	46	13	13	20	45	58	−13	52	
21	Plymouth Argyle	46	13	12	21	44	57	−13	51	
22	Norwich City (R)	46	12	10	24	57	70	−13	46	Relegation to Football League One
23	Southampton (R)	46	10	15	21	46	69	−23	45 (Note: Southampton were given a ten-point deduction for breaching insolvency regulations, regarding their holding company. As they finished in the bottom three in the 2008–09 season, the points deduction was applied during the 2009–10 season in League One.)	Relegation to Football League One
24	Charlton Athletic (R)	46	8	15	23	52	74	−22	39	Relegation to Football League One

Updated to match(es) played on 3 May 2009. Source: The Football League
Rules for classification: 1) points; 2) goal difference; 3) number of goals scored.
(R) Relegated
