= Mark Fotheringham (Scottish footballer) =

Scottish footballer and coach

Personal information
- Full name: Mark McKay Fotheringham
- Date of birth: 22 October 1983 (age 43)
- Place of birth: Dundee, Scotland
- Position: Midfielder

Team information
- Current team: Celtic F.C. (first team coach)

Youth career
- Celtic

Senior career*
Years	Team	Apps	(Gls)
1999–2003	Celtic	3	(0)
2003–2005	Dundee	51	(4)
2005–2006	SC Freiburg	9	(0)
2006–2007	FC Aarau	13	(0)
2007–2009	Norwich City	69	(3)
2009	Dundee United	3	(0)
2010–2011	Anorthosis Famagusta	22	(2)
2011–2012	Livingston	11	(2)
2012	Dundee	1	(0)
2012–2013	Ross County	13	(0)
2013–2014	Notts County	28	(1)
2014–2015	Fulham	2	(0)
2016	Livingston	14	(0)
2017–2019	Cowdenbeath	0	(0)
Total		239	(12)

International career
2003–2004	Scotland U21	3	(0)

Managerial career
- 2022–2023: Huddersfield Town
- * Club domestic league appearances and goals

Mark McKay Fotheringham (born 22 October 1983) is a Scottish football coach and former player, who is a first team coach of SPFL Premiership club Celtic. He has also been head coach of Huddersfield Town.

After beginning his playing career with Celtic, he broke through to regular first team football with Dundee and appeared for the Scotland under-21 team. He subsequently played for a number of clubs in Scotland, England, Switzerland and Cyprus, including Norwich City, where he was club captain.

== Playing career ==
Fotheringham played three times for Celtic. At the time of his debut, he was the youngest player ever to play in Celtic's first team. In 2003, he moved to one of his hometown clubs, Dundee. After two years with the Dark Blues, making 59 appearances and scoring four goals in all competitions, Fotheringham moved to Germany with SC Freiburg, where he played for a season. After an unsuccessful trial with Leeds United, Fotheringham moved to FC Aarau of the Swiss Super League in 2006 but left midway through the season.

=== Norwich ===
Fotheringham began training with Rangers in January 2007 in a bid to earn a contract. However, he decided to join Norwich City on 31 January until the end of the season, with the option of a one-season extension to his contract, which was taken up, keeping him at Norwich until the summer of 2008. He made his debut for Norwich on 3 February 2007 at Carrow Road against Leeds United. The 2007–08 season began well for Fotheringham, as he scored his first goal for the club in a 5–2 League Cup win over Barnet. However, on 18 August 2007, he suffered ankle ligament damage in a match against Southampton which kept him out of action for more than two months. Fotheringham returned to the Norwich side under new Canaries manager Glenn Roeder and for a while became a permanent fixture in the side. For Norwich's home match with Plymouth Argyle on 4 December 2007, Fotheringham was made Norwich captain in the absence of Jason Shackell and was subsequently given the role on a permanent basis.

On 23 May 2008, Fotheringham agreed a new one-year deal to stay at Norwich for the 2008–09 season. It was also confirmed that he would remain as club captain, however a number of other players including Darel Russell and Gary Doherty filled this role in his periods of absence from the team during the season. In March 2009, following an incident where he stormed down the Carrow Road tunnel having been substituted in a match against Coventry City, Fotheringham was stripped of his captaincy role to be permanently replaced by Doherty. He never played for the club again, and was released in April 2009.

=== After Norwich ===
On 28 May 2009, it was announced that Espanyol were interested in signing him, and Fotheringham joined Espanyol for a week-long trial in June 2009. Derby County manager Nigel Clough then offered Fotheringham the chance to join Derby for pre-season training, which Fotheringham accepted, and joined Derby on trial in July 2009. Clough later revealed Derby would not be signing him, with Fotheringham also going on trial at Sheffield United. After clinching a January 2010 move to Cypriot side Anorthosis Famagusta, Fotheringham signed a short-term deal with hometown club Dundee United, for the three months before his move to Cyprus.

In January 2010, Mark Fotheringham signed a contract with Anorthosis Famagusta. At the end of the 2010–11 season, Manager Stanimir Stoilov then froze him out of for the pre-season training by banning him from entering the club's facilities.

Having joined Sheffield United on trial, Fotheringham signed for Livingston in October 2011. Fotheringham scored in a 2–0 win over Queen of the South on 29 October 2011 and another against Falkirk in a 4–3 loss. Then on 30 December 2011, Fotheringham had his Livingston contract extended by 28 days. He had a brief trial at Wolverhampton Wanderers in January 2012, but was not offered a contract. After the trial, Fotheringham was freed by the club in late-January.

On 7 March 2012, Fotheringham re-joined Dundee. On 30 April 2012, it was announced his contract would not be renewed.

In the summer of 2012, Fotheringham trained with German clubs 1899 Hoffenheim and VfL Wolfsburg. He signed for Scottish Premier League club Ross County in September 2012. After making thirteen appearances, Fotheringham left Ross County to join Swiss side Luzern. However, it was revealed that Fotheringham only went on trial with the club. On 23 July 2013, Fotheringham, signed for League One side Notts County following a successful trial. Fotheringham played 34 matches for County before signing for Fulham in August 2014, joining a side who had recently been relegated into the Championship after 13 seasons in the Premier League.

Fotheringham played in only three competitive matches before being released by Fulham at the end of January 2015. After almost a year without a club, he rejoined his former club Livingston in January 2016. He retired at the end of the season.

== Coaching career ==
Tomas Oral, head coach of German side Karlsruher SC, knew Fotheringham from his time as assistant to Felix Magath at Fulham. He convinced him to join him at Karlsruhe and after a few days as a guest he signed as assistant coach on 1 July 2016.

Fotheringham was appointed player-assistant manager of Scottish League Two club Cowdenbeath in 2017. He left Cowdenbeath in 2019 and returned to Germany, again as assistant coach of Oral at German 2nd tier club FC Ingolstadt 04. Ingolstadt got relegated to 3rd division, Oral and Fotheringham left the club. The following March, Ingolstadt being outside of the promotion spots, they took over again. Ingolstadt managed promotion to the 2nd tier, Oral and Fotheringham left afterwards. In March 2022 he became Magath's assistant coach at Bundesliga club Hertha BSC.

On 28 September 2022, Fotheringham was appointed head coach of EFL Championship side Huddersfield Town on a contract until June 2025, the club sitting in 23rd position at the time of his appointment. On 8 February 2023, his contract at Huddersfield was terminated, with the Terriers still in relegation trouble in 22nd place.

From March to June 2025, Fotheringham joined Championship side Swansea City as an assistant coach. Since October 2025, he is an assistant coach for Celtic.

== Managerial statistics ==
Updated 7 February 2023

Managerial record by team and tenure
Team	From	To	Record				
Team	From	To	P	W	D	L	Win %
Huddersfield Town	28 September 2022	8 February 2023	21	5	6	10	23.81
Total			21	5	6	10	23.81
