= Lee Croft =

English footballer

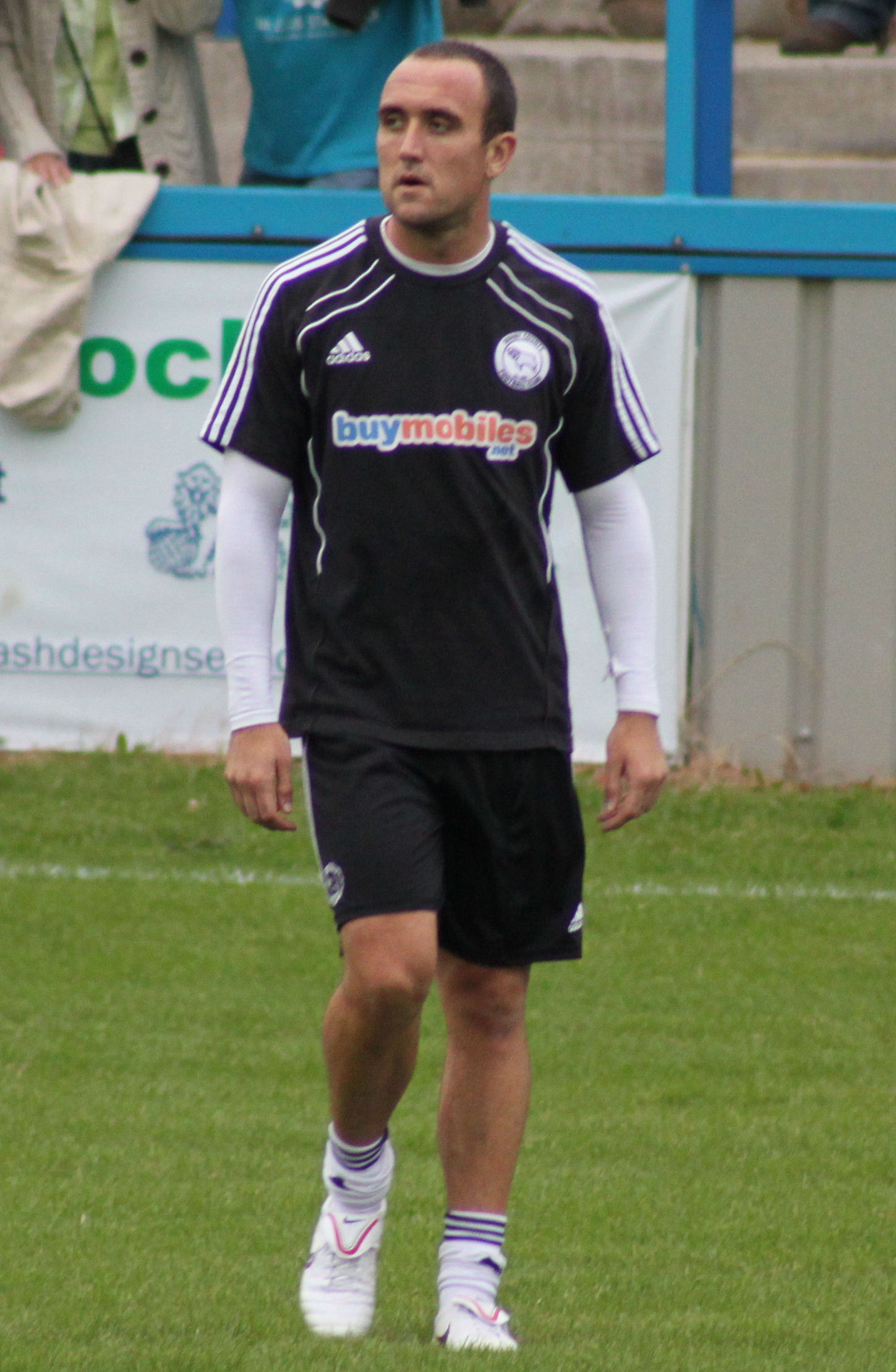
- Croft in 2011

Personal information
- Full name: Lee David Croft
- Date of birth: 21 June 1985 (age 41)
- Place of birth: Billinge Higher End, England
- Position: Winger

Youth career
- 1997–2004: Manchester City

Senior career*
| Years | Team | Apps | (Gls) |
| 2004–2006 | Manchester City | 28 | (1) |
| 2004–2005 | → Oldham Athletic (loan) | 12 | (0) |
| 2006–2009 | Norwich City | 118 | (9) |
| 2009–2013 | Derby County^{[A]} | 27 | (1) |
| 2010–2011 | → Huddersfield Town (loan) | 3 | (0) |
| 2012 | → St Johnstone (loan) | 11 | (3) |
| 2012–2013 | → Oldham Athletic (loan) | 29 | (0) |
| 2013 | Oldham Athletic | 16 | (0) |
| 2013–2015 | St Johnstone | 46 | (0) |
| 2015–2017 | Oldham Athletic | 41 | (1) |
| 2017 | Southport | 2 | (0) |
| Total | | 333 | (15) |

International career
| 2004–2005 | England U20 | 2 | (0) |
- * Club domestic league appearances and goals

Lee David Croft (born 21 June 1985) is an English former professional footballer who played as a right winger for Manchester City, Norwich City, Derby County, Huddersfield Town and Oldham Athletic. He also appears on Soccer AM as "Lee Croft, Story Teller", telling stories that end with the catch phrase "You can't handle the truth!"

== Club career ==
=== Manchester City ===
Born in Billinge Higher End, Greater Manchester, Croft began his career at Manchester City, who he joined as a 12-year-old after scout Eric Mullenden spotted him playing for junior team Garswood United. He was a talented youth player, representing England at every level up to under-20, including captaining England under-18s. Accumulating more than 40 caps in total, he is the most capped England youth player of all-time. At club level, he was part of the Manchester City youth team which reached the semi-finals of the 2003 FA Youth Cup.

He made his first team debut for City on 7 March 2005 against Bolton Wanderers, coming on as a substitute in Kevin Keegan's final game as City manager, and made a further six substitute appearances that season. In April 2005 he signed a one-year contract extension. Croft was a regular substitute at the start of the 2005–06 season. His first English Premier League start came on 31 October 2005 against Aston Villa, and his first Manchester City goal came a week later in a match against Fulham. He also started the next two matches, but this run of four matches was to be the only period Croft formed part of the Manchester City starting eleven. He was a frequent substitute in the remainder of the season, finishing with campaign with 25 appearances, 21 of these as a substitute.

==== Oldham Athletic (loan) ====
Croft turned professional aged seventeen, but did not break into the first team straight away. In November 2004 Croft went to Oldham Athletic on loan to gain first-team experience. He made his senior debut on 14 November 2004 in an FA Cup tie against Thurrock, in which he won his side a penalty. He made his League debut the following week against Barnsley. Later that month a Football League Trophy match against Hartlepool United brought his first senior goal. An FA Cup third round draw between Oldham and Manchester City raised the possibility of Croft facing his employers as an opposing player, but competition rules prevented him from doing so. Croft's loan spell lasted three months, in which he made seventeen Oldham appearances and scored two goals.

=== Norwich City ===
On 28 July 2006, Croft signed for Norwich City for a fee of £600,000 and scored his first goal for the club on 12 August 2006 in a 3–2 win against Luton at Carrow Road.

Croft continued his good start at Carrow Road with another goal in the 5–1 demolition of Barnsley on 26 August 2006 and was seen by many City fans as providing balance to the team on the right-hand side that had been missing for some time. On 28 October 2006, however, it was announced that Croft would be absent from first team duties for a possible six weeks following an injury during Norwich's 5–0 defeat at Stoke City. After making his return from injury, Croft went for a long period without scoring, but finally got on the scoresheet with a goal in another game against Barnsley at Oakwell on 3 March 2007. In the 2008–09 season, Croft became a key player for the side, and scored in the East Anglian derby match against Ipswich Town in December 2008 and went on to be voted the club's player of the season.

=== Derby County ===
==== 2009–10 season ====
After Norwich City's relegation Croft decided against signing a new contract, which alerted Derby County manager Nigel Clough. After entering into negotiations with Derby, Croft was released early from his contract by mutual consent. Croft signed for Derby on a three-year contract on 25 June 4 days after his 24th birthday. As clubs who sign players under the age of 24 who move between clubs on a free transfer have to pay compensation to the player's former club, by waiting until Croft turned 24, Derby avoided paying compensation to Norwich.

After making his debut in a 2–1 home win over Peterborough United on 8 March 2009, Croft played a part in 13 of Derby's first 15 league fixtures and scored his first for the club in a 3–0 victory over Sheffield Wednesday on 3 October 2009. However, as Derby struggled in the league Croft was unable to keep his place in the side as he struggled for form and this, alongside a hamstring injury suffered in late February 2010, saw Croft make only three appearances in the final six months of the campaign. Of Croft, Derby manager Nigel Clough said "He is on the fringe of the squad and at the moment and given the way he is sort of playing, we can't see him getting back involved. You get in the team on merit and there are quite a few players ahead of him."

==== Huddersfield Town (loan) ====
After just one appearance in 2010 for Derby, Croft moved to Huddersfield Town on a six-month loan deal ahead of the 2010–11 season. He made his Terriers debut as a substitute in the 4–2 loss against Peterborough United at London Road Stadium on 21 August 2010 before making his full debut in a 5–1 defeat at Everton in the League Cup. He got his first ever career red card on 9 October away at Colchester United, but Huddersfield still managed to win 3–0, and inflict a first league defeat of the season on their opponents. Ahead of his return to his parent club, Derby manager Nigel Clough stated that Croft had no future at Pride Park and that he would look at loaning the player out again in 2011. On the expiration of Croft's initial loan spell at Huddersfield he returned to Derby, Terriers boss Lee Clark stating "Sadly, Lee Croft couldn't achieve the levels I know he can offer. I saw him during my last season with Norwich when he was in sensational form, but during his time with us he wasn't able to reproduce that.

==== Return to Derby ====
After failing to make an appearance for the club during the 2010–11 season, Croft vowed to regain his place in the first team ahead of the 2011–12 season after encouragement from Rams manager Nigel Clough. On 19 July 2011, he was allocated squad number 22, he was not allocated one during the 2010–11 season. He was in the starting line-up as Derby's first three games of the season (Championship victories over Birmingham City and Watford sandwiching a League Cup home defeat to Shrewsbury Town) before dropping to the bench for the club's subsequent fixtures and then eventually losing his place in the matchday 16 as Clough switched to a formation without wide players.

==== St Johnstone (loan) ====
As a result, Croft loaned out to Scottish Premier League side St Johnstone until the end of 2011–12 season in January 2012. Croft scored 3 times in 13 appearances for St Johnstone before being ruled out for the rest of the season with a hamstring injury on 15 April 2012, Croft had hoped to return to the team despite being ruled out for six weeks. On 16 April 2012, Croft was told that he was allowed to leave Derby in the summer, despite having a year left on his contract with St Johnstone expressing an interest to extend Croft's stay McDiarmid Park. Derby manager Nigel Clough, Croft was looking at his options for the 2012–13 season and was formally transfer listed on 22 May 2012.

==== Oldham Athletic (loan) and departure from Derby ====
On 3 July 2012, Croft joined former club Oldham Athletic on loan until the end of the 2012–13 season. Croft featured 35 times during his second loan spell at Latics with 34 start, which made him an ever-present however his loan spell was ended on 31 January 2013, when Derby County terminated Croft's contract five months early. Croft's last appearance during this spell was in a 3–2 win against Liverpool in the FA Cup 4th round.

=== Oldham Athletic ===
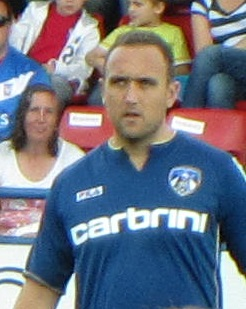
Croft playing for Oldham Athletic in 2012

Croft re-signed for Oldham Athletic on 1 February 2013, on a contract until the end of the 2012–13 season.

On 24 May 2013, it was announced that Croft was to leave Latics having rejected a contract offered by the club. This was at the end of a successful season-long spell which resulted in Croft winning the Fans Player of the Season award and playing in 53 out of Oldham's 54 games in all competitions.

=== St Johnstone ===
In November 2013, Croft signed a contract with St Johnstone to the end of the 2013–14 season. He came on as a substitute as they won the 2014 Scottish Cup Final.

=== Oldham Athletic ===
Croft rejoined Oldham Athletic on a one-year contract on 1 July 2015. On 17 July 2016, manager Steve Robinson confirmed that Croft remained with the club on a monthly contract.

=== Southport ===
In September 2017 Croft joined Southport on a short-term contract.

== International career ==
Croft has represented England at Under-16, Under-17, Under-18, Under-19 and Under-20 youth international levels, including captaining the Under-18 team. He played in the 2003 FIFA World Youth Championship, making two appearances for England Under-20 as they finished bottom of Group D.

== Personal life ==
On 14 October 2012, Croft was the subject of a police investigation after he was accused of racially abusing a black ball boy. He admitted he "spoke inappropriately" to the boy and apologised. However, it quickly transpired that "there was no accusation whatsoever from the ball boy of racist abuse", who accepted Croft's apology; Croft said that the false allegations (from those who did not witness the incident) damaged anti-racism efforts.

== Career statistics ==
Appearances and goals by club, season and competition
| Club | Season | League | | | FA Cup | | League Cup | | Other | | Total | |
| Club | Season | Division | Apps | Goals | Apps | Goals | Apps | Goals | Apps | Goals | Apps | Goals |
|---|---|---|---|---|---|---|---|---|---|---|---|---|
| Manchester City (loan) | 2004–05 | Premier League | 7 | 0 | — | | 0 | 0 | — | | 7 | 0 |
| Manchester City (loan) | 2005–06 | Premier League | 21 | 1 | 3 | 0 | 1 | 0 | — | | 25 | 1 |
| Manchester City (loan) | Total | | 28 | 1 | 3 | 0 | 1 | 0 | 0 | 0 | 32 | 1 |
| Oldham Athletic (loan) | 2004–05 | League One | 12 | 0 | 3 | 1 | 0 | 0 | 2 (Note: Appearances in the Football League Trophy) | 1 | 17 | 2 |
| Norwich City | 2006–07 | Championship | 36 | 3 | 4 | 0 | 1 | 0 | — | | 41 | 3 |
| Norwich City | 2007–08 | Championship | 41 | 1 | 2 | 0 | 3 | 0 | — | | 46 | 1 |
| Norwich City | 2008–09 | Championship | 41 | 5 | 2 | 0 | 1 | 0 | — | | 44 | 5 |
| Norwich City | Total | | 118 | 9 | 8 | 0 | 5 | 0 | 0 | 0 | 131 | 9 |
| Derby County | 2009–10 | Championship | 19 | 1 | 1 | 0 | 1 | 0 | — | | 21 | 1 |
| Derby County | 2010–11 | Championship | 0 | 0 | 0 | 0 | 0 | 0 | — | | 0 | 0 |
| Derby County | 2011–12 | Championship | 9 | 0 | 0 | 0 | 1 | 0 | — | | 10 | 0 |
| Derby County | Total | | 28 | 1 | 1 | 0 | 2 | 0 | 0 | 0 | 31 | 1 |
| Huddersfield Town (loan) | 2010–11 | League One | 3 | 0 | 0 | 0 | 1 | 0 | 2 | 0 | 6 | 0 |
| St Johnstone (loan) | 2011–11 | Scottish Premier League | 11 | 3 | 2 | 0 | 0 | 0 | — | | 13 | 3 |
| Oldham Athletic (loan) | 2012–13 | League One | 29 | 0 | 4 | 0 | 1 | 0 | 1 | 0 | 35 | 0 |
| Oldham Athletic | 2012–13 | League One | 16 | 0 | 2 | 0 | 0 | 0 | 0 | 0 | 18 | 0 |
| St Johnstone | 2013–14 | Scottish Premier League | 19 | 0 | 3 | 0 | 1 | 0 | 0 | 0 | 23 | 0 |
| St Johnstone | 2014–15 | Scottish Premiership | 27 | 0 | 1 | 0 | 2 | 0 | 4 (Note: Appearances in the Europa League) | 0 | 34 | 0 |
| St Johnstone | Total | | 46 | 0 | 4 | 0 | 3 | 0 | 4 | 0 | 57 | 0 |
| Oldham Athletic | 2015–16 | League One | 21 | 1 | 1 | 0 | 1 | 0 | 1 | 0 | 24 | 1 |
| Oldham Athletic | 2016–17 | League One | 20 | 0 | 1 | 0 | 1 | 0 | 5 (Note: Appearances in the EFL Trophy) | 1 | 27 | 1 |
| Oldham Athletic | Total | | 41 | 1 | 2 | 0 | 2 | 0 | 6 | 1 | 51 | 2 |
| Southport | 2017–18 | National League North | 2 | 0 | 0 | 0 | — | | 0 | 0 | 2 | 0 |
| Career total | | | 334 | 15 | 29 | 1 | 15 | 0 | 15 | 2 | 393 | 18 |

== Notes ==
A. Soccerbase's stats for the match between Nottingham Forest and Derby County on 17 September 2011 count a substitute appearance made by Croft, however it should be credited to Russell Anderson. Therefore, until and unless they correct it, he should have one less appearance for Derby than given on his Soccerbase page.
