= Sammy Clingan =

Northern Irish footballer (born 1984)

Personal information
- Full name: Samuel Gary Clingan
- Date of birth: 13 January 1984 (age 42)
- Place of birth: Belfast, Northern Ireland
- Position: Defensive midfielder

Youth career
- 2001–2003: Wolverhampton Wanderers

Senior career*
Years	Team	Apps	(Gls)
2003–2006	Wolverhampton Wanderers	0	(0)
2004–2005	→ Chesterfield (loan)	15	(2)
2005–2006	→ Chesterfield (loan)	21	(1)
2006–2008	Nottingham Forest	85	(1)
2008–2009	Norwich City	40	(6)
2009–2012	Coventry City	98	(7)
2012–2013	Doncaster Rovers	6	(0)
2013–2015	Kilmarnock	56	(5)
2016–2017	Linfield	11	(1)
2017–2020	Glenavon	49	(17)
2020–2021	Glenavon	2	(0)
Total		383	(40)

International career
	Northern Ireland U15	12	(0)
	Northern Ireland U16	2	(0)
	Northern Ireland U19	6	(1)
2003–2006	Northern Ireland U21	11	(1)
2004	Northern Ireland U23	1	(0)
2006–2014	Northern Ireland	39	(0)
- * Club domestic league appearances and goals

Samuel Gary Clingan (born 13 January 1984) is a Northern Irish former international footballer who played as a defensive midfielder.

== Early life ==
Born in Belfast, Northern Ireland, Clingan spoke about growing up in a city, where The Troubles was around, saying: "The Peace Process has changed the lives of all of us. We used to come home from school and hear someone had been shot dead or injured every day. I would never have changed my childhood for anything, I had the most amazing time growing up with my friends, but it was a difficult time for anyone in Northern Ireland."

Growing up in Northern Ireland, Clingan spoke out about tragedy on the death of his family members, whom he was close to. Clingan was the only boy in the family and has two sisters.

== Club career ==
=== Wolverhampton Wanderers ===
Clingan began playing football when he joined Corpus Christi. Clingan joined Wolverhampton Wanderers when he was fourteen years old. However, Clingan had to wait until 16 to move to England, where he officially join the club in August 2001 as a youth trainee. Clingan progressed through the club's youth system, where he was regarded as a "great prospect" and even captained the reserve side in the 2003–04 season, resulting in him awarded the Young Player of the Year. Clingan appeared in the first team for the first time as an unused substitute in Wolverhampton Wanderers’ first team, in a 3–3 draw against Sheffield United on 26 April 2003. Clingan appeared twice as an unused substitute during their Premier League campaign of 2003–04 season but he never broke into the first team and was the club's captain for the reserve side instead.

On 7 October 2004, Clingan was loaned out to Chesterfield for a month to gain first-team experience. He made his debut for the club, starting the whole game, in a 1–0 loss against Hull City on 10 October 2004. Ten days later on 20 October 2004, Clingan scored his first professional goal, in a 4–0 win against Stockport County. His second goal for the club came on 30 October 2004 came against Sheffield Wednesday when he scored a 30-yard screamer, in a 2–2 draw. After the match, manager Roy McFarland praised his performance, saying: "It was a great goal. Sammy is capable of that, he does it in training on a regular basis, so it's no surprise to us. But when he it happens on a Saturday in front of a big crowd it's a tremendous goal." Clingan went on to have his loan spell with Chesterfield extended before returning to his parent club in January. By the time he returned to his parent club, Clingan made fifteen appearances and scoring two times in all competitions. Following his loan spell at Chesterfield ended, he appeared twice as an unused substitute at Wolverhampton Wanderers for the rest of the 2004–0 season.

Ahead of the 2005–06 season, Clingan continued to be linked with a move to Mansfield Town, Doncaster Rovers and Chesterfield, all three bids were rejected by Wolverhampton Wanderers. Despite suffering a broken wrist during Wolves’ pre–season tour, he eventually join Chesterfield for the second time on loan on deadline day until January. On 2 September 2005, Clingan made his debut for the club, coming on as a 60th-minute substitute, in a 2–0 loss against Bradford City. However, his playing time came from the substitute bench, prompting manager McFarland informing him to be patient. But on 26 November 2005, he scored his first goal for Chesterfield in his second spell for the club, in a 1–1 draw against Blackpool. By the time Clingan made twenty–two appearances and scoring once for Chesterfield. Between October 2004 and January 2006, he played 29 times for the Spireites and scored three goals – quickly becoming a fans' favourite.

=== Nottingham Forest ===
In early 2006, Nottingham Forest confirmed their interest in Clingan. The original deal fell through because of the existing loan deal with Chesterfield, but when his loan period ended on 15 January, Forest made a second bid. He joined the club on 23 January 2006 for an undisclosed fee.

On 27 January 2006, Clingan made his debut for Nottingham Forest, starting the whole game, in a 2–0 defeat to Barnsley. He contributed both goals for the club against Yeovil Town and Hartlepool United on 17 April 2006 and 22 April 2006 respectively. Having become a first team regular in the second half of the 2005–06 season, Clingan made fifteen appearances in all competitions.

Ahead of the 2006–07 season, Clingan was linked with a move to Birmingham City and Ipswich Town but the move never materialised. He had been a regular in the Nottingham Forest side in 2006–07 season, playing in the midfield position. His international commitment at Northern Ireland caused him to miss two matches. In a match against Oldham Athletic on 1 January 2007, Clingan received a straight red card in the 21st minute for a foul on Will Haining, in a 5–0 loss. After the match, he served a three match suspension. On 31 January 2007, Clingan made his return from suspension, coming on as a second-half substitute, in a 3–0 loss against Chelsea in the fourth round of the FA Cup. However, he sustained a broken ankle during a 5–1 victory over Huddersfield Town in early March 2007, sidelining him for the rest of the 2006–07 season. Despite this, Clingan made thirty–four appearances in all competitions.

At the start of the 2007–08 season, Clingan returned fit for the next campaign and started the whole game, in a 0–0 draw against AFC Bournemouth in the first game of the season. Following his return from injury, he regained his first team place, playing in the midfield position. He got his first goal for the Reds after 22 months and 59 games, with a 22-yard free-kick in a 2–0 win over Crewe on 24 November 2007. However, Clingan received a straight red card in the 53rd minute for a foul on Jake Robinson, as Nottingham Forest won 2–0 against Brighton & Hove Albion on 7 December 2007. After serving a three match suspension, he returned to the starting line–up, in a 0–0 draw against Oldham Athletic on 26 December 2007. Clingan later helped the club beat Yeovil Town 3–2 win on the last game of the season, a win that saw Nottingham Forest gain automatic promotion to the Championship. At the end of the 2007–08 season, he made forty–six appearances and scoring once in all competitions.

With his contract expiring at the end of the 2007–08 season, Clingan was offered a new deal by Nottingham Forest. Manager Colin Calderwood expressed his optimism that the player would sign a new contract with the club. However, Clingan rejected the offer from Forest amid interest from Championship rivals Queens Park Rangers, Ipswich Town and Norwich City.

=== Norwich City ===
On 17 June 2008, Clingan agreed to join Norwich City when his Forest contract expired. He signed a two-year deal and was Glenn Roeder's first summer signing.

He made his debut for the club, starting a match and conceded a penalty, in a 2–0 loss against Coventry City in the opening game of the season. After the match, Clingan felt that there was no contact when he gave away the penalty. However, Clingan suffered "a knock on his shin" while on international duty match against Scotland, which angered manager Roeder. But he recovered and returned to the starting line–up against Cardiff City on 23 August 2008. However, Clingan, once again, suffered a shoulder injury while on international duty and was eventually out for a month.

On 4 October 2008, he returned to the starting line–up against Derby County and scored his first goal for Norwich City, in a 2–1 loss. Clingan provided three assists against his former club, Wolverhampton Wanderers and Doncaster Rovers on 21 October 2008 and 25 October 2008 respectively. His goal against Wolverhampton Wanderers was later was given as an own goal to Carl Ikeme. Since returning from injury, he regained his first team place from injury, playing in the midfield position. At times, Clingan played in the defence as cover of absent players, as well as, given the captaincy. He was given a playmaking role, with manager Roeder, saying: "Clingan gets things going so they got round him". In the January transfer window, he was linked to Premier League clubs, with the player eventually revealing that Fulham were the frontrunner, trying to sign him, but the move never materialised.

After missing one match due to an injury, Clingan made his return to the starting line–up, in a 1–1 draw against Burnley on 21 February 2009. On 6 March 2009, he was soon appointed as Norwich City's vice-captain, following Gary Doherty promotion as captain. His performance throughout March earned him March's Championship Player of the Month nomination but lost out to Robbie Blake. During the 2008–09 season, Clingan became the club's established penalty taker, scoring all four spot-kicks he took. His other goals were an impressive free-kick in a 1–1 draw away to Birmingham City and a similar effort in the final day 4–2 defeat to Charlton Athletic which sealed the club's relegation to League One. At the end of the 2008–09 season, he went on to make forty–three appearances and scoring six times in all competitions.

Following Norwich City's relegation, Clingan requested a transfer and was sold to Coventry City. Manager Bryan Gunn acknowledged that it would be difficult to keep him. He proclaimed that he wanted to play in the Premier League and Coventry City offered him the best chance of getting there. Unfortunately for him, the club didn't make it to the Premier League. Two years later, however, Norwich City did secure promotion to the Premier League and Clingan was mercilessly taunted with cries of "Sammy Clingan, it could have been you." by Norwich City Supporters when the two clubs met on the last day of the championship season. He later admitted regretting leaving Norwich for Coventry City.

=== Coventry City ===
After a protracted transfer saga in the summer transfer window, Clingan signed for Coventry City on 24 July 2009, signing a three-year deal for an undisclosed fee.

He made his debut for the club, starting the whole game, in a 2–1 win against Ipswich Town in the opening game of the season. Since joining Coventry City, Clingan quickly became a first team regular, playing in the midfield position. On 19 September 2009, he scored his first goal for the club, in a 3–2 loss against Preston North End. Clingan scored against Watford and Leicester City on 29 September 2009 and 3 October 2009 respectively. However, during the match, he suffered a toe injury and was out for six weeks. Two months later, on 12 December 2009, Clingan made his return from injury, coming on as an 88th-minute substitute, in a 3–2 win over Peterborough United. However, his return was short–lived when he suffered Achilles injury while training and was out for two matches. On 28 December 2009, Clingan made his return from injury, coming on as a 70th-minute substitute, in a 2–0 loss against Nottingham Forest. On 9 January 2010, he scored his third goal for Coventry City, in a 3–1 win against Barnsley. However, during a match against Portsmouth in the third round of the FA Cup replay on 12 January 2010, Clingan suffered a concussion and was substituted at half-time, as the club lost 2–1 and was eliminated from the tournament. But he soon recovered from his concussion. Following his return from his injuries, Clingan regained his first team place, playing in the midfield position despite suffering a virus that saw him out for one match along the way. On 27 February 2010, he scored his sixth goal of the season, in a 2–1 win against Scunthorpe United. However, on the last game of the season against Watford, Clingan suffered a knee injury and was substituted at half-time, much to the delight of the Coventry City supporters, as the club loss 4–0. He was nominated for Coventry City's Player of the Year award but lost out to Keiren Westwood. In his first season at the club, Clingan made thirty–six appearances and scoring five times in all competitions.

At the start of the 2010–11 season, Clingan appeared as an unused substitute in the first four matches of the season. On Deadline day, he was linked with a move to Leicester City, but Coventry City rejected the move. Following the last three games since the opening game of the season, Clingan said his first team place is difficult in the starting line-up, under manager Aidy Boothroyd. Eventually, he soon force his way to the starting eleven that convinced Boothroyd to include him in a starting line-up. Clingan then set up a goal against Swansea City and Bristol City on 14 September 2010 and 18 September 2010 respectively. However, in a match against Nottingham Forest on 9 November 2010, he suffered a knee injury and was substituted in the 70th-minute, as the club loss 2–1. After the match, Clingan was out for two months. On 23 January 2011, he made his return from injury, coming on as a 66th-minute substitute, in a 2–1 loss against Queens Park Rangers. However, his return was short–lived when Clingan suffered an injury that kept him out four matches. On 27 February 2011, Clingan returned to the first team, coming on as a 64th-minute substitute, in a 1–1 draw against Leicester City. Since returning from injury, he regained his first team place for the remainder of the season, playing in the midfield position and even captained the side at one point. His return form led manager Andy Thorn praising Clingan's performance, comparing his playing style to a "Premier League player." At the end of the 2010–11 season, he made twenty–eight appearances in all competitions.

Ahead of the 2011–12 season, Clingan was named as Coventry City's club captain following the departures of Keiren Westwood, Marlon King and Aron Gunnarson. Throughout the summer transfer window, he was linked with a move to Leeds United but remained at the club in the end. Since the start of the 2011–12 season, he continued to be a first team regular, playing in the midfield position. On 29 October 2011, Clingan scored his first goal of the season, in a 1–1 draw against Doncaster Rovers. After the match, he announced his desire to stay at Coventry City and the contract negotiations has started. However, Clingan suffered a knee injury that kept him out for the rest of the year. On 14 January 2012, he made his return from injury, starting the whole game, in a 1–0 loss against Derby County. On 4 February 2012, Clingan scored his second goal of the season, in a 3–2 loss against Ipswich Town. In a follow–up match against Reading, however, he suffered a groin injury and was substituted in the 59th minute, as the club loss 2–0. After the match, Clingan was out for three matches with a groin injury. On 3 March 2012, he made his return from injury, coming on as a 71st-minute substitute, against Leicester City and missed the penalty, as Coventry City loss 2–0. After the match, caretaker manager Steve Harrison refused to blame him for missing the penalty. Clingan, himself, said the club is determined to bounce back from recent losses. Since returning from injury, he regained his first team place for the next nine league matches. At the end of the 2011–12 season, Clingan made thirty–six appearances and scoring two times in all competitions.

On 2 May 2012, it was reported that Clingan rejected a new contract from Coventry City. It was confirmed on 10 May 2012 that he was released by the club when his contract ran out at the end of the 2011–2012 season. Reflecting on his time at the Sky Blues, Clingan said: "To be honest with you, I really enjoyed my time at Coventry. I know I got offered a new three year contract and I was weighing up my options at the time and wondering what to do. And I look back and think, in hindsight, that I probably should have stayed there because I loved my time there and loved living in Leamington."

=== Doncaster Rovers ===
Clingan was without a club for the first few months of the 2012–13 season despite being linked with a move to Brighton & Hove Albion, Charlton and Millwall. He then went on trial at Doncaster Rovers. His trial led to him signing for the club on a month by month contract on 26 October 2012.

The next day on 27 October 2012, Clingan made his debut for the club, coming on as an 83rd-minute substitute, in a 2–0 win away against Notts County. However, his first team opportunities at Doncaster Rovers hard to come by and despite this, he expressed his desire to stay at the club. Clingan made his last appearance for the club – against his former club, Coventry City – on 15 December 2012, where he received a mixed reception from the Sky Blues fans. Coventry City fans welcomed the decision to release Clingan when he was released seven months ago. On 27 December 2012, it was confirmed that Clingan would not be offered an extension to his contract and would leave Doncaster Rovers. By the time he left the club, Clingan made nine appearances in all competitions.

=== Kilmarnock ===
On 29 January 2013, Clingan signed an 18-month contract with Scottish Premier League side Kilmarnock. Upon joining the club, he was joined by compatriot Rory McKeown and manager Kenny Shiels.

On 9 February 2013, Clingan made his debut for Kilmarnock, coming on as a second–half substitute, in a 2–0 win against Motherwell. Four days later on 13 February 2013, he made his first start, in a 1–1 draw against Inverness Caledonian Thistle. On 27 February 2013, Clingan scored his first goal for the club, in a 2–2 draw against Hibernian. Since joining Kilmarnock, he quickly became a first team regular for the remainder of the season. Two months later on 11 May 2013, Clingan scored his second goal of the season, in a 3–2 win over Dundee. At the end of the 2012–13 season, he made fourteen appearances and scoring two times in his first half of the season.

At the start of the 2013–14 season, however, Clingan was a suffered a knee injury after a challenge during a friendly match against Carlisle United, resulting in his substitution. After the match, it was announced that he would be out for six weeks. After being sidelined for six weeks, Clingan made his return to the first team against Celtic on 28 September 2013, starting the match, where he scored from a free-kick, in a 5–2 loss. Despite the loss, Clingan said he will never forget the first time he played at Celtic Park. Since returning from injury, Clingan struggled to regain his first team, as he alternated between starting eleven and substitute bench. However, in a match against St Mirren on 1 March 2014, he suffered a knee injury and was substituted in the 26th minute, as Kilmarnock loss 2–0. After the match, it was announced that Clingan would be out for six weeks. On 19 April 2014, he made his return from injury, coming on as an 86th-minute substitute, in a 2–1 loss against Partick Thistle. On the last game of the season against Hibernian, Clingan came on as a 34th-minute substitute, and helped the club to win 1–0 to secure their status next season. At the end of the 2013–14 season, he made eighteen appearances and scoring once in all competitions. Following this, Clingan signed a 12 months contract with Kilmarnock.

At the start of the 2014–15 season, Clingan scored his first goal of the season, in a 2–0 win over Motherwell on 22 August 2014. He continued to regain his first team place, playing in the midfield position in the first half of the season. However, in a match against St Johnstone on 13 December 2014, Clingan suffered a knee injury and was substituted in the 56th minute, as Kilmarnock loss 1–0. After the match, he was out for five weeks. On 21 January 2015, Clingan made his first team return, starting the whole game, in a 1–0 loss against Dundee. Three weeks later on 14 February 2015, he scored the last-minute goal, in a 3–2 win over Dundee United. However, Clingan suffered a tendonitis that kept him out for two months. On 12 April 2015, he made his return from injury, starting the match and played 85 minutes before being substituted, in a 2–1 loss against Aberdeen. However, his return was short–lived when Clingan suffered a knee injury and was substituted at half-time, as the club loss 2–1 against Motherwell on 8 May 2015. At the end of the 2014–15 season, he went on to make twenty–seven appearances and scoring two times in all competitions.

Despite keen on staying at Kilmarnock, Clingan was released by the club upon expiry of his contract.

=== Linfield ===
Clingan went without a club for the entire 2015–16 season after his move to Gillingham collapsed. He made his return to football by signing for NIFL Premiership side Linfield, linking up with former Northern Ireland colleagues David Healy and Roy Carroll. It was later revealed that he joined the club on a part-time basis.

Clingan made his debut for Linfield, starting the whole game, in a 4–0 win against Glenavon on 20 August 2016. Since making his debut for the club, he became a first team regular, playing in the midfield position. On 13 October 2016, Clingan scored his first goal for Linfield, in a 4–0 win against Ballinamallard United. However, in a match against Glenavon on 5 November 2016, he suffered a knee injury and was substituted at half-time, in a 2–2 draw. Following this, Clingan never played for the club again, due to a knee injury. Despite this, his involvement in the first team earned him a league medal after Linfield won the league. At the end of the 2016–17 season, he made thirteen appearances and scoring once in all competitions.

On 9 May 2017, Clingan left Linfield at the end of the 2016–17 season.

=== Glenavon ===
On 8 August 2017, it was announced that Clingan had signed for Glenavon on a one-year contract.

He made his debut for the club, starting the whole game, in a 1–1 draw against Warrenpoint Town in the opening game of the season. A week later on 19 August 2017, Clingan scored his goal for Glenavon, in a 6–1 win over Ballymena United. Since joining the club, Clingan quickly became a first team regular, playing in the midfield position. He also became Glenavon's expertise from set pieces and penalties proved invaluable, scoring 12 goals. Clingan went on a goalscoring streak when he scored penalties against Carrick Rangers, Coleraine and Glentoran on 28 October 2017, 4 November 2017 and 14 November 2017 respectively. Clingan, once again, went on a goalscoring streak when he scored penalties against Crusaders and Dungannon Swifts (twice) on 16 December 2017 and 23 December 2017 respectively. Clingan, once again, went on a goalscoring streak when he scored penalties against Ballymena United and Cliftonville on 31 December 2017 and 13 January 2018 respectively. For his performance, he was named Player of the Month for December. However, Clingan missed some matches due to fears from the club that he could suffer an injury on artificial pitch. He later helped Glenavon earn a European qualification next season after drawing 0–0 against Coleraine on the last game of the season. At the end of the 2017–18 season, Clingan went on to make thirty–two appearances and scoring twelve times in all competitions. Following this, he signed a one–year contract extension with the club.

At the start of the 2018–19 season, however, Clingan found himself out of the starting eleven, due to a calf injury and not able to play in the artificial pitch. On 10 November 2018, he made his return from injury, coming on as a 67th-minute substitute, in a 1–1 draw against Warrenpoint Town. After missing one match due to an injury, Clingan returned to the starting line–up and scored his first goal of the season, in a 3–1 win against Ards on 24 November 2018. However, he continued to remain out of the first team, due to injuries and not able to play in the artificial pitch. Clingan then scored against Crusaders and Coleraine on 6 April 2019 and 13 April 2019. Much of the following season, however, was disrupted by a long-term injury layoff which limited Clingan to just 10 appearances. Although Glenavon bettered the previous season's points total, a loss to Glentoran in the Europa League Playoff semi-final meant that they did not secure European football. On 23 June 2019, Clingan agreed another one-year deal at Glenavon, to the end of the 2019–20 season.

In the opening game of the 2019–20 season, Clingan scored his first goal of the season, scoring from a direct free kick, in a 1–1 draw against Glentoran. After missing one match due to not being able to play in the artificial pitch, he scored on his return, in a 2–0 win against Warrenpoint Town on 17 August 2019. However, Clingan was out for three months, due to suffering from an injury and personal reasons. On 10 December 2019, he made his return from injury, starting the whole game, and set up the only goal of the game, in a 1–0 win against Carrick Rangers. After missing one match due to not being able to play in the artificial pitch, Clingan returned to the starting eleven and set up a goal, in a 2–1 loss against Ballymena United on 21 December 2019. On 25 January 2020, he scored his third goal of the season, in an 8–1 loss against Linfield. However, his return was short–lived when Clingan suffered Achilles injury that saw him out for the rest of the 2019–20 season. The season was curtailed because of the COVID-19 pandemic. At the end of the 2019–20 season, he went on to make thirteen appearances and scoring three times in all competitions.

Clingan's contract with Glenavon expired at the end of the 2019–20 season, but he ruled out retirement from professional football yet and hope to play for the club. On 18 October 2020, Clingan signed a contract with Glenavon until the end of the 2020–21 season. The next day on 19 December 2020, he made his return to the first team, coming on as a 76th-minute substitute, in a 2–1 win against Warrenpoint Town. In a follow–up match against Linfield, Clingan started the whole match, in a 2–1 loss, in what turns out to be his last appearance as a professional footballer. Following this, he sustained a knee injury which required surgery, effectively ending his playing career. Clingan went on to make two appearances in all competitions and retired at the end of the 2020–21 NIFL Premiership season.

== International career ==
=== Youth levels ===
Clingan has represented Northern Ireland at under-17 and under-19 levels.

On 28 March 2003, Clingan made his Northern Ireland U21 debut, coming on as a substitute, in a 2–0 loss against Armenia. He made his first start for the under-21 side, in a 1–0 loss against Ukraine on 5 September 2003. Between 2003 and 2006, Clingan appeared several times for Northern Ireland U21. On 19 August 2004, he captained the under-21 side for the first time, starting the whole game, in a 0–0 draw against Switzerland U21. Following this, Clingan captained a number of matches for Northern Ireland U21 for the next two years. On 6 February 2006, he scored his first goal for the under-21 side, in a 1–0 win against Israel. Clingan gained eleven Northern Ireland under-21 caps and scoring once and even captained the side.

In April 2004, Clingan made his only appearance for Northern Ireland U23, in a 0–0 draw against Serbia and Montenegro U23.

=== Senior levels ===
His progress at Northern Ireland U21 led to suggestions that Clingan earn a call–up from the Northern Ireland’s senior team. In May 2006, he was officially called up to the senior team for the first time by manager Lawrie Sanchez. Clingan made his senior debut at the Giants Stadium in New York City against Uruguay during Northern Ireland's two-game tour of the US in May 2006. Following his debut for the senior team, he hoped to make more appearances for Northern Ireland. In a follow–up match against Romania, he played his first 90 minutes for the senior team, and was "a star performer" despite a 2–0 loss. His early start to his Northern Ireland's international career led Clingan to be nicknamed "Northern Ireland’s David Beckham", a nickname he took positively.

Clingan made his first competitive senior cap came in the 3–0 home defeat by Iceland on 2 September 2006, in the first match of the UEFA Euro 2008 qualifying campaign. His free kick set up David Healy's second goal in the 3–2 home victory over Spain on 6 September 2006. He has remained a fixture in the side since then, missing only two matches in the campaign through injury. Following his return from injury, Clingan started all the remaining six matches of the campaign, as Northern Ireland unsuccessfully qualified for the UEFA Euro 2008. Despite this, he was named man of the match by the BBC commentary team in the 2–1 home victory over Denmark on 17 November 2007.

Following Northern Ireland's failure to qualify for the UEFA Euro 2008, Clingan played five times for the national side throughout 2008. On 19 November 2008, he captained Northern Ireland for the first time when Maik Taylor was substituted at half-time, in a 2–0 loss against Hungary. Clingan played five times for the national side throughout 2009. On 1 April 2009, he set up a goal for Warren Feeney, who scored the only goal of the game, in a 1–0 win against Slovenia. After an eleven-month absent, Clingan was called up to Northern Ireland squad on 30 July 2010. On 11 August 2010, he made his only appearance of 2010 for the national side, starting a match and played 64 minutes before being substituted, in a 2–0 loss against Montenegro.

In March 2011, Clingan was called up to the Northern Ireland's squad and started two matches against Serbia and Slovenia. In May 2011, he was called up to the senior team squad for the 2011 Nations Cup and played once against Republic of Ireland. Following this, Clingan had to withdraw from the tournament after suffering from a hip injury. He later made three more appearances for Northern Ireland later in 2011. Clingan played only two times for the senior team, including being a captain in a 6–1 loss against Netherlands on 2 June 2012.

In March 2013, Clingan was called up to the Northern Ireland squad and played his first match for the senior team in nine months, in a 2–0 loss against Israel on 26 March 2013. He later made two more appearances for Northern Ireland later in 2013. Clingan acknowledged that he was overlooked by manager Michael O'Neill, due to not being a free agent but soon won his place in the national team.

Six months later, Clingan was called up to the Northern Ireland squad for the match against Uruguay and Chile. He went on to start two matches for the senior team. On 14 November 2014, Clingan came on as a 63rd-minute substitute, in a 2–0 loss against Romania, in what turns out to be his last appearance for Northern Ireland.

== Personal life ==
Clingan said about his education as a Corpus Christi student: "I was never the best at exams when I was in education, I didn’t really know how to study, and yet it is something I have had to do loads of for my fire exams." He said his idol was Neil Lennon and was happy to be his teammate when he first joined Nottingham Forest in 2007. Clingan is married to his wife, Corrine, a Scottish citizen, and together, they have two children. They first met while he was playing for Kilmarnock and were married in 2018.

Following the end of his football career, Clingan moved to Glasgow, Scotland, where he was a trained to be a firefighter. In April 2023, Clingan graduated from the training programme with the Scottish Fire and Rescue Service. He currently works for Scottish Fire and Rescue Service. Clingan stated that working as a firefighter helped him overcomes his self-doubt.

Outside of football, Clingan plays golf as his hobby. He explained his reason on playing golf, saying: "I took up golf because it got me out of the flat, and it was outdoors, competitive, a sport - but it wasn't football, so I could switch off. You can get frustrated with golf fairly easily, but I just try to enjoy it."

== Career statistics ==
As of match played on 30 December 2018.

Club	Season	League			Cup		League Cup		Other		Total	
Club	Season	Division	Apps	Goals	Apps	Goals	Apps	Goals	Apps	Goals	Apps	Goals
Wolverhampton Wanderers	2001–02	Division 1	0	0	0	0	0	0	—		0	0
Wolverhampton Wanderers	2002–03	Division 1	0	0	0	0	0	0	—		0	0
Wolverhampton Wanderers	2003–04	Premier League	0	0	0	0	0	0	—		0	0
Wolverhampton Wanderers	2004–05	Championship	0	0	0	0	0	0	—		0	0
Wolverhampton Wanderers	2005–06	Championship	0	0	0	0	0	0	—		0	0
Wolverhampton Wanderers	Totals		0	0	0	0	0	0	—		0	0
Chesterfield (loan)	2004–05	League One	15	2	0	0	0	0	—		15	2
Chesterfield (loan)	2005–06	League One	21	1	0	0	0	0	1 (Note: Appearances in the FA Trophy.)	0	22	1
Nottingham Forest	2005–06	League One	15	0	0	0	0	0	—		15	0
Nottingham Forest	2006–07	League One	28	0	3	0	1	0	3	0	35	0
Nottingham Forest	2007–08	League One	42	1	2	0	2	0	—		46	1
Nottingham Forest	Totals		85	1	5	0	3	0	3	0	96	1
Norwich City	2008–09	Championship	40	6	2	0	1	0	—		43	6
Coventry City	2009–10	Championship	34	5	2	0	0	0	—		36	5
Coventry City	2010–11	Championship	28	0	0	0	0	0	—		28	0
Coventry City	2011–12	Championship	36	2	0	0	0	0	—		36	2
Coventry City	Totals		98	7	2	0	0	0	—		100	7
Doncaster Rovers	2012–13	League One	6	0	2	0	0	0	1	0	9	0
Kilmarnock	2012–13	Scottish Premier League	14	2	1	0	0	0	—		15	2
Kilmarnock	2013–14	Scottish Premiership	18	1	0	0	0	0	—		18	1
Kilmarnock	2014–15	Scottish Premiership	24	2	1	0	2	0	—		27	2
Kilmarnock	Totals		56	5	2	0	2	0	—		60	5
Linfield	2016–17	NIFL Premiership	11	1	0	0	1	0	1 (Note: Appearances in the Scottish Challenge Cup.)	0	13	1
Glenavon	2017–18	NIFL Premiership	30	12	2	0	0	0	—		32	12
Glenavon	2018–19	NIFL Premiership	10	3	0	0	0	0	—		10	3
Glenavon	2019–20	NIFL Premiership	9	2	0	0	0	0	—		9	2
Totals			49	17	2	0	0	0	—		51	17
Career totals			381	40	15	0	7	0	6	0	409	40

== Honours ==
Nottingham Forest

- Football League One runner-up: 2007-08

Linfield

- NIFL Premiership: 2016–17
