= Omar Koroma =

Gambian footballer

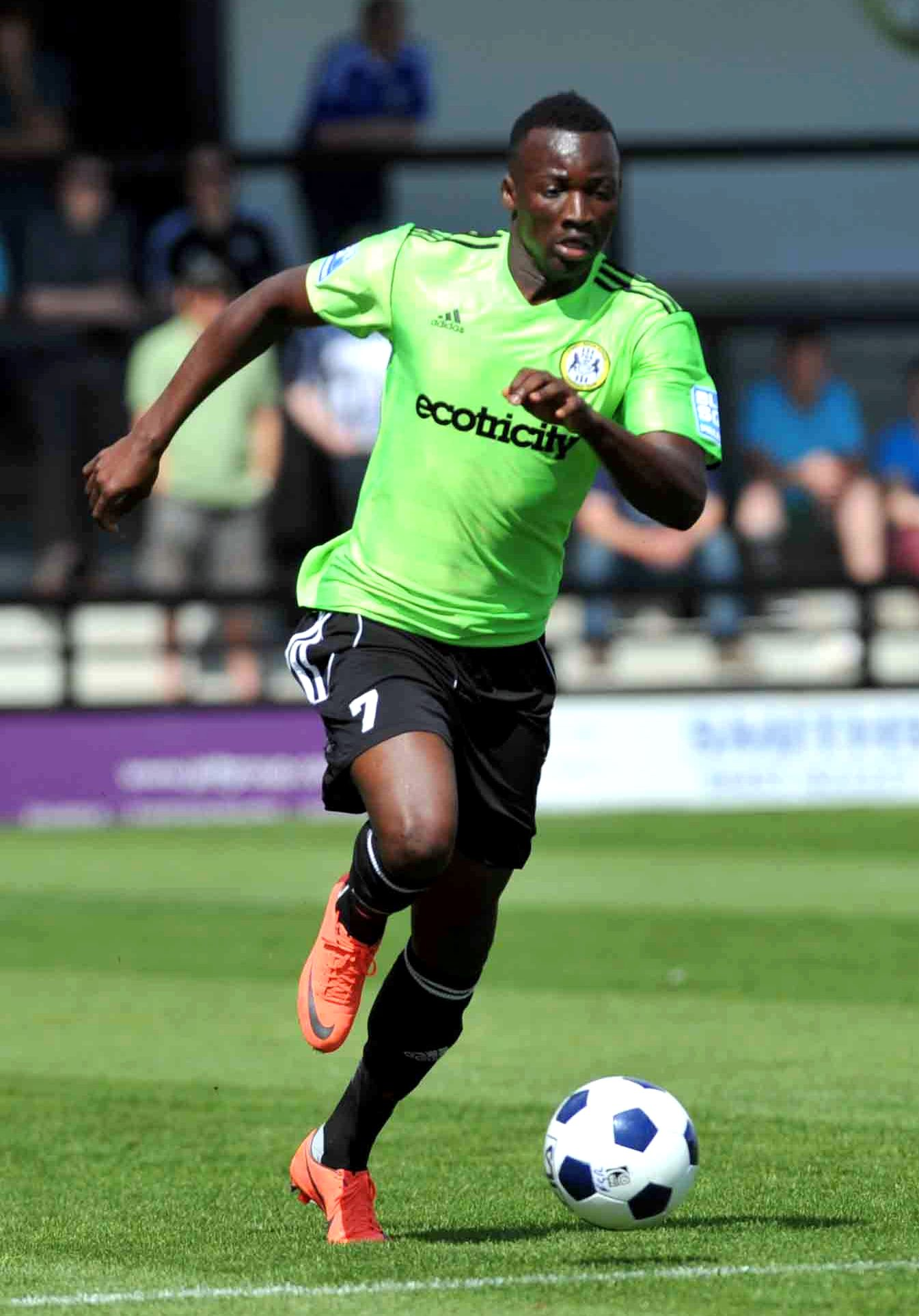
- Omar Koroma playing for Forest Green Rovers in the 2012/13 season.

Personal information
- Full name: Omar Alieu Koroma
- Date of birth: 22 October 1989 (age 37)
- Place of birth: Banjul, Gambia
- Height: 1.78 m (5 ft 10 in)
- Position: Striker

Team information
- Current team: Worthing

Senior career*
Years	Team	Apps	(Gls)
2007–2008	Banjul Hawks		
2008–2010	Portsmouth	0	(0)
2008–2009	→ Norwich City (loan)	5	(0)
2012–2014	Forest Green Rovers	20	(0)
2014–2015	Dulwich Hamlet	7	(2)
2015–2016	Thróttur Reykjavík	18	(2)
2016–2017	Wealdstone	22	(4)
2017	→ Dulwich Hamlet (loan)	2	(0)
2017–2018	Dulwich Hamlet	4	(0)
2017–2020	Carshalton Athletic	20	(13)
2020–	Worthing	1	(1)

International career^{‡}
2008	Gambia	4	(0)
- * Club domestic league appearances and goals as of 2137, 5 May 2018 (UTC ‡ National team caps and goals as of 12:00, 24 March 2017 (UTC)

Omar Alieu Koroma (born 22 October 1989) is a Gambian footballer who plays for Worthing. He is also a former Gambia international.

He is the first ever Gambian to be signed by an English Premier League club. He plays as a striker and has previously represented Portsmouth, Norwich City and Forest Green Rovers.

== Career ==
Koroma trained with English side Watford in October 2007. He impressed, but was unable to secure a contract due to work permit issues. He also trained with Southampton but again, could not sign a professional contract with the club.

In July 2008 he was then offered a two-week trial with Premier League side Portsmouth, featuring in some of their pre-season friendlies and impressing enough to be offered a contract. He was eligible for a work permit after recently marrying a British partner.

On 4 August 2008 Portsmouth manager Harry Redknapp confirmed that a two-year contract for Koroma had been completed from Banjul Hawks, and confirmed that the striker would be spending the 2008–09 season at then Championship side Norwich City on loan. He made his debut for Norwich on 9 August 2008 as a substitute in a 2–0 defeat at Coventry City.

In late December 2008, Koroma suffered a serious ankle injury, which necessitated surgery. This took place in January 2009, leaving him a likely recovery period of 10 to 12 weeks. He returned to Portsmouth at the end of January but was released the following summer.

He trialed in Denmark, trialing for Brondby IF. He impressed Brondby and Denmark striker Peter Madsen when on trial with the Danish Superliga club.

He then went on trial with Conference Premier side Forest Green Rovers. He scored a brace in a 2–1 reserve team victory over Crawley Town on 23 April 2012. After a lengthy trial period with Forest Green, Koroma agreed to a three-year contract at the club in May 2012.

He made his Forest Green debut on 27 August 2012 although was sent off after 34 minutes in an away game against Kidderminster Harriers. After making 20 league appearances for the club, he left on 23 January 2014 by mutual consent.

Following a brief trial, he joined Dulwich Hamlet of the Isthmian League Premier Division in November 2014, making his debut against Maidstone United on 12 November 2014, before going on to score his first goal for the club in a 3–1 away win at Harrow Borough on 22 November 2014.

After leaving Dulwich Hamlet, he moved to Iceland to sign for Thróttur Reykjavík on a one-year contract with an option to extend.

On 1 March 2016, he signed a one-year contract with FC Kyzyl-Zhar SK after impressing in their test matches.

At the start of the 2016–17 season Koroma joined Wealdstone of the National League South, scoring on his debut in a 2-1 league victory over Margate on 13 August 2016.

On 24 March 2017, Koroma re-joined Dulwich Hamlet on loan for the remainder of the 2016-17 Isthmian League Premier season, with the signing being funded by the club's 12th Man Scheme.

Following his release by Wealdstone Koroma rejoined Dulwich Hamlet during the 2017–18 season, spending a spell on loan at Carshalton Athletic during which he scored five goals in three games, before returning to the Hamlet and making his third debut for the club, starting in a 1–3 loss away to Enfield Town in the Isthmian League Premier Division on 3 December 2017.

== International ==
In September 2008, Koroma was called up to the Gambia senior squad for the 2010 FIFA World Cup qualifiers against Liberia and Senegal, making his international debut as a late substitute for Njogu Demba as the Gambian's ran out 3–0 victors.
