= Jason Shackell =

English footballer (born 1983)

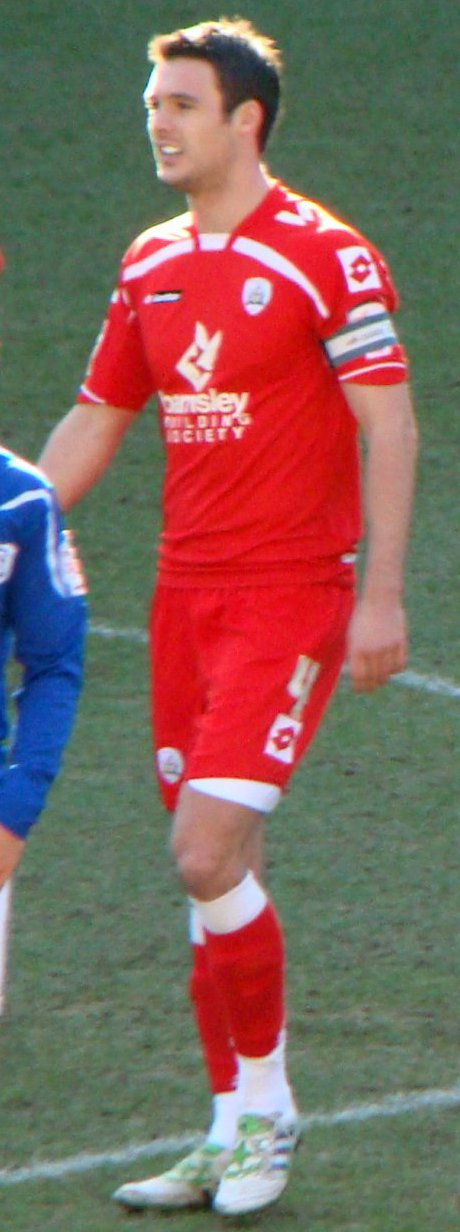
- Shackell playing for Barnsley in 2011

Personal information
- Full name: Jason Philip Shackell
- Date of birth: 27 September 1983 (age 43)
- Place of birth: Stevenage, England
- Height: 6 ft 4 in (1.93 m)
- Position: Defender

Youth career
- 2000–2003: Norwich City

Senior career*
Years	Team	Apps	(Gls)
2003–2008	Norwich City	119	(3)
2008–2010	Wolverhampton Wanderers	12	(0)
2009	→ Norwich City (loan)	14	(0)
2009–2010	→ Doncaster Rovers (loan)	21	(1)
2010–2011	Barnsley	44	(3)
2011–2012	Derby County	46	(1)
2012–2015	Burnley	128	(4)
2015–2018	Derby County	54	(1)
2018	→ Millwall (loan)	7	(0)
2018–2020	Lincoln City	60	(6)
Total		505	(19)

Managerial career
- 2025–: Austin FC II
- * Club domestic league appearances and goals

Jason Philip Shackell (born 27 September 1983) is an English former professional footballer who primarily played as a centre-back, notably for Norwich City and Derby County.

Born in Stevenage, he joined Norwich City in 2000. He made his senior debut in 2003 and spent seven seasons with Norwich before moving to Wolverhampton Wanderers in 2008. After loan spells with Norwich City and Doncaster Rovers, he moved to Barnsley where he won the Player of the Season award in his only year there. He also spent one year at Derby County before signing with Burnley in 2012. With Burnley, he earned promotion to the Premier League as runners-up whilst also being named in the PFA Team of the Year for the Championship. After three seasons with Burnley, Shackell returned to Derby County for a second spell. He spent three seasons with Derby County and had a loan spell with Millwall before departing in 2018. He subsequently signed for Lincoln City, where he won League Two and was named in the division's PFA Team of the Year. He left Lincoln in 2020.

== Career ==
=== Norwich City ===
Shackell is a product of the Norwich City youth academy, which he joined in 2000. He made his senior debut for on 5 April 2003 in a 2–1 defeat at Derby County, when he played at left-back following an injury to Adam Drury. Although Shackell's preferred – and best – position is central defender, his first few appearances were at left-back when Drury was either injured or suspended.

He added further experience the following season as Norwich won the First Division championship. He did not feature in the club's opening months in the Premier League but returned to the team in February 2005 in a home game against Manchester City. Although Norwich lost 3–2, he acquitted himself well and kept his place in the centre of defence for the remainder of the season, but could not prevent relegation.

The scene was set for Shackell to continue his progress in the 2005–06 season. However, a pre-season illness and a subsequent run of injuries caused him to miss four months of the campaign. However, the season brought him his first goal for Norwich on 17 October 2006 against Birmingham City, proving to be the winning goal. He scored two further goals that season, against Preston North End and Luton Town, but the club were unable to challenge for an immediate return to the top division.

After undergoing another ankle operation during Summer 2006, he returned to be a virtual ever-present in the next season. With the arrival of Peter Grant as manager during the season, Shackell was appointed captain at the start of the 2007–08 season. In October 2007, he signed a new contract that was due to have kept him at Carrow Road until 2010. However, his season took a downturn in December, when new manager Glenn Roeder relieved him of the captaincy.

Shackell lost his place in the Norwich side at the start of the new season after several new defensive signings arrived. On 1 September 2008, he left for fellow Championship side Wolverhampton Wanderers, signing a four-year deal for an undisclosed fee believed to be around £1 million.

=== Wolverhampton Wanderers ===
However, he was unable to stake a regular place in the Molineux side, and fell down the pecking order. He returned to his former club Norwich on 10 February 2009, for the remainder of the 2008–09 season. The season proved unique for Shackell as he was relegated from the Championship, but having played 12 games earlier in the season for Wolves before his loan to Norwich, had done enough to earn a winners' medal when Wolves won the Championship on 25 April.

Out of favour at Wolves, he spent the 2009–10 season on loan at Championship side Doncaster Rovers.

=== Barnsley ===
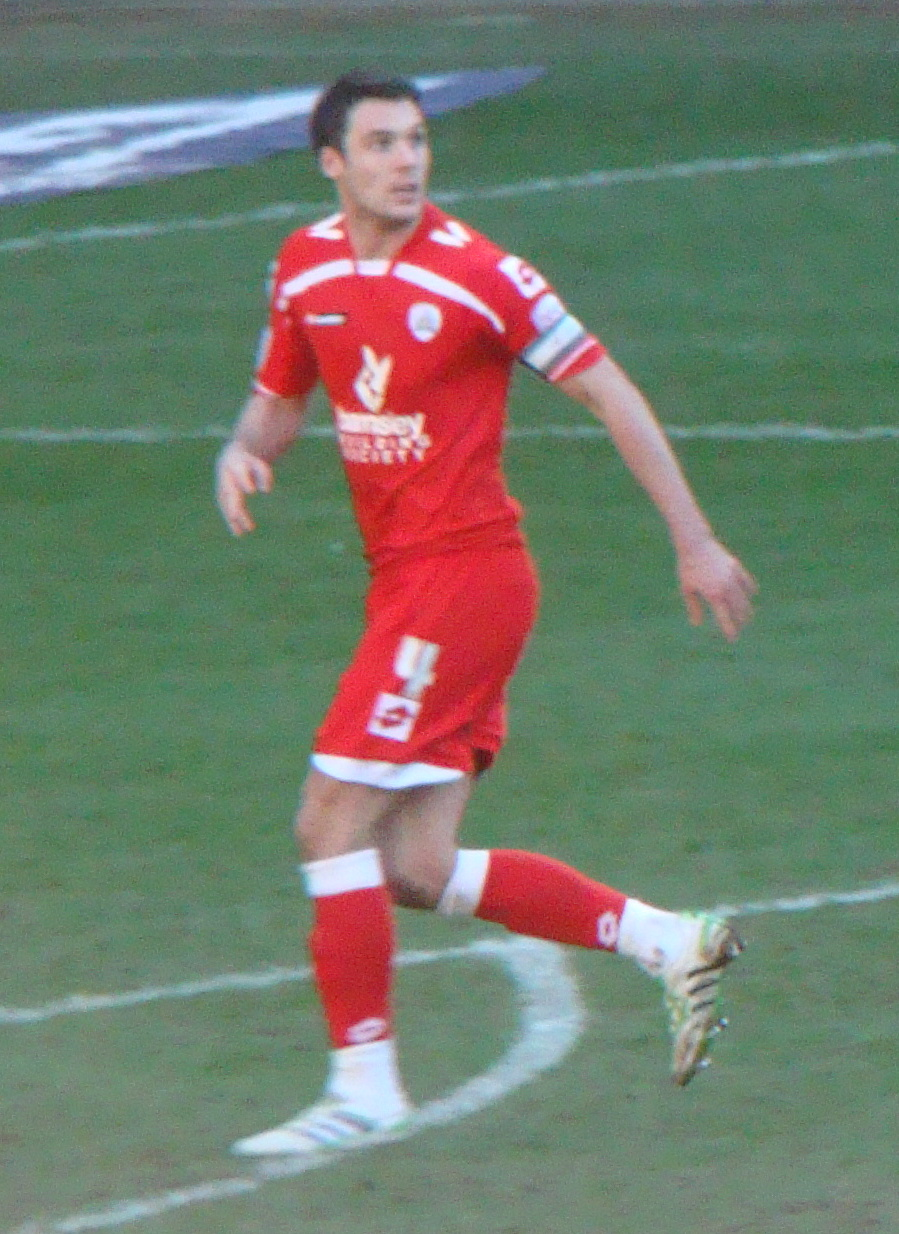
Shackell playing for Barnsley in 2011

On 12 May 2010 he left Molineux, when he signed for Barnsley for an undisclosed fee. He served as club captain, replacing Stephen Foster. Shackell's first goal for the club came in the 2–0 victory over Middlesbrough at Oakwell on 28 August 2010. Shackell headed home to give Barnsley a 1–0 lead in the 28th minute.

After a set of impressive performances during the 2010–11 season (where he won the Player of The Year award), Shackell was heavily linked with transfer moves away from Oakwell, with fellow Championship clubs Burnley, Derby County, Hull City, Portsmouth and newly promoted Premier League outfit Swansea City all interested in the player.

Derby County had two bids for the player rejected, the second bid estimated to be in the region of £700,000. Derby went back with an improved bid on 15 June 2011, believed to be £750k up front, potentially rising to £1m. This bid was accepted by Barnsley on 17 June 2011.

=== Derby County ===
Shackell was confirmed as a Derby County player on 21 June 2011, signing a three-year contract. Shackell scored on his league debut for Derby County in a 2–1 win over Birmingham City on the opening day of the 2011–12 season, heading the equaliser from a Ben Davies freekick. He was also the Rams captain for the game and won man of the match. Derby enjoyed their best start to a season for over 100 years, winning their first four games, and were in the top three going into the start of the October international break. Shackell proved key to this success and his early season form was rewarded with a nomination for the Championship Player of the Month award, though he eventually lost out to Middlesbrough's Matthew Bates. Shackell started every game of the 2011–12 season at centre back and became captain of the team after Shaun Barker was injured in the 1–0 win against Nottingham Forest in mid-March 2012. Shackell was an ever-present in the Derby County side during the season and was runner up in the fans Player of the Season vote. In the close season, Derby rejected four bids from three clubs, with Burnley and Cardiff City thought to have made bids On 4 July 2012, it was confirmed the Derby County had accepted a bid for Shackell from Burnley believed to be £1.1 million.

=== Burnley ===
On 5 July 2012, Shackell signed for fellow Championship side Burnley for an undisclosed fee, on a four-year contract. Later that month it was announced that he would become Burnley captain.

In March 2014 he scored the equalizing goal for Burnley in a 2–1 win over fierce East Lancashire rivals Blackburn at Ewood Park. The result was the Claret's first win in that fixture in 35 years. Shackell went on to guide Burnley to 2nd in the Championship and promotion to the Premier League in the 2013–14 season.

=== Return to Derby County ===
On 23 July 2015, Shackell rejoined his former club Derby on a three-year deal for an undisclosed fee, understood to be around £3 million.

On 25 January 2018, Shackell joined fellow Championship side Millwall on loan for the remainder of the 2017–18 season.

He was released by Derby at the end of the 2017–18 season.

=== Lincoln City ===
On 9 August 2018, Shackell joined Lincoln City. Shackell came on to make his debut as a substitute against Swindon Town on 11 August before making his first start for the imps on 14 August, and scored in the 5th minute. On 28 May 2020, it was announced Shackell will leave the club at the end of his current contract.

== Managerial career ==
On November 21, 2025, Shackell was names the second ever head coach of Austin FC II. Shackell started his coaching career with the Austin FC Academy after concluding his playing career. Initially he served as a U–15 assistant coach before taking over the role of coach for the U–16 team, finally earning his promotion to the second team.

== Career statistics ==
Appearances and goals by club, season and competition
Club	Season	League			FA Cup		League Cup		Other		Total	
Club	Season	Division	Apps	Goals	Apps	Goals	Apps	Goals	Apps	Goals	Apps	Goals
Norwich City	2002–03	First Division	2	0	0	0	0	0	—		2	0
Norwich City	2003–04	First Division	6	0	0	0	0	0	—		6	0
Norwich City	2004–05	Premier League	11	0	0	0	1	0	—		12	0
Norwich City	2005–06	Championship	17	0	0	0	2	0	—		19	0
Norwich City	2006–07	Championship	43	3	3	0	2	0	—		48	3
Norwich City	2007–08	Championship	39	0	1	0	2	0	—		42	0
Norwich City	2008–09	Championship	1	0	—		1	0	—		2	0
Norwich City	Total		119	3	4	0	8	0	—		131	3
Wolverhampton Wanderers	2008–09	Championship	12	0	1	0	—		—		13	0
Norwich City (loan)	2008–09	Championship	14	0	—		—		—		14	0
Doncaster Rovers (loan)	2009–10	Championship	21	1	2	0	—		—		23	1
Barnsley	2010–11	Championship	44	3	1	0	1	0	—		46	3
Derby County	2011–12	Championship	46	1	2	0	1	0	—		49	1
Burnley	2012–13	Championship	44	2	1	0	1	0	—		46	2
Burnley	2013–14	Championship	46	2	1	0	4	0	—		51	2
Burnley	2014–15	Premier League	38	0	0	0	1	0	—		39	0
Burnley	Total		128	4	2	0	6	0	—		136	4
Derby County	2015–16	Championship	46	1	1	0	1	1	2 (Note: Appearances in Championship play-offs)	0	50	2
Derby County	2016–17	Championship	8	0	2	0	0	0	—		10	0
Derby County	2017–18	Championship	0	0	—		2	0	—		2	0
Derby County	Total		54	1	3	0	3	1	2	0	62	2
Derby County U23	2016–17	—			—		—		1 (Note: Appearance in EFL Trophy)	0	1	0
Millwall (loan)	2017–18	Championship	7	0	2	0	—		—		9	0
Lincoln City	2018–19	League Two	34	4	3	0	2	1	1	0	40	5
Lincoln City	2019–20	League One	26	2	2	0	1	0	—		29	2
Lincoln City	Total		60	6	5	0	3	1	1	0	69	7
Career total			505	19	22	0	22	2	4	0	551	21

== Managerial statistics ==
As of 1 March 2026

Managerial record by team and tenure
Team	Nat	From	To	Record								Ref
Team	Nat	From	To	G	W	D	L	GF	GA	GD	Win %	Ref
Austin FC II	(United States)	November 11, 2025	Present	1	0	0	1	2	4	−2	0.00	
Career total				1	0	0	1	2	4	−2	0.00	—

== Honours ==
=== Player ===
Wolverhampton Wanderers

- Football League Championship: 2008–09

Burnley

- Football League Championship runner-up: 2013–14

Lincoln City

- EFL League Two: 2018–19

Individual

- Barnsley Player of the Year: 2010–11
- PFA Team of the Year: 2013–14 Championship
- PFA Team of the Year: 2018–19 League Two

=== Manager ===
Austin FC II

- MLS Next Pro Regular Season Champion: 2026

Individual

- MLS Next Pro Coach of the Year: 2026
