= Martin Hunter (football coach) =

English football manager

Martin Hunter is an English football coach. In his time in football he has held coaching positions at Bradford City, Stoke City, Norwich City, Watford and Southampton.

== Career ==
Hunter started his career as a teacher. At Bridgewater Hall School, part of the Stantonbury Campus in Milton Keynes, he taught Physical Education and Geography between 1979 and 1987. He holds the UEFA Pro Licence and has also run coaching courses to help others achieve that qualification.

Hunter worked as the assistant manager at Bradford City and Stoke City. He subsequently worked for The Football Association for 13 years. Initially he was a regional director of coaching, before landing head coach roles with England's Under-15s, Under-16s and finally the Under-19s. As Under-19 head coach Hunter worked with some future full international players, including Joe Cole, Theo Walcott and Michael Carrick.

Hunter joined Norwich City as first-team coach on 26 June 2006, working under Nigel Worthington. On 1 October 2006 Worthington was sacked and Hunter was appointed caretaker manager. He applied for the permanent position but West Ham United assistant manager Peter Grant who was appointed on 16 October 2006.

On 18 June 2007, Chris Hutchings said that he wanted Hunter, his former colleague at Bradford City, to be his assistant at Wigan Athletic. Instead Hunter joined Watford on 25 July 2007 as the club's first-team coach, working under Aidy Boothroyd. Boothroyd was sacked on 3 November 2008 and Hunter subsequently worked alongside caretaker manager Malky Mackay. He left Watford on 24 November 2008 following the appointment of new manager Brendan Rodgers.

Hunter returned to Bradford City to assist caretaker manager Wayne Jacobs on 15 February 2010. On 15 July 2010, he was appointed Southampton's Under-21 coach. On 30 August 2010, he was named the club's assistant manager of a temporary basis, following the dismissal of Alan Pardew. In summer 2014 Southampton made a number of changes to their backroom team. Ronald Koeman was appointed manager and Hunter was named technical director. He left Southampton on 8 November 2018 alongside vice-chairman Les Reed, the man who appointed him in 2010.

== Managerial stats ==
Team	Nat	From	To	Record				
Team	Nat	From	To	G	W	L	D	Win %
Norwich City	(England)	2 October 2006	16 October 2006	1	0	0	1	00.00
