= Roger Munby =

English businessman and football executive

Roger Munby (1945 - 2022) was a British businessman and former chairman of Norwich City Football Club.

== Biography ==
Munby was born in Hull and was a businessman in Norwich, England, when he became a director of Norwich City football club between January 1986 and September 1987 and again in May 1996. He took over as chairman from Bob Cooper in 2002 and served in that role until May 2009 when he and chief executive, Neil Doncaster, resigned following the club’s relegation from the English Football League Championship; Munby was then the longest-serving member of the board. He was inducted into the Norwich City F.C. Hall of Fame in November 2009.

Munby was a former marketing director at Colman's in Norwich and managing director of SMRC Ltd, a local marketing company, when he joined the board of the football club. After stepping down as chairman, he returned to marketing and was managing director of Saxlingham Associates, working on the marketing strategy for a new fried pasta snack, Pastinos. In 2016, he took on a role with a fundraising appeal for the East Anglia’s Children’s Hospices charity. Munby died in September 2022.
