= Kris Renton =

Scottish footballer (born 1990)

Personal information
- Full name: Kris Joseph Renton
- Date of birth: 12 July 1990 (age 36)
- Place of birth: Musselburgh, Scotland
- Position: Striker

Team information
- Current team: Musselburgh Athletic

Youth career
- –2006: Musselburgh Windsor

Senior career*
| Years | Team | Apps | (Gls) |
| 2006–2010 | Norwich City | 3 | (0) |
| 2009 | → King's Lynn (loan) | 10 | (0) |
| 2009 | → Brechin City (loan) | 11 | (0) |
| 2010–2012 | Musselburgh Athletic | | |
| 2012–2014 | Bonnyrigg Rose Athletic | | |
| 2014–2016 | Newtongrange Star | | |
| 2016–2017 | Cowdenbeath | 32 | (10) |
| 2017–2018 | Alloa Athletic | 31 | (6) |
| 2018–2022 | Cowdenbeath | 79 | (11) |
| 2022–2023 | Tranent Juniors | | |
| 2023–2024 | Musselburgh Athletic | | |
- * Club domestic league appearances and goals as of 00:40, 25 February 2022 (UTC)

Kris Joseph Renton (born 12 July 1990) is a Scottish footballer who used to play as a striker for Musselburgh Athletic now retired and joined the coaching team at Musselburgh FC. He was the youngest Norwich City player in the club's history.

== Norwich City ==
=== Youth team at Norwich ===
Having been spotted playing in the summer of 2006 in Scotland playing for Musselburgh Windsor by Academy scout Karl Brady, Renton began the 2006–07 season in the youth team. He spent some time away though, being named in the Ireland Under 17s for a European Under 17 Championship qualifying tournament in Baku in Autumn 2006, but made his debut at that level for Scotland Under 17s in February 2007 against Northern Ireland.

Towards the end of the campaign, he progressed into the Reserves at Norwich, making his debut on 21 February 2007 against local rivals Ipswich. He scored his first goal for the second string on 24 April 2007 against Southend.

=== Early senior appearances ===
He was named on the bench for the first time on 31 March 2007 against Colchester United. Should he have played, he would have broken Ryan Jarvis' record as Norwich's youngest ever player, at just 16 years and 262 days. Norwich Academy manager Ricky Martin said that Renton's call up to the first team provided a massive incentive to other players in the youth side. City manager Peter Grant told the club's website that Renton was due to make his debut as a second-half substitute in the Colchester game, but Grant was unwilling to throw on a debutant with the side struggling in the course of a 3–0 defeat.

He did however make his debut in the 2–1 win at Leicester City coming on in injury time at the end of the second half, on 14 April 2007, making him the youngest ever player to appear for Norwich City, beating Jarvis' record by 6 days, aged 16 years 276 days. Renton made his full debut three days later at Burnley replacing the injured Darren Huckerby, who had hurt his back in the warm up.

For the start of the 2007–08 season, Renton was back playing with the Reserves and the Under 18s, and was scoring regularly. But against Chelsea Under 18s on 6 October he suffered a broken leg, which kept him out for the rest of the season.

On 16 July 2008, having recovered from the broken leg which kept him out for most of the previous campaign, Renton signed his first professional contract with Norwich City, lasting two years. He joined King's Lynn on loan on 6 March 2009, to gain more first-team experience, but failed to score in ten appearances.

=== Scottish junior football ===
In January 2010, he was released by Norwich City and returned to his hometown, joining Scottish junior club Musselburgh Athletic. Renton helped Musselburgh to the Scottish Junior Cup final in 2010–11 before joining East Superleague champions Bonnyrigg Rose Athletic in June 2012. He moved on to local rivals Newtongrange Star in July 2014.

=== Scottish lower divisions ===
In June 2016, Renton signed for recently relegated Scottish League Two side Cowdenbeath.

After impressing in his performances for Cowdenbeath, Renton was signed by Scottish League One club Alloa Athletic on 1 June 2017. He left the club in May 2018 following their promotion to the Scottish Championship.

In May 2018, Renton once again signed for Cowdenbeath. On 24 February 2022, Renton left the club after his contract was cancelled by mutual consent.

On 25 February 2022, Renton signed for East of Scotland League Premier Division side Tranent Juniors.

From summer 2023 onwards he has ended up at Musselburgh Athletic then retired and joined their backroom coaching staff at the club where he was born.
