= Neil Doncaster =

British association football executive (born 1970)

CEO of the Scottish Professional Football League
- Incumbent
- Assumed office 3 July 2012

CEO of the Scottish Premier League
- In office 2009–2012

Personal details
- Born: 1970 (age 55–56) Devon, England

Neil Doncaster (born 1970) is an association football executive. He was appointed as chief executive of the Scottish Professional Football League in July 2012, having previously held the same position at the Scottish Premier League from 2009 to 2012 at Norwich City F.C. from 2001 to 2009.

== Profile ==
Born in Devon, Doncaster graduated from the University of Bristol in 1992, qualified as a solicitor and worked for four years for Burges Salmon, solicitors. In 2008, he obtained an MBA from the University of East Anglia.

While at Norwich City, he was a director of FL Interactive Limited, the subsidiary of The Football League responsible for official club websites, and EventGuard Limited, a security company.

== Career in football ==
Doncaster joined Norwich City in November 1997 as company secretary and solicitor, and two years later he was promoted to head of operations before taking up the role of chief executive in 2001. During his time at Norwich, he took an active role in English football. From 2006, he was a director of The Football League. In July 2008, he was elected to The Football Association board as one of two representatives of The Football League.

As Chief executive of Norwich City, Doncaster oversaw their promotion to the Premier League for the 2004–05 season. However, after the team's relegation from The Championship to League One in May 2009, he stepped down from his position, along with chairman Roger Munby. In the following months, he also left his positions on the boards of The Football Association and The Football League.

On 7 July 2009, Doncaster was appointed Chief Executive of the Scottish Premier League. During his time at the SPL, Doncaster presided over the crisis that saw Rangers F.C. go into liquidation while restructuring the league. Those efforts were concluded in 2013, as the Scottish Premier League and the Scottish Football League were merged into a single league for all 42 professional clubs. The Scottish Professional Football League was created on a one club, one vote basis, with a pyramid structure, allowing non-league clubs to compete for entry to the professional leagues, and a redistribution of wealth in favour of the second tier. It also saw the return of play-offs between teams in the top two divisions, the Scottish Premiership and the Scottish Championship.

On 3 July 2013, it was confirmed that Doncaster had beaten David Longmuir to the position of chief executive of the newly formed Scottish Professional Football League. In the same year, Doncaster was elected to the board of the European Professional Football Leagues.

In the summer of 2015, Doncaster confirmed that the British bookmaker Ladbrokes would be the new sponsor of all Scottish Professional Football League competitions, the first sponsor of the top tier of Scottish football since Clydesdale Bank's deal ran out in 2013. Ladbrokes' deal, believed to be worth £2m per year over two years, is said to be "the biggest ever of its kind in Scottish football".

In 2018, Doncaster secured sponsorship and broadcasting deals for the Scottish Professional Football League, announcing in January that Ladbrokes would be extending its title sponsorship until 2020, and in November making deals with Sky Sports, Premier Sports and the BBC, which he hailed as "a major increase on our current contracts" and "the largest ever injection of broadcast investment since the SPL was founded over 20 years ago".

In March 2018, Doncaster joined the board of the Scottish Football Association, making him the first person to have sat on the boards of both the English FA and the Scottish FA.

Doncaster served on UEFA's Legal Committee between 2018 and 2020 and was appointed as a member of UEFA's Control, Ethics and Disciplinary Body in June 2020.
