= Robert Eagle =

English association football player

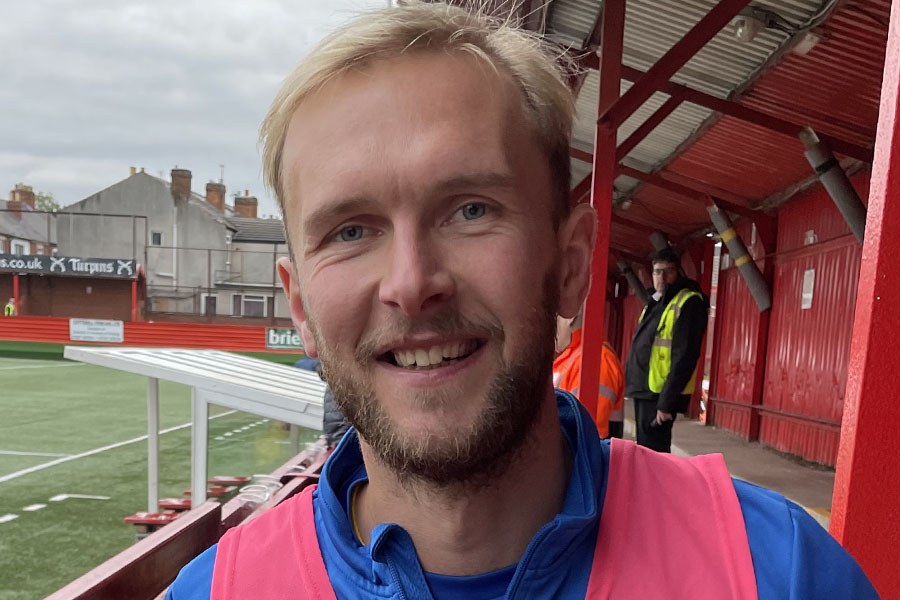
- Eagle in October 2021

Personal information
- Full name: Robert John Eagle
- Date of birth: 23 February 1987 (age 39)
- Place of birth: Leiston, England
- Height: 1.70 m (5 ft 7 in)
- Position: Left-back

Youth career
- Norwich City

Senior career*
Years	Team	Apps	(Gls)
2006–2009	Norwich City	10	(1)
2009–2010	Inverness Caledonian Thistle	19	(1)
2010–2012	Grimsby Town	50	(9)
2011–2012	→ Alfreton Town (loan)	3	(0)
2012–2016	Lowestoft Town	156	(24)
2016–2017	AFC Sudbury	35	(4)
2017–2018	Leiston	38	(3)
2018	Lowestoft Town	11	(1)
2018–2022	Leiston	77	(3)
2022–2026	Lowestoft Town	42	(0)

Managerial career
- 2026: Lowestoft Town (player-manager)
- * Club domestic league appearances and goals as of 10:22, 5 September 2024 (UTC)

Robert John Eagle (born 23 February 1987) is an English semi-professional footballer who last played as a left-back for Lowestoft Town, where he was also last manager.

As a professional he has represented three clubs, starting his career with Norwich City before playing for Inverness Caledonian Thistle and Grimsby Town. He moved into semi-professional football in 2012 following a loan spell with Alfreton Town he later played for Lowestoft Town, A.F.C. Sudbury and Leiston.

== Playing career ==
=== Norwich City ===
Eagle was a product of the Norwich City youth system and made his first team debut on 19 September 2006 when he started Norwich's League Cup tie with league one outfit Rotherham United in which he helped Norwich to a 4–2 victory. He went on to make 10 league appearances before the end of the 2006–07 season. On 3 April 2007, Robert signed a new one-year contract with the club.

Eagle did not feature under manager Glenn Roeder in the 2007–08 season, but was awarded a new one-year contract in the summer of 2008. However, in April 2009 he was released by the club.

=== Inverness Caledonian Thistle ===
In July 2009, Eagle joined Inverness Caledonian Thistle on trial, and played in a pre-season friendly against Highland League side Buckie Thistle. Eagle supplied the cross for Richie Foran to head the first goal in a 2–0 win for Caley. Eagle went on to play for Inverness during the 2009–2010 season. The song by Haircut 100, 'Love Plus One,' was sung regularly by the Inverness crowd as a way of showing their appreciation to Eagle, whose hair they were very fond of.

=== Grimsby Town ===
In July 2010, Eagle joined Football League One side Leyton Orient on trial, and then moved on to Grimsby Town. After a successful trial period with The Mariners, he signed for the club on a two-year deal on 5 August 2010. He scored his first goal against Forest Green Rovers going on to score another to help Town to a 3–3 draw. Eagle went on to bag himself some tremendous goals, including a strike from inside the centre circle in the 6–1 away win at Histon.

Following the departure of manager Neil Woods on 23 February 2011, Eagle began to fall out of contention at Grimsby Town following the appointment of joint managers Rob Scott and Paul Hurst on 23 March 2011.

On 23 November 2011 he signed on loan with fellow Conference National side Alfreton Town. Eagle had an impressive spell with Alfreton Town, with manager Nicky Law even hailing the impact Eagle, and fellow player Adam Quinn had during their loan spells.

=== Non-League ===
Eagle was released from his contract at Grimsby Town in early January 2012 and moved to Lowestoft Town on a non-contract basis, playing in a match with Kirkley & Pakefield and scoring in the first minute.

Robert signed for Isthmian League Premier Division side A.F.C. Sudbury on 19 May 2016. A.F.C. Sudbury finished the 2016–17 season in 23rd position and were relegated.

Eagle was confirmed as signed for him home town club Leiston on 30 May 2017 on a two-year contract. Robert made his Leiston debut on 12 August 2017 in an Isthmian League Premier Division home fixture against Dorking Wanderers, which the home side won 1-0 courtesy of a goal from Kyle Hammond.

Eagle scored his first goal for Leiston on 23 September 2017 in an Isthmian League Premier Division home fixture against Metropolitan Police, coming on as an 88th-minute substitute for Dominic Docherty, and scoring on the 95th minute with practically the last kick of the ball, to help the club to a convincing 3–0 victory. It was confirmed on 6 February 2018, that Eagle had re-joined Isthmian League Premier Division side Lowestoft Town for the remainder of the 2017–18 season. Eagle made 11 appearances for Lowestoft Town.

Robert returned to Leiston on 14 November 2018 in a player-coach capacity, having played the previous night in a Suffolk Premier Cup fixture against Haverhill Rovers, where he scored the 4th goal in a 6–1 win. On 16 June 2019, Leiston confirmed that Eagle, along with Byron Lawrence had signed contracts for the 2018–19 season.

On 10 June 2022, Eagle signed for relegated former side Lowestoft Town, who will contest the 2022–23 season in the Isthmian League North Division.

== Personal life ==
Robert has a brother who has played non league football for Leiston.

In February 2020 he was convicted of sexual assault in a Norwich nightclub and was ordered to carry out 140 hours of unpaid work and put on the sex offender registry for 5 years.

== Career statistics ==
As of match played 23 April 2022.

Club	Season	League			FA Cup		League Cup		Other		Total	
Club	Season	Division	Apps	Goals	Apps	Goals	Apps	Goals	Apps	Goals	Apps	Goals
Leiston	2017–18	Isthmian League Premier Division	17	2	3	0	—		2 (Note: One appearance in Velocity Trophy) (Note: One appearance in FA Trophy)	0	22	2
Lowestoft Town (loan)	2017–18	Isthmian League Premier Division	11	0	0	0	—		0	0	11	0
Leiston	2018–19	Southern League Premier Division Central	4	0	2	0	—		1 (Note: One appearance in Southern League Cup)	0	7	0
Lowestoft Town	2018–19	Southern League Premier Division Central	0	0	1	0	—		0	0	1	0
Leiston	2018–19	Southern League Premier Division Central	16	1	0	0	—		4 (Note: Four appearances in Suffolk Premier Cup)	0	20	1
Leiston	2019–20	Southern League Premier Division Central	23	2	1	0	—		3 (Note: One appearance in Southern League Cup) (Note: Two appearances in Suffolk Premier Cup)	1 (Note: One goal in Suffolk Premier Cup)	27	3
Leiston	2020–21	Southern League Premier Division Central	8	0	5	1	—		1 (Note: One appearance in FA Trophy)	0	14	1
Leiston	2021–22	Southern League Premier Division Central	24	0	4	0	—		5 (Note: Three appearances in FA Trophy) (Note: Two appearances in Suffolk Premier Cup)	0	33	0
Lowestoft Town	2022–23	Isthmian League North Division	0	0	0	0	—		0	0	0	0
Career total			103	5	16	1	0	0	15	1	135	7

== Honours ==
=== Grimsby Town ===
- Lincolnshire Senior Cup: Winner, 2011–12
