= Rainforest in Victoria =

Victoria, Australia contains approximately 32,000 hectares of temperate rainforest in various regions, which represents 0.14% of the State's total area. The areas with rainforest include: East Gippsland, Strzelecki Ranges, Wilsons Promontory, Central Highlands, and Otway Ranges. The rainforests vary between cool temperate, warm temperate, and mixed cool temperate.

== Protection ==
In Victorian forests subject to timber harvesting operations rainforest is protected by the Code of Practice for Timber Production (DSE 2007), which requires that:

"Rainforest communities in Victoria must not be harvested. Rainforest communities must be protected from the impacts of harvesting through the use of appropriate buffers to maintain microclimatic conditions and protect from disease and other disturbance."

However, mixed cool temperate rainforest has not been completely mapped in Victoria, and no pre-logging surveys occur to check for this forest type. Old-growth forest, with trees dating from pre-1900s, are also meant to be protected.

Victorian rainforests occurring inside national parks are protected from logging.

Rainforest does not regenerate following clearfell, coupe logging, which is practiced in Victoria.

== Plant species ==
There are many plant species found in the various rainforests of Victoria, which differentiate it from wet sclerophyll forest. This is a combined list of differential species from the various rainforest areas in Victoria.

- Nothofagus cunninghamii, Myrtle Beech
- Hymenophyllum australe, Austral Filmy-fern
- Hymenophyllum flabellatum, Shiny Filmy-fern
- Rumohra adiantiformis, Leathery Shield-fern
- Crepidomanes venosum, Veined Bristle-fern
- Blechnum chambersii, Lance Water-fern
- Blechnum nudum, Fishbone Water-fern
- Grammitis billardieri, Common Finger-fern
- Microsorum pustulatum, Kangaroo Fern
- Todea barbara, Austral King-fern
- Blechnum fluviatile, Ray Water-fern
- Blechnum patersonii, Strap Water-fern
- Blechnum penna-marina, Alpine Water-fern
- Parablechnum wattsii, Hard Water-fern
- Cyathea cunninghamii, Slender Tree-fern
- Cyathea × marcescens, Skirted Tree-fern
- Dicksonia antarctica, Soft Tree-fern
- Polystichum proliferum, Mother Shield-fern
- Pellaea falcata, Sickle Fern
- Asplenium flaccidum, Weeping Spleenwort
- Asplenium gracillimum, Mother Spleenwort
- Stellaria flaccida, Forest Starwort
- Uncinia tenella, Delicate Hook-sedge
- Carex appressa, Tall Sedge
- Carex alsophila, Forest Sedge
- Isolepis inundata, Swamp Club-sedge
- Uncinia nemoralis, River Hook-sedge
- Gahnia melanocarpa, Black-fruit Saw-sedge
- Atherosperma moschatum, southern sassafras
- Parsonsia brownii, Twining Silkpod
- Leptospermum grandifolium, Mountain Tea-tree
- Libertia pulchella, Pretty Grass-flag
- Wittsteinia vacciniacea, Baw Baw Berry
- Australina pusilla, Shade Nettle
- Urtica incisa, Scrub Nettle
- Coprosma nitida, Shining Coprosma
- Acrothamnus maccraei, Subalpine Beard-heath
- Oxalis magellanica, Snowdrop Wood-sorrel
- Fieldia australis, Fieldia
- Pittosporum undulatum, Sweet Pittosporum
- Myrsine howittiana, Mutton-wood
- Sambucus gaudichaudiana, White Elderberry
- Pomaderris aspera, Hazel Pomaderris
- Hackelia latifolia (syn. Austrocynoglossum latifolium), Forest Hound's-tongue
- Acacia melanoxylon, Blackwood
- Bedfordia arborescens, Blanket Leaf
- Podocarpus lawrencei, Errinundra Plum-pine
- Syzygium smithii, Lilly Pilly
- Cissus hypoglauca, Jungle Grape
- Leichhardtia rostrata, Milk Vine
- Rubus moluccanus, Queensland Bramble
- Rubus rosifolius, Rose-leaf Bramble
- Morinda jasminoides, Jasmine Morinda
- Notelaea venosa, Large Mock-olive
- Tristaniopsis laurina, Kanooka or Water Gum
