= List of Celebrity Mastermind episodes =

Celebrity Mastermind is a celebrity version of the British television quiz show Mastermind which is broadcast by BBC television. As with the standard show, four celebrities answer questions on a chosen "specialist subject" for a specific amount of time (usually one and a half minutes) before answering questions on general knowledge but with an extended time limit (usually two minutes). The contestant with the most correct answers wins. In contrast to the standard show each episode is treated as a single contest with the winner receiving a trophy, and the contestant's fees are donated to charity.

The celebrity version was first broadcast on 30 December 2002 as a one-off special to the usual Mastermind hosted by Magnus Magnusson. When the show returned for a full series it was presented by John Humphrys who had taken over as host of the original version. When Humphrys stepped down from hosting in 2021, Clive Myrie took over hosting both shows from 2022. As of the episode broadcast on the 27 January 2025, 212 episodes have been broadcast across 23 series, including three Children in Need special episodes. There have been 773 different contestants who have taken part in at least one episode. 72 contestants have participated in at least two episodes, with three of them also competing in a third episode.

== Series overview ==
Series	Episodes	Originally released		
Series	Episodes	First released	Last released	Network
Special		30 December 2002		BBC Two
1	3	26 December 2003	2 January 2004	BBC Two
2	3	23 July 2004	6 August 2004	BBC One
3	2	26 December 2004	31 December 2004	BBC One
4	5	28 December 2005	2 January 2006	BBC One
5	5	26 December 2006	30 December 2006	BBC One
6	5	31 December 2007	4 January 2008	BBC One
7	5	28 December 2008	1 January 2009	BBC One
8	10	27 December 2009	7 January 2010	BBC One
9	10	27 December 2010	7 January 2011	BBC One
10	10	27 December 2011	8 January 2012	BBC One
11	10	27 December 2012	5 January 2013	BBC One
12	10	23 December 2013	17 January 2014	BBC One
13	10	21 December 2014	18 January 2015	BBC One
14	10	22 December 2015	9 January 2016	BBC One
15	10	19 December 2016	14 January 2017	BBC One
16	10	27 December 2017	13 January 2018	BBC One
17	10	21 December 2018	18 January 2019	BBC One
18	10	27 December 2019	4 April 2020	BBC One
19	14	19 December 2020	8 May 2021	BBC One
20	14	5 February 2022	7 May 2022	BBC One
21	14	5 November 2022	29 April 2023	BBC One
22	14	24 November 2023	22 March 2024	BBC One
23	14	23 December 2024	27 January 2025	BBC Two
24	14	22 December 2025	26 January 2026	BBC Two
25	TBA	2027	2027	BBC Two

== Key ==
- The contestant who won each episode is written in **bold**
- An equal sign (=) before a position indicates two contestants shared that position
- Contestants who appeared in more than one episode have the number of each of their appearances in brackets (e.g. (1) = First appearance)
- Up to series 5 the contestants are listed in alphabetical order by surname, and from series 6 they are listed in the order they participated in the first round

== Episodes ==
=== Special (2002) ===
No. overall	No. in series	Contestants	Specialist subjects	Pos.	Original release date
1	1	Adam Hart-Davis; **Jonathan Meades**; Janet Street-Porter; Vic Reeves	Heroes of science and invention before 1900; English architecture 1850–2002; British teapots 1735–1970; Golden age of piracy 1680–1720	=2nd 1st =2nd 4th	30 December 2002

=== Series 1 (2003–04) ===
No. overall	No. in series	Contestants	Specialist subjects	Pos.	Original release date
2	1	David Blunkett; Jeremy Bowen; Antony Worrall Thompson; **Shaun Williamson**	Harry Potter novels Arab–Israeli Six-Day War; Works of Escoffier; Richard Burton	4th 3rd 2nd 1st	26 December 2003
3	2	Germaine Greer; Charlie Higson (1); **Bill Oddie**; Julia Somerville	Australian rainforests James Bond; American jazz Winnie-the-Pooh	3rd 2nd 1st 4th	31 December 2003
4	3	Gyles Brandreth; **Stephen Fry**; Tanni Grey-Thompson; Andrew Motion	Life and works of John Gielgud; Sherlock Holmes; First three Star Wars films Philip Larkin	4th 1st 2nd 3rd	2 January 2004

=== Series 2 (2004) ===
No. overall	No. in series	Contestants	Specialist subjects	Pos.	Original release date
5	1	**Edwina Currie** (1); Simon King; Tracy-Ann Oberman (1); Richard Whiteley	Marie Curie; British wildlife Imperial Roman family History of the BBC and its programmes 1950–60	1st 4th 2nd 3rd	23 July 2004
6	2	**Matt Allwright**; Bernard Cribbins; David Grant; Murray Walker	Films of the Coen brothers Angling; Stevie Wonder; Formula One	1st 4th 3rd 2nd	30 July 2004
7	3	Tara Palmer-Tomkinson; **Steve Rider**; Arabella Weir (1); Adam Woodyatt	Life and works of Audrey Hepburn; Masters Tournament; Dallas; Blackadder Goes Forth	4th 1st 3rd 2nd	6 August 2004

=== Series 3 (2004) ===
No. overall	No. in series	Contestants	Specialist subjects	Pos.	Original release date
8	1	Ricky Groves (1); Neil Hamilton; Martin Offiah (1); **Hugh Quarshie**	British pop music British politics World War II; Richard Pryor	4th 2nd 3rd 1st	26 December 2004
9	2	Eric Knowles; Shirley Robertson; Jimmy Savile; **Tom Ward**	Artistry of René Lalique; Olympic sailing Top of the Pops; Philip Larkin	3rd 4th 2nd 1st	31 December 2004

=== Series 4 (2005–06) ===
No. overall	No. in series	Contestants	Specialist subjects	Pos.	Original release date
10	1	**Jeremy Beadle**; Natalie Cassidy; Jeremy Edwards (1); Tim Rice	Solar System; Friends; Johnny Depp; London capital murders 1900–1940	1st 3rd 4th 2nd	28 December 2005
11	2	Diane Abbott; Phil Cornwell; **Monty Don**; Nicholas Owen	Jamaican politics Apollo space missions The Beatles; Railways of south-east England	2nd 4th 1st 3rd	29 December 2005
12	3	Andrew Castle; **Graeme Le Saux**; Peter Tatchell; Gina Yashere	Men's Grand Slam tennis History of Jersey; Malcolm X Lifts	4th 1st 3rd 2nd	30 December 2005
13	4	Diarmuid Gavin (1); Lembit Öpik; Wendi Peters; **Paul Ross**	U2; Kander and Ebb musicals Japanese motorcycles Life and work of Ezra Pound	4th 2nd 3rd 1st	1 January 2006
14	5	**Iain Banks**; Myleene Klass; Alistair McGowan (1); Sid Waddell	Malt whisky Sex and the City season 3 Life and work of Erik Satie; History of rock and roll 1955–65	1st 3rd 4th 2nd	2 January 2006

=== Series 5 (2006) ===
No. overall	No. in series	Contestants	Specialist subjects	Pos.	Original release date
15	1	Clare Balding; Ranulph Fiennes; Rageh Omaar; **Steven Pinder**	Epsom Derby 1970–2000; Expeditions of Captain Scott to Antarctica; Presidency of George W. Bush; Life and career of Steve McQueen	2nd 4th 3rd 1st	26 December 2006
16	2	Hugh Fearnley-Whittingstall; Henry Kelly; **Edward Stourton**; Kelli Young	Wild foods of Britain; Classical music 1850–1950; Pope John Paul II; British pop music 2000–2006	3rd 2nd 1st 4th	27 December 2006
17	3	**Todd Carty**; Paul Henshall; Henry Olonga; Gok Wan	Films of Norman Wisdom; 3rd Rock from the Sun; Book of Genesis; Beautiful Thing	1st 3rd 2nd 4th	28 December 2006
18	4	**Iain Lee**; Jimmy McGovern; Scott Mills; Bernie Nolan	The Monkees; First Fleet; Prisoner: Cell Block H Films of Frank Sinatra	1st 2nd 4th 3rd	29 December 2006
19	5	Josie d'Arby (1); **Dave Spikey** (1); Brian Turner; Matthew Wright	Practices of reiki Human blood Marie-Antoine Carême; Frank Zappa	4th 1st 3rd 2nd	30 December 2006

=== Series 6 (2007–08) ===
No. overall	No. in series	Contestants	Specialist subjects	Pos.	Original release date
20	1	Paul Bradley; Dan Snow; **Peter Serafinowicz**; William G. Stewart	Captain Beefheart and The Magic Band; Seven Years' War; Monty Python's Flying Circus; Lord Elgin and the Elgin Marbles	3rd 2nd 1st 4th	31 December 2007
21	2	Adrian Edmondson (1); Bill Turnbull; **Jan Ravens**; Benjamin Zephaniah	Sex Pistols; Beekeeping; Daphne du Maurier; Jamaican reggae up to 1985	3rd 4th 1st 2nd	1 January 2008
22	3	**Steve Cram**; Anjum Anand; Tony Hawks (1); Bill Kenwright	Sunderland A.F.C. Partition of India; Tony Hawk; The Hit Parade 1957–1964	1st 4th 2nd 3rd	2 January 2008
23	4	Wayne Sleep (1); Yvette Fielding (1); **DJ Spoony**; Brian Sewell	Bob Fosse; Henry VIII; Ray Charles; British motor cars 1930–1950	2nd 3rd 1st 4th	3 January 2008
24	5	**Kaye Adams**; Simon Rimmer; Danny Wallace; Nicholas Parsons	The Pankhursts; Tranmere Rovers F.C. Ghostbusters; Edward Lear	1st 3rd 4th 2nd	4 January 2008

=== Series 7 (2008–09) ===
No. overall	No. in series	Contestants	Specialist subjects	Pos.	Original release date
25	1	**Dave Myers**; Toyah Willcox (1); David Lammy; David Harewood	Pre-Raphaelite Brotherhood; David Bowie 1967–1977; Muhammad Ali; His Dark Materials	1st 3rd 2nd 4th	28 December 2008
26	2	Rav Wilding (1); Mark Chapman; **Philippa Gregory**; Jon Culshaw (1)	Human body Premier League football Elizabeth Woodville; British pop of the 1980s	4th 2nd 1st 3rd	29 December 2008
27	3	Bob Harris; **John Sessions**; Louise Minchin; Andrew Neil	Life and career of Alan Freed; Sherlock Holmes short stories Life and career of Darcey Bussell; Life of Adam Smith	3rd 1st 2nd 4th	30 December 2008
28	4	**Sally Lindsay**; Mick Hucknall; Summer Strallen; Mel Smith	Carry On films Life and career of Henri Matisse; Breeds of dog Comedies of William Shakespeare	1st 4th 2nd 3rd	31 December 2008
29	5	Phil Daniels; Rick Wakeman; Ian Lavender; **Tim Vine** (1)	Chelsea F.C. in the 1970s Just William; Buster Keaton; Elvis Presley	4th 3rd 2nd 1st	1 January 2009

=== Series 8 (2009–10) ===
No. overall	No. in series	Contestants	Specialist subjects	Pos.	Original release date
**Children in Need special**
30	–	Stephen K. Amos (1); **Lucy Porter** (1); Dave Spikey (2); Mark Watson (1)	Five Star; Steve Martin; Leeds and Liverpool Canal; FIFA World Cup since 1966	4th 1st 3rd 2nd	20 November 2009
**Series**
31	1	Goldie; Paul O'Grady; Gail Emms; **Loyd Grossman**	Films of Paul Thomas Anderson; Life and times of Gypsy Rose Lee; Gavin & Stacey; Art and artists of the 18th century	4th 3rd 2nd 1st	27 December 2009
32	2	Darren Bennett; **Stuart Maconie**; Linda Papadopoulos; Andrew Lancel	Star Wars films 20th century British poets and poetry Nirvana; Academy Awards	4th 1st 3rd 2nd	28 December 2009
33	3	**Alastair Stewart** (1); Steve Backshall (1); David Vitty; Saira Khan	The Rolling Stones; Judo; British motorways Life and works of Coco Chanel	1st 2nd 3rd 4th	29 December 2009
34	4	Joe Pasquale (1); Roger Black (1); **Antony Audenshaw**; Diane-Louise Jordan	Vampires in films Life and music of James Taylor; British birds Brothers & Sisters	3rd 2nd 1st 4th	30 December 2009
35	5	Ed Byrne; **Tristan Gemmill**; Anneka Rice; John Bishop	Star Trek films Apollo moon program Jean Rhys; Irish Potato Famine	3rd 1st 2nd 4th	1 January 2010
36	6	**Stewart Lee**; John Thomson (1); Sascha Kindred; Matthew Lewis	Life and work of Derek Bailey; James Bond villains Manchester United 1990–2010; Oasis	1st 2nd 4th 3rd	4 January 2010
37	7	Tony Parsons; Diane Parish; Russell Grant; **Paul Gambaccini**	British punk rock and new wave Frasier; County of Middlesex; DC Comics	3rd 4th 2nd 1st	5 January 2010
38	8	Michael Winner; Dom Joly; Mishal Husain; **John Bird**	British cinema of the 1960s Presidency of Jimmy Carter; The Chronicles of Narnia; Life and works of Igor Stravinsky	4th 2nd 3rd 1st	6 January 2010
39	9	Mark Foster (1); **Nigel Planer**; Ching He Huang; John Suchet	New Romantic; Life and works of Robert Louis Stevenson; Entourage; Life and music of Beethoven	=3rd 1st =3rd 2nd	7 January 2010
40	10	**Beverley Knight**; John Higgins; Michael Howard; Alex Deakin	Life and times of Prince; Dallas; Liverpool F.C. in the 1980s The Stone Roses	1st =3rd =3rd 2nd	7 January 2010

=== Series 9 (2010–11) ===
No. overall	No. in series	Contestants	Specialist subjects	Pos.	Original release date
**Children in Need special**
41	–	Stewart Francis (1); Tony Hawks (2); Fred MacAulay (2); **Andi Osho** (1)	Toronto Maple Leafs; Fridges; Fawlty Towers; The Matrix trilogy	3rd 4th 2nd 1st	19 November 2010
**Series**
42	1	Mark Lawrenson; **Hilary Kay**; Samantha Giles; Richard Herring	History of Preston North End F.C. Life and works of Josiah Wedgwood; Films of Alfred Hitchcock; Rasputin	4th 1st 3rd 2nd	27 December 2010
43	2	Giles Coren; Pixie McKenna; Dean Macey; **Samira Ahmed** (1)	Asterix the Gaul; History of Ellis Island; Back to the Future trilogy Laura Ingalls Wilder	2nd 4th 3rd 1st	28 December 2010
44	3	**Frank Gardner**; Levi Roots (1); Helen Chamberlain; Pam Rhodes	Birds of the Middle East; Jamaica 1960–present World Professional Darts Championship; Christmas carols	1st =2nd 4th =2nd	29 December 2010
45	4	David Threlfall; James Redmond; **Hattie Hayridge**; Ortis Deley	The Bonzo Dog Band; England national football team 1990–2010; Cold War; Spider-Man comics	3rd 4th 1st 2nd	30 December 2010
46	5	Adam Boulton; Toby Buckland; Kirsten O'Brien (1); **Rhys Thomas**	Life and books of Anthony Burgess; Father Ted; Reeves and Mortimer; Queen	2nd 4th 3rd 1st	31 December 2010
47	6	Robert Webb; Helen Skelton; Clive Sinclair; **Stephen Mangan**	Novels of Ian McEwan; Debbie Harry and Blondie; British inventions The Hitchhiker's Guide to the Galaxy	3rd 2nd 4th 1st	3 January 2011
48	7	Elaine C. Smith; Robert Llewellyn; **Michael Buerk**; Cerrie Burnell	Life and music of Joni Mitchell; Electric cars Novels of Patrick O'Brian; Life and works of Augusto Boal	2nd 3rd 1st 4th	4 January 2011
49	8	Simon O'Brien; **Digby Jones**; Jason Merrells; Terry Christian (1)	Life and music of Bob Marley; Kings and Queens of England 1485–present Life and work of Leonardo da Vinci; Manchester music 1977–present	2nd 1st 3rd 4th	5 January 2011
50	9	Derek Martin; Arthur Smith; **Brian Moore**; Alex Horne	Western films British radio comedy since 1950; Genesis; Life and career of Ken Dodd	4th 3rd 1st 2nd	6 January 2011
51	10	Kristina Rihanoff; Micky Flanagan; Martin Roberts (1); **Seeta Indrani**	Life and career of Patrick Swayze; Life and music of Bruce Springsteen; Cartoons of Hanna-Barbera; Operas of Giacomo Puccini	3rd 2nd 4th 1st	7 January 2011

=== Series 10 (2011–12) ===
No. overall	No. in series	Contestants	Specialist subjects	Pos.	Original release date
**Children in Need special**
52	–	Imran Yusuf; Karen Taylor; **Russell Kane** (1); Jarred Christmas	Life and films of Jackie Chan; Fred Dibnah; Evelyn Waugh; The Transformers	3rd 4th 1st 2nd	11 November 2011
**Series**
53	1	OJ Borg (1); Jay Rayner (1); **Simon Calder**; Antony Costa (1)	Original Star Wars trilogy Musicals of Stephen Sondheim; Concorde; Only Fools and Horses	3rd 4th 1st 2nd	27 December 2011
54	2	Stacey Solomon; **Simon Day**; Sophie Grigson; Steve Harley	The Inbetweeners; The Sopranos season 1 and 2 Highgate Cemetery; T. S. Eliot and the Four Quartets	4th 1st 2nd 3rd	28 December 2011
55	3	**Chris Packham**; Jenny Meadows (1); Alex Winters; Graeme Hawley	Battle of Rorke's Drift; Wigan Warriors; Manic Street Preachers; Blackadder	1st 4th 2nd 3rd	29 December 2011
56	4	Matthew Hoggard; Jules Hudson; **Justin Moorhouse**; Ray Fearon	Friends season 1 and 2 Operation Market Garden; Les Dawson; Othello	3rd 2nd 1st 4th	30 December 2011
57	5	**Andi Osho** (2); Michael Vaughan; Richard Arnold; Simon Armitage	John Humphrys; Premier League; Dallas; Ted Hughes	1st 4th 2nd 3rd	2 January 2012
58	6	Michel Roux Jr. Jessica Hynes; Jon Sopel; **Neil Hannon** (2)	Auguste Escoffier's Guide to Modern Cooking; Pam Ayres; Tony Blair; Frasier	4th 3rd 2nd 1st	3 January 2012
59	7	**Miles Jupp** (1); Rachel Riley; Wayne Hemingway (1); Gary O'Donoghue	Mike Atherton; Manchester United F.C. Disco music of the 1970s Winston Churchill	1st =2nd 4th =2nd	4 January 2012
60	8	**Neil Dudgeon**; Stewart Francis (2); Sandie Shaw; Andrew Collins	Philip Larkin; Toronto Blue Jays; Nichiren Buddhism; Disaster movies of the 1970s	1st 3rd 4th 2nd	5 January 2012
61	9	**Jacqui Smith**; Nathaniel Parker; Erin Boag; Jason Manford	The Archers; Marx Brothers; History of New Zealand; Quantum Leap	1st 2nd =3rd =3rd	6 January 2012
62	10	Sarah Storey; **Martin Lewis**; Nihal Arthanayake (1); Dan Walker	Sex and the City; Superman films Glenn Hoddle; Gunpowder Plot	4th 1st 3rd 2nd	8 January 2012

=== Series 11 (2012–13) ===
No. overall	No. in series	Contestants	Specialist subjects	Pos.	Original release date
63	1	Hannah Cockroft (1); **Val McDermid**; Lizo Mzimba; Crissy Rock (1)	McFly; Life of Christopher Marlowe; George Smiley novels of John le Carré; Life and works of Toulouse-Lautrec	3rd 1st 2nd 4th	27 December 2012
64	2	**Simon Evans**; Bobby Friction; Ewen MacIntosh; Alice Roberts	Ernest Shackleton and the Endurance expedition Life and music of Prince; Twin Peaks; Moomins novels of Tove Jansson	1st 4th 2nd 3rd	28 December 2012
65	3	Adam Buxton; Nelufar Hedayat; Chris Johnson; **Neil Pearson**	David Bowie in the 1970s Harry Potter novels Films of Monty Python; English language publishing in Paris	2nd =3rd =3rd 1st	29 December 2012
66	4	**Ken Bruce**; Sidney Sloane; Holly Walsh; Paul Young	Jeeves novels of P. G. Wodehouse; Liverpool F.C. under Bob Paisley; Badgers; Films of Johnny Depp	1st 3rd 2nd 4th	30 December 2012
67	5	Milton Jones; **Denise Robertson**; Adele Silva; Chris van Tulleken	Potatoes; John Lambton, 1st Earl of Durham; Children's stories of Roald Dahl; Life and achievements of Ranulph Fiennes	4th 1st 3rd 2nd	31 December 2012
68	6	**Pete Firman**; Jaye Griffiths; Paul Martin; Pete Reed	Life of Tommy Cooper; Life and career of Ayrton Senna; Rock drummers 1970–2000; The Lord of the Rings film trilogy	1st =2nd 4th =2nd	1 January 2013
69	7	Charles Campion; Darren Kenny; **Naga Munchetty**; Kurtis Stacey	Kenneth Grahame and The Wind in the Willows; Life and works of Wassily Kandinsky; Ryder Cup 1979–present Life and films of Arnold Schwarzenegger	2nd 3rd 1st 4th	2 January 2013
70	8	Clemency Burton-Hill; John Hammond; Martin Kelner; **Steve Punt**	Downton Abbey; Status Quo; Arsenal F.C. since 2000; Life and career of Tony Hancock	2nd 3rd 4th 1st	3 January 2013
71	9	Carol Decker; **Nick Hancock**; Austin Healey; Michael Underwood	Life and work of Tina Turner; The Great Gatsby by F. Scott Fitzgerald; Everton F.C. 1984–1994; James Bond – the Roger Moore years	4th 1st 2nd 3rd	4 January 2013
72	10	Cheryl Baker (2); **Tim Bentinck**; Mark Thompson; Guy Henry	Life and music of James Taylor; A. A. Milne and Winnie-the-Pooh; Coffee; Life and films of Peter O'Toole	3rd 1st 4th 2nd	5 January 2013

=== Series 12 (2013–14) ===
No. overall	No. in series	Contestants	Specialist subjects	Pos.	Original release date
73	1	Shaun Keaveny; **Mark Watson** (2); Bunny Campione; Frank Cottrell-Boyce	Music of Led Zeppelin; The Canterbury Tales; Life and films of Stewart Granger; Life and works of Oliver Postgate	3rd 1st 4th 2nd	23 December 2013
74	2	Danny John-Jules; Gail Porter; **Mike Bushell** (2); Prue Leith	Life and career of Bob Fosse; UK number 1 singles of the 1990s Alan Partridge; War time food in Britain	2nd 3rd 1st 4th	28 December 2013
75	3	**James Allen**; Chris Ramsey; David Bradley; Shobu Kapoor	Roald Dahl; The Sopranos; Max Wall; On the Road by Jack Kerouac	1st 3rd 2nd 4th	30 December 2013
76	4	**Josh Widdicombe**; Katharine Merry; Sian Reese-Williams; Nick Baker	Blur; Aston Villa F.C. 1980–1990; Black Books; Life and works of Alfred Russel Wallace	1st 3rd 2nd 4th	31 December 2013
77	5	Adil Ray; Mark Porter; **Kevin Eldon**; Jordan Stephens	Fawlty Towers; History of the Porsche 911; Music of The Beatles; Life and times of Ross Geller	4th 2nd 1st 3rd	2 January 2014
78	6	John Cooper Clarke; Roy Hudd; Ben Faulks; **Frank Turner**	Films of Elvis Presley; Life and career of Dan Leno; Imperial Trans-Antarctic Expedition; Iron Maiden	2nd 4th 3rd 1st	3 January 2014
79	7	**Hal Cruttenden** (1); Clare Perkins; Sophie Hosking; Huw Stephens	Rocky films The Border Trilogy; London Underground; Johnny Cash: the Columbia years	1st 2nd =3rd =3rd	4 January 2014
80	8	Charles Collingwood; Georgia Henshaw; Fred MacAulay (1); **Mark Billingham**	Hampshire County Cricket Club; Sherlock; Porridge; Elvis Costello	3rd 4th 2nd 1st	5 January 2014
81	9	**Rev. Richard Coles** (1); Monty Halls; Ava Vidal; Tony Livesey	Mapp and Lucia novels Life and times of Jacques Cousteau; Buffy the Vampire Slayer season 1 and 2 The Jam	1st 2nd 4th 3rd	12 January 2014
82	10	Clare Grogan; **Quentin Letts**; Newton Faulkner; Richard Whitehead	Doris Day; Hereford Cathedral; Life and work Harry Nilsson; Tottenham Hotspur F.C. 2000–present	2nd 1st 3rd 4th	17 January 2014

=== Series 13 (2014–15) ===
No. overall	No. in series	Contestants	Specialist subjects	Pos.	Original release date
83	1	Emma Barton; Tony Marshall; **Zoe Lyons** (1); Jamie Baulch	Carry On films Richard Pryor; Quentin Crisp; Prince	3rd 2nd 1st 4th	21 December 2014
84	2	Ore Oduba; Lizzy Yarnold; **Alex Riley**; Ken Dodd	David Beckham; The Archers 2000–present Triumph TR sports cars Theatre variety comedians since 1950	=2nd 4th 1st =2nd	22 December 2014
85	3	Mary Anne Hobbs; **Neil Fitzmaurice**; Katie Thistleton; Johnny Ball	Barry Sheene; Films of Robert De Niro; Life and times of Rachel Green; Michael Faraday	4th 1st 3rd 2nd	23 December 2014
86	4	Andy Day; **Ann Cleeves**; Tom Rosenthal; Robert Peston	Back to the Future trilogy Shetland Islands; Flags of the world David Bowie 1966–1976	4th 1st 3rd 2nd	27 December 2014
87	5	**Rob Deering** (1); Amy Willerton; Andy Bell; Jason Watkins	Novels of Jane Austen; Anne Boleyn; Blondie; David Garrick	1st 4th 3rd 2nd	28 December 2014
88	6	Kate Thornton (1); Tony Law; **Steve Pemberton**; Harry Shearer	George Michael; World War II fighter aircraft Films of the Coen brothers NBA 1976–present	3rd 4th 1st 2nd	31 December 2014
89	7	Jimmy McKenna; Gillian Joseph; **Dallas Campbell**; Russell Kane (2)	Frank Sinatra; Parables of the New Testament; Werner Herzog; Novels of Ernest Hemingway	2nd 4th 1st 3rd	2 January 2015
90	8	Gethin Jones; Ben Bailey Smith (1); **Aasmah Mir**; Mark Little	Welsh international rugby 2000–2010; Films of the Marx Brothers; Novels of Hanif Kureishi; Hunter S. Thompson	3rd 2nd 1st 4th	3 January 2015
91	9	Gemma Cairney; Anthony Ogogo; Tina Malone; **Dominic Laurie**	Spice Girls; British middleweight boxers of the 1990s Barbra Streisand; London Underground	3rd 2nd 4th 1st	11 January 2015
92	10	Tim Key; Andy McConnell; Amy Macdonald; **Richard Stilgoe**	Andy Murray; Joe Cocker; Still Game; British musicals up to 1980	=2nd 4th =2nd 1st	18 January 2015

=== Series 14 (2015–16) ===
No. overall	No. in series	Contestants	Specialist subjects	Pos.	Original release date
93	1	Ricky Hatton; Tony Singh; **Ardal O'Hanlon**; Kate Bliss	Only Fools and Horses; History of tartan The Velvet Underground; Peter Carl Fabergé	4th 3rd 1st 2nd	22 December 2015
94	2	Cheryl Fergison; Stacey Dooley; Kellie Maloney; **Jane Hazlegrove**	Elton John; Girls; British heavyweight boxing Harper Lee	4th 3rd 2nd 1st	23 December 2015
95	3	Radzi Chinyanganya (1); Badly Drawn Boy; **Rebecca Root**; Kriss Akabusi (1)	The Office (UK); Bruce Springsteen; Novels of Graham Greene; West Ham United F.C. 1985–present	=3rd 2nd 1st =3rd	24 December 2015
96	4	**Tom Kerridge**; Steph Houghton; Rob Delaney; Dominic Wood	Oasis; The Only Way Is Essex; John Belushi; Harry Houdini	1st 4th 3rd 2nd	28 December 2015
97	5	**Vincent Franklin**; Christian Malcolm; Chris Warburton; Graham Fellows	Pixar 1995–2014; Male Olympic sprinters 1989–present Reeves & Mortimer; Donald Crowhurst	1st 4th 2nd 3rd	29 December 2015
98	6	Liam Fox; Jon-Allan Butterworth; Nick Helm; **Kimberley Nixon**	Auf Wiedersehen, Pet; Terminator; Alice Cooper; Poirot novels of Agatha Christie	3rd 4th 2nd 1st	30 December 2015
99	7	Lisa Maxwell; Gary Delaney; **Simon Greenall**; Conor McNamara	Life and works of Judy Garland; Zombie films of George A. Romero; D-Day landings Irish whiskey	4th 2nd 1st 3rd	31 December 2015
100	8	Chris Hawkins; **Kate Williams**; Iain Stirling; Nikki Fox	Coronation Street; Emily Brontë; Films of Robin Williams; Kate Bush	2nd 1st 3rd 4th	2 January 2016
101	9	Louise Pentland; **Jason Cook**; Alistair Appleton; Ben Shires	Harry Potter novels Billy Connolly; Modern classical music Leeds United F.C.	4th 1st =2nd =2nd	4 January 2016
102	10	Katy Ashworth; Thomas Turgoose; Mick Fitzgerald; **Shelagh Fogarty**	Aretha Franklin; Prison Break; Cheltenham Festival; Pope John Paul II	=3rd =3rd 2nd 1st	9 January 2016

=== Series 15 (2016–17) ===
No. overall	No. in series	Contestants	Specialist subjects	Pos.	Original release date
103	1	Hacker T. Dog; **Paul Rankin**; Sonali Shah (1); Omid Djalili (1)	Pet Shop Boys; Stieg Larsson; Human body Chelsea F.C.	2nd 1st 3rd 4th	19 December 2016
104	2	Shappi Khorsandi (1); Chris Stark; **Piers Taylor**; Lee Pearson	Charlie Chaplin; Scott Mills; Bob Dylan; British birds	3rd 2nd 1st 4th	20 December 2016
105	3	Lauren Layfield (1); David Aaronovitch; **Tim Muffett**; Kadeena Cox	Jurassic Park films The Archers; Films of Danny Boyle; Arsenal F.C.	3rd 2nd 1st 4th	21 December 2016
106	4	**Mitch Benn**; Reeta Chakrabarti; Mark Rhodes; Alistair Brownlee	Peter Cook; John Keats; WWE in the 1990s Yorkshire Dales	1st 2nd 3rd 4th	22 December 2016
107	5	**Graeme Swann**; Rev. Kate Bottley; Janice Long; Paul Carrack	Original Star Wars trilogy Adrian Mole; Echo & the Bunnymen; Sheffield Wednesday F.C.	1st 3rd 4th 2nd	27 December 2016
108	6	Michelle Ackerley; **Joe Fattorini**; Danny Clarke; John Finnemore	Columbo; Meridian 2° west Garfield Sobers; Works of M. R. James	3rd 1st 4th 2nd	29 December 2016
109	7	Tyger Drew-Honey (1); Tom Ravenscroft; Maria McErlane (1); **Terry Deary**	The Office (UK); Warp Records; Unity Mitford; Father Brown stories	3rd 4th 2nd 1st	30 December 2016
110	8	Bryony Page; Nemone; **Emma Kennedy**; Alan Gardner	Disney films Works of Roald Dahl; Lucille Ball; Wassily Kandinsky	3rd 2nd 1st 4th	2 January 2017
111	9	Tom Heap; Jo Caulfield; Lutalo Muhammad; **Stuart MacBride**	The Godfather trilogy History of Edinburgh; Jack Johnson; A. A. Milne	2nd 3rd 4th 1st	7 January 2017
112	10	Nathan Caton; Dev Griffin; Adam Jones; **Patrick Grant**	Premier League; Films of Will Ferrell; British & Irish Lions; Ralph Lauren	3rd 4th 2nd 1st	14 January 2017

=== Series 16 (2017–18) ===
No. overall	No. in series	Contestants	Specialist subjects	Pos.	Original release date
113	1	Jack Ashton; Rich Hall; Guy Mowbray (1); **Pam Ayres**	The Ashes 2000–present Tennessee Williams; Iron Maiden; British wildlife	3rd 4th 2nd 1st	27 December 2017
114	2	Olivia Wayne; **Philip Serrell**; Richard McCourt; Lemn Sissay (1)	Children's books of Roald Dahl; England at the Six Nations 2000–present New Order; Life and times of Bob Marley	4th 1st =2nd =2nd	28 December 2017
115	3	**John Bradley**; Crista Cullen; Nick Bright; Anna Passey	Auf Wiedersehen, Pet; African mammals UK grime music War poetry of Wilfred Owen	1st 4th 3rd 2nd	29 December 2017
116	4	Rachel Stevens; Asim Chaudhry; **Anita Anand**; Andy Zaltzman (1)	Life and times of Rachel Green; The Notorious B.I.G. Emmeline Pankhurst; Victor Trumper	4th 3rd 1st 2nd	30 December 2017
117	5	Faisal Islam; **Lloyd Langford**; Yasmin Evans; Ollie Locke	Manchester United F.C. in the 1990s Robert Johnson; Luther Vandross; The Big Bang Theory	2nd 1st 4th 3rd	31 December 2017
118	6	Phil Williams; John Robins; Lydia Bright; **Tim Farron**	Dirty Harry films Queen; Sex and the City; Blackburn Rovers F.C. 1990–2000	3rd 2nd 4th 1st	3 January 2018
119	7	**Laurence Rickard**; Martin Hughes-Games; Vogue Williams; John Pienaar (1)	Indiana Jones films Life and novels of Evelyn Waugh; Kim Kardashian; William Gladstone	1st 3rd 4th 2nd	4 January 2018
120	8	Dane Baptiste (1); Grace Victory; Annie Wallace; **Martin Bell**	Marvel Cinematic Universe; Beyoncé; Doctor Who 1970–1980; William Howard Russell	3rd 4th 2nd 1st	5 January 2018
121	9	Spencer Kelly; Abdullah Afzal; Jessica Regan; **Andrew Maxwell**	UK number 1 singles 1983–1992; Alex Ferguson; Films of Quentin Tarantino; Lebanon	2nd 4th 3rd 1st	6 January 2018
122	10	Joanna Rowsell; Louis Payne; Eddie Butler; **George Lewis**	Harry Potter novels Arsenal F.C. under Arsène Wenger; Spanish Civil War; Oasis	3rd 4th 2nd 1st	13 January 2018

=== Series 17 (2018–19) ===
No. overall	No. in series	Contestants	Specialist subjects	Pos.	Original release date
123	1	Amol Rajan; **Rev. Richard Coles** (2); Courtney Act; Mark Lane	Shane Warne; Operas of Richard Wagner; Spice Girls; Piet Mondrian	2nd 1st =3rd =3rd	21 December 2018
124	2	Joe Pasquale (2); Ricky Boleto; **Toyah Willcox** (2); Jeanette Kwakye (1)	Werewolf films Number one singles of the 1990s Boudica; Walt Disney Animation Studios	3rd 4th 1st 2nd	22 December 2018
125	3	Shaun Ryder; Arabella Weir (2); Stef Reid; **Sean Fletcher**	Manchester; Motown; Jesus; Sesame Street	4th 3rd 2nd 1st	27 December 2018
126	4	Elis James; Montana Brown; Madeline Smith; **George Rainsford**	Wales national football team Desperate Housewives; Kew Gardens; Back to the Future	=2nd =2nd 4th 1st	29 December 2018
127	5 (Note: Despite this episode originally airing as the last episode in the series, it is still listed by the BBC as the fifth episode of the seventeenth (2018–19) series.)	Ana Matronic; **Joe Thomas**; Maggie Alphonsi; Jay Rayner (2)	The Bionic Woman; George Orwell; Denise Lewis; Arthur Freed	2nd 1st 4th 3rd	18 January 2019
128	6	Neil Jones; YolanDa Brown (1); **Paul Higgins**; Holly Hamilton (1)	Charlie Chaplin; Marvin Gaye; Watergate scandal George Best	4th 3rd 1st 2nd	2 January 2019
129	7	Mike Bushell (1); **Jenny Colgan**; Stanley Johnson; Vassos Alexander	Monty Python; Manhattan Project; Sophocles; Emil Zátopek	3rd 1st 4th 2nd	3 January 2019
130	8	**Candice Brown**; Jenny Meadows (2); Francis Boulle; Danny Sebastian	Audrey Hepburn; Challenge Cup; Friedrich Hayek; Only Fools and Horses	1st 4th 2nd 3rd	4 January 2019
131	9	Christian Brassington; Claudia-Liza Armah; **Edwina Currie** (2); Mark Dolan	Eric Cantona; Martin Scorsese; Nancy Astor; Elton John	2nd 4th 1st 3rd	5 January 2019
132	10	**Camilla Kerslake**; Monty Panesar; Sean Wilson; Terry Alderton	Andrew Lloyd Webber; Sikhism; British birds Tony Hancock	1st 4th 3rd 2nd	11 January 2019

=== Series 18 (2019–20) ===
No. overall	No. in series	Contestants	Specialist subjects	Pos.	Original release date
133	1	Tim Vine (2); Alastair Stewart (2); Hal Cruttenden (2); **Samira Ahmed** (2)	Jaws; Lewis Hamilton; Magnus Magnusson; Space: 1999	3rd 2nd 4th 1st	27 December 2019
134	2	Bronagh Waugh; Darren Harriott; **Adam Pearson**; Riyadh Khalaf	Fleabag; Kanye West; WWE in the 21st century Titanic (film)	4th 2nd 1st 3rd	28 December 2019
135	3	**Dylan Llewellyn**; Claire McCollum; Caspar Lee; Rickie Haywood-Williams	Films of Quentin Tarantino; 1980s light entertainment television YouTube; Game of Thrones	1st 3rd 4th 2nd	31 December 2019
136	4	Paul Chuckle; Amanda Henderson; **Geoff Norcott**; Levi Roots (2)	English football clubs Songs from animated Disney films Star Wars prequel trilogy Reggae music	2nd 4th 1st 3rd	2 January 2020
137	5	Carl Frampton; **Victoria Fritz**; Wayne Sleep (2); Rav Wilding (2)	The Office (UK); Chelsea Flower Show; Lilian Baylis; The Inbetweeners	4th 1st 3rd 2nd	3 January 2020
138	6	Ranj Singh; Jess Wright; Alan Johnson; **Katy Brand**	RuPaul's Drag Race; Monica Geller; Works of The Beatles; Dirty Dancing	3rd 2nd 4th 1st	15 February 2020
139	7	**Adrian Edmondson** (2); Yung Filly; Serena Guthrie; Gareth Thomas	Hannibal; Drake; Island of Jersey; Erasure	1st 4th 2nd 3rd	29 February 2020
140	8	Radzi Chinyanganya (2); Ruth Madeley; Ann Widdecombe; **Tom Read Wilson**	Olympic sprinters since 1980; Will & Grace; Escape of King Charles II; My Fair Lady	2nd 3rd 4th 1st	7 March 2020
141	9	Bez; Maya Sondhi; Darren Bent; **Elizabeth McKenna**	Bees and beekeeping Julie Walters; James Bond films Watson Fothergill	3rd 2nd 4th 1st	14 March 2020
142	10	Kelly Gallagher; Stephen Bailey; Daniel Lawrence Taylor; **Bobby Seagull**	Frank Lloyd Wright; Girl groups of the 1990s and 2000s Jurassic Park; England at the FIFA World Cup	2nd 3rd 4th 1st	4 April 2020

=== Series 19 (2020–21) ===
No. overall	No. in series	Contestants	Specialist subjects	Pos.	Original release date
143	1	Charlotte Crosby; Omid Djalili (2); **James Haskell**; Zoe Williams	Whales, dolphins, and porpoises Curb Your Enthusiasm; Harry Potter films Nelson Mandela	3rd 2nd 1st 4th	19 December 2020
144	2	Neil Hannon (1); Miles Jupp (2); Zoe Lyons (2); **Lucy Porter** (2)	Merchant Ivory's E. M. Forster film adaptations David Gower; Jacques Cousteau; Victoria Wood	2nd 4th 3rd 1st	28 December 2020
145	3	Stephen K. Amos (2); Matt Everitt; **Lucrezia Millarini**; Scarlett Moffatt	Fela Kuti; Glastonbury Festival; Die Hard; Bottom	3rd 2nd 1st 4th	30 December 2020
146	4	**Andrew Cotter**; Arielle Free; Crissy Rock (2); Lemn Sissay (2)	Smallfilms; Daft Punk; Pendle Witch Trials; Sylvia Pankhurst and Ethiopia	1st 4th 2nd 3rd	2 January 2021
147	5	Kimberly Wyatt; Darren Kennedy; Normski; **Aoife Hinds**	Bob Fosse; The Geisha; Electronic music from the 1980s and 1990s Amy Winehouse	2nd 4th 3rd 1st	16 January 2021
148	6	**Martin Roberts** (2); Fern Britton; Victoria Ekanoye; Arthur Williams	Thunderbirds; Mary of Teck; Pretty Woman; British military aircraft of the Second World War	1st 3rd 4th 2nd	6 February 2021
149	7	Jon Culshaw (2); Richie Anderson; **Rachel Johnson**; Denis Lawson	Doctor Who: the Jon Pertwee years The Saturdays; Laconia incident Early life of Miles Davis	2nd 4th 1st 3rd	20 February 2021
150	8	Joe Pasquale (3); Grace Dent; Mwaksy Mudenda; **Robin Ince**	Planet of the Apes films Edward VI; Gospel of Mark; The Young Ones	4th 2nd 3rd 1st	6 March 2021
151	9	Amanda Abbington; **Rick Edwards**; Richard Blackwood; Laura Tobin	Phoebe Buffay; Octopuses; An American Werewolf in London; Bon Jovi	4th 1st 2nd 3rd	20 March 2021
152	10	**Marcus Brigstocke**; Vick Hope; Briony May Williams; Siobhán McSweeney	Pink Floyd; Giraffes; Boy bands of the 1990s and 2000s Gene Wilder	1st 2nd 4th 3rd	27 March 2021
153	11	Steve Backshall (2); Noreen Khan; Rhys James; **Caroline Flint**	Sharks; Marilyn Monroe; The Office (US); Alien	3rd 2nd 4th 1st	3 April 2021
154	12	Amber Gill; **Rob Deering** (2); Ben Bailey Smith (2); Katie Razzall	How to Train Your Dragon; Stranger Things; Richard Pryor; Dora Maar	2nd 1st 4th 3rd	24 April 2021
155	13	Debbie McGee; Ben Cajee; Kiri Pritchard-McLean; **Tracy-Ann Oberman** (2)	Dame Margot Fonteyn; West Ham United 2000–2020; Inside No. 9 Women of Imperial Rome	3rd 2nd 4th 1st	1 May 2021
156	14	Kate Thornton (2); Nancy Lam; Dominic Skinner; **Katy Wix**	Dulwich; Rod Stewart; Alexander McQueen; Plays of Annie Baker	4th 2nd 3rd 1st	8 May 2021

=== Series 20 (2022) ===
No. overall	No. in series	Contestants	Specialist subjects	Pos.	Original release date
157	1	David James; Antony Costa (2); Jackie Weaver; **Ellie Taylor**	Roy Lichtenstein; Grease; The Chronicles of Riddick; Geri Halliwell	4th 3rd 2nd 1st	5 February 2022
158	2	Ruthie Henshall; Chris Mason; Poppy Jay; **Rufus Hound**	Gene Kelly musicals Yorkshire Dales; Cardi B Jim Henson	3rd 2nd 4th 1st	12 February 2022
159	3	Janette Manrara; Nish Kumar; **Olly Smith**; John Altman	Disney Renaissance era Jimi Hendrix; Withnail and I Isle of Wight	3rd 2nd 1st 4th	19 February 2022
160	4	**Roger Black** (2); Snoochie Shy; Anna Soubry; Natalie Anderson	The Princess Bride; Giggs; Fawlty Towers; Coco Chanel	1st 4th 2nd 3rd	26 February 2022
161	5	Maria McErlane (2); The Vivienne; **Martine Croxall**; DJ Ace	History of women on bicycles Cher; Nellie Bly; The Fresh Prince of Bel-Air	2nd =3rd 1st =3rd	5 March 2022
162	6	Philippa Dunne; **Phil Wang**; Keith Brymer Jones; Dani Harmer	The Shining; Wines of New Zealand; Dame Lucie Rie; RuPaul's Drag Race UK	2nd 1st 4th 3rd	12 March 2022
163	7	Nina Conti; **Brenton West**; Fatima Manji; Martel Maxwell	Stephen King's short fiction Formula One 1978–1987; Queen Victoria; Freddie Mercury	4th 1st 2nd 3rd	19 March 2022
164	8	Anne Diamond; Shivi Ramoutar; Eilidh McIntyre; **Chris McCausland**	Birth of British radar Sex and the City; Karl Lagerfeld; Pearl Jam	4th 2nd 3rd 1st	26 March 2022
165	9	**Jeremy Edwards** (2); Sonali Shah (2); Dave Rowntree; Camilla Tominey	Carrie Fisher; George Michael; Nikola Tesla; Back to the Future	1st 4th 2nd 3rd	2 April 2022
166	10	Sian Williams; **Sophie Duker**; Sonny Jay; Kellie Shirley	Anna Freud; The History Boys; One Direction; Abigail's Party	2nd 1st 4th 3rd	9 April 2022
167	11	Pat Nevin; Anna Nightingale; **Tom Malone, Jr.** Roo Irvine	Jeeves and Wooster; Oasis; Ricky Hatton; Pedigree cat breeds	=3rd 2nd 1st =3rd	16 April 2022
168	12	Martin Offiah (2); Shazia Mirza; **Owain Wyn Evans**; Amelle Berrabah	The Battle of Britain; George Carlin; Music of Britney Spears; Exploration of Mars	4th =2nd 1st =2nd	23 April 2022
169	13	Charlie Higson (2); **Adele Roberts**; Ed Gamble; Paul Cooper	Classic Western films Planets of the Solar System; 30 Rock; 1966 FIFA World Cup	=2nd 1st =2nd 4th	30 April 2022
170	14	James Acaster; Michelle Gayle; **Jean Johansson**; Charlotte Worthington	History of ice cream Def Jam Recordings; Kylie Minogue; Michael Jordan	3rd 2nd 1st 4th	7 May 2022

=== Series 21 (2022–23) ===
No. overall	No. in series	Contestants	Specialist subjects	Pos.	Original release date
171	1	Eshaan Akbar; Graeme Hall; **Claire Richards**; Amy Tapper	Nusrat Fateh Ali Khan; Donald Campbell; Karen Carpenter; Films of Adam Sandler	3rd 2nd 1st 4th	5 November 2022
172	2	Emma Vardy; Cheryl Baker (1); **Nikesh Patel**; David O'Doherty	History of surfing Classic Disney films Scrubs; Tour de France in the 20th century	3rd 4th 1st 2nd	12 November 2022
173	3	Diarmuid Gavin (2); Melissa Johns; **Adam Fleming**; Angela Barnes	History of the White House; Spice Girls; James Bond: the Roger Moore years British brutalist architecture	3rd 4th 1st 2nd	10 December 2022
174	4	Victoria Smurfit; Wayne Hemingway (2); **Ria Lina**; James Buckley	The Breakfast Club; History of charity shops Rosalind Franklin; The Office (UK)	=3rd 2nd 1st =3rd	14 January 2023
175	5	Andrea McLean; **Colin Hoult**; Rhys Stephenson; Hannah Cockroft (2)	The Sound of Music; History of DC Comics; Heart; Shopaholic novels of Sophie Kinsella	2nd 1st =3rd =3rd	21 January 2023
176	6	**Bobby Davro**; Suzie Lee; Graham Bell; Remi Burgz	Gilbert O'Sullivan; Bridget Jones; Stevie Ray Vaughan; Salmon	1st 4th 2nd 3rd	4 February 2023
177	7	Debra Stephenson; **James O'Brien**; Shaparak Khorsandi (2); Sam McKnight	John Lennon; Books of J. D. Salinger; The Adventures of Asterix; 1970s disco music	3rd 1st 4th 2nd	18 February 2023
178	8	Yvette Fielding (2); Helen McGinn; Matt Richardson; **Sarah Keith-Lucas**	Morecambe and Wise; Hollywood novels of Jackie Collins; Concorde; Labyrinth	4th 3rd 2nd 1st	4 March 2023
179	9	Jayne Middlemiss; **Neil Delamere**; Harpreet Kaur; Amar Latif	Duran Duran; Vikings; The Wolf of Wall Street; Sam Cooke	3rd 1st 2nd 4th	11 March 2023
180	10	**Ricky Groves** (2); Harriet Kemsley; Verity Bowditch; Bonnie Greer	James Bond themes Sloths; David Attenborough; Hattie McDaniel	1st 4th 3rd 2nd	25 March 2023
181	11	**John Pienaar** (2); Rick Witter; Suzi Ruffell; Dakota Blue Richards	Clement Attlee; The Smiths; Films of Sandra Bullock; Music of Lana Del Rey	1st 4th 3rd 2nd	1 April 2023
182	12	Dr Hilary Jones; Danni Menzies; Kitty Scott-Claus; **Niamh McGrady**	Discovery of penicillin Rosemary Smith; Girls Aloud; Bluey	2nd 3rd 4th 1st	15 April 2023
183	13	**Alistair McGowan** (2); Chris Dixon; Laura Lexx; Holly Hamilton (2)	Claude Debussy; British birds of prey History of alternative comedy Matilda	1st 3rd 2nd 4th	22 April 2023
184	14	Mark Foster (2); Dane Baptiste (2); **Ali Plumb**; Arabella Weir (3)	Madness; Scarface; The Hitchhiker's Guide to the Galaxy (radio); Sophie Tucker	4th 2nd 1st 3rd	29 April 2023

=== Series 22 (2023–24) ===
No. overall	No. in series	Contestants	Specialist subjects	Pos.	Original release date
185	1	**Rosie Jones**; Gemma Bradley; Dan Gillespie Sells; Andy Goldstein	Dinnerladies; Iron Man films Bernie Taupin; Goodfellas	1st 4th =2nd =2nd	24 November 2023
186	2	Danny O'Carroll; **Cheddar Gorgeous**; Brendan Sheerin; Jayde Adams	Robbie Keane; Mythical creatures of the British Isles; Sagrada Família; Buffy the Vampire Slayer	4th 1st 2nd 3rd	1 December 2023
187	3	Nick Pickard; Karen Bardsley; Harpz Kaur; **Terry Christian** (2)	Star Trek: The Next Generation; Films of Will Ferrell; Diljit Dosanjh; Manchester United under Tommy Docherty	4th 2nd 3rd 1st	15 December 2023
188	4	Jane Hill; Mica Ven; **Dr Amir Khan**; Jamie MacDonald	Music of ABBA; Films of Eddie Murphy; TLC; Adrian Mole books by Sue Townsend	2nd 3rd 1st 4th	20 December 2023
189	5	Andrew Roachford; **Sara Barron**; Jo Coffey; Jason Mohammad	Music of Stevie Wonder; Guys and Dolls; J. R. Ewing; Films of Al Pacino	4th 1st 2nd 3rd	21 December 2023
190	6	Troy Deeney; Jasmine Harman; **OJ Borg** (2); Dana	Sam Raimi's Spider-Man trilogy Prince; Wayne's World; UK hit singles 1969–1976	3rd 2nd 1st 4th	22 December 2023
191	7	John Whaite; Humza Arshad; Ria Hebden; **Andy Zaltzman** (2)	Chandler Bing; Boxing career of Tyson Fury; Feature films of Ava DuVernay; Auguste Rodin	2nd 3rd 4th 1st	5 January 2024
192	8	**Ruth Davidson**; Pat Sharp; Fats Timbo; Jay Rayner (3)	Joan of Arc; Austin Powers; Tina Turner; Blossom Dearie	1st 3rd 4th 2nd	12 January 2024
193	9	Jonathan Agnew; YolanDa Brown (2); **Davood Ghadami**; Jessica Knappett	History of cakes Disney's Descendants films Battle of Thermopylae; The Fast Show	4th 2nd 1st 3rd	26 January 2024
194	10	Lee Latchford-Evans; **Rachel Parris**; Harry Pinero; Lauren Layfield (2)	Top Gun films Adaptations of Jane Austen novels Lewis Hamilton; Arctic Monkeys	3rd 1st 4th 2nd	2 February 2024
195	11	Michelle Heaton; **Nihal Arthanayake** (2); Aaron Evans; Maisie Adam	Disney princesses Rise of Public Enemy; Cephalopods; This Is England	=3rd 1st =3rd 2nd	16 February 2024
196	12	Paul Burrell; Natalie Ann Jamieson; **Amber Butchart**; Dean McCullough	Bette Davis; Absolutely Fabulous; History of the British seaside Steps	3rd 2nd 1st 4th	23 February 2024
197	13	Tricia Penrose; Karim Zeroual; Catherine Bohart; **Gavin Ramjaun**	Madonna in the 1980s Films of Jim Carrey; Vita Sackville-West; Mission: Impossible films	3rd 4th 2nd 1st	8 March 2024
198	14	John Thomson (2); Poppy O'Toole; **Ivo Graham**; Mark Pougatch	Star Wars: The Original Trilogy; History of potatoes Films of Philip Seymour Hoffman; The Men's Ashes in the 21st Century	3rd 4th 1st 2nd	22 March 2024

=== Series 23 (2024–25) ===
No. overall	No. in series	Contestants	Specialist subjects	Pos.	Original release date
199	1	Jennie Bond; Des Clarke; Nabil Abdulrashid; **Abby Cook**	Peppa Pig; Stephen Hendry; Bruce Lee; Sherlock	4th 3rd 2nd 1st	23 December 2024
200	2	Rustie Lee; Ashley Storrie; Ignacio Lopez; **Paul Gorton**	South Pacific; Star Trek: Voyager; Trent Reznor & Nine Inch Nails; After Life	4th 2nd 3rd 1st	24 December 2024
201	3	Kriss Akabusi (2); Nikita Kanda; **Mike Bubbins**; Lindsey Santoro	Friedrich Nietzsche; Whitney Houston; James Garner; Gimme Gimme Gimme	2nd 4th 1st 3rd	26 December 2024
202	4	**Liz Kershaw**; Jon Lee; Charley Marlowe; Emmanuel Sonubi	Milton Keynes; Nighty Night; Jane McDonald; Twilight books	1st 2nd 3rd 4th	27 December 2024
203	5	Jake Wood; Sindhu Vee; Val Garland; **Hammed Animashaun**	Caligula; Jacqueline Kennedy Onassis; Dame Vivienne Westwood; The Office (US)	=3rd =3rd 2nd 1st	29 December 2024
204	6	Kelly Somers; Adam James; Thanyia Moore; **Steve Brown**	Melanie C Lando Norris; Jamaican cuisine Owls	3rd 2nd 4th 1st	30 December 2024
205	7	Eddie Kadi; **Kate Butch**; Sammy Winward; Olga Koch	Alex Ferguson; The Shrek films Anne Boleyn; American Pie films	4th 1st 3rd 2nd	31 December 2024
206	8	Bill Fellows; Ruby Bhogal; Tori Allen-Martin; **Matt Forde**	Ziggy Stardust; Claude Monet; Destiny's Child; Nottingham Forest F.C. 1977–1993	2nd 4th 3rd 1st	1 January 2025
207	9	Ore Oduba (2); John O'Farrell; **Jeanette Kwakye** (2); Lloyd Griffith	Pete Sampras; Profumo affair Ian Wright; English Anglican Cathedrals	3rd 2nd 1st 4th	2 January 2025
208	10	Athena; **Kieran Hodgson**; Lindsay Armaou; Kae Kurd	Ridley Scott film Gladiator; Gustav Mahler; Martin McDonagh; David Beckham	3rd 1st 4th 2nd	3 January 2025
209	11	**Jon Kay**; Beattie Edmondson; Suzanne Shaw; Glenn Moore	The Young Ones; The Strokes; Joey Tribbiani; Paul Thomas Anderson	1st 3rd 4th 2nd	6 January 2025
210	12	Danny Miller; Josie d'Arby (2); **Elizabeth Rizzini**; Qasa Alom	Julia Donaldson; Gospel of John; Celine Dion; AC Milan under Carlo Ancelotti	4th 3rd 1st 2nd	13 January 2025
211	13	Guy Mowbray (2); **Kirsten O'Brien** (2); Tyger Drew-Honey (2); Justine Greening	Viking York; Life of Daphne du Maurier; The IT Crowd; Judge John Bradshaw	=3rd 1st =3rd 2nd	20 January 2025
212	14	Seann Walsh; Romy Gill; **Daliso Chaponda**; Fiona O'Carroll	Original Ghostbusters films Kapil Dev; Babylon 5 History of tea	3rd 4th 1st 2nd	27 January 2025

=== Series 24 (2025–26) ===
No. overall	No. in series	Contestants	Specialist subjects	Pos.	Original release date
213	1	Maryam Moshiri; Chesney Hawkes; Desiree Burch; **Danny Robins**	Bridget Jones (film series); The White Album by The Beatles; Viola Davis; The Mandalorian	2nd 3rd 4th 1st	22 December 2025
214	2	Sally Ann Matthews; Yinka Bokinni; **Felicity Ward**; Michael Bradley	Chitty Chitty Bang Bang; Sharks; Pixies (band); It's a Wonderful Life	3rd 4th 1st 2nd	23 December 2025
215	3	**Gareth Malone**; Gamba Cole; Yewande Biala; Lucy Beaumont	Robert Schumann's Year of Song; Rush Hour (film series); SZA; Les Dawson	1st 3rd 2nd 4th	24 December 2025
216	4	**Will Best**; Laura Smyth; Nikita Kuzmin; Jayne Wisener	Danny Dyer; Films of Baz Luhrmann; Cristiano Ronaldo; Terri Hooley	1st 2nd 3rd 4th	26 December 2025
217	5	Fire; Matt Edmondson; Sonnaz Nooranvary; **Lewis Goodall**	Music of Lauryn Hill; History of board games Robert Langdon novels of Dan Brown; John Adams	=2nd =2nd 4th 1st	28 December 2025
218	6	Dean Franklin; Chloe Petts; **Ashley John-Baptiste**; Robyn Cowen	The Hangover (film series); The Vicar of Dibley; Donny Hathaway; Original Karate Kid Trilogy	=3rd 2nd 1st =3rd	29 December 2025
219	7	Iwan Thomas; Sophie Aldred; **Mobeen Azhar**; Ashley James	Forrest Gump; Sylvester McCoy; Sign o' the Times by Prince; Lady Constance Bulwer-Lytton	2nd =3rd 1st =3rd	30 December 2025
220	8	**Tia Kofi**; Lauren Patel; Josh Jones; Izzie Balmer	Doctor Who: Ninth incarnation La La Land; Lady Jane Grey; Guinea pigs	1st 2nd 4th 3rd	31 December 2025
221	9	**Charlotte Hawkins**; Stephen Bailey; Ekow Quartey; Belles Berry	André Rieu; Cheryl; Arsenal's 'Invincibles' season Nicholas Culpeper	1st 3rd 2nd 4th	1 January 2026
222	10	Colson Smith; Nadia Jae; **Grace Campbell**; Joel M	Leeds United under Marcelo Bielsa; Marvel's Avengers films Robin Williams; Derren Brown	2nd 4th 1st 3rd	2 January 2026
223	11	Alexander Dragonetti; **Janine Harouni**; Laura Davies; Greg McHugh	Subterranean London; Toy Story films Playing career of Steven Gerrard; Original Indiana Jones trilogy	2nd 1st =3rd =3rd	5 January 2026
224	12	JB Gill; **Susie McCabe**; Lucy Shepherd; Richie Anderson (2)	The Bad Boys films Margaret Thatcher; Ranulph Fiennes; Melanie B	=2nd 1st 4th =2nd	12 January 2026
225	13	**James Cracknell**; Jen Brister; Craig Rowe; Bradley Riches	Grigori Rasputin; Tina Fey; Grace Jones; The Little Shop of Horrors	1st =2nd =2nd 4th	19 January 2026
226	14	**Stuart Pearce**; Gemma Cairney; Axel Blake; Phil Dunning	UK Punk Rock 1976-1979; Pamela Colman Smith; The History of Marvel Comics; Paul O’Grady	1st 3rd 4th 2nd	26 January 2026
