= History of Preston North End F.C. =

History of an English football club

Chart showing the progress of Preston North End F.C. through the English football league system.

Preston North End is an English football club in Preston, Lancashire which traces its origins to a local cricket club formed c.1863. This club moved to Deepdale in January 1875. They started playing football as a winter activity in 1878 and, in May 1880, took the decision to focus on football. Progress was rapid and the club became professional in 1883. They were a founder member of the Football League in 1888 and won the first two league championships in 1888–89 and 1889–90. Their team in 1888–89 also won the FA Cup and so became the first to achieve "The Double" in English football. In addition, the team was unbeaten in all first-class matches played that season and are referred to as "The Old Invincibles". Preston have had a chequered existence since 1890 and have won only one more major trophy, the 1937–38 FA Cup, when Bill Shankly was a key member of the team.

Tom Finney was Preston's player who joined the club as a teenager in 1938. His first team debut was delayed until 1946 by the Second World War but he played for Preston until he retired in 1960. He made 76 international appearances from 1946 to 1958. A year after Finney retired, Preston were relegated to the Second Division and, since then, have not yet returned to top flight English football.

Preston had a memorable season in 1963–64 when, managed by former player Jimmy Milne, they reached the 1964 FA Cup Final and finished third in the Second Division. They were first relegated to the Third Division after the 1969–70 season. Although they won promotion again immediately, the team have spent 28 of the 49 seasons since 1970 in the bottom two divisions, including a span of nineteen seasons from 1981–82 to 1999–2000. The club experienced a near-terminal decline in the 1980s which brought about the very real threat of closure, the nadir being the 1985–86 season when they finished 23rd in the Fourth Division and had to seek re-election to the league. They recovered and won promotion back to the Third Division only a year later but it was a false dawn as the team spent another three years in the bottom division from 1993 to 1996. The club finally began to recover and move forward after a takeover by BAXI in 1994 but their ownership ended in June 2002. The team was established at second tier level through the 2000s but more problems arose at the end of the decade with an Inland Revenue winding-up order in 2010 and relegation to the third tier in 2011. The taxation issue was resolved by local businessman Trevor Hemmings, already a shareholder, who bought a controlling interest in June 2010. The team were promoted again in 2015 and have been placed in the EFL Championship since then.

Deepdale has been a football venue from 1878 and is the world's oldest football ground in terms of continuous use by a club in a major league. When BAXI took control, they embarked on an investment programme which had the main goal of upgrading Deepdale into a modern stadium. The old ground was demolished and rebuilt in four stages and the last of the new stands was opened in 2008. Part of the redevelopment was the original National Football Museum which opened at Deepdale in 2001, though it closed in 2010 due to funding issues and was relocated to Manchester in 2012.

== Early days (1863 to 1886) ==
=== Origin as a cricket team ===
The club's origin has been traced to a cricket team that was founded c.1863 in Preston and was linked to the Wellfield Road School. At first, this team played on a strip of land called "The Marsh", on the Ribble Estuary at Ashton-on-Ribble, which is now a suburb in the western part of the town. In 1863, some team members proposed a move to Moor Park, where Preston Corporation had opened new playing fields. This caused a split but those in favour of the move went anyway and formed Preston North End Cricket Club, so called because Moor Park is on the north side of town. The first club president was George Howarth. On 3 August 1867, William Sudell, then aged sixteen, became a member.

=== Foundation of the football club ===
The club had ongoing financial difficulties but managed to keep going and, in spite of their problems, decided on 21 January 1875 to take lease on a field at Deepdale Farm. Partly to try and earn extra income and partly to have a fitness activity through the winter months, the club formed a rugby team in 1877–78. This was not a success and they turned to association football in 1878–79. Their earliest known match took place on 5 October 1878 against Eagley F.C. and Preston lost 0–1. It was played at Deepdale which has thus become the world's oldest football ground in continuous use by a major league club (the second oldest is Turf Moor, first used by Burnley on 17 February 1883). Preston's team in the match against Eagley was: W. Sudell, W. Turner, J. Sefton, T. Charnley, T. Wadeson, J. Wadeson, C. Miller, T. Parkinson, J. F. Dodgson, R. Green and H. S. Carmel (captain).

In May 1880, aware of the success of other Lancashire football teams, team captain Harry Carmel proposed the formal establishment of the football club. Support was unanimous. The new club is known to have played ten games in the 1880–81 season, including one on 26 March 1881 against Blackburn Rovers in which Preston were beaten 10–0. The club continued to play cricket in summer but the members were in no doubt that football was the club's future.

=== Professionalism (1881–1886) ===
Over the next few years, Deepdale gradually improved its facilities and increased in size. Football had become a major attraction in the town and Sudell, who was now the man at the helm of the club, had a vision of how to make Preston North End the best team in England.

Sudell's plan was to 'import' top players from other areas, primarily Scotland - which provided talent for many English clubs of the time in the form of the Scotch Professors. The identity of the club's first Scottish player was James McDade who "turned up in Preston and began to educate the locals". He travelled South from the Neilston area of Glasgow and was living in Preston in 1881. At the outset he was one of the club's best players, he turned out in the team against Astley Bridge in November 1880 and was a member of the team through 1881 and 1882. Since he was coming to the end of his career his main influence was as North End's first coach and strategist. Other Scots were to follow and they were to be rewarded by being paid match fees and being 'accommodated' with highly paid work in the Preston area, a practice which was not uncommon among the Lancashire clubs.

This led to accusations of professionalism from Preston's rivals. In 1884 for instance, Upton Park, who arrived at Deepdale for a FA Cup tie, complained to the Football Association that their opponents had fielded a team packed with Scottish professionals. North End withdrew from the tournament, but a threat from thirty-six northern teams to break away and form a rival football association forced the FA to legalise professionalism in 1885.

== Halcyon days (1886 to 1893) ==
=== 1886 to 1888 ===
This period saw the development and supremacy of a team that became known as "The Old Invincibles". The players were mostly recruited from north of the border as was the case with Nick Ross, his younger brother Jimmy Ross, David Russell, John Goodall and Geordie Drummond. There were some local players, such as full back Bob Holmes and winger Fred Dewhurst.

During this time, Preston beat Hyde 26–0 in the first round of the FA Cup in 1887–88, which to this day remains an English first-class football record.

They played Hibernian F.C. in 1887 World Championship losing 2–1 in Edinburgh.

=== Champions (1888–90) ===
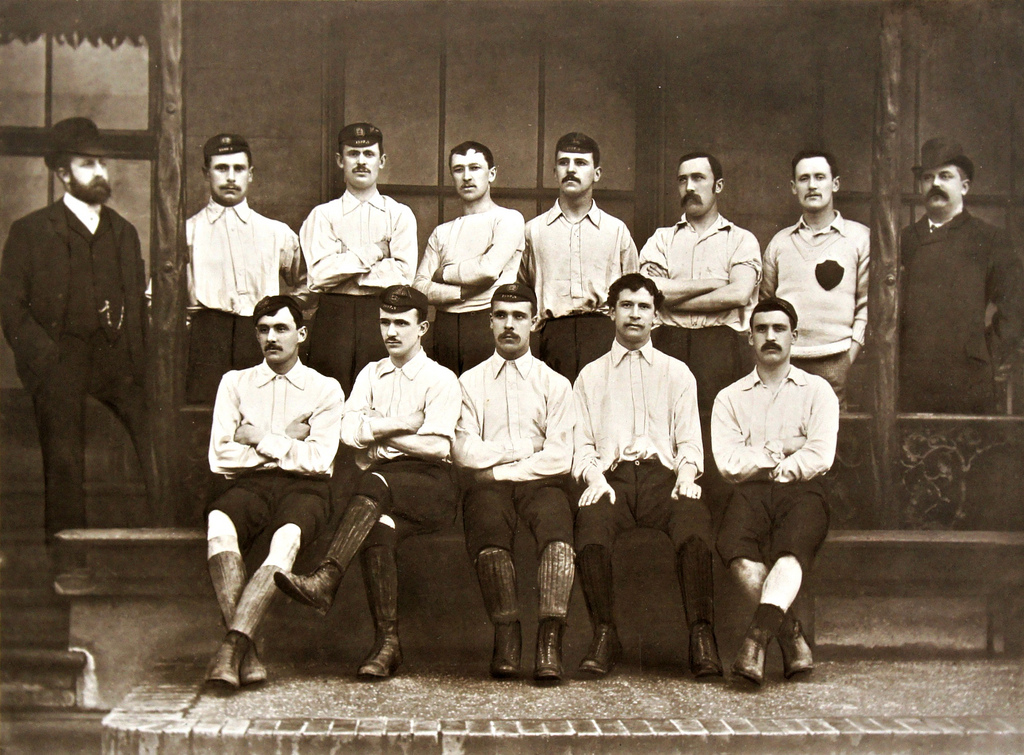
The team pictured in March 1888.

The Football League was founded in 1888; North End were one of the founder members and went on to make history. In the League's first season (1888–89), North End were inaugural league champions, achieving the feat without losing a match. On top of this, they completed the league and cup 'Double', winning the FA Cup without conceding a single goal, defeating Wolverhampton Wanderers 3–0 in the final. Preston were the first club to achieve the league and cup "Double" and they did so with a majority of their team being made up of "Scotch Professors" - as the professional Scottish players of the time were known.

In 1889–90 Sudell's team repeated the feat in the League, but it wasn't long before rival teams improved. Despite many close calls, North End would never match The Old Invincibles' feat by winning the Football League Championship again.

=== 1890 to 1893 ===
Despite the Old Invincibles team being gradually dismantled, Preston continued to perform well in the league, finishing runners-up first to Everton and then twice in succession to Sunderland. In 1892–93 a second division was initiated, along with the first ever promotion/relegation 'play-off' system. This meant that the top three in Division Two would each play a one-off 'test match' against a team finishing in the bottom three in the top flight.

In the 1892–93 FA Cup, Preston reached the semi-finals and were drawn against Everton, the tie to be played at Bramall Lane. It was a 2–2 draw and a replay was necessary. This took place at Ewood Park and was goalless. A second replay was arranged at Trent Bridge and this time Preston lost 1–2.

== 1893 to 1904 ==
=== First Division (1893–1901) ===
In 1893–94 Preston plummeted down the league to finish third from bottom (14th), requiring them to beat Notts County in the end-of-season test match to retain their top-flight status. This they did, defeating the Magpies 4–0 at Deepdale.

This era saw the transfer of some of the club's better players. Nick Ross signed for Everton, John Goodall went to Derby County and Thomson to Wolves.

However, two more significant events were rather more tragic for the club. First, in 1893 William Sudell lost his control of the club and it was established as a limited liability company.

Then two of the Old Invincibles died at early ages. Firstly, Nick Ross, who had returned to Deepdale from Everton after only one year, succumbed to Tuberculosis. Then, Fred Dewhurst died.

=== Second Division (1901–1904) ===
North End were finally relegated in 1901. They were Second Division champions in 1903–04 and gained promotion back to the top flight.

== 1904 to 1915 ==
Deepdale was enlarged to accommodate larger attendances as football nationwide increased in popularity. Among Preston's players at this time were centre-half Joe McCall, Peter McBride (who is second only to Alan Kelly Sr. in the list of North End's record league appearance makers with 443) and winger Dickie Bond.

=== 1904–06 ===
Preston finished as runners-up to Liverpool in 1905–06.

=== 1906–11 ===
Preston dropped down the First Division table and their best performance in this period was finishing tenth in 1908–09.

=== "Yo-yo" seasons (1911–15) ===
Preston were relegated in 1911–12 but immediately bounced back by winning the Second Division championship for the second time in 1912–13. They were still not good enough for the First Division and were immediately re-relegated in 1913–14. Despite the outbreak of World War I in August 1914, the 1914–15 season was completed and Preston finished second to regain immediate promotion but it would be more than four years before they could return to the First Division.

The onset of war eventually brought a halt to British football in the country and many players enlisted in the armed forces. A Footballers' Battalion was formed in December 1914 and grounds were used as volunteering points.

== 1919 to 1930 ==
=== Division One (1919–25) ===
Despite the fact that several regional competitions ran during the First World War, it was not until September 1919 that English league football returned.

North End struggled for the most part of the inter-war period, with the club finishing first 19th and then 16th for three consecutive seasons before finally being relegated in 1924–25.

Relegation coincided with the man who had been at the helm of the club, James Isherwood Taylor, being banned from the club by the FA after he had made illegal approaches for players, although he returned in 1925. Taylor arrived on the board in 1912, and became an increasingly influential figurehead at Deepdale, at a time when many other clubs were beginning to employ specialist team managers.

=== Division Two (1925–30) ===
Despite lean times in the league, North End very nearly experienced glory in the FA Cup. After reaching the semi-finals in 1921, they went one better a year later by qualifying to face Huddersfield Town in the final at Stamford Bridge - the last one before the opening of Wembley Stadium. In a poor game, Billy Smith was felled on the edge of the North End box, and despite fierce protests, the referee signalled for a spot-kick. Smith converted, despite the best efforts of bespectacled goalkeeper J.F. Mitchell to put him off by jumping up and down on his line. The cup was lost.

Unlike before the war, North End found it extremely difficult to bounce back to the top flight. In their first season in League Division Two they finished 12th, followed by 6th, 4th, 13th and 16th in 1929–30.

== 1930 to 1939 ==
=== Division Two (1930–34) ===
It was not until 1934 that Preston finally returned to Division One, finishing runners-up behind Grimsby Town in 1933–34. This was Bill Shankly's first season after being signed from Carlisle United in May 1933.

At many points during the club's nine seasons in Division Two, relegation seemed quite likely. However, Taylor averted this potential disaster by signing two forwards from Tottenham Hotspur in the shape of Ted Harper and Dick Rowley in the winter of 1931. In 1932–33, Harper scored 37 goals, a club record which still stands.

During this period, Taylor also made some notable improvements to the ground. The Pavilion Stand was opened in 1934, housing offices, dressing rooms, boardroom and guest rooms.

=== Division One (1934–39) ===
On the pitch, the policy of signing players from north of the border continued. Jimmy Milne and Shankly would be the ones joining the club. With two new players, Preston began performing in the First Division and reaching the FA Cup final in 1938.

=== FA Cup (1937–38) ===
Again, the opponents were Huddersfield Town, with the outcome again decided by a penalty, George Mutch firing into the roof of the net after being unfairly challenged by Terriers defender Alf Young in the last minute of extra time. This was the last time North End won a major domestic trophy.

== The Tom Finney era (1946 to 1961) ==
=== First Division (1946–1949) ===
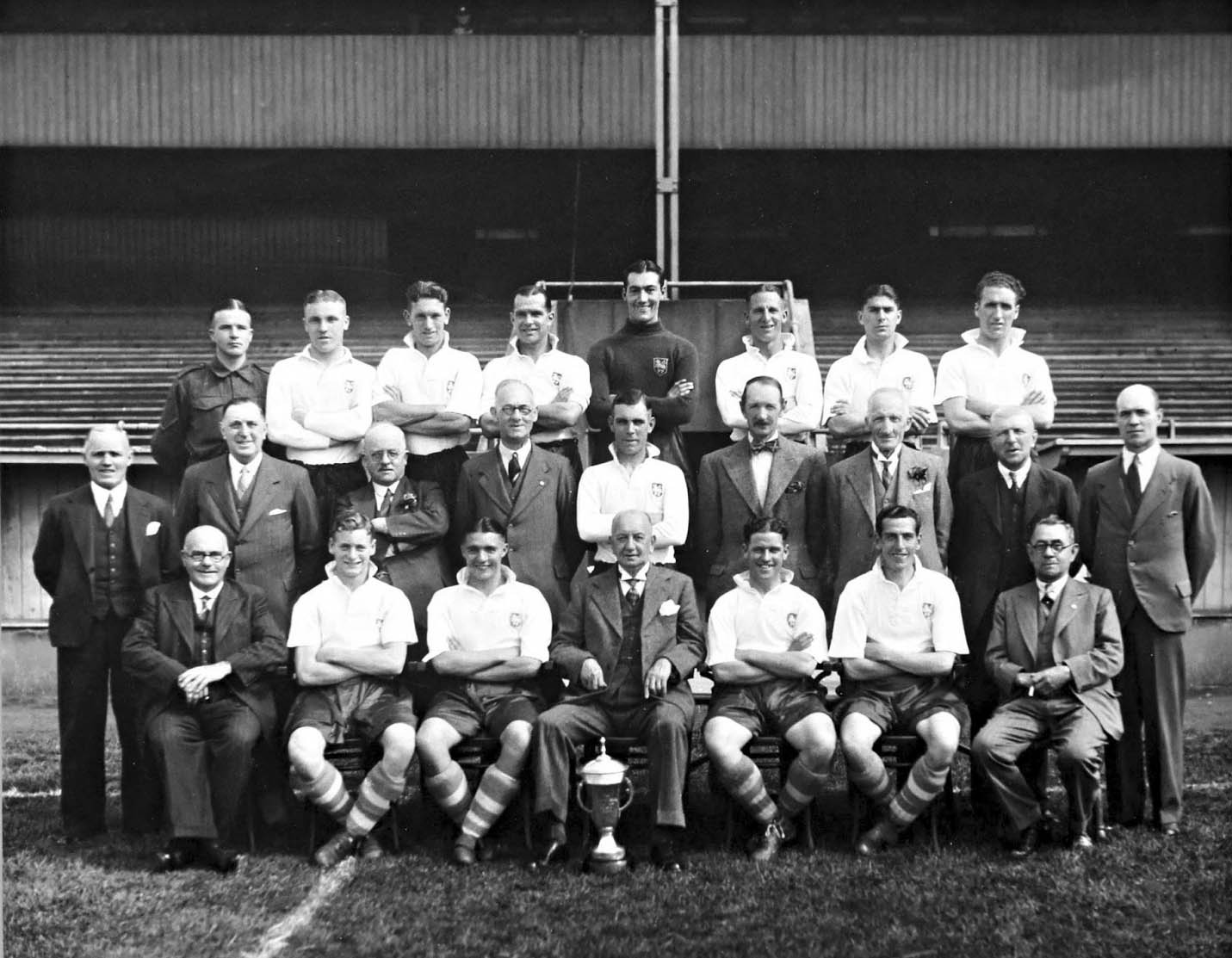
Preston North End team of 1941

Although football continued through the war, Tom Finney was 24 years old when he made his official league debut for North End. However, many of the older Lilywhites' players had retired, having been deprived of eight years of their careers. Three North End players, Jack Owen, Percival Taylor and David Willacy were killed during the war.

=== Second Division (1949–1951) ===
Despite the setback of relegation in 1949, they bounced back within two seasons, setting themselves up for a prosperous time in the 1950s. However, they failed to win any further major domestic honours despite coming close on several occasions.

=== First Division (1951–1956) ===
Much is made of Finney's unstinting loyalty to the club and town, but in 1952 North End came agonisingly close to losing their greatest-ever player. English players moving to play abroad had hitherto been unheard of, but the decision of England international Neil Franklin to sign for Bogotá in Colombia in 1950 suggested that First Division stars were indeed attainable.

With this in mind, the Italian club Palermo offered Finney a signing on fee of £10,000, a basic salary of £130 per month, bonuses, a villa and a car. The signing on fee alone represented around ten years of earnings in English football. Finney urged the board to consider allowing him to speak to them, but his request was rejected.

Despite this, Finney continued to play for the club, and the following year he almost reaped his reward. With two games remaining of the 1952/53 season, North End were locked in a three-way title battle with Arsenal and Wolves. As Wolves lost form at the crucial moment, Preston defeated the Gunners 2–0 at Deepdale.

After another win over Derby County in midweek, it all came down to Arsenal's match against Burnley on the Friday. Arsenal won 3–2, pipping the Lilywhites to the First Division championship by a slender 0.1 of a goal.

A devastated North End managed to bounce back the following season, however. Despite finishing eleventh in the league, they reached the FA Cup final, where they would face West Bromwich Albion. and lost 3–2.

At one stage in the Wembley showpiece, North End led 2–1 thanks to goals from Angus Morrison and Charlie Wayman. A penalty conceded by Tommy Docherty and a late goal from Frank Griffin who slipped the ball under goalkeeper George Thompson turned the game, and for the second time in two seasons Preston were English football's nearly men.

=== Cliff Britton, manager (1956–1961) ===
For the rest of the decade, the Tom Finney-inspired outfit entertained crowds up and down the country with fast, attacking football.

In 1960, with injuries beginning to get the better of him, Finney made the decision to retire. He played his last game in front of almost 30,000 supporters after a 2–0 victory over Luton Town. Fears that the end of Finney's playing career would prompt a downturn in the club's fortunes proved justified when they were relegated the following season. Britton resigned. Preston North End have not yet returned to the top flight of English football.

== 1961 to 1970 ==
=== Jimmy Milne, manager (1961–1968) ===
As Dave Russell points out in his book Preston North End: 100 Years in the Football League, one event took place in this period which would make it virtually impossible for North End to find the wages to compete with the elite in attracting top players. In 1960, the PFA, led by Jimmy Hill voted overwhelmingly to go on strike in an attempt to see the abolition of the maximum wage. When the Football League finally relented, wages increased greatly, and young players developed by the smaller clubs as a way around this difficulty were lured away or sold in order to reduce debts.

However, North End still managed to reach the FA Cup Final in 1964. Their opponents this time were to be West Ham United, who contained future World Cup winners Bobby Moore and Geoff Hurst. Considering the Lilywhites' Second Division status, they started the game as clear underdogs. Despite this, and containing the youngest player in FA Cup Final history in seventeen-year-old Howard Kendall, Jimmy Milne's side looked the likely winners for long periods, taking the lead twice through Doug Holden and Alex Dawson. However West Ham proved too strong in the end and a last-minute winner by Ronnie Boyce saw the Londoners home 3–2.

=== Bobby Seith, manager (1968–1970) ===
Following the cup final defeat, the sales of Kendall, Dawson and Dave Wilson saw the club relegated to the Third Division for the first time in its history in 1970 after a defeat by local rivals Blackpool, who in the process confirmed their own promotion.

== 1970 to 1981 ==
=== Alan Ball, manager (1970–1973) ===
New manager Alan Ball senior ensured that North End bounced straight back up as champions. Promotion was secured after Easter with a Ricky Heppolette goal in a 1–0 victory over the then-leaders Fulham. Preston struggled in the Second Division and narrowly avoided relegation in both 1972 and 1973. Ball left in 1973 and was succeeded by Bobby Charlton.

=== Bobby Charlton, manager (1973–1975) ===
The club was relegated under Bobby Charlton in 1973–74 and finished ninth in 1974–75. Charlton then resigned in protest over the sale of John Bird to Newcastle United

=== Harry Catterick, manager (1975–1977) ===
Harry Catterick, the former Everton manager, took over for two seasons in which the team finished eighth and sixth. In the first round of the 1977 FA Cup, Preston needed two replays to dispose of Crewe Alexandra. The original tie at Gresty Road was drawn 1–1 and the first replay at Deepdale 2–2. The decider was held at Anfield and Preston won 3–0. It was all to no avail as they lost 1–0 to Halifax Town at The Shay in the second round.

=== Nobby Stiles, manager (1977–1981) ===
Promotion was won under Nobby Stiles in 1977–78, inspired by the likes of goalkeeper Roy Tunks, defender Mick Baxter, midfielder Gordon Coleman and the dynamic strike force of Alex Bruce and Mike Elwiss. At the same time the emerging Michael Robinson was sold for a club record fee of £765,000 to Manchester City, whilst Alan Spavin retired.

In 1980–81, Preston were relegated back to the Third Division in 20th place (on goal difference). Many players left the club along with manager Stiles after the end of the season, new manager Tommy Docherty making wholesale changes. These were not for the better and the events of the early 1980s would take the club perilously close to destruction.

== Hard times (1981 to 1995) ==
=== Third Division (1981–1985) ===
Docherty's short spell in charge ended when he was sacked in early December 1981 after leading his side to just three wins in 17 league games.

Docherty had brought in a clutch of players including Tommy Booth and Gary Buckley from Manchester City, Jonathan Clark from Derby County and John Kelly from Tranmere Rovers. A 4–1 FA Cup defeat at Chesterfield saw 'The Doc' replaced by Alan Kelly (on a caretaker basis), before former Everton boss Gordon Lee joined in December 1981.

Lee improved the team's results, avoiding a catastrophic drop to the basement division by a considerable margin. Amongst the players the manager brought in was loan goalkeeper Martin Hodge.

The next season, 1982–83, started with a Steve Elliott hat-trick defeating Millwall 3–2. However, North End's form soon collapsed, leaving them in danger of relegation, until a run of 9 wins from their last 13 games catapulted them into 16th position.

Following this Alan Kelly again took charge, but the sale of star striker Elliott left the side short of goals, whilst conceding numerous goals. 1984–85 saw North End relegated, shipping exactly 100 goals. The side's top league goalscorer was John Kelly with a paltry seven.

=== Fourth Division and re-election (1985–86) ===
North End's first ever season in Division Four saw further reverses for the club. Tommy Booth had taken over from Kelly during the latter stages of the previous season, bringing former Manchester United player Brian Kidd in as his assistant. Despite an impressive 4–0 win over Torquay United in September, things gradually degenerated, culminating in a 7–3 cup defeat at the hands of Walsall.

Booth soon resigned and Kidd took the reins, but things failed to improve. His record was one win in 17 matches when he too resigned, leaving midfielder Jonathan Clark in charge. He won five games on the trot in March 1986, but by then it was too late. North End had hit the depths, finishing 23rd and being forced to apply for re-election.

After a successful re-election hearing it was all change at Deepdale the following year, with a new synthetic surface being laid in an attempt to bring extra revenue into the club.

=== John McGrath, manager (1986–1990) ===
The plan seemed to work, as North End, under new manager John McGrath, stormed to promotion in 1986–87 after finishing second in Division Four behind Northampton Town. The team's home form was superb as the opposition appeared to find it difficult to adapt to the new pitch, and McGrath's new recruits, journeymen such as Sam Allardyce, Oshor Williams, Gary Swann, Ronnie Hildersley and Les Chapman made them an extremely hard team to beat.

In addition, the club reached the fourth round of the FA Cup, defeating Bury, Chorley and Middlesbrough before succumbing to Newcastle United.

Promotion was achieved with four matches to spare, Chapman's winning goal at Orient securing a return to Division Three. John Thomas finished as top scorer with 21 league goals, aided superbly by Gary Brazil.

The next season, 1987–88, was one of consolidation, McGrath bringing in new boys Tony Ellis and Brian Mooney.

1988–89 almost saw a return to Division Two, as North End finished 6th, only to lose 4–2 to Port Vale in the two-legged play-off semi-final. Unfortunately, the manager who had resuscitated the club began to struggle and a 2–0 FA Cup reverse at non-league side Whitley Bay proved to be the final straw in February 1990.

=== Les Chapman, manager (1990–1992) ===
His successor Les Chapman was appointed on 17 February 1990 and the team managed to avoid relegation, finishing nineteenth. Chapman was not helped by the perennial problems of a lack of funds and the sale of more first-team players including Ellis, Mooney and Ian Bogie. As a result, he struggled to move the team forward and Preston's mediocre league form continued through the next two seasons, eventually leading to his dismissal on 29 September 1992. The team finished seventeenth in both 1990–91 and 1991–92.

=== John Beck and Gary Peters (1992–1995) ===
The board chose to appoint John Beck as manager on 7 December 1992 and he brought in Gary Peters as his assistant. Beck made wholesale changes which included laying generous amounts of sand onto the flanks of the plastic pitch. The team at one stage looked to be safe from relegation but a disastrous run of five successive defeats took the club back into the fourth tier, now called League Three. Beck's long-ball tactics were controversial. Even so, the team finished fifth in 1993–94 and reached the League Three play-off final at Wembley, but they lost 4–2 to Martin O'Neill's Wycombe Wanderers.

In the summer of 1994, the plastic pitch was removed by order of the Football League and the club was taken over by BAXI, producers of heating systems, who have a large manufacturing and testing facility in Preston. BAXI's chief executive Bryan Gray became club chairman. One of the first announcements by the new board was that Deepdale, until then a dilapidated stadium owned by Preston Council, would be upgraded into a modern stadium. This was made possible by the injection of extra funds by BAXI and from a subsequent new share issue. Work began the following year with the demolition of the old West Stand which stood on the Deepdale Road side of the ground. It was replaced by the Sir Tom Finney Stand at a cost of over £4 million.

In Preston's first game back on grass, they defeated Lincoln City 4–0. Despite early promise, a run of seven successive league losses saw the fans turn against the manager and, on 1 December 1994, Beck stepped down to make way for Peters, who implemented a passing game and turned things around so that the team again finished in fifth place. Peters was aided by the young David Beckham, who joined the club from Manchester United on a month-long loan spell and scored two goals in his five appearances. In the 1995 play-offs, Preston lost 2–0 on aggregate to Bury in the semi-final.

=== Out of the fourth tier (1995–1997) ===
Andy Saville, a much-travelled striker, was signed from Birmingham City for £100,000, whilst Steve Wilkinson was acquired for £80,000 from Mansfield Town to partner him. Despite losing their first game of the 1995–96 season 2–1 at home to Lincoln City, North End then embarked on a 21-match unbeaten run, which included a 6–0 drubbing of Mansfield, in which Saville and Wilkinson each bagged a hat-trick.

In all, Saville finished the 1995–96 season with 29 league goals with Wilkinson and midfielder Simon Davey notching ten apiece. The Third Division championship was secured in late April with a 2–0 win at Hartlepool. The brand new 8,000 seater Tom Finney Stand was opened for the visit of Darlington on 16 March 1996.

Gary Peters kept faith with the majority of his promotion winning outfit, reinforcing his squad at various stages of the following season with players who would be crucial to the club's success in subsequent campaigns. Mark Rankine joined from Wolves, Sean Gregan from Darlington for £350,000 and Michael Jackson from Bury. Slowly the team that had got North End promoted were moved on, as the club looked to build for the future.

=== David Moyes, manager (1998–2002) ===
In 1997–98, a very inconsistent period of form saw the club move Peters to a new position as Director as the Centre of Excellence and replace him with assistant manager David Moyes, who was formally appointed on 12 January 1998. Moyes, who had been an excellent servant at centre-half for the previous few seasons, immediately injected a new zest into his side and the club eventually finished in 15th position, nine points above the relegation zone.

Meanwhile, work on Deepdale was continuing and the Bill Shankly Kop was opened in 1998 at the Blackpool Road (north) end of the ground. The next stage was demolition of the old Town End terrace, behind the goal at the south end, to be replaced by the Alan Kelly Town End stand, which opened in 2001.

In 1998–99, Preston came close to promotion but injuries to key players towards the end of the campaign saw them defeated in the play-offs by a determined Gillingham side. 1998–99 also saw the club lose out in an epic Deepdale FA Cup tie at home to Arsenal in the third round. Kurt Nogan scored two first-half goals, until the Gunners fought back (aided by a sending-off for David Eyres) to win 4–2.

In 2000, Preston North End finally made their return to the second tier of the Football League, after an absence of nineteen seasons. Jon Macken, whom Gary Peters had signed from Manchester United two years previously, had a storming season scoring 22 league goals, his flair being reinforced by the team's solid spine of Teuvo Moilanen in goal, defenders Graham Alexander, Colin Murdock, Michael Jackson and Rob Edwards and a central midfield made up of workhorses Gregan and Rankine. The championship was confirmed at Cambridge on 24 April, a game which brought North End's seventh, and last, defeat of the season.

In January 2001, Preston beat their club transfer record by paying £1.5 million to Manchester United for David Healy. The team finished the 2000–01 season in fourth place, but again failed in the play-offs with a 3–0 defeat by Bolton Wanderers in the final at the Millennium Stadium. Preston had earlier beaten Birmingham City in the semi-final by winning a penalty shoot-out at Deepdale after the tie ended in a 2–2 aggregate draw.

Bryan Gray resigned as chairman in the autumn of 2001 and BAXI declined to appoint a replacement, so it was clear that they intended to sell their holding in the club. Club director Derek Shaw, a local businessman, took over as acting chairman. Meanwhile, the collapse of ITV Digital cost the club an income of £4.6 million over the next two years, which meant that planning for the Invincibles Pavilion on the east side of Deepdale had to be postponed (the stand was finally opened in 2008).

David Moyes left the club on 14 March 2002 to become manager of Everton and was replaced by Craig Brown just before the 2001–02 season ended, Preston finishing in eighth place.

=== 2002 to 2008 ===
In June 2002, BAXI's involvement ceased when Derek Shaw and sponsor Steve Jackson combined to buy the firm's 26% shareholding and increase their stake to 28%. A few days earlier, future club owner Trevor Hemmings had increased his share to 12%. The other main shareholder was fund management group Ivory and Sime UK, which owned 25.88%.

Craig Brown was the team manager for the next two seasons, the team finishing twelfth in 2002–03 and fifteenth in 2003–04. The second tier Football League One was re-branded in summer 2004 as the Football League Championship. After a poor start to the 2004–05 Championship season, Brown left by mutual consent on 28 August 2004. His successor, appointed next day, was his first-team coach Billy Davies.

In two consecutive seasons under Davies, Preston reached the Championship play-offs. At Cardiff's Millennium Stadium in the 2005 final, they were beaten by 1–0 by West Ham United. In the following season, they were defeated in the semi-finals by Leeds United. The team had finished fourth in 2005–06 and this was the club's highest second-tier league position since Jimmy Milne's team finished third in 1964. On 2 June 2006, Davies left to take over at Derby County and was succeeded on 17 June by Paul Simpson.

Simpson had been the manager of Carlisle United and he quickly replaced the recently departed defenders Claude Davis and Tyrone Mears with Sean St. Ledger and Liam Chilvers. The 2006–07 season began well under Simpson and Preston rose to the top of the Championship in December, the highest league place the team had reached since relegation from the top flight in 1961. On 28 March, striker David Nugent made his full international debut for England and scored in the 90th minute of the match against Andorra. Nugent was the first Preston player since Tom Finney to represent England. In the league, the team lost form towards the end of the season and finished seventh to miss the play-offs.

On 11 July 2007, Nugent left Preston to join Portsmouth for a club record fee (i.e., received by Preston) of £6,000,000. Simpson, with a much increased transfer budget following this sale, brought in Billy Jones, Kevin Nicholls, Karl Hawley and Darren Carter. Despite these signings, Preston's poor form at the end of the previous season continued and they had won only three matches when Simpson was sacked on 13 November 2007. He was replaced on 20 November 2007 by Alan Irvine, who was David Moyes' assistant manager at Everton, on a 3½-year contract. Irvine was able to lift the team out of the relegation zone to finish fifteenth. It was during the latter half of this season that 'Gentry Day' began as an annual tradition.

== 2008 to present ==
=== Completion of Deepdale re-development ===
The re-development of Deepdale, begun in 1995, was completed ahead of the 2008–09 season with the opening of the Invincibles Pavilion, opposite the Sir Tom Finney Stand, to replace the 1930s-built "Pavilion" stand on the east side of the ground. In further commemoration of Tom Finney, the club's address was changed to Deepdale Stadium, Sir Tom Finney Way, Preston. This road is that part of the A6063, formerly called Deepdale Road, which runs past the west side of the ground. There is an adjacent residential road called Bill Shankly Crescent. As a result of the re-development, Deepdale became an all-seater stadium with a capacity of 23,404.

Hopes that the finished stadium might soon feature Premier League football were dashed when the team, who had finished sixth in the 2008–09 Championship, were beaten 1–2 on aggregate by Sheffield United in the two-leg play-off semi-final. On 29 December 2009, manager Alan Irvine was surprisingly dismissed after a run of ten matches with only one win. The team continued to struggle and in 2011 were relegated to the third-tier Football League One, where they remained for the next four years.

=== Trevor Hemmings takeover ===
Preston North End as a business faced another crisis at this time with a winding up petition being served by HM Revenue and Customs on 14 May 2010 and all shares in the company being suspended. A deal was arranged whereby the club was taken over by Trevor Hemmings, a successful Lancashire businessman, whose company Deepdale PNE Holdings Limited secured a 51% shareholding. Currently (i.e., as formally declared under EFL regulations on 3 May 2017), Preston North End is a limited company owned 100 per cent by Deepdale PNE Holdings Limited, a wholly owned subsidiary of Wordon Group Limited which is incorporated in the Isle of Man and controlled by the family interests of Trevor Hemmings.

Hemmings hired Maurice Lindsay, prominent in rugby league as a past chairman of Wigan R.L.F.C., to take over as club chairman in place of Derek Shaw, who stepped aside to become club vice-president. Through the 2010–11 season, which ended in relegation, a cost-cutting policy was implemented to put the business back onto a sound economic footing and eight of the team's higher-paid players were transferred out. In December 2011, Lindsay had to retire due to ill health and was replaced days later by Peter Ridsdale. Ridsdale stepped aside in October 2012 following an insolvency action but has continued to act as an advisor to Hemmings. Preston now have a chief executive instead of a chairman and this has been John Kay from 1 November 2014.

=== Simon Grayson, manager (2013–2017) ===
Simon Grayson was appointed as manager on 18 February 2013. He was the club's fifth manager in four seasons, after Irvine, Darren Ferguson, Phil Brown and Graham Westley. Under Grayson, Preston qualified for both the 2014 and 2015 League One play-offs. The team lost the semi-final in 2014 and then gained promotion back to the second-tier Championship by defeating Swindon Town 4–0 in the 2015 final at Wembley.

Earlier in the 2014–15 season, Preston enjoyed a good run in the FA Cup and reached the fifth round (last sixteen) for the first time since 2008. They were drawn at home against Manchester United in a tie that attracted 21,348 and was given national live TV coverage. It was United's first visit to Deepdale since 1972. A 47th-minute goal by Scott Laird gave Preston a surprise lead but United rallied to win 1–3.

Championship consolidation was achieved in 2015–16 as the team won fifteen matches to finish eleventh. The Football League was renamed the English Football League (EFL) in summer 2016 and so the second tier became the EFL Championship. Preston finished eleventh again in 2016–17. Grayson left the club in June 2017 to manage Sunderland.

=== Alex Neil, manager (2017–2021) ===
Grayson's replacement was Alex Neil, appointed on 4 July 2017. In his first season, Preston finished seventh in the 2017–18 EFL Championship, just outside the play-off positions and the club's highest finish since the team was sixth in 2009.

=== Frankie McAvoy, manager (2021) ===
Following the dismissal of Neil on 21 March 2021, Frankie McAvoy was named as interim head coach of Preston until the end of the 2020–21 season. On 10 May 2021, McAvoy appointed head coach permanently, after winning five of his eight matches in interim charges. On 6 December 2021, McAvoy was dismissed by Preston despite a respectable record, winning fourteen league games out of his 33 in charge.

=== Ryan Lowe, manager (2021–2024) ===
Ryan Lowe was appointed manager in December 2021. He took Preston to a 13th-place finish in his first season, with the club finishing 12th and 10th in the following two seasons. On 12 August 2024, after just one game of Preston's 2024–2025 season (a 2–0 home defeat by Sheffield United), Lowe left the club by mutual consent.

== See also ==
- Scotch Professors

== Sources ==
- Agnew, Paul (2002). Tom Finney – Football Legend. Milo Books. ISBN 0-9530847-9-5.
- Finney, Tom (2003). Tom Finney – My Autobiography. Headline Publishing. ISBN 0-7553-1106-X.
