= Willacy =

Willacy is a surname. Notable people with the surname include:

- David Willacy (1916–1941), English footballer
- John G. Willacy (1859–1943), American politician
- Mark Willacy, Australian journalist
- Sarah Willacy (born 1995), Australian soccer player

== See also ==
- Willacy County, Texas
