= Mountain tea =

Mountain tea may refer to:

- Sideritis, also known as mountain tea, a genus of flowering plants
- Gaultheria procumbens, a plant species also known as American mountain tea
- Mountain Tea State Forest - see List of Indiana state forests
- Mountain Tea, and other poems, a 1984 collection of poetry by Peter van Toorn

== See also ==
- Leptospermum grandifolium, commonly known as the mountain tea-tree, a species of shrub or small tree
- High-mountain tea, several varieties of Oolong tea grown in Taiwan
