= Celebrity Mastermind =

British television quiz show

- Genre: Quiz show
- Created by: Bill Wright
- Presented by: Magnus Magnusson (2002); John Humphrys (2003–2021); Clive Myrie (2022–2027)
- Country of origin: United Kingdom
- Original language: English
- No. of series: 24
- No. of episodes: 223 (plus three Children in Need specials) (list of episodes)

Production
- Production location: Dock10 studios (2011–2021)
- Running time: 30 minutes
- Production companies: BBC (2002–2015); BBC Studios (2015–2019); Hat Trick Productions and Hindsight Productions (2019–2027)

Original release
- Network: BBC Two (2002–2004, 2024–present); BBC One (2004–2024)
- Release: 30 December 2002 – present

Related
- Mastermind

Celebrity Mastermind is a celebrity version of Mastermind, a British television quiz show broadcast by BBC television. Celebrity Mastermind began in 2002 as a one-off special hosted by Magnus Magnusson, the original host of the main show, before expanding to the current arrangement of 10 episodes, broadcast during December and January. This broadcast was originally hosted by John Humphrys, who also hosted the main show from 2003 to 2021. The most recent host is Clive Myrie, who first presented an episode in 2022. On 29 July 2026, the BBC announced that it had axed the show as part of cost-cutting measures, and will end after series 25.

== Format ==
The format is the same as the standard show, although each episode is treated as a single contest with the winner receiving a trophy, and the contestant's fees being donated to charity.

== History ==
The original BBC version of Mastermind, hosted by Magnus Magnusson, was broadcast on BBC One from 1972 to 1997. While other versions continued on radio and satellite television, the show did not return to BBC Television until 2002, with a one-off episode, the Mastermind Celebrity Special, originally broadcast on 30 December 2002 on BBC Two to celebrate the 30th anniversary of the first ever Mastermind final. The original host, Magnus Magnusson, was brought back for this special.

This was a precursor to the main show also returning to the BBC with a new host, John Humphrys. The first series of the main show hosted by Humphrys began on BBC Two on 7 July 2003. The celebrity version then also aired on BBC Two for a first full series of three episodes in December 2003/January 2004, also hosted by Humphrys.

The celebrity version of the show has continued every year since, alongside the main show. Although the main show has remained on BBC Two, the celebrity version was promoted to BBC One from series 2 onward, before reverting back to BBC Two in 2024.

== Transmissions ==
Series	Episodes	Originally released		
Series	Episodes	First released	Last released	Network
Special		30 December 2002		BBC Two
1	3	26 December 2003	2 January 2004	BBC Two
2	3	23 July 2004	6 August 2004	BBC One
3	2	26 December 2004	31 December 2004	BBC One
4	5	28 December 2005	2 January 2006	BBC One
5	5	26 December 2006	30 December 2006	BBC One
6	5	31 December 2007	4 January 2008	BBC One
7	5	28 December 2008	1 January 2009	BBC One
8	10	27 December 2009	7 January 2010	BBC One
9	10	27 December 2010	7 January 2011	BBC One
10	10	27 December 2011	8 January 2012	BBC One
11	10	27 December 2012	5 January 2013	BBC One
12	10	23 December 2013	17 January 2014	BBC One
13	10	21 December 2014	18 January 2015	BBC One
14	10	22 December 2015	9 January 2016	BBC One
15	10	19 December 2016	14 January 2017	BBC One
16	10	27 December 2017	13 January 2018	BBC One
17	10	21 December 2018	18 January 2019	BBC One
18	10	27 December 2019	4 April 2020	BBC One
19	14	19 December 2020	8 May 2021	BBC One
20	14	5 February 2022	7 May 2022	BBC One
21	14	5 November 2022	29 April 2023	BBC One
22	14	24 November 2023	22 March 2024	BBC One
23	14	23 December 2024	27 January 2025	BBC Two
24	14	22 December 2025	26 January 2026	BBC Two
25	TBA	2027	2027	BBC Two

== Trophy ==
The trophy presented to each winner was originally a commemorative glass bowl. The current trophy (2015–2016 series) is a wedge-shaped piece of glass.
