= Grace Victory =

British YouTuber, writer, activist, and television presenter

Grace Francesca Victory (born 29 August 1990) is a British YouTuber, writer, body positive activist and television presenter from High Wycombe, Buckinghamshire.

== Early life ==
Grace grew up on a council estate in High Wycombe, Buckinghamshire, with her mother Dawn, younger sister Charlotte (known as Charleigh) and her father. Victory is of British-Caribbean heritage.

Through childhood Victory witnessed domestic violence and drug abuse at home, and is currently no longer in contact with her father.

As a child Victory trained at the Jackie Palmer Stage School in High Wycombe, and went on to star in The Bill, Family Affairs and four Harry Potter films.

== Career ==
Victory began her YouTube channel age 21 in 2011. Her channel started out as The Ugly Face of Beauty, with most of her content focussing on make-up and fashion. As her content matured Victory diversified into more personal video and blog content including mental health, eating disorders and domestic violence. As of January 2021 Grace has over 220,000 YouTube subscribers, more than 220,000 Instagram followers and over 90,000 Twitter followers.

In 2016 Victory presented BBC Three's Clean Eating's Dirty Secrets, a documentary about the wellness approach of clean eating.

In March 2017 Victory collaborated with Nike, modelling for their first plus-size apparel campaign. Later in 2017 Grace released her first book No Filter, featuring stories from her life including topics of domestic abuse and mental health.

Since 2019 Victory has been a columnist for Happiful magazine.

Victory's second book How To Calm It was published in January 2021 by #Merky Books, Stormzy's imprint within Penguin Random House.

== Personal life ==
Grace began therapy in 2016 for mental health issues.

Victory announced her pregnancy with partner Lee, in a photograph posted to her social media on 29 August 2020.

In early December 2020 Victory developed mild symptoms of COVID-19, but on 24 December 2020 her son was born prematurely due to COVID-19 complications and the following day she was placed in an induced coma. On 8 March 2021 Grace made a post on Twitter stating "I'm awake" followed by another saying "Baby boy is thriving at home x."
