= Carex alsophila =

Scientific classification
- Kingdom: Plantae
- Clade: Tracheophytes
- Clade: Angiosperms
- Clade: Monocots
- Clade: Commelinids
- Order: Poales
- Family: Cyperaceae
- Genus: Carex
- Species: C. alsophila

Binomial name
- Carex alsophila F.Muell.

Species of plant

Carex alsophila, commonly known as forest sedge, is a tussock-forming species of perennial sedge in the family Cyperaceae. It is native to Victoria in south eastern Australia.

The sedge has a short rhizome and tufted shoots that are densely packed together. The erect culms have a triangular cross section and can be smooth or have a rough texture. The culms are 30 to 100 cm (12 to 39 in) in length and have a diameter of 1.5 to 2.5 mm (0.059 to 0.098 in).

The species was formally described by the botanist Ferdinand von Mueller in 1874 as a part of the work Fragmenta phytographiae Australiae.

It is only found in southern Victoria in the Gippsland, Highlands and Victorian Alps regions.

== See also ==
- List of Carex species
