= Alsophila × marcescens =

Scientific classification
- Kingdom: Plantae
- Clade: Tracheophytes
- Division: Polypodiophyta
- Class: Polypodiopsida
- Order: Cyatheales
- Family: Cyatheaceae
- Genus: Alsophila
- Species: A. × marcescens

Binomial name
- Alsophila × marcescens (N.A.Wakef.) R.M.Tryon

Synonyms
- Cyathea × marcescens N.A.Wakef.

Species of fern

Alsophila × marcescens, synonym Cyathea × marcescens, commonly known as the skirted tree fern, is a tree fern endemic to the Cape Otway ranges in Victoria and Tasmania, Australia. It is a natural hybrid, apparently Alsophila australis (syn. Cyathea australis) × Alsophila cunninghamii (syn. Cyathea cunninghamii). Large and Braggins (2004) note that it has characteristics midway between these two species. The spores of A. × marcescens are usually malformed although sterile. The trunk of this plant is erect and up to 10 m tall. Fronds may be bi- or tripinnate and 3–4 m in length. Dead fronds often persist, forming a characteristic skirt around the trunk. The stipe is thick, black and warty. The rachis and trunk are covered in shiny, dark brown scales. Sori are borne near the fertile pinnule midvein and are protected by thin indusia that are saucer-like in appearance.

The type material was collected by N. A. Wakefield on Mount Drummer (specifically in Karlo Creek and "The Spring") in February, 1941 and Bungywarr Creek, Combienbar in August, 1941.

Alsophila × marcescens is a slow-growing plant that is sensitive to dry conditions and requires shelter from the sun and the wind.
