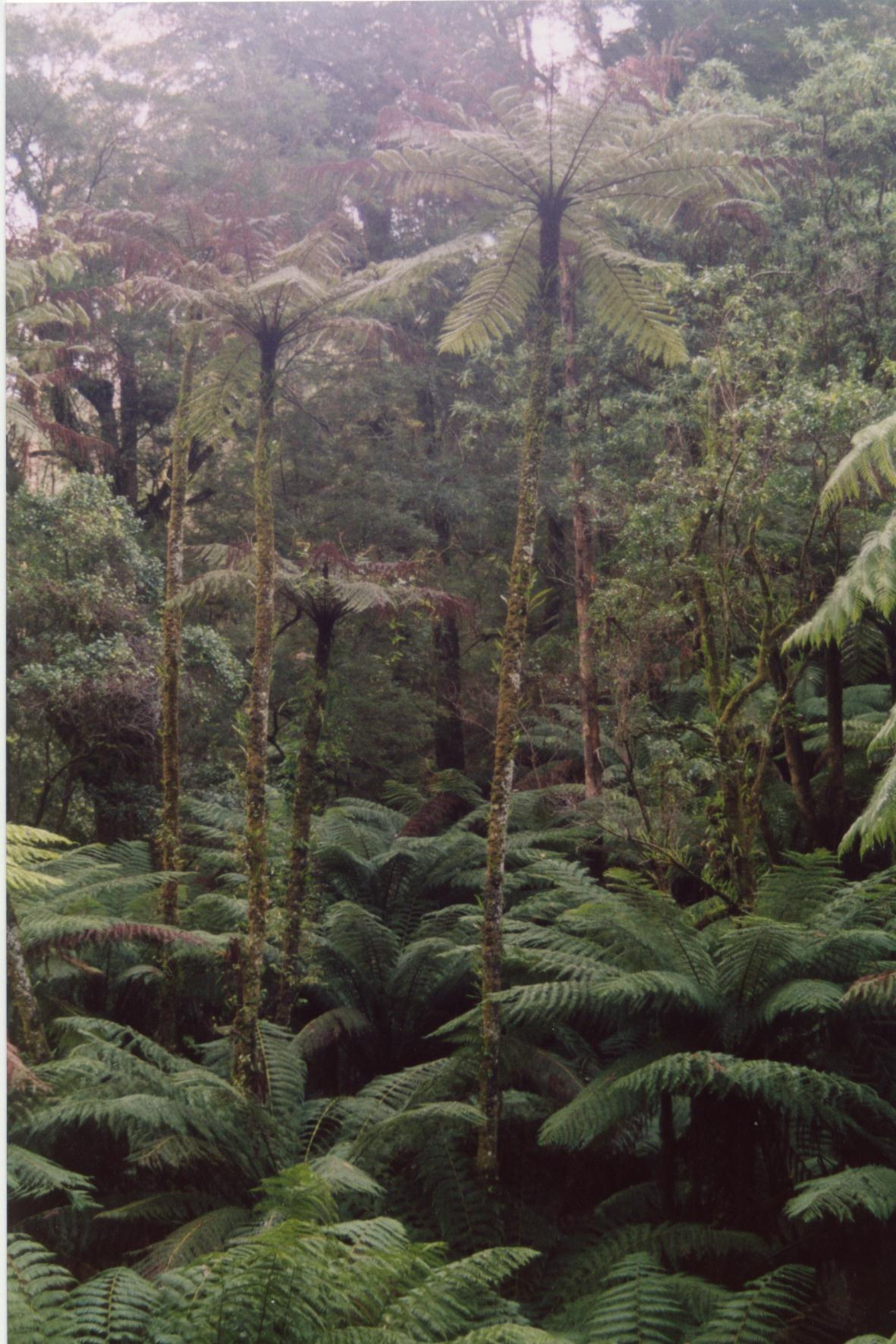

Conservation status
- Rare (NCA)

Scientific classification
- Kingdom: Plantae
- Clade: Embryophytes
- Clade: Tracheophytes
- Division: Polypodiophyta
- Class: Polypodiopsida
- Order: Cyatheales
- Family: Cyatheaceae
- Genus: Alsophila
- Species: A. cunninghamii

Binomial name
- Alsophila cunninghamii (Hook.f.) R.M.Tryon

Synonyms
- Cyathea boylei F.Muell.; Cyathea cunninghamii Hook.f.

= Alsophila cunninghamii =

Species of fern

Alsophila cunninghamii, synonym Cyathea cunninghamii, also known as the gully tree fern and slender tree fern, is a species of tree fern indigenous to New Zealand including North Island (type locality), South Island and Chatham Islands; also to Victoria, possibly New South Wales, southeastern Queensland, and Tasmania in Australia. It grows in damp forest, often emerging from stream gullies and riverbanks.

== Description ==
A. cunninghamii is an uncommon, slow-growing tree fern reaching up to 20 m in height and with a trunk diameter of 6–15 cm, occasionally as much as 20 cm. Fronds are tri- to tetrapinnate and 3 m or more in length. The rachis and stipe are slender, black brown, warty and covered with brown scales. Sori occur along each side of the pinnule midvein and are covered by hood-like indusia.

== Taxonomy ==
The specific epithet cunninghamii commemorates Allan Cunningham (1791–1839), a botanist who traveled widely in Australia and New Zealand.

Plants from New Caledonia known as Alsophila stelligera may represent the same species.

In the wild, A. cunninghamii hybridises with Alsophila australis to form the fertile hybrid Alsophila × marcescens.

== Cultivation and uses ==
In cultivation, A. cunninghamii requires a high-moisture environment and performs best in a growing medium of rich humus. Plants should be protected from the wind. Brownseynoted that it has a lower tolerance for drought than other related species.
