= Jimmy Milne (footballer, born 1911) =

Scottish footballer and manager

Personal information
- Full name: James Low Milne
- Date of birth: 24 January 1911
- Place of birth: Dundee, Scotland
- Date of death: 13 December 1997 (aged 86)
- Height: 5 ft 10 1/2 in (1.79 m)

Senior career*
Years	Team	Apps	(Gls)
1932–1939	Preston North End	230	(9)

Managerial career
- 1946–1947: Wigan Athletic
- 1947–1948: Morecambe
- 1961–1968: Preston North End
- * Club domestic league appearances and goals

James Low Milne (24 January 1911 – 13 December 1997) was a Scottish football player and manager.

== Playing career ==
Born in Dundee, Milne played local non-league football before joining Dundee United in 1931. The following year he moved to England when he joined Preston North End.

== Management career ==
He managed Preston North End from 1961 to 1968 and Wigan Athletic from 1946 to 1947 as well as Morecambe from 1947 to 1948.

== Personal life ==
Jimmy is the father of Gordon Milne, who also went on to be a professional footballer and manager.

== Honours ==
Preston North End

- FA Cup runner-up: 1936–37
