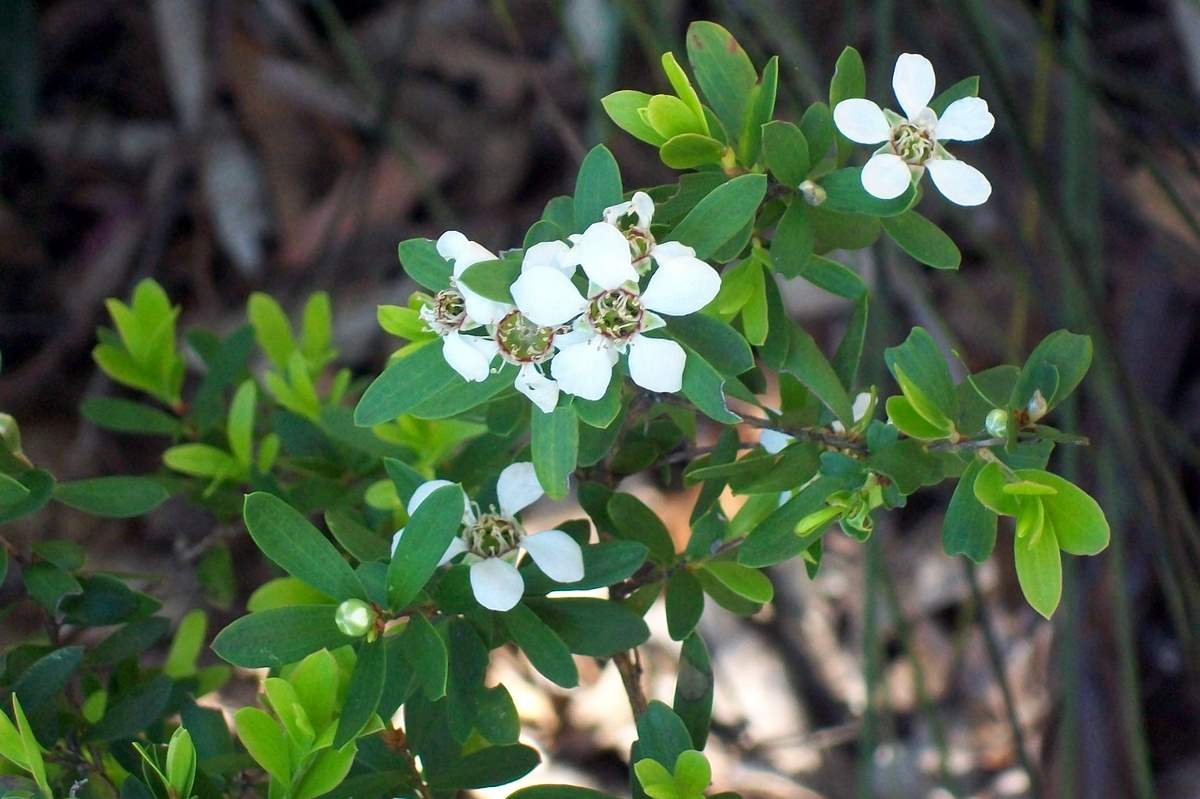
- Leptospermum grandifolium in Ku-ring-gai Chase National Park

Scientific classification
- Kingdom: Plantae
- Clade: Tracheophytes
- Clade: Angiosperms
- Clade: Eudicots
- Clade: Rosids
- Order: Myrtales
- Family: Myrtaceae
- Genus: Leptospermum
- Species: L. grandifolium

Binomial name
- Leptospermum grandifolium Sm.
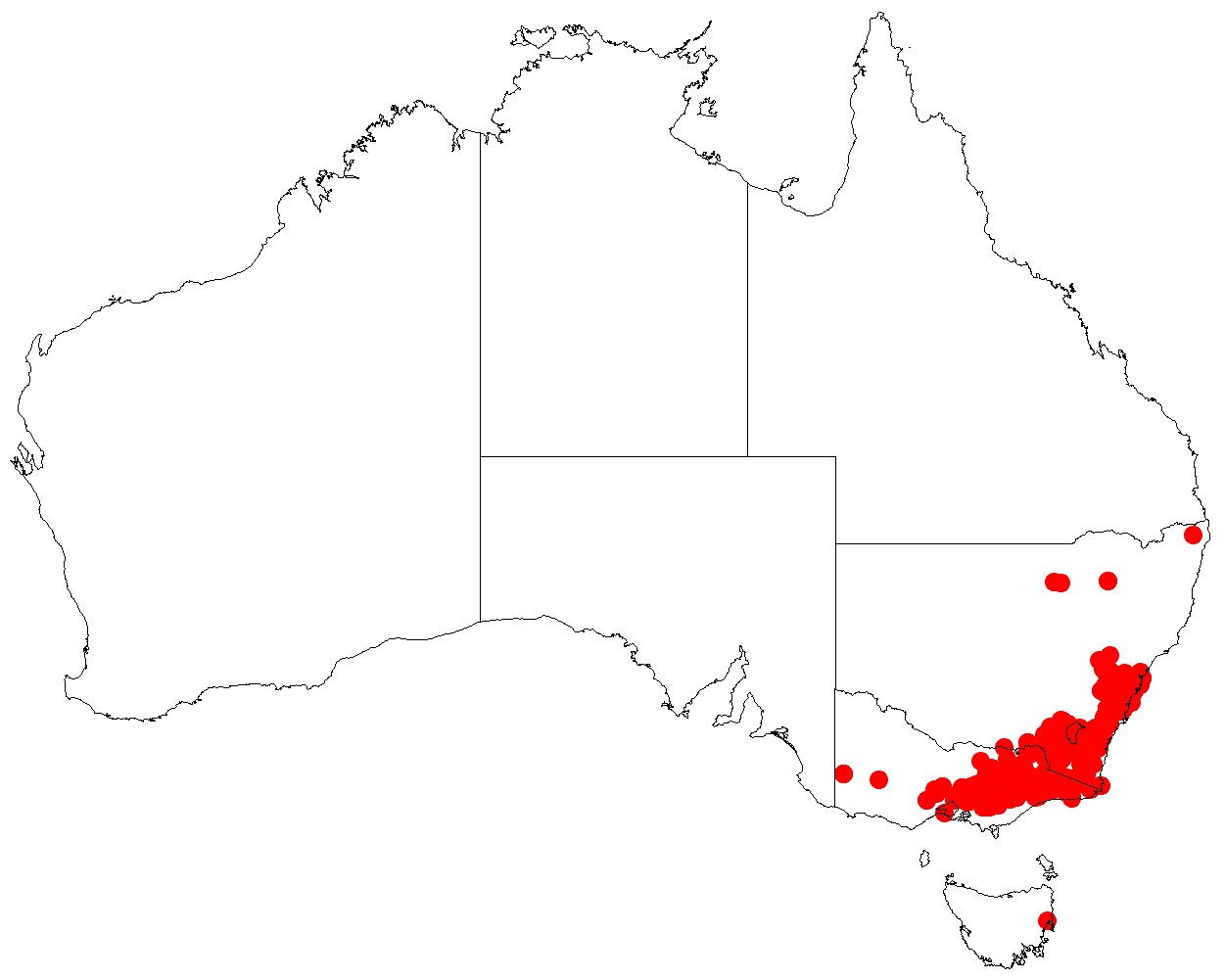
- Occurrence data from AVH

Synonyms
- Leptospermum lanigerum var. grandifolium (Sm.) Hook.f.; Leptospermum grandifolium Sm. var. grandifolium; Leptospermum lanigerum var. grandifolia Hook.f. orth. var.; Leptospermum lanigerum var. grandifolium (Sm.) Hook.f.; Leptospermum pubescens var. grandifolium (Sm.) Domin; Leptospermum subargenteum Gand.

= Leptospermum grandifolium =

Mountain tea-tree

Species of shrub

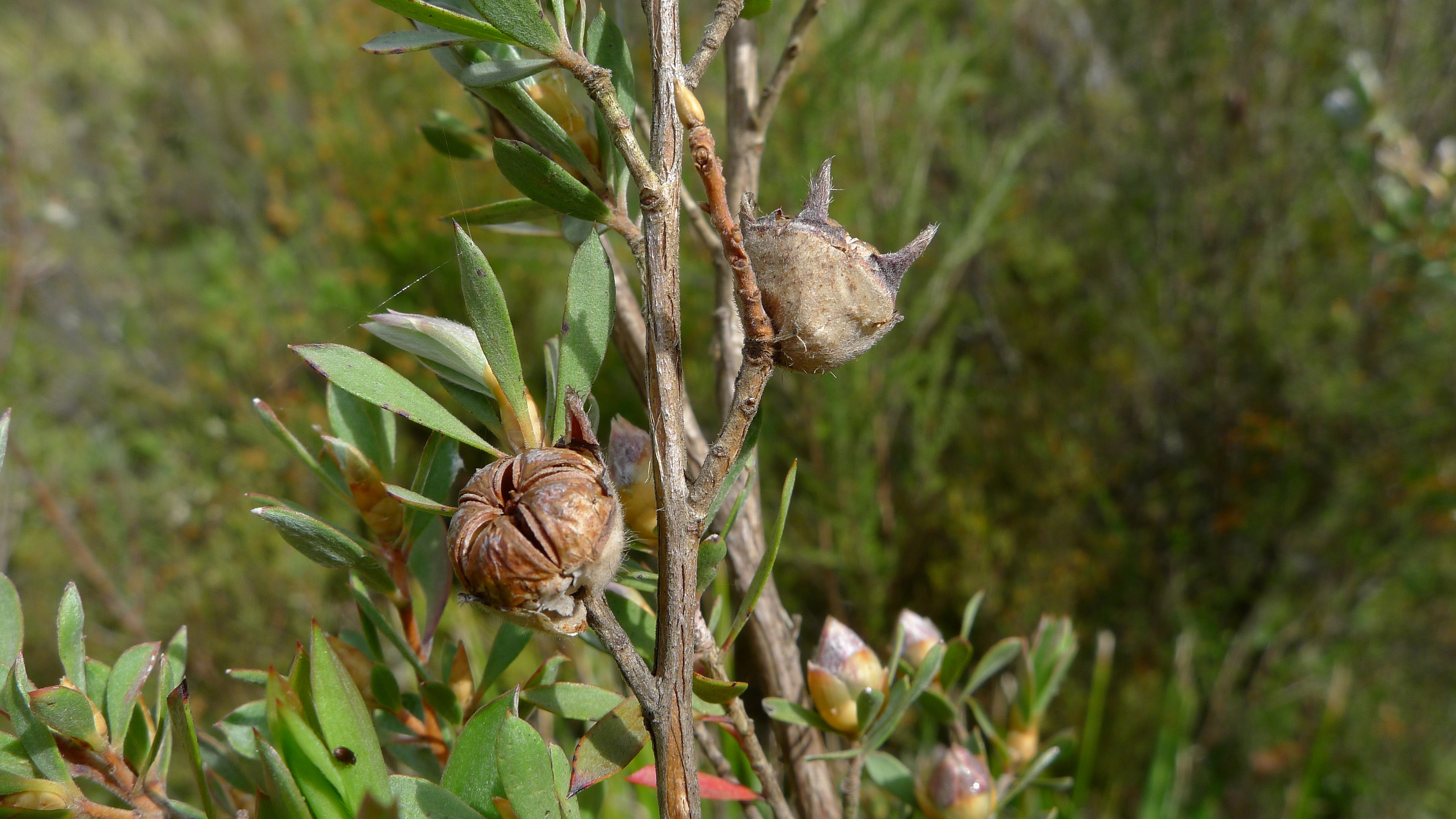
Fruit

The Leptospermum grandifolium, commonly known as mountain tea-tree or woolly teatree, is a species of shrub or small tree that is endemic to south-eastern Australia. It has elliptical to egg-shaped leaves with a sharp point on the tip, white flowers and relatively large, broadly hemispherical fruit.

== Description ==
Leptospermum grandifolium is a shrub that grows to a height of about 1.5 m (4 ft 11 in) or a tree up to 10 m (33 ft) tall with smooth bark that is shed in papery strips or flakes. It has narrow egg-shaped to elliptical leaves 10–35 mm (0.39–1.38 in) long and 3–7 mm (0.12–0.28 in) wide, often with a felty surface, with a small, sharp pointed tip and a base tapering to a short petiole. The flowers are arranged singly on short side shoots on the ends of leafy branchlets and are 12–18 mm (0.47–0.71 in) or more in diameter. There are broad, pale brownish bracts and bracteoles at the base of the flower bud. The floral cup is 3–5 mm (0.12–0.20 in) long and densely hairy. The sepals are egg-shaped to triangular, 3–4 mm (0.12–0.16 in) long and densely hairy, the petals white, 4–7 mm (0.16–0.28 in) long and the stamens about 3.5 mm (0.14 in) long. Flowering occurs from October to January and the fruit is a hemispherical capsule 8–10 mm (0.31–0.39 in) wide that remains on the plant when mature with the sepals attached.

== Taxonomy and naming ==
Leptospermum grandifolium was first formally described in 1802 by James Edward Smith in Transactions of the Linnean Society of London.

== Distribution and habitat ==
Mountain tea-tree is found in the eastern half of Victoria, in the Australian Capital Territory and in south eastern New South Wales as far north as the Hawkesbury River. It grows in swamps, along rocky streams and on sheltered slopes from the coast to subalpine parts of Mount Kosciuszko.

== Cultivation ==
Leptospermum grandifolium is one of several Leptospermum species which are valued in cultivation. The cultivar 'Silver Sheen' is hardy in mild and coastal areas of the UK, down to −5 °C (23 °F), but requires a sheltered position. It is a recipient of the Royal Horticultural Society's Award of Garden Merit.
