= David Willacy =

English footballer

Personal information
- Full name: David Lewis Willacy
- Date of birth: 13 June 1916
- Place of birth: Barrow, England
- Date of death: 1 September 1941 (aged 25)
- Place of death: England
- Position: Winger

Youth career
- 1933: Greenbrae Juveniles

Senior career*
Years	Team	Apps	(Gls)
1934–1937	Queen of the South	9	(0)
1938–1939	Preston North End	1	(0)
- * Club domestic league appearances and goals

David Lewis Willacy (13 June 1916 – 1 September 1941) was an English professional footballer who played as a winger in the Scottish Football League for Queen of the South and the Football League for Preston North End.

== Personal life ==
Willacy was married and served as a sergeant in the Royal Air Force Volunteer Reserve during the Second World War. He was killed in a training accident flying Hawker Hurricane V7467 on 1 September 1941. Willacy was buried at Annan Cemetery.

== Career statistics ==
Appearances and goals by club, season and competition
Club	Season	Division	League		National Cup		Total	
Club	Season	Division	Apps	Goals	Apps	Goals	Apps	Goals
Queen of the South	1934–35	Scottish League Division One	1	0	0	0	1	0
Queen of the South	1936–37	Scottish League Division One	8	0	0	0	8	0
Preston North End	1938–39	First Division	1	0	0	0	1	0
Career total			1	0	0	0	1	0
